= List of Australia tropical cyclones =

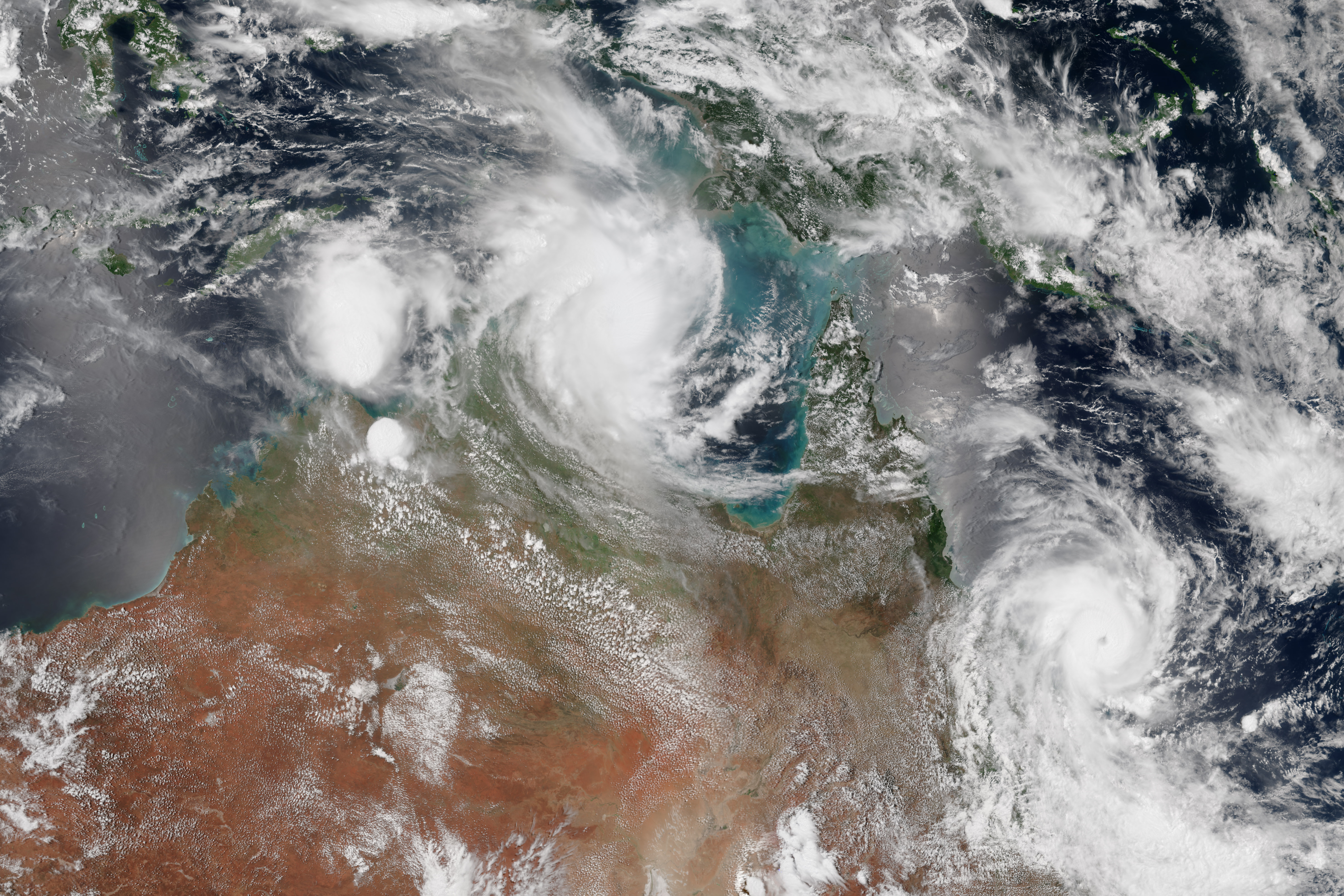
Satellite image of cyclones Lam (top-center) and Marcia (right) making near-simultaneous landfalls on Australia in February 2015

The country of Australia regularly experiences the damaging and deadly effects of tropical cyclones each year, primarily in the states of Queensland, Western Australia, and the Northern Territory. Each year on average, four tropical cyclones strike the country, and can occur as early as November or as late as May. Australia's Bureau of Meteorology (BoM) classifies warnings on a scale from one to five, with five as the strongest. The most recent Category 5 cyclone to make landfall in the country was Cyclone Ilsa in April 2023. The most recent cyclone to make landfall was a Category 5 cyclone called Cyclone Narelle which hit Queensland, the Northern Territory and Western Australia in March 2026.

== Background, climatology, and records ==
Australian tropical cyclone intensity scale
Category	Sustained winds	Gusts
Five	>107 kn (198 km/h; 123 mph)	>151 kn (280 km/h; 174 mph)
Four	86–107 kn (159–198 km/h; 99–123 mph)	122–151 kn (226–280 km/h; 140–174 mph)
Three	64–85 kn (119–157 km/h; 74–98 mph)	90–121 kn (167–224 km/h; 104–139 mph)
Two	48–63 kn (89–117 km/h; 55–72 mph)	68–89 kn (126–165 km/h; 78–102 mph)
One	34–47 kn (63–87 km/h; 39–54 mph)	49–67 kn (91–124 km/h; 56–77 mph)

Each year on average, four tropical cyclones make landfall in Australia. The country's cyclone season lasts from November to April. On 21 November 1973, Cyclone Ines became the earliest seasonal landfall in the country in the satellite era. One of the latest storms in a season to affect the country was Cyclone Herbie, which hit Shark Bay, Western Australia, on 21 May, 1988.

Australia's Bureau of Meteorology issues warnings on tropical cyclones, naming them when the cyclone attains gale-force winds. The agency also classifies storms using the Australian tropical cyclone intensity scale, with the strongest being a Category 5 on the scale.

Cyclone Mahina struck Bathurst Bay along Cape York Peninsula as a Category 5 cyclone. The cyclone wrecked four schooners, killing 307 people and becoming the deadliest on record in Australia. While moving ashore, the cyclone produced a storm surge of 12 m (39 ft).

On 10 April 1996, Cyclone Olivia moved over Barrow Island of Western Australia and produced the strongest non-tornadic winds ever recorded on Earth, with peak gusts of 408 kilometres per hour (254 mph). The BoM was initially unsure of the veracity of the reading, although a team at the 1999 Offshore Technology Conference presented the reading as the highest wind gust on Earth.

== States ==
=== Northern Territory ===
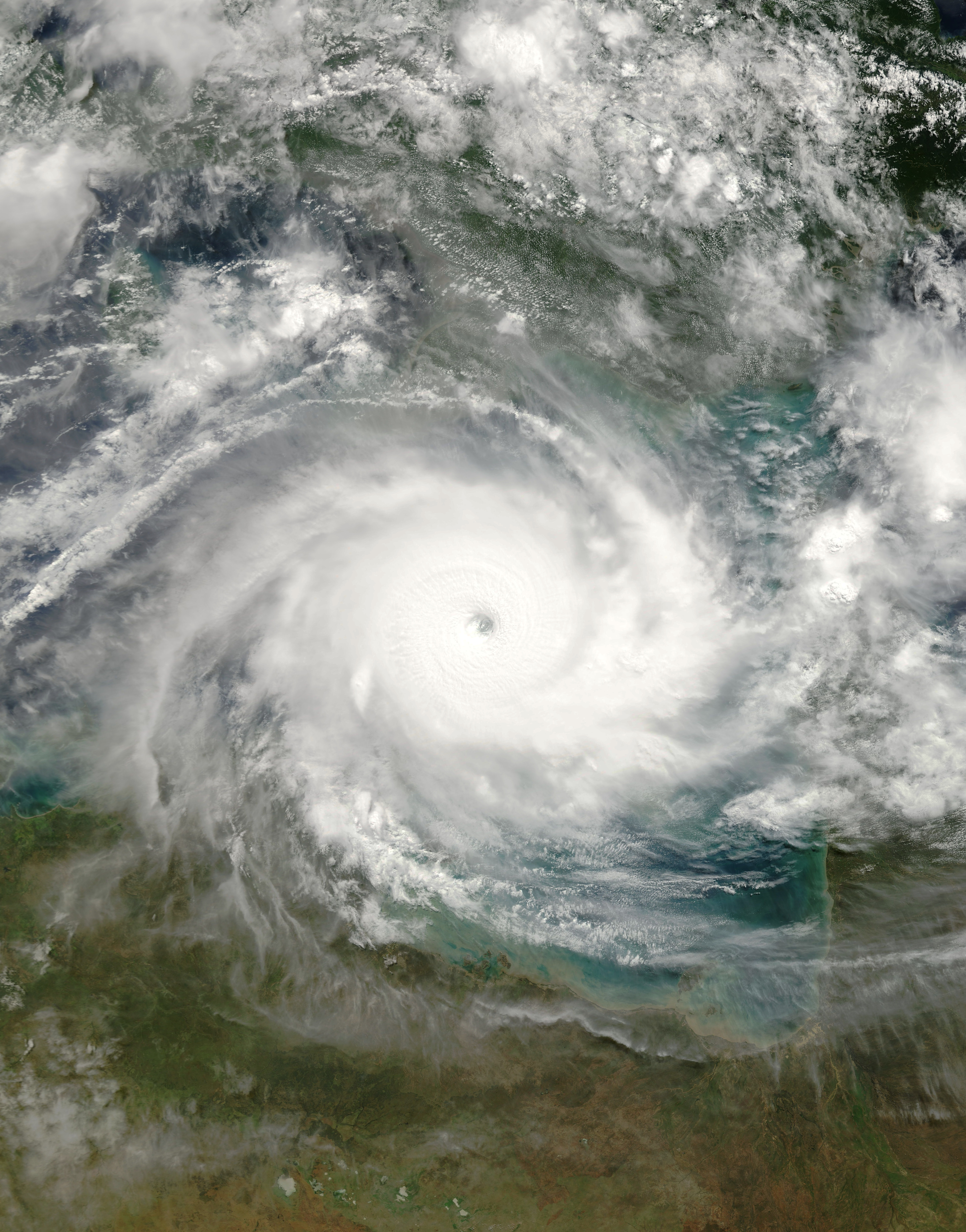
Satellite image of Cyclone Monica near peak intensity off the coast of Northern Territory in April 2006

Name	Category	Date of landfall	Year
Adeline	Category 3	28 January	1973
Wilma	Category 2	14 March	1975
Kim	Category 1	2 December	1976
Tracy	Category 4	24 December	1974
Rosa	Category 3	3 March	1979
Doris	Category 1	17 March	1980
Ferdinand	Category 3	3 March	1984
Jim	Category 3	9 March	1984
Kathy	Category 4	22 March	1984
Sandy	Category 2	25 March	1985
Gretel	Category 2	12 April	1985
Phil	Category 1	26 December	1996
Sid	Category 1	27 December	1997
Les	Category 1	25 January	1998
Thelma	Category 3	11 December	1998
Steve	Category 1	1 March	2000
Winsome	Category 1	10 February	2001
Wylva	Category 1	16 February	2001
Abigail	Category 3	26 February	2001
Craig	Category 2	10 March	2003
Debbie	Category 3	20 December	2003
Fritz	Category 2	12 February	2004
Monty	Category 3	1 March	2004
Evan	Category 1	1 March	2004
Harvey	Category 3	7 February	2005
Ingrid	Category 5	13 March	2005
Monica	Category 5	24 April	2006
Helen	Category 2	4 January	2008
Paul	Category 2	29 March	2010
Grant	Category 2	25 December	2011
Alessia	Category 1	24 November	2013
Lam	Category 4	19 February	2015
Nathan	Category 3	22 March	2015
Marcus	Category 3	16 and 18 March	2018
Owen	Category 3	11 December	2018
Trevor	Category 4	23 March	2019
Tiffany	Category 2	12 January	2022
Ellie	Category 1	22 December	2022
Lincoln	Category 1	16 February	2024
Megan	Category 3	18 March	2024
Fina	Category 2	21 November	2025
Narelle	Category 3	22 March	2026

=== Queensland ===
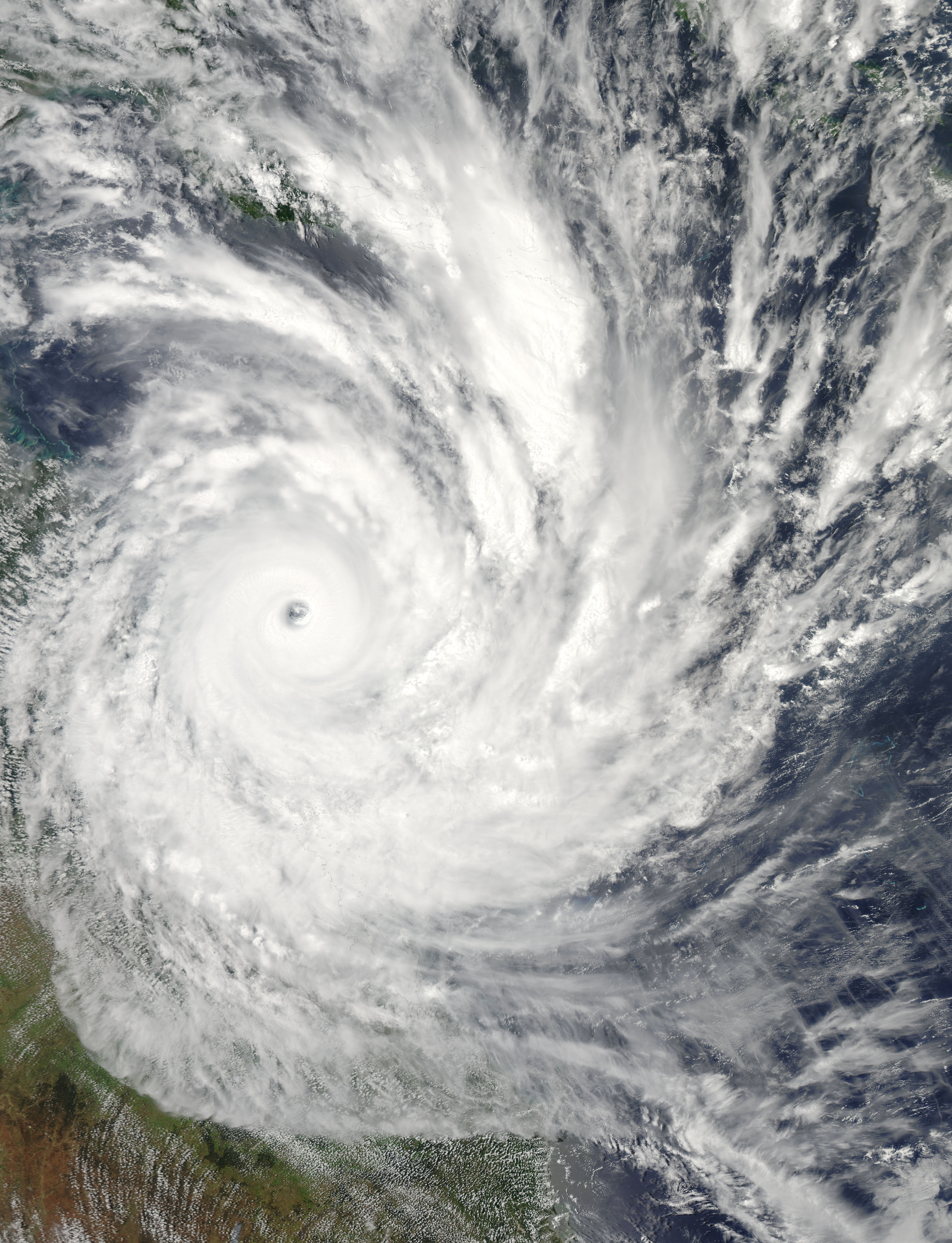
Satellite image of Cyclone Yasi approaching Queensland in February 2011

Name	Category	Date of landfall	Year
Ada	Category 3	17 January	1970
Althea	Category 3	24 December	1971
Daisy	Category 3	11 February	1972
Emily	Category 3	2 April	1972
Madge	Category 3	4 March	1973
Wanda	Category 2	24 January	1974
Yvonne	Category 2	10 February	1974
David	Category 2	19 January	1976
Beth	Category 1	22 February	1976
Dawn	Category 2	5 March	1976
Ted	Category 4	19 December	1977
Otto	Category 1	7&9 March	1977
Gwen	Category 1	27 February	1978
Hal	Category 1	7 April	1978
Peter	Category 1	31 December	1978
Greta	Category 2	10 January	1979
Kerry	Category 2	1 March	1979
Stan	Category 1	13 April	1979
Cliff	Category 1	11 February	1981
Cliff	Category 1	14 February	1981
Dominic	Category 5	7 April	1982
Pierre	Category 3	21 February	1985
Rebecca	Category 3	22 February	1985
Tanya	Category 1	1 April	1985
Winifred	Category 3	1 February	1986
Manu	Category 1	26 April	1986
Jason	Category 2	13 February	1987
Charlie	Category 3	29 February	1988
Aivu	Category 3	4 April	1989
Felicity	Category 1	15 December	1990
Joy	Category 2	December 26	1991
Mark	Category 1	9 January	1992
Fran	Category 2	15 March	1993
Mahina	Category 5	4 March	1899
Sadie	Category 1	30 January	1994
Warren	Category 2	5 March	1995
Barry	Category 3	5 January	1996
Ethel	Category 2	9 March	1997
Justin	Category 2	22 March	1997
May	Category 1	26 February	1998
Rona	Category 3	18 February	1999
Steve	Category 2	27 February	2000
Tessi	Category 3	2 April	2000
Ingrid	Category 4	10 March	2005
Larry	Category 4	20 March	2006
Monica	Category 3	19 April	2006
Nelson	Category 2	6 February	2007
Charlotte	Category 1	12 January	2009
Ellie	Category 1	2 February	2009
Olga	Category 1	30 January	2010
Ului	Category 3	21 March	2010
Tasha	Category 1	25 December	2010
Anthony	Category 2	30 January	2011
Yasi	Category 5	3 February	2011
Oswald	Category 1	21 January	2013
Dylan	Category 2	31 January	2014
Ita	Category 4	11 April	2014
Marcia	Category 5	20 February	2015
Nathan	Category 3	20 March	2015
Debbie	Category 3	28 March	2017
Nora	Category 3	24 March	2018
Owen	Category 3	15 December	2018
Penny	Category 1	1 January	2019
Trevor	Category 4	19 March	2019
Esther	Category 1	23 February	2020
Imogen	Category 2	3 January	2021
Tiffany	Category 1	10 January	2022
Jasper	Category 1	13 December	2023
Kirrily	Category 1	25 January	2025
Alfred	Category 1	7 March	2025
Koji	Category 1	10 January	2026
Narelle	Category 4	20 March	2026

=== Western Australia ===
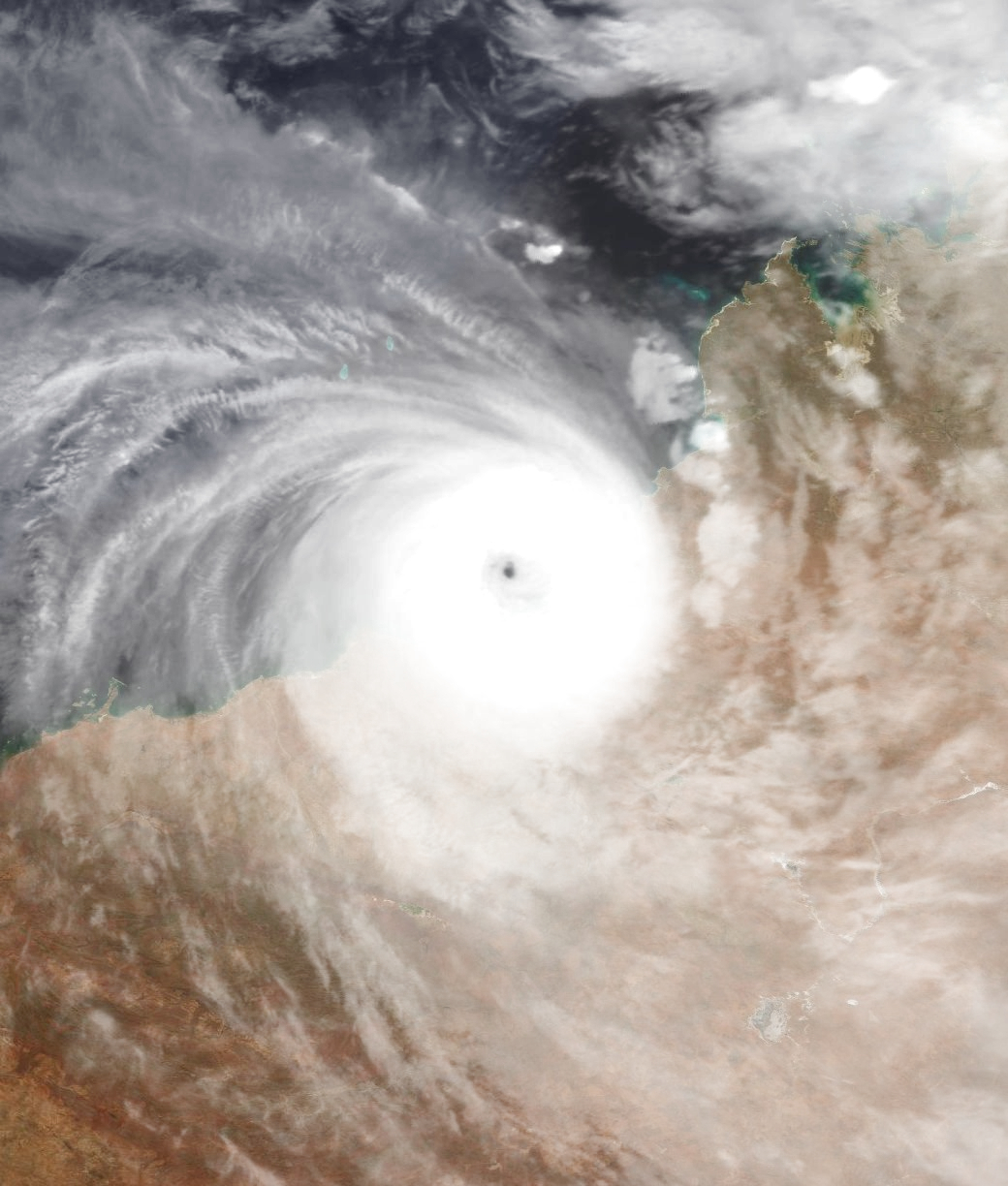
Satellite image of Cyclone Chris striking Western Australia in February 2002

Name	Category	Date of landfall	Year
Kerry	Category 4	21 January	1973
Marcelle	Category 2	8 May	1973
Ines	Category 2	21 November	1973
Erica	Category 2	31 December	1973
Fiona	Category 2	8 January	1974
Trixie	Category 4	19 February	1975
Beverly	Category 3	31 March	1975
Joan	Category 5	7 December	1975
Wally	Category 2	27 February	1976
Leo	Category 4	26 March	1977
Vern	Category 3	1 February	1978
Hazel	Category 4	13 March	1979
Amy	Category 5	10 January	1980
Dean	Category 4	1 February	1980
Enid	Category 4	17 February	1980
Bruno	Category 2	19 January	1982
Graham	Category 2	31 January	1982
Ian	Category 2	6 March	1982
Jane	Category 4	9 January	1983
Ken	Category 3	2 March	1983
Lena	Category 2	7 April	1983
Quenton	Category 4	29 November	1983
Chloe	Category 3	29 February	1984
Frank	Category 2	27 December	1985
Gertie	Category 3	31 January	1985
Lindsay	Category 3	9 March	1985
Hector	Category 1	19 January	1986
Connie	Category 3	19 January	1987
Elsie	Category 4	25 February	1987
Ilona	Category 3	17 March	1988
Orson	Category 4	22 April	1989
Tina	Category 2	27 January	1990
Ian	Category 3	2 March	1992
Naomi	Category 3	17 December	1993
Annette	Category 4	18 December	1994
Bobby	Category 3	25 February	1995
Chloe	Category 3	7 April	1995
Gertie	Category 3	20 December	1995
Kirsty	Category 4	12 March	1996
Olivia	Category 4	10 April	1996
Rachel	Category 3	11 January	1997
Les	Category 1	29 January	1998
Vance	Category 4	22 March	1999
Gwenda	Category 2	7 April	1999
Ilsa	Category 1	17 December	1999
John	Category 5	15 December	1999
Steve	Category 1	6&9 March	2000
Vance	Category 5	22 March	2000
Rosita	Category 4	19 April	2000
Sam	Category 5	8 December	2000
Terri	Category 2	31 January	2001
Chris	Category 5	6 March	2002
Graham	Category 1	28 February	2003
Fay	Category 4	27 March	2004
Raymond	Category 1	2 January	2005
Ingrid	Category 4	15 March	2005
Clare	Category 1	9 January	2006
Emma	Category 1	27 February	2006
Glenda	Category 3	30 March	2006
Hubert	Category 1	1 April	2006
George	Category 5	8 March	2007
Nicholas	Category 2	20 February	2008
Billy	Category 2	22 December	2008
Dominic	Category 2	27 January	2009
Laurence	Category 5	21 December	2009
Magda	Category 3	21 January	2010
Carlos	Category 2	22 January	2011
Heidi	Category 3	11 January	2012
Lua	Category 3	17 March	2012
Rusty	Category 3	27 February	2013
Christine	Category 4	31 December	2013
Olwyn	Category 3	13 March	2015
Stan	Category 2	31 January	2016
Blanche	Category 2	6 March	2017
Unnamed	Category 1	23 March	2017
Hilda	Category 2	28 December	2017
Joyce	Category 2	12 January	2018
Kelvin	Category 3	18 February	2018
Blake	Category 1	6 January	2020
Damien	Category 3	8 February	2020
Seroja	Category 3	11 April	2021
Anika	Category 2	25 January	2022
Ilsa	Category 5	13 April	2023
Zelia	Category 4	14 February	2025
Dianne	Category 2	29 March	2025
Fina	Category 3	23 November	2025
Hayley	Category 3	30 December	2025
Luana	Category 2	24 January	2026
Narelle	Category 4	27 March	2026

== See also ==
- Tropical cyclone effects by region
