= New Year Island (Northern Territory) =

Island in the Northern Territory, Australia

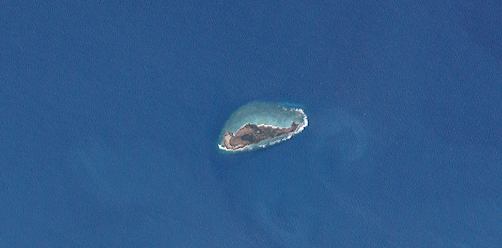
- LANDSAT true color image of New Year Island Group, Northern Territory, Australia

- Location within Northern Territory

Geography
- Location: Arafura Sea
- Coordinates: 10.908°S 133.031°E

Administration
- Australia
- State: Northern Territory
- Region: Top End

New Year Island is a low-lying, uninhabited island in the Arafura Sea. It is part of the Northern Territory of Australia, and is 294 km north-east of Darwin, and 50 km east of Croker Island. It is approximately 2 km long, and 800 metres wide.

Like all islands in the Croker Group, New Year Island is Aboriginal freehold land, held by the Arnhem Land Aboriginal Land Trust.

New Year Island is noteworthy in that a small rock 60 metres to its north is the northernmost land in the Northern Territory.

== See also ==
- List of islands of Australia
