= Croker Island Airport =

Airport off north coast of Australia

- IATA: CKI; ICAO: YCKI

Summary
- Airport type: Public
- Operator: Minjilang Community Inc.
- Serves: Minjilang, Northern Territory, Australia
- Location: Croker Island, Australia
- Elevation AMSL: 51 ft / 16 m
- Coordinates: 11°09′54″S 132°29′00″E

Map
- Location in the Northern Territory

Runways
Direction	Length		Surface
Direction	m	ft	Surface
13/31	1,433	4,701	Asphalt
- Sources: AIP

Croker Island Airport (IATA: CKI, ICAO: YCKI) is located on the west side of Croker Island, in the Northern Territory, Australia.

== Airlines and destinations ==
Airlines	Destinations
Fly Tiwi	Darwin, Warruwi

== See also ==
- List of airports in the Northern Territory
