= South Goulburn Island Airport =

- IATA: GBL; ICAO: YGBI

Summary
- Airport type: Public
- Operator: Warruwi Community Inc.
- Location: Goulburn Islands
- Elevation AMSL: 63 ft / 19 m
- Coordinates: 11°39′00″S 133°22′54″E

Map
- Location in Northern Territory

Runways
Direction	Length		Surface
Direction	m	ft	Surface
10/28	1,400	4,593	Asphalt
- Sources: Australian AIP

South Goulburn Island Airport (IATA: GBL, ICAO: YGBI) serves the Goulburn Islands, Northern Territory, Australia.

== Airlines and destinations ==
Fly Tiwi runs a triangular service, on weekdays, between Darwin, Croker Island and South Goulburn Island.

Airlines	Destinations
Fly Tiwi	Darwin, Minjilang (Croker Island)
