= Croker Group =

Islands in Northern Territory, Australia

- Location within Northern Territory

Geography
- Location: Arafura Sea
- Coordinates: 11.1°S 132.7°E

Administration
- Australia
- State: Northern Territory
- Region: Top End

The Croker Group is a group of islands in the Arafura Sea. The group lies offshore from Cobourg Peninsula, and is part of the Northern Territory of Australia. The group is Aboriginal freehold land, held by the Arnhem Land Aboriginal Land Trust.

The group consists of at least 12 named islands, and a number of small unnamed islands and rocks. By far the largest island of the group is Croker Island, which has an area of 331 km^{2}. Croker Island is also the only permanently inhabited island in the group. None of the other islands in the group is larger than 15 km^{2}.

== List of Islands ==
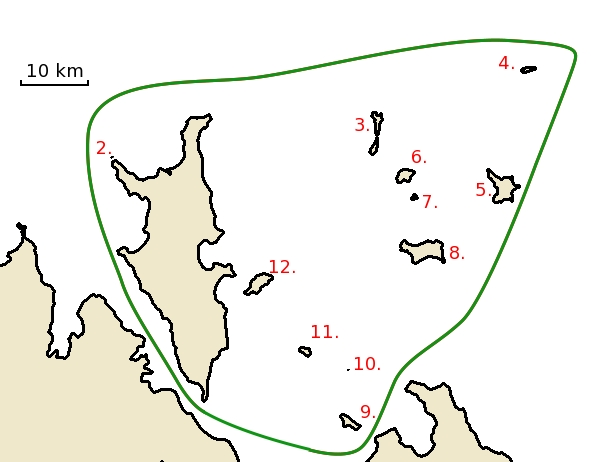
Location Map of Croker Island Group, Northern Territory, Australia: 1. Croker Island; 2. Peacock Island; 3. Oxley Island; 4. New Year Island; 5. McCluer Island; 6. Lawson Island; 7. Delphinia Island; 8. Grant Island; 9. Valencia Island; 10. Cowlard Island; 11. Templer Island; 12. Darch Island

Name	Area	Location
Croker Island	331 km^{2}	11.1333331°S 132.55°E
Peacock Island	0.09 km^{2}	11.025°S 132.458°E
Oxley Island	2 km^{2}	11.00°S 132.826°E
New Year Island	1 km^{2}	10.908°S 133.031°E
McCluer Island	9 km^{2}	11.07°S 133.0°E
Lawson Island	3 km^{2}	11.05°S 132.86°E
Delphinia Island	0.6 km^{2}	11.0823°S 132.8775°E
Grant Island	12 km^{2}	11.156°S 132.89°E
Valencia Island	3 km^{2}	11.383°S 132.785°E
Cowlard Island	0.02 km^{2}	11.31669°S 132.78366°E
Templer Island	1 km^{2}	11.28927°S 132.727976°E
Darch Island	6 km^{2}	11.19519°S 132.662578°E

== See also ==
- List of islands of Australia
