= Margaret Anne Somerville =

Australian Methodist missionary (1912–2014)

Margaret Anne Somerville MBE (24 September 1912 – 6 August 2014) was an Australian missionary who worked as a cottage mother at the Croker Island Mission run by the Methodist Overseas Mission. She is best remembered for her bravery in assisting with the evacuation of 95 Aboriginal children from there during the Bombing of Darwin in World War II. This evacuation is commonly referred to as the 'Croker Island Exodus'.

She returned to Croker Island in 1946 and remained there until 1965.

She recorded her experiences in the book: They crossed a continent : 3,000 miles with 95 children (1967). In 2011 a third edition, They crossed a continent, the story of a wartime exodus from Croker Island to Sydney was published including a historical introduction and postscript by historians Peter and Sheila Forest.

She was also interviewed by the National Library of Australia in 2001 as part of the Bringing them home oral history project.

== Early life ==
Somerville was born in Lismore in 1912 and was the daughter of James Herbert and Margaret Jessie Somerville. Her father was a Methodist Minister and they moved regularly throughout her childhood throughout New South Wales with the most time spent in Newcastle and Sydney. She had two younger brothers.

From her father's influence, she was interested in missions from an early age and felt called to serve God in this way. In her oral history recording she recalls having particular skills in handwork, which she used to sell to local shops, and that she viewed these as important skills she had to offer in a mission role. Before moving to Croker Island she also used the sale of her handwork to fundraise for the Bible Society Australia.

She saw the role at Croker Island advertised in the Missionary Review in August 1941 and, after applying she was initially afraid she would not be accepted to the role as she had no training. However, the Methodist Overseas Mission were looking for someone to teach the children cooking and sewing and, as these were areas where she did well, so she was successful. She said of this:

They're wanting someone to go up to help with the older girls, until they get the idea of cooking and so on, and looking after the younger children"

— Margaret Somerville, oral history Interview, LANT NTRS 226 TS 713

The Methodist Overseas Mission also selected Somerville as they wanted Croker Island to be as close to home as possible for the children living there, with circumstances resembling conventional family life as much as possible. To do this they sought committed members of the church who would guide and encourage the children. It was initially a temporary appointment.

== Life in the Northern Territory ==
Somerville began working at Croker Island Mission when it was first opened and arrived there in November 1941 when she was 29 years old. To take up the role she initially travelled from Sydney to Darwin on the Merkur, a journey of approximately 10 days, and then on to Goulburn Island (to pick up more children) before then sailing on to Croker Island. Children at the home were from throughout the Northern Territory and many came from institutions such as The Bungalow (in Alice Springs) and the Kahlin Compound (in Darwin); they were all Aboriginal children who were considered 'part-Aboriginal' by the policies of the day.

In Croker Island work had not been completed on the accommodation or facilities and many were 'shells' with no flooring. The decision to move there was expedited by the lead up to the tropical Wet Season and, soon after, the attack on Pearl Harbor.

The time spent there was short-lived with a civilian evacuation order sent through on 13 February 1942 asking that all women and children leave the region at once. Darwin was bombed, for the first time in the war, on 19 February 1942 and, despite knowing the children had to be evacuated, there was no naval shipping available to assist them.

On 3 March 1942 many of the children and missionaries were evacuated on the mission lugger, the Larrpan, but Somerville elected to stay with the remaining children, alongside Jess March, Beryl Adams and Sister Olive Peake. In a diary entry on 7 March 1942 Somerville wrote:

Learned that Darwin is almost off the map. 72 planes did a great deal of damage. Discussed making shelter in jungle in case this place bombed".

— Margaret Somerville, 7 March 1942, NTRS 1432 Diary entries of Margaret Somerville

The need to evacuate was becoming increasingly urgent as sea supply routes to Darwin were closed and the overland supply route, now the Stuart Highway, struggled to cope with the increase in traffic.

On 7 April 1942 they were picked up by the Larrpan to begin their journey to Sydney; they were initially dropped at Barclay Point, opposite Goulburn Island. On this trip Somerville's practical skills were viewed as invaluable as she organised and assisted with the preparation of large amounts of food, preparing meals for 100 people in difficult conditions.

Their journey to Sydney took 6 weeks overland and Somerville's group included missionaries and 99 children (more had joined when they passed through Alice Springs). One child died of a cerebral haemorrhage following a fall at Oenpelli and Somerville discusses this incident in her oral history. They had walked to Oenpelli and went by army truck to Alice Springs and then via rail to Sydney.

When they arrived in Sydney Somerville was excited to present the children to her mother and recalled:

I don't know how we did it. It was just living one day at a time. I loved the work with the children. That was my calling and I believe it was right and I enjoyed every minute of it.

— Margaret Somerville, Interview with ABC Local

The children were sent to live at the Crusader's Camp in Otford and Somerville became an assistant supervisor there. During their time there two of the children were found to have leprosy and sent to Prince Henry Hospital and another died during surgery to remove his tonsils.

She returned to Croker Island in 1946, after the end of the war, and was the only member of the original group of missionaries to do so. Significant works and improvements had been done during their absence and Somerville wrote of their return:

It was wonderful when we got back. Everything had gone ahead, it wasn't like it had been before the war. We went on a tour of inspection with Rupert Kentish and were amazed at the amount of work that had been done. It was thrilling to be shown over and to know it was ours! ... it all gave me a sense of joy and pride. The finished cottages were very nice, large, airy and cool... The spirit among the children was wonderful, they were as happy as can be and each on proud of the own cottage and anxious to make it the best. In my wildest dreams I did not imagine things so comfortable or the children so happy

— Margaret Somerville, letter, 24 April 1946, NTRS 1430 Correspondence from Croker Island via Darwin

She worked there for another 20 years.

Connie Cole, one of the children evacuated had nothing but praise for Somerville and said: "[s]he was the most wonderful woman that I ever come across". Another former resident Louise Neave (née Goodall) wrote a letter which was published in the NT News (20 October 1994) stated that:

The early missionaries who looked after us did everything in their power to make our lives as happy as they could... the women missionaries were young women who tried to love us as their own children. They were very dedicated, they stuck to us through thick and thin. When the war broke out, they didn't abandon us, they prepared us to walk for hundreds of miles... I would like to take the opportunity to thank those people. I would like to thank Sister Somerville, Sister Peake, Miss March, Mr Wade, Mr Adams and Reverend Len Kentish... these people played a big part in our lives... I thank them with love.

— Louise Neave (née Goodall), as quoted in the postscript to "They crossed a continent, the story of a wartime exodus from Croker Island to Sydney" (2011)

== Later life ==
In 1965 Somerville retired and returned to Sydney where she took care of her parents. Croker Island Mission closed soon after, in 1968, and children were transferred to Somerville Cottage Homes in Darwin and to placements interstate.

She continued to be involved in the church and mission activities. She visited the Northern Territory regularly.

She died 6 August 2014 at the age of 101 on the Central Coast, New South Wales.

== Recognition ==
- In 1965 she was made a Member of the Order of the British Empire for her services to isolated children.
- In 1991 she received the Battle of Australia Medallion; she was the first Australian woman to do so.

== Legacy ==
The Somerville Cottages, also known as the Somerville Homes, established by the Uniting Church and the Methodist Overseas Mission, were named for Somerville. These were six cottages, in the suburbs of Darwin, that accommodated children in a 'family group setting' under the care of cottage parents; they operated from 1968 until the 1980s.

Her name is also used by Somerville Community Services, a disability services organisation in the Northern Territory.

She is a signatory on the Darwin Commemorative Wall Quilt held by Library & Archives NT.

== Resources ==
- Somerville, Margaret & Forrest, Peter, 1941- & Methodist Church of Australasia. Department of Overseas Missions (1967). They crossed a continent : 3,000 miles with 95 children. Methodist Overseas Missions, [Sydney]
- Somerville, Margaret, 1912- & Heimans, Frank, 1943-. (2001). Margaret Somerville interviewed by Frank Heimans in the Bringing them home oral history project [sound recording]. http://nla.gov.au/nla.obj-218420997

A full list of Northern Territory Evacuees from Northern Territory, including the children from Croker Island, is available online through the National Archives of Australia via this link.
