= Cyclone Nora =

Tropical cyclone in Australia in 2018

Severe Tropical Cyclone Nora
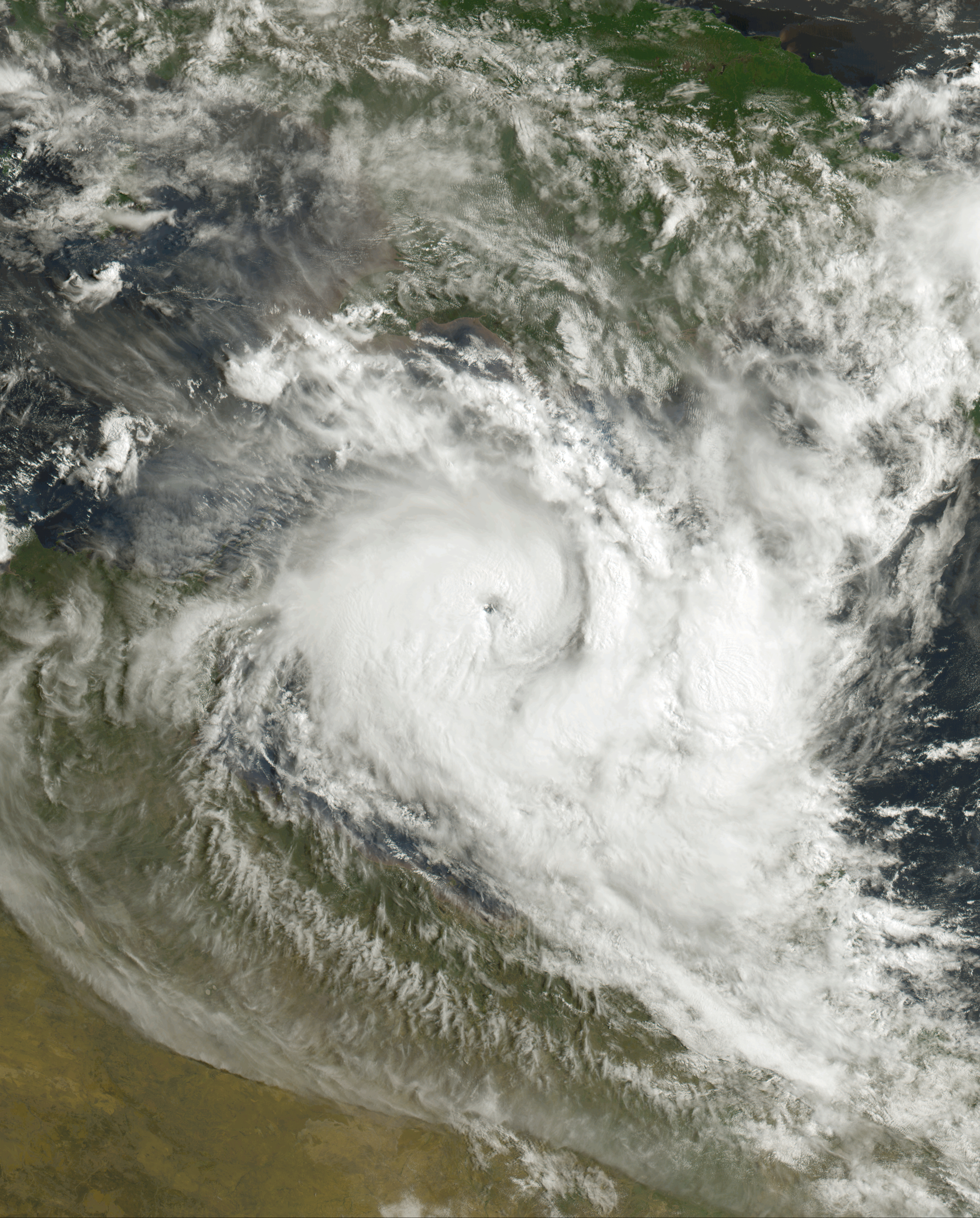
- Nora at peak intensity over the Gulf of Carpentaria on 24 March 2018

Meteorological history
- Formed: 19 March 2018
- Remnant low: 25 March 2018
- Dissipated: 26 March 2018

Category 3 severe tropical cyclone
- 10-minute sustained (BOM)
- Highest winds: 155 km/h (100 mph)
- Highest gusts: 220 km/h (140 mph)
- Lowest pressure: 960 hPa (mbar); 28.35 inHg

Category 3-equivalent tropical cyclone
- 1-minute sustained (SSHWS/JTWC)
- Highest winds: 185 km/h (115 mph)
- Lowest pressure: 956 hPa (mbar); 28.23 inHg

Overall effects
- Fatalities: None
- Damage: >$25 million (2018 USD)
- Areas affected: New Guinea, Aru Islands, Northern Territory, Queensland
- IBTrACS /
- Part of the 2017–18 Australian region cyclone season

Severe Tropical Cyclone Nora was a strong tropical cyclone that affected Far North Queensland and the northeastern Northern Territory, both in Australia, during March 2018. The ninth named storm and third severe tropical cyclone of the 2017–18 Australian region cyclone season, Nora developed from a tropical low which formed near the Torres Strait on 19 March. The system initially moved quickly to the west-northwest, and then began tracking slowly southwestwards over the Arafura Sea while gradually developing. A turn to the east on 22 March brought the tropical low into a favourable environment for strengthening, and the system reached tropical cyclone intensity later that day. Nora then underwent a period of rapid intensification as it moved southeastwards into the Gulf of Carpentaria. The storm peaked on 23 March as a high-end Category 3 severe tropical cyclone with sustained winds of 155 km/h (96 mph) and a minimum barometric pressure of 958 hPa (28.29 inHg). Nora made landfall north of Pormpuraaw at about 13:00 UTC on 24 March as a minimal Category 3 system. Nora weakened steadily as it tracked southwards along the coast, and was downgraded to a tropical low the following day. Nora's remnants meandered over land for several days before moving back over the Gulf of Carpentaria and dissipating on 28 March.

Nora was responsible for major impacts across large parts of Far North Queensland. Strong winds knocked down many trees and power lines in the towns of Pormpuraaw, Kowanyama and Mapoon, blocking roads and cutting power to more than 500 homes. Damage was caused to houses, council buildings, personal property and other buildings. Very heavy rainfall occurred across most of Cape York Peninsula and Far North Queensland. Many communities became isolated by floodwaters after roads were either blocked or damaged. Extreme rainfall fell in parts of Queensland's east coast, including 593.0 mm (23.35 in) in just 24 hours in Port Douglas. Flash flooding occurred in Cairns as a result of the intense rainfall, including in car parks, shopping centres and hotels. The torrential rain caused landslides that blocked highways in the region. Many people had to be rescued by emergency services after becoming trapped by floodwaters. Agricultural losses in crops and livestock, as well as damage to infrastructure, were also sustained when farms were flooded. The total economic impact of Severe Tropical Cyclone Nora is estimated to have exceeded AU$32.5 million (US$25 million).

== Meteorological history ==
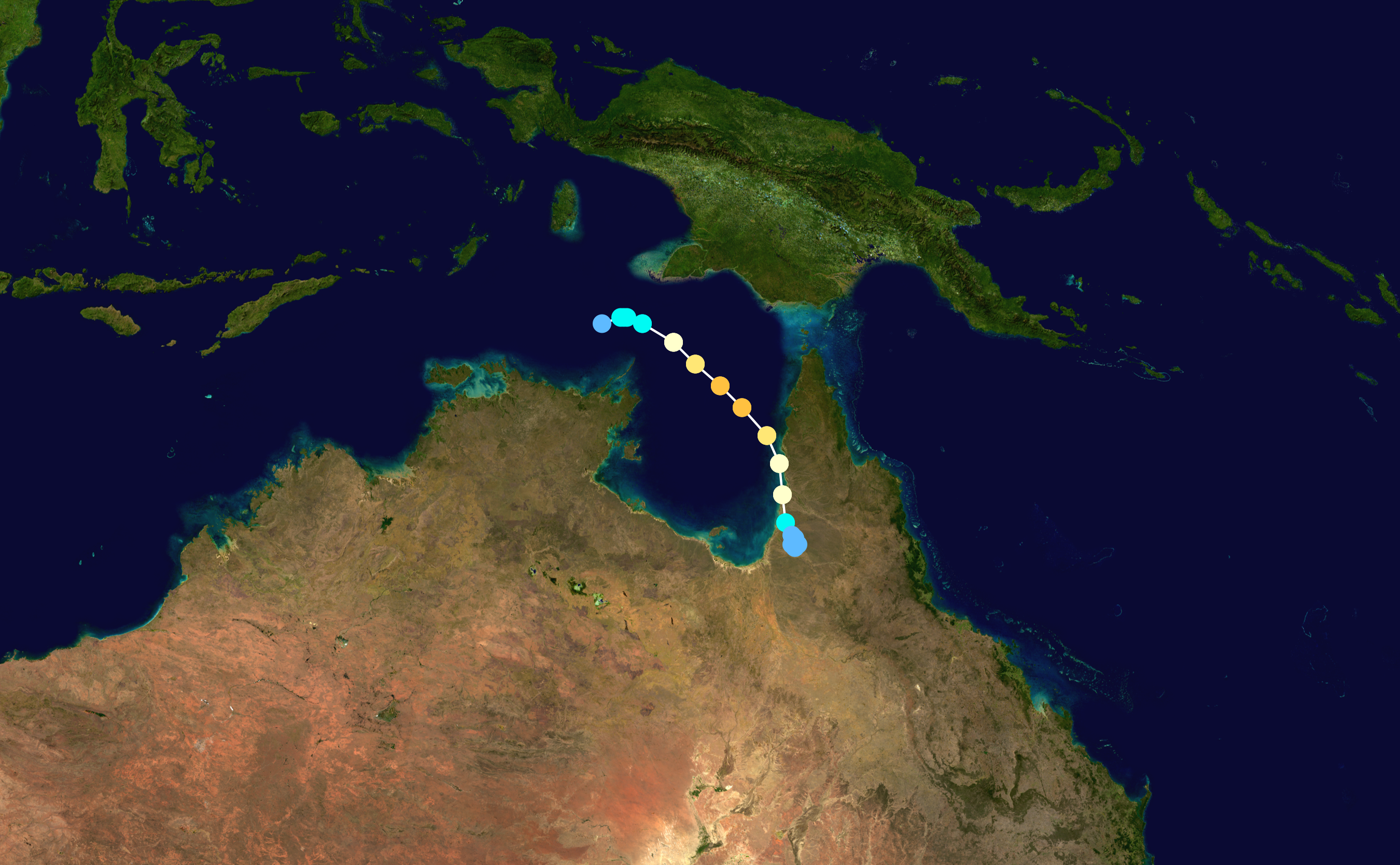
Map plotting the storm's track and intensity, according to the Saffir–Simpson scale Map key Saffir–Simpson scale Tropical depression (≤38 mph, ≤62 km/h) Tropical storm (39–73 mph, 63–118 km/h) Category 1 (74–95 mph, 119–153 km/h) Category 2 (96–110 mph, 154–177 km/h) Category 3 (111–129 mph, 178–208 km/h) Category 4 (130–156 mph, 209–251 km/h) Category 5 (≥157 mph, ≥252 km/h) Unknown Storm type Tropical cyclone Subtropical cyclone Extratropical cyclone, remnant low, tropical disturbance, or monsoon depression

Several atmospheric features and climate drivers which are typically conducive to tropical cyclogenesis were present in Australian longitudes during March 2018. In early- to mid-March, a monsoon trough developed to the north of Australia, stretching from the eastern Indonesian archipelago to the northern Coral Sea. Although associated convective activity decreased somewhat as the monsoon trough began to weaken, this was offset by the interaction of significant cross-equatorial flow from the Northern Hemisphere with a large area of strong southeasterly wind from the Australian continent. The convergence of these winds provided ample rotational energy for the development of any low-pressure systems in the region. Reinforced by the effects of a westwards-propagating Rossby wave, the southeasterly wind flow contributed to enhanced atmospheric circulation over the tropical waters. In addition, the presence of a weak but discernible pulse of the Madden-Julian Oscillation in the Maritime Continent supported the generation of cloudy weather and increased atmospheric instability in the region.

Monsoonal activity began to restrengthen later in the month, and on 19 March the Australian Bureau of Meteorology (BOM) noted that a tropical low had developed in the vicinity of the Torres Strait, embedded within the monsoon trough. The newly formed tropical low moved quickly to the west-northwest along the southwestern coast of New Guinea, and was centred just off the coast of Indonesia's Pulau Dolak island by 00:00 UTC on 20 March. The system then began to track slowly southwestwards across the eastern Arafura Sea while its central barometric pressure steadily deepened. At 18:30 UTC, the Joint Typhoon Warning Center (JTWC) issued a tropical cyclone formation alert, and indicated that the likelihood of rapid intensification over the following days was high. On 22 March, the tropical low assumed a course towards the east, bringing it into an environment which was increasingly favourable for further development. Fuelled by sea-surface temperatures of approximately 29 °C (84 °F), the low-level circulation centre quickly consolidated as convective banding wrapped into the developing system. The JTWC indicated that the system had reached tropical storm strength on the Saffir-Simpson hurricane wind scale at 06:00 UTC, and gave it the designation Tropical Cyclone 16P. Six hours later, the system was officially upgraded to a Category 1 tropical cyclone and was assigned the name Nora by the BOM.

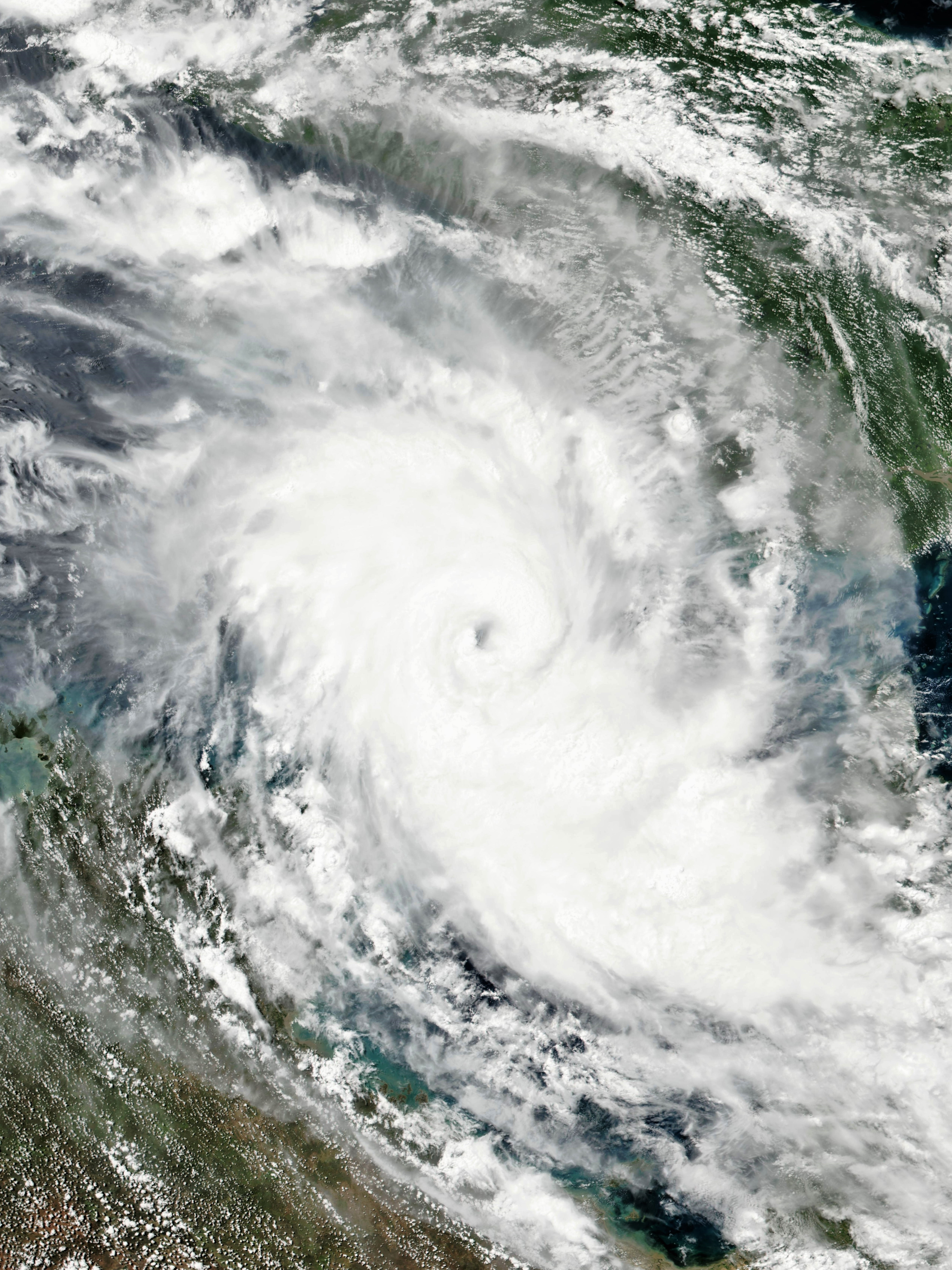
Nora rapidly intensifying over the eastern Arafura Sea on 23 March.

As Nora passed slowly to the north of the Wessel Islands in a weak steering environment, the already supportive environmental conditions became extremely favourable for strengthening. A co-located anticyclone in the upper troposphere provided excellent poleward and equatorward outflow channels for the system in an environment of low vertical wind shear, and sea surface temperatures and ocean heat content had both become favourably high. Nora began to rapidly intensify, reaching Category 2 strength on the Australian scale at 00:00 UTC on 23 March as a primitive eye began to emerge on visible-light satellite imagery. Shortly thereafter, Nora turned southeastwards under the influence of a strengthening high-pressure ridge to the east. The BOM upgraded the storm to a Category 3 severe tropical cyclone at 09:00 UTC, just after one-minute sustained winds had reached the equivalent of minimal hurricane intensity. Over the following three hours, Nora underwent explosive intensification, with maximum ten-minute sustained winds increasing by an average of 5 knots (9.3 km/h; 5.8 mph) every hour. Nora peaked in intensity as it entered the Gulf of Carpentaria, reaching high-end Category 3 severe tropical cyclone status on the Australian scale. The BOM estimated ten-minute sustained winds to be at 155 km/h (96 mph), gusting to 220 km/h (140 mph), with a minimum central pressure of 960 hPa (28.35 inHg). Concurrently, the JTWC indicated that one-minute sustained winds had reached 185 km/h (115 mph), equivalent to a Category 3 major hurricane on the Saffir-Simpson hurricane wind scale.

Shortly after reaching peak intensity, Nora began to undergo an eyewall replacement cycle, causing the intensification trend to cease. Despite the very warm waters in the Gulf of Carpentaria, diminishing upper-level outflow caused the system to begin weakening by 03:00 UTC on 24 March. Drier air from Cape York Peninsula also became entrained into the circulation as Nora approached the coast, contributing to the storm's decline in intensity. Nora made landfall in Far North Queensland at about 13:00 UTC on 24 March as a low-end Category 3 system, approximately 55 km (34 mi) north of the town of Pormpuraaw. After moving ashore, the cyclone turned generally southwards, and tracked along the coastline of the Gulf Country. The system was downgraded to a tropical low by the BOM at 06:00 UTC the following day as it approached the mouth of the Gilbert River. The development of a competing steering environment associated with a strengthening ridge over central Australia caused Ex-Tropical Cyclone Nora to become quasi-stationary from 25 to 27 March. The system's remnant low-pressure system re-emerged over the southern Gulf of Carpentaria on 28 March, but was unable to restrengthen. It dissipated near Mornington Island later that day.

Nora was the storm to make landfall on Queensland's Gulf of Carpentaria coast since Tropical Cyclone Abigail in 2001. It was also the strongest tropical cyclone in the Gulf of Carpentaria since Severe Tropical Cyclone Monica in 2006.

== Preparations ==
Tropical cyclones in the Gulf of Carpentaria can be relatively unpredictable in their motion, and are often difficult to forecast. As a result, tropical cyclone watches and warnings were issued for the entire Gulf coast of Queensland and the northeastern Top End when Nora intensified into a tropical cyclone. Early forecasts also predicted that Nora would stay offshore for much longer while tracking into the southeastern Gulf of Carpentaria. Forecasts indicated that the system could have strengthened into a powerful Category 4 severe tropical cyclone if this scenario were to have eventuated. Residents were warned that Nora had the potential to cause major impacts due to its predicted intensity, size and direction of motion. The BOM indicated that storm surge and large waves posed a potential threat to coastal communities in the path of the system, and that inundation of low-lying areas on the shoreline was possible. Residents were also warned that widespread heavy rainfall was anticipated, with isolated daily falls of up to 300 mm (12 in) possible in some areas.

Due to the potential for communities to become isolated by flooding, emergency electricity generators were installed near critical infrastructure and buildings such as schools, hospitals, accommodation facilities and some council buildings. Additional Queensland Police Service (QPS) officers and other emergency services personnel were also deployed to communities in Far North Queensland in order to assist with cyclone preparations and maintain safety during the cyclone. The Queensland Fire and Emergency Services (QFES) assembled several rapid response and swift water rescue teams in preparation for the cyclone. These teams were able to respond to calls for assistance from endangered residents by air within four hours, and were equipped to be self-sufficient for up to 48 hours if required. The local council in Croydon also installed retaining walls across roads in order to redirect the flow of floodwaters.

Despite the region being one of the most cyclone-prone areas of Australia, Mornington Island, located in the southeastern Gulf of Carpentaria, did not have a suitable cyclone shelter for residents to evacuate to. In the interest of safety, the local government offered an additional flight to Cairns for any residents who wished to evacuate. As a precaution, Queensland Health evacuated a total of 25 patients from medical facilities in Mornington Island, Pormpuraaw and Kowanyama, including pregnant women, dialysis patients and vulnerable elderly residents. An evacuation shelter was also prepared in Darwin, the Northern Territory's capital, to accommodate for potential evacuations from towns in the northeastern Top End. The Queensland Government's closed state schools in Pormpuraaw, Kowanyama, Karumba and Burketown prior to the arrival of the cyclone in order to protect students and teachers.

== Impacts ==
=== Queensland ===
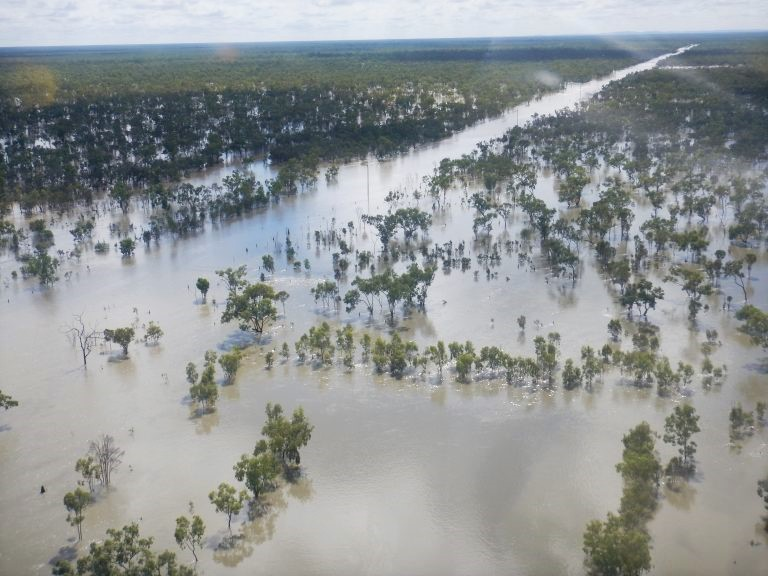
Flooding to the west of Croydon from torrential rainfall generated by Nora.

Nora was the first tropical cyclone to make landfall on Queensland's Gulf of Carpentaria coastline since Tropical Cyclone Oswald in 2013, and the first to do so at Category 3 or higher since Severe Tropical Cyclone Abigail in 2001. After making landfall, Nora tracked southwards along the coast, passing just to the east of Pormpuraaw at Category 3 intensity, and then west of Kowanyama as a Category 2 system. Neither town experienced the full strength of the cyclone; however, strong winds were still experienced in both communities. Kowanyama was subjected to sustained gale-force winds in the early morning of 25 March, and the local airport recorded a maximum wind gust of 100 km/h (62 mph) just before 18:00 UTC.

Pormpuraaw sustained the worst damage of all the towns on the Gulf coast, with damage to vegetation, buildings and infrastructure exceeding what had been expected. Significant vegetation damage was sustained throughout the town, with many trees being knocked over by the strong winds, including numerous large fig and mango trees. Several buildings were damaged by the falling trees, including the local shop and a council building. Many other properties, including houses, only narrowly avoided damage from other falling trees. Houses, community homes, other government buildings, the local school and personal property such as corrugated iron sheds sustained damage from the strong winds. Some vehicles were also damaged by wind and vegetation debris, and the local radio station's satellite dish was destroyed. The town's electricity network was largely destroyed, with many power lines being toppled by strong winds and falling trees. As a result, all 230 properties in Pormpuraaw lost power, as well as the local sewage treatment plant. Running water and conventional communications were also cut, forcing residents to rely on bottled water, radios and satellite phones. Many roads were blocked by flooding and the large number of downed trees and power lines, rendering movement around the town hazardous.

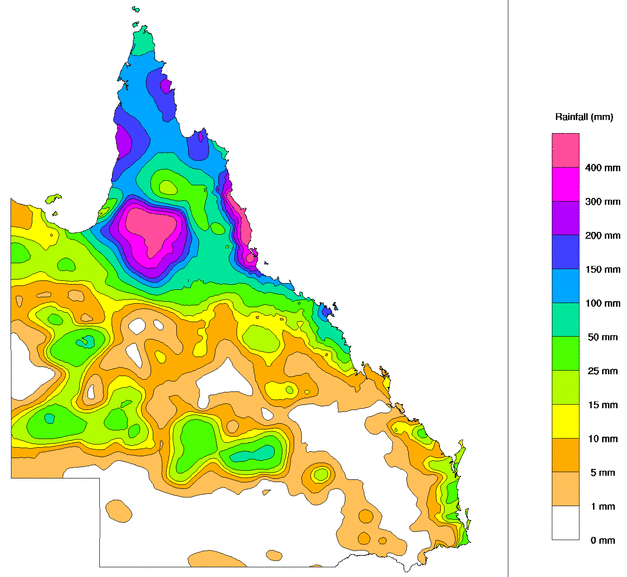
The total rainfall accumulation in Queensland during the seven days leading up to 30 March 2018.

Other towns in the region also sustained damage. Mapoon, situated about 265 km (165 mi) north of where Nora made landfall, was the first place to lose electricity during the storm, with 30 properties losing power. In Kowanyama, three electrical feeders were shut down after sparking was reported, causing 250 properties to lose power. At least five houses in the town sustained damage from strong winds, as well as at least five pieces of infrastructure. Queensland Health reported that the medical clinics in Pormpuraaw and Kowanyama had both sustained damage; however, this was deemed to be only superficial in nature, and they were able to reopen the day after the cyclone. Nora also produced a large amount of rainfall. Kowanyama Airport recorded 128.2 mm (5.05 in) of precipitation during the 24 hours to 23:00 UTC on 24 March. Heavy monsoonal rainfall earlier in the month had already saturated local catchment areas, and rivers were susceptible to rising from further rainfall. Many roads in Pormpuraaw and Kowanyama became flooded and damaged, as well as roads between towns, causing several communities to become isolated and inaccessible by land. Several roads in other parts of Cape York Peninsula and Far North Queensland were also affected by floodwaters, such as near the towns of Coen, Lockhart River and Croydon. The level of Magnificent Creek also rose to about 2 m (6.6 ft) higher than normal from the rainfall. A storm surge of 1.2 m (3.9 ft) was recorded at the town of Weipa on the northern side of the cyclone, as well as large waves. Concerns were initially held for a boat that had ventured into the northern Gulf of Carpentaria during the cyclone; however, all passengers were accounted for after contact was made with the captain. Some livestock also escaped their enclosures in Kowanyama during the storm, including a bull and a horse.

Highest 24-hour rainfall totals
Location	Rainfall	
Location	(mm)	(in)
Port Douglas	593.0	23.3
Abingdon Downs Station	405.0	15.9
Kuranda	403.0	15.9
Mossman	381.0	15.0
Miranda Downs Station	371.0	14.6
Tully	360.0	14.2
Wangetti	349.2	13.7
Whyanbeel	325.8	12.8
Diwan	307.0	12.1
Japoonvale	300.0	11.8
Measurements are made at 9:00 a.m. local time.

After weakening to a tropical low, Nora became slow moving over south-central Far North Queensland for about two days. During this time, tropical moisture from Nora and an associated monsoon trough caused very heavy to extreme rainfall throughout the region. The BOM issued a flood watch for all areas from Townsville to Cape Tribulation, and a severe weather warning for heavy rainfall for large parts of the region. In parts of east coast and Gulf of Carpentaria coast of Queensland, 24-hour rainfall totals of 50–100 mm (2.0–3.9 in) were widespread, and many areas received seven-day totals in excess of 400 mm (16 in). The most intense precipitation occurred at Port Douglas, where 593.0 mm (23.35 in) of rainfall was recorded in the 24 hours to 23:00 UTC on 25 March. The city of Cairns also received very heavy rainfall, leading to flash flooding. Cars were swept away by floodwaters, undercover car parks were inundated, and a shopping centre and hotel were flooded with ankle-deep water. Torrential rainfall caused landslides and knocked down trees, blocking the Captain Cook Highway north of the city. Two Cairns residents were nearly buried by a landslide while driving on the highway to Port Douglas. The Kuranda Range Road on the Kennedy Highway, located just northwest of Cairns, also had to be closed due to rockslides. More than 40 people had to be rescued by the QFES on the night of 26–27 March after floodwaters threatened the caravan parks where they were staying. Two people had to be rescued by the State Emergency Service (SES) after getting into danger by driving into floodwaters. In total, the SES responded to more than 100 calls for assistance from endangered residents, including at least 85 in Cairns and Port Douglas on 25 March. At least 10 tonnes (22,000 lb) of sand was distributed for use in sandbags to mitigate damage from approaching floodwaters.

The agriculture industry in the region also sustained damage from flooding caused by Nora. Crops of banana and sugar cane were affected, and fences, dams and other farm infrastructure were damaged. Livestock losses were also sustained. Many farmers had already been affected by the heavy rainfall and flooding in February and early March.

=== Northern Territory ===
Prior to developing into a tropical cyclone, areas in the northeastern Arnhem Land experienced thunderstorms and gusty winds. The airport on Groote Eylandt, located off the east coast of the Top End, recorded wind gusts of up to 78 km/h (48 mph) on 22 March. After strengthening into a Category 1 tropical cyclone, Nora produced a short period of sustained gale-force winds at Cape Wessel, north of the Gove Peninsula, peaking with a gust of 83 km/h (52 mph). Heavy rainfall also occurred, with 224.4 mm (8.83 in) of precipitation recorded at Cape Wessel and 159.9 mm (6.30 in) in Nhulunbuy from 20 to 24 March.

== Aftermath ==
Due to the flooding of many roads in and around Pormpuraaw and Kowanyama, as well as the number of trees and amount of vegetation strewn across the roads, the communities became inaccessible by land. The QFES urged residents to be careful when venturing outside, as the large number of power lines that had been knocked down posed a risk to safety. Power was restored to properties in Mapoon on the afternoon of 25 March after a repair crew was flown into the town. SES crews first arrived in Pormpuraaw on 26 March in order to assist with the cleanup operation. Ergon Energy used five aircraft to airlift repair crews, electrical generators, equipment and all-terrain vehicles from Cairns to the other towns that had suffered electricity cuts. Power was restored to the sewage treatment plant in Pormpuraaw by 26 March, and to all of the town's properties by 29 March.

After the adverse weather had cleared, local police officers in Kowanyama rounded up the livestock that had escaped their enclosures during the cyclone, including a bull and a horse. Additional police officers from Cairns were deployed to the worst-affected Far North Queensland communities during the two weeks following the cyclone to assist residents with clean up efforts. Queensland Premier Annastacia Palaszczuk, Minister for Fire and Emergency Services Craig Crawford, and local politician Cynthia Lui, also visited the townships on 28 March to assess the damage and support the local residents in their cleanup operation.

Relief funding from Queensland Government
Purpose	Funds	
Purpose	(AU$)	(US$)
Farmers and small businesses
Concessional loans	250,000	190,000
Working capital loans	250,000	190,000
Freight subsidies	5,000	3,800
Pormpuraaw, Kowanyama and Mapoon residents
Relief vouchers for families	5,300	4,000
Relief vouchers for single adults	1,765	1,345
Financial hardship payments	180	140

To assist in the recovery effort, the Queensland Government provided funding to residents and farmers who had been directly impacted by the event, as well as to local councils in the affected areas. A total of more than AU$200,000 (US$150,000) was distributed to residents in Pormpuraaw, Kowanyama and Mapoon. This money was able to be used for repairing essential household items such as refrigerators and washing machines, as well to assist those who had encountered financial hardship as a result of the cyclone to purchase food and clothing. Loans were also made available to owners of small businesses and farms that had been affected by flooding in several areas of Far North Queensland. Councils in a total of 14 local government areas were able to access disaster assistance money to repair damaged assets such as roads, and to aid in clean up efforts such as the removal of debris. These areas included Cairns, Carpentaria, Cook, Croydon, Douglas, Etheridge, Hinchinbrook and Lockhart River.

In June 2018, the Queensland Government announced that AU$6.5 million (US$5.0 million) would be spent on improving emergency services in Far North Queensland following Severe Tropical Cyclone Nora. Of these funds, AU$2.5 million (US$1.9 million) was committed to upgrading the QFES communications centre in Cairns. The remaining AU$4.0 million (US$3.1 million) would be provided for constructing and upgrading emergency services facilities in the Cape York Peninsula communities of Weipa and Horn Island. In September 2018, the Kowanyama Aboriginal Shire Council was given a grant of AU$1.1 million (US$840,000) in order to fund economic growth and jobs in the region, to establish a new road and construction unit, and to improve the area's disaster recovery capabilities.

== See also ==
- Weather of 2017 and 2018
- Tropical cyclones in 2017 and 2018
- Tropical Cyclone Sadie (1994)—followed a very similar track to Nora
- Severe Tropical Cyclone Abigail (2001)—the last storm to make landfall on Queensland's Gulf of Carpentaria coast as a severe tropical cyclone
- Severe Tropical Cyclone Nathan (2015)—passed north of Pormpuraaw at Category 1 intensity after making landfall at Category 4
- Severe Tropical Cyclone Marcus (2018)—the most powerful tropical cyclone in the Australian region in more than a decade, and aided in formation by the Rossby wave which later contributed to Nora's development
- Severe Tropical Cyclone Owen (2018)—affected Cape York Peninsula nine months after Nora
- Tropical Cyclone Penny (2019)—affected Cape York Peninsula nine months after Nora, and just after Owen
- Severe Tropical Cyclone Trevor (2019)—affected Cape York Peninsula one year after Nora
