= Cyclone Tiffany =

Category 2 Australian region tropical cyclone in 2022

Tropical Cyclone Tiffany
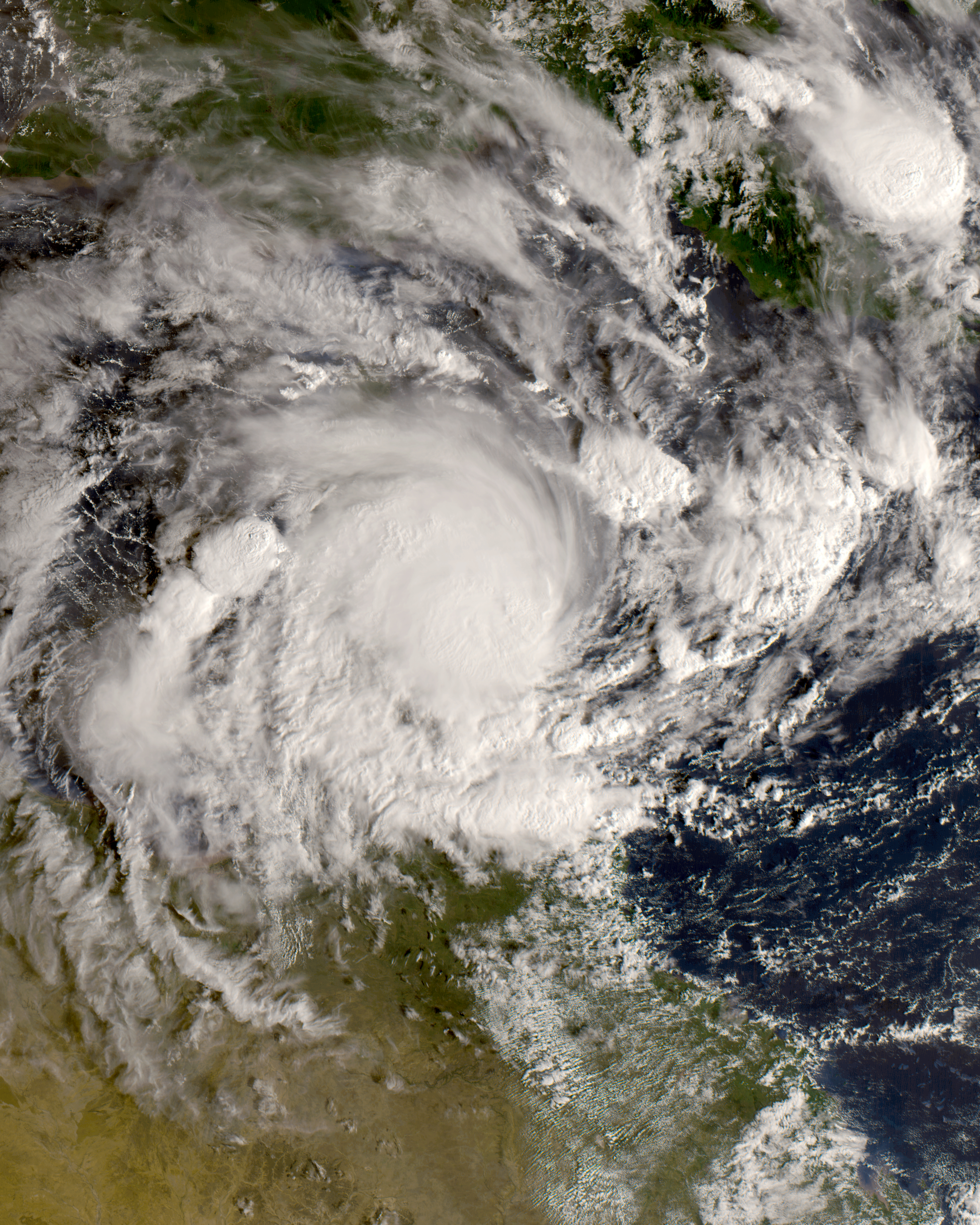
- Cyclone Tiffany at peak intensity before landfall in the Cape York Peninsula on 9 January

Meteorological history
- Formed: 8 January 2022
- Remnant low: 12 January 2022
- Dissipated: 17 January 2022

Category 2 tropical cyclone
- 10-minute sustained (BOM)
- Highest winds: 100 km/h (65 mph)
- Lowest pressure: 988 hPa (mbar); 29.18 inHg

Tropical storm
- 1-minute sustained (SSHWS/JTWC)
- Highest winds: 100 km/h (65 mph)

Overall effects
- Fatalities: 1
- Damage: $36,000 (2022 USD)
- Areas affected: Papua New Guinea, Queensland, Northern Territory, Western Australia
- Part of the 2021–22 Australian region cyclone season

Tropical Cyclone Tiffany was a strong tropical cyclone that made landfall in Queensland and the Northern Territory in Australia. The tenth tropical low and the fifth tropical cyclone of the 2021–22 Australian region cyclone season, Tiffany originated from a tropical low south of Papua New Guinea, before intensifying into a tropical cyclone and named Tiffany, peaking as a category 2 tropical cyclone before making landfall in northern Queensland.

Damage from Tiffany totaled at least A$50,000 (US$36,000), and 1 fatality was reported.

== Meteorological history ==
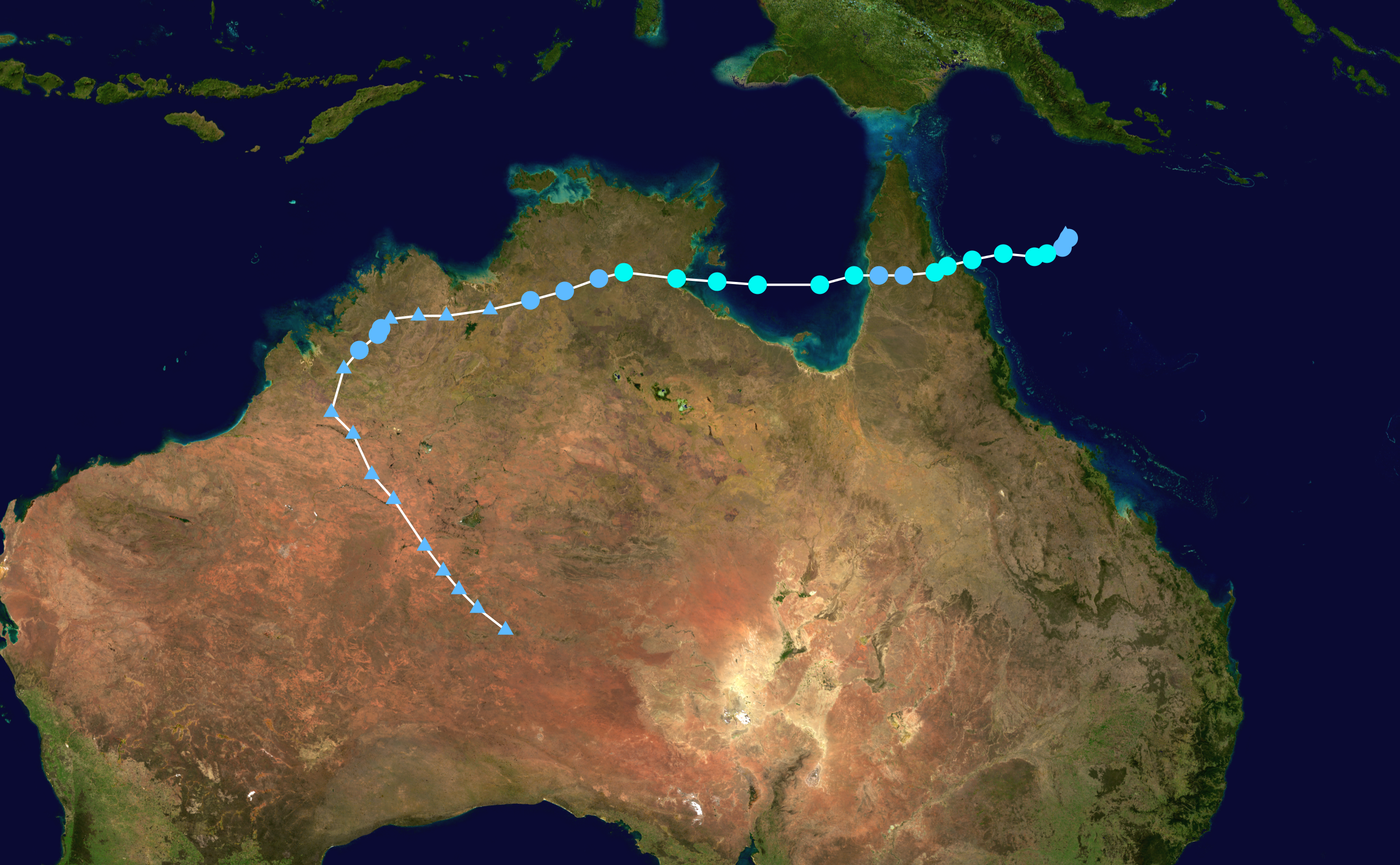
Map plotting the storm's track and intensity, according to the Saffir–Simpson scale Map key Saffir–Simpson scale Tropical depression (≤38 mph, ≤62 km/h) Tropical storm (39–73 mph, 63–118 km/h) Category 1 (74–95 mph, 119–153 km/h) Category 2 (96–110 mph, 154–177 km/h) Category 3 (111–129 mph, 178–208 km/h) Category 4 (130–156 mph, 209–251 km/h) Category 5 (≥157 mph, ≥252 km/h) Unknown Storm type Tropical cyclone Subtropical cyclone Extratropical cyclone, remnant low, tropical disturbance, or monsoon depression

On 4 January, the Bureau of Meteorology (BoM) began to monitor the northern Coral Sea for potential tropical cyclogenesis, as the monsoon trough was forecast to have renewed activity. Four days later, the BoM reported that a tropical low had formed, and designated it as 10U. At the same time, the Joint Typhoon Warning Center (JTWC) gave it a low chance of formation into a tropical cyclone within 24 hours, and the unofficial identifier Invest 90P. At the time, the low was located within a marginal environment for further development, with warm, 29–30 °C (84–86 °F) sea surface temperatures, moderate to high wind shear, and radial outflow aloft. Within the next 12 hours, the system's low-level circulation center began consolidating, along with deep convection persisting around it, prompting the JTWC to upgrade its chances of development into medium, before subsequently issuing a Tropical Cyclone Formation Alert (TCFA) at 23:30 UTC that same day, noting a small eye feature and improved curved banding on microwave imagery. At 06:00 UTC the next day, the BoM upgraded the tropical low into a category 1 tropical cyclone in the Australian scale, and named it Tiffany. The JTWC subsequently upgraded Tiffany into a tropical storm in the Saffir-Simpson scale three hours later, noting the rapid organization of the system in 12 hours. Moving west under a deep-layered subtropical ridge to its south, Tiffany went on a rapid intensification phase, with the BoM upgrading the storm to a Category 2 tropical cyclone six hours later. Tiffany then peaked at 21:00 UTC that same day, with 10-minute sustained winds of 55 knots (102 km/h; 63 mph), and 1-minute sustained winds of 65 knots (120 km/h; 75 mph), becoming a category 1-equivalent cyclone on the Saffir-Simpson scale. Tiffany then rapidly weakened into a category 1 tropical cyclone due to wind shear as it moved over the Princess Charlotte Bay, before subsequently making landfall in the Cape York Peninsula at 06:00 UTC on 10 January. The JTWC downgraded the cyclone to a tropical storm three hours later. Tiffany then weakened into a tropical low as it traversed the peninsula, before emerging over the Gulf of Carpentaria on 11 January.

Upon entering the Gulf of Carpentaria, it started to restrengthen, under a favorable environment of moderate wind shear being offset by very warm, 30–31 °C (86–88 °F) sea surface temperatures, and strong outflow. At 12:00 UTC that same day, the BoM upgraded Tiffany back into a category 2 tropical cyclone, as the system continued to reintensify. Tiffany then reached its secondary peak intensity later that day, with 10-minute sustained winds of 50 knots (93 km/h; 58 mph), and 1-minute sustained winds of 55 knots (102 km/h; 63 mph). At 00:00 UTC (09:30 ACST) 12 January, Tiffany made its final landfall at Ngukurr in the Northern Territory. The JTWC subsequently issued their final advisory on the system three hours later. Tiffany then weakened into a remnant low and remained traceable overland as it moved west, reaching the Western Australia region on 13 January, before turning southeast in response to a mid-latitude trough moving from the west. It was last noted on 17 January, over central Australia.

== Preparations and impact ==
=== Papua New Guinea ===
No direct impacts on Papua New Guinea were reported, though 50–100 millimetres (2.0–3.9 in) of rainfall fell in the southern half of the country.

=== Australia ===
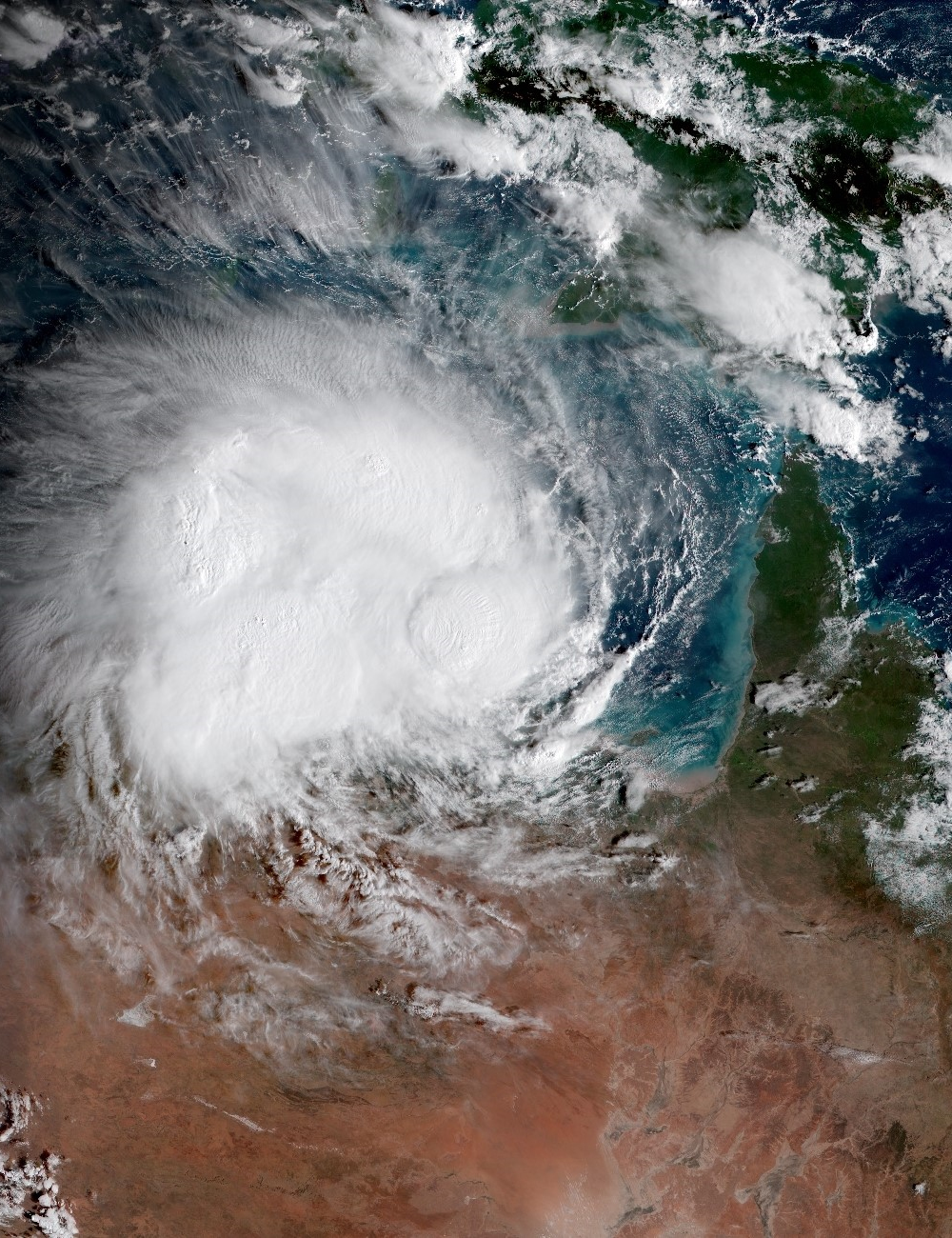
Tiffany nearing landfall over the Northern Territory at its secondary peak intensity late on 11 January

As the system was strengthening to the west of the Cape York Peninsula, cyclone warnings were issued over the region. Tiffany hit many areas still recovering from swells caused by Cyclone Seth. One person died in Queensland after floodwaters struck them, and another person is currently missing. Damage in the Cape York Peninsula was minimal, though many people were urged to hide in shelters or basements. Many people across Queensland, most in Cooktown, were urged to hide or evacuate. A levee failed, and floodwaters rushed into towns. Over 200mm of rain were dumped in many areas of Queensland within a 24-hour period. The highest rainfall total reported was in Whyanbeel Valley on 11 January, with 170.4 millimetres (6.71 in) of rain in a 24-hour period.

As Tiffany approached the Northern Territory, cyclone warnings were also issued in parts of the region. In Groote Eylandt, many areas saw power outages, though damage was generally minimal. In Top End, no major damage was reported, though fallen power lines and flooded roads were reported. One house in Katherine, Northern Territory saw over A$50,000 (US$36,000) in damage due to Tiffany, and a car was destroyed by flying branches. In Mataranka, Northern Territory, many trees were downed and flying debris and sticks were reported, causing minor damage to some houses. Katherine saw over 100 millimeters of rain in just 24 hours. The highest rainfall total reported in the region was in Maranboy Hill on 13 January, with 155.2 millimetres (6.11 in) of rain in a 24-hour period, and a 3-day period total of 264 millimetres (10.4 in).

Broome, Western Australia was battered by strong rain, winds, and hail, and many trees were uprooted. Damaging winds also struck Northern Kimberley. The highest rainfall total reported in the region was in Ellenbrae on 14 January, with 155.4 millimetres (6.12 in) of rain in a 24-hour period, and in Keep River with a 7-day period total of 275 millimetres (10.8 in).

== See also ==
- 2021–22 Australian region cyclone season
- Weather of 2022
- Tropical cyclones in 2022
- Tropical cyclones in Australia
- Cyclone Ingrid
