= Cyclone Ingrid =

2005 Australian region cyclone

Severe Tropical Cyclone Ingrid
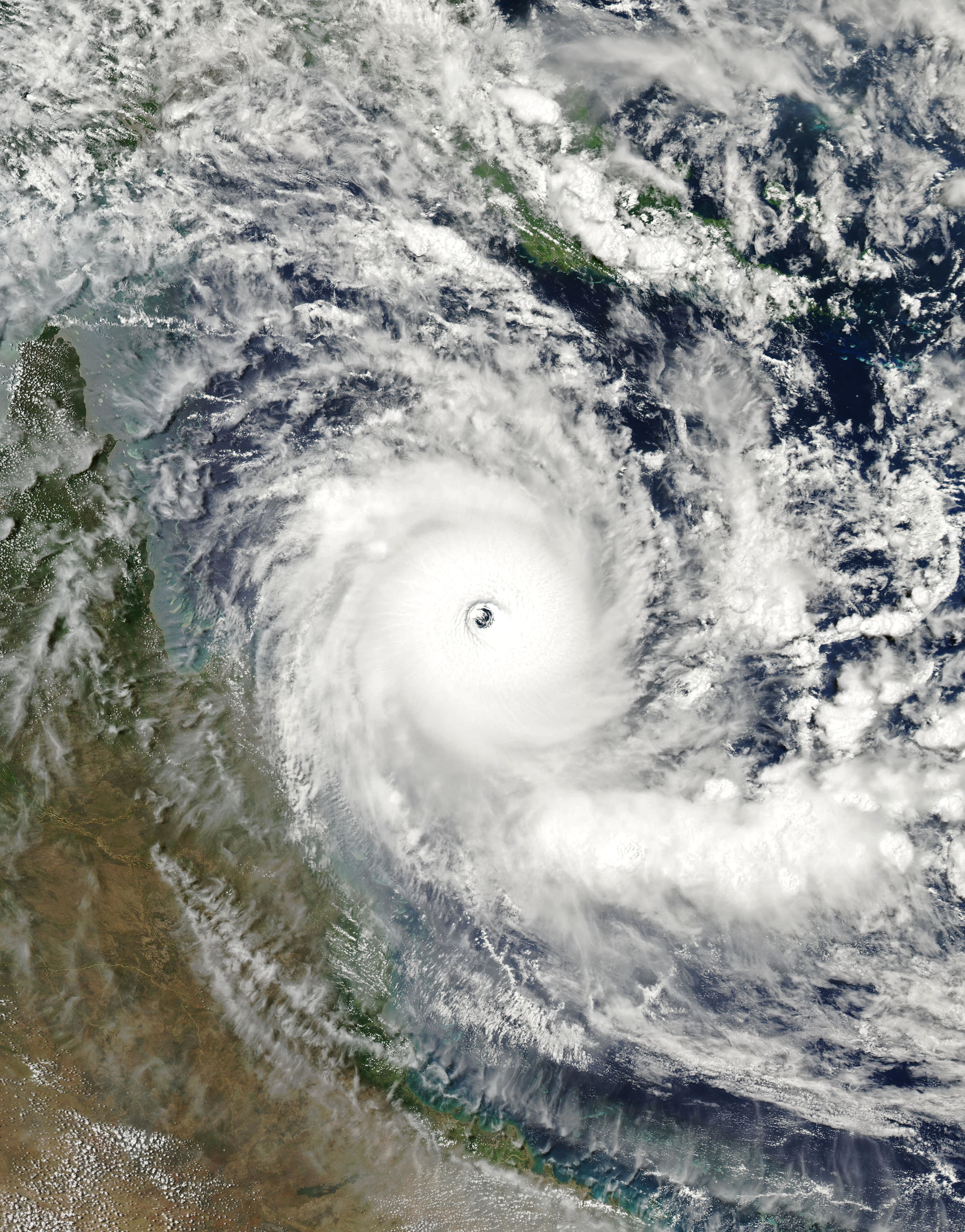
- Ingrid at its initial peak intensity approaching Queensland on 8 March

Meteorological history
- Formed: 4 March 2005
- Dissipated: 16 March 2005

Category 5 severe tropical cyclone
- 10-minute sustained (BOM)
- Highest winds: 230 km/h (145 mph)
- Lowest pressure: 924 hPa (mbar); 27.29 inHg

Category 4-equivalent tropical cyclone
- 1-minute sustained (SSHWS/JTWC)
- Highest winds: 250 km/h (155 mph)
- Lowest pressure: 904 hPa (mbar); 26.70 inHg

Overall effects
- Fatalities: 5+ direct
- Damage: $14.4 million (2005 USD)
- Areas affected: Papua New Guinea, Queensland, Northern Territory, Northern Western Australia
- IBTrACS
- Part of the 2004–05 Australian region cyclone season

Severe Tropical Cyclone Ingrid was a compact but very powerful tropical cyclone which struck northern Australia during March 2005. The 8th named storm and the 3rd severe tropical cyclone of the 2004-05 Australian region cyclone season. Ingrid developed from a low-pressure area located north of the Gulf of Carpentaria on 4 March. the low-pressure area further organized and on was upgraded to a tropical cyclone on 6 March, being assigned the name Ingrid. Its minimum pressure was 924 mbar (hPa).

Ingrid is one of two recorded tropical cyclones to strike three Australian states/territories (Queensland, Northern Territory and Western Australia) at severe tropical cyclone strength (category 3 or higher), with the other being Cyclone Narelle in 2026.

== Meteorological history ==
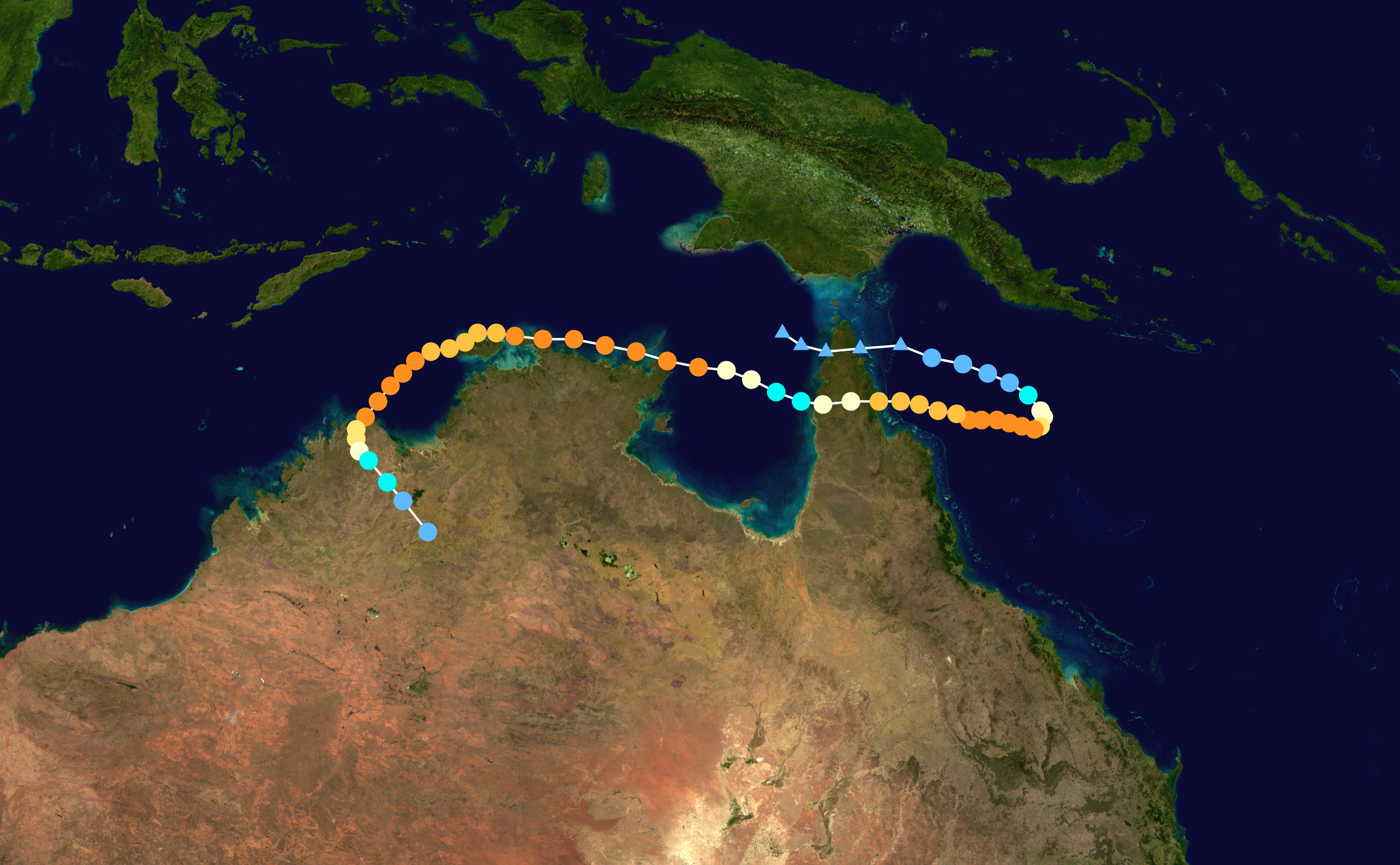
Map plotting the storm's track and intensity, according to the Saffir–Simpson scale Map key Saffir–Simpson scale Tropical depression (≤38 mph, ≤62 km/h) Tropical storm (39–73 mph, 63–118 km/h) Category 1 (74–95 mph, 119–153 km/h) Category 2 (96–110 mph, 154–177 km/h) Category 3 (111–129 mph, 178–208 km/h) Category 4 (130–156 mph, 209–251 km/h) Category 5 (≥157 mph, ≥252 km/h) Unknown Storm type Tropical cyclone Subtropical cyclone Extratropical cyclone, remnant low, tropical disturbance, or monsoon depression

Originally a low-pressure system north of the Gulf of Carpentaria, Ingrid moved eastward and developed into a tropical cyclone in the Coral Sea on 6 March 2005. A strong pressure gradient rapidly developed within the system as it headed west resulting in a category rating of 5 by 8 March. The eye, with very destructive wind gusts up to 220 km/h within a 20 km radius, reached the far northern coast of the Australian state of Queensland between 6 am and 9 am on 10 March 2005 AEST, and hit the Cape York Peninsula. However, it was downgraded to a Category 2 storm as it crossed the peninsula north of the towns of Coen and Lockhart River.

After passing the town of Weipa, Ingrid gained strength once again as it moved out across the Gulf of Carpentaria towards the Northern Territory. It struck the town of Nhulunbuy as a Category 5 storm. It crossed the Cobourg Peninsula in the early hours of 13 March, heading west. Ingrid struck the Tiwi Islands as a Category 4 storm, and moved west into the Timor Sea, being downgraded to a category 3 due to the passage over land. Winds were in excess of 200 km/h.

On 15 March Ingrid approached the north coast of the Kimberley region of Western Australia as a Category 4 storm, and made landfall near Kalumburu shortly afterwards. It quickly weakened as it moved inland, and soon completely dissipated.

(Note: The storm categories above are as defined by the Australian Bureau of Meteorology, and differ from those used in the United States.)

== Preparations ==
=== Queensland ===
In Far North Queensland, several hundred residents, including some in Aboriginal communities, evacuated from areas deemed vulnerable to shelters by 9 March. Tourists in resorts on Lizard Island and Cape Tribulation were evacuated the same day. Local communities throughout the coastline were supplied with sandbags and relief materials. To reduce damage from trees, workers cut numerous trees down ahead of the storm. Three Aboriginal communities, with a total population of 1,500, and nearby Cooktown, home to 2,000 people, were placed on standby for evacuation. In Cairns, emergency officials stockpiled sandbags and concerns were raised about 20% of the 130,000 people that live in the city never experiencing a cyclone within the past five years. In Lockhart River, an estimated 700 people evacuated to shelters prior to the storm. On the western coast of Queensland, residents took precautions prior to a weakened Ingrid as a "code blue alert" was declared.

=== Northern Territory ===
On 11 March, officials in the Northern Territory advised the 4,000 residents of Nhulunbuy to evacuate to higher ground. On Melville Island, 1,500 aborigines evacuated to shelter throughout the island. One of the most important local events, the Australian rules football final, was cancelled due to Ingrid. On Croker Island, 300 residents evacuated to cyclone shelters prior to the storm.

=== Western Australia ===
In Kalumburu, residents in the most vulnerable areas were evacuated to shelters.

== Impact ==
Ingrid is one of two recorded instances of a tropical cyclone to have struck three Australian states or territories while being at severe tropical cyclone strength, being Queensland at category 4 strength, between 3-5 at various impacts in the Northern Territory and its islands, and category 4 in Western Australia.

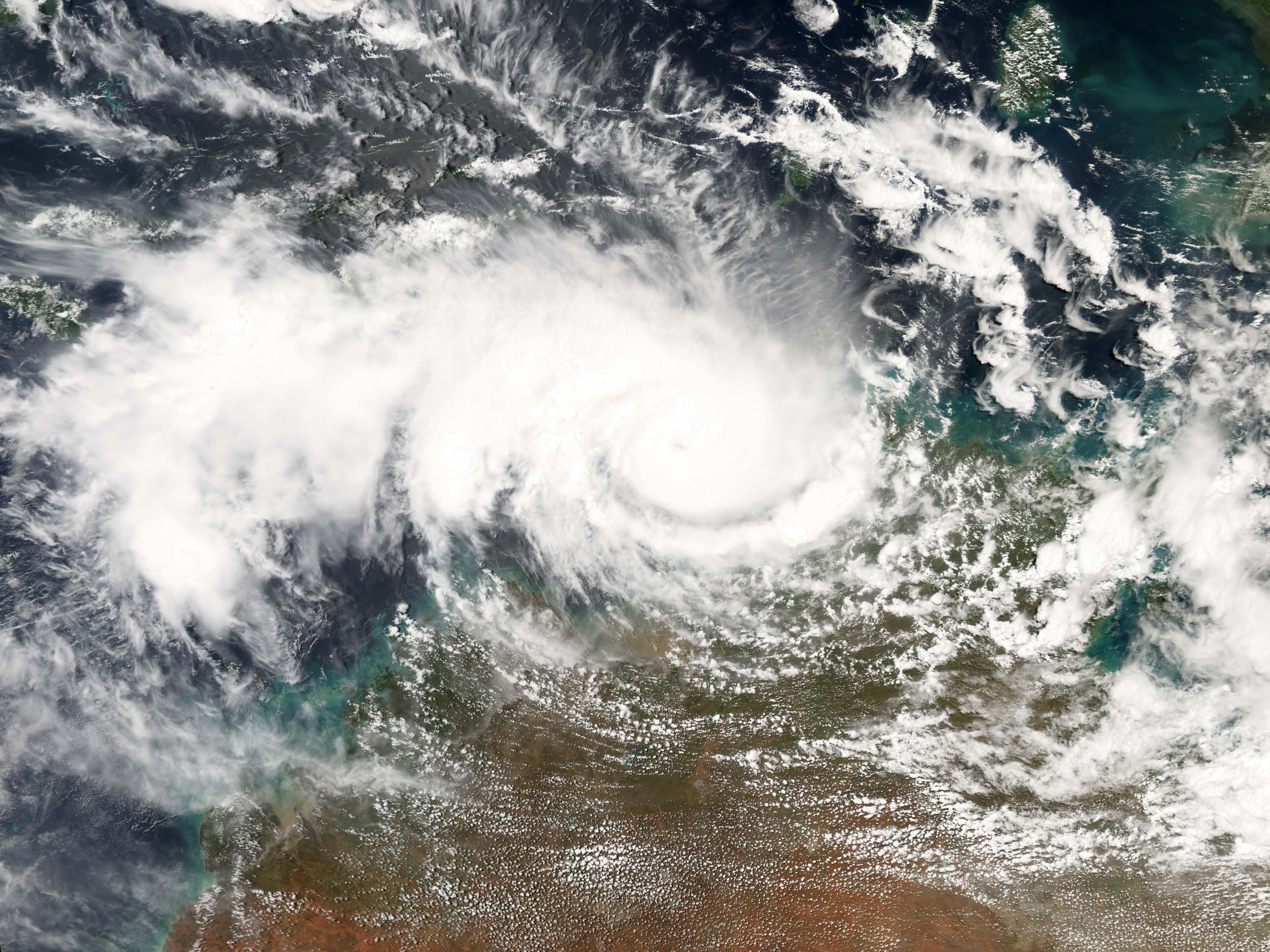
Cyclone Ingrid near Tiwi Islands on 14 March

=== Papua New Guinea ===
Rough seas produced by Cyclone Ingrid capsized a boat off the coast of Papua New Guinea, killing five of the 13 occupants. A village southeast of Port Moresby was significantly damaged following a large storm surge.

=== Queensland ===
Damages from the storm in Queensland amounted to A$5.3 million (US$4.1 million).

Ingrid was the most powerful tropical cyclone to cross the Great Barrier Reef since 1918. The cyclone impacted the far northern part of the reef, which had not experienced significant wind and wave events for decades. Major coral breakage and dislodgement were recorded along a narrow strip surrounding the path where winds were estimated to have exceeded 33 m/s (120 km/h; 74 mph). Minor damage was observed up to 160 km (99 mi) south of the cyclone's track.

=== Northern Territory ===
The isolated communities along the coast of Northern Territory suffered considerable damage, and there was localised flooding in the coastal areas due to high tides.

On Croker Island, 30 homes sustained damage, some of which lost their roofs, numerous trees were downed, power was cut to most residences, cars were completely destroyed and numerous roads were damaged. Nearly all trees on the island were leveled by 290 km/h (180 mph) wind gusts. Schools were reportedly destroyed in addition to several homes. Much of the infrastructure of the Tiwi Islands was affected, some suffering consequential damage due to trees falling on buildings and vehicles. Damages on the islands amounted to A$5 million (US$3.9 million). Throughout the Northern Territory, an additional A$10 million (US$6.4 million) in damages resulted from Ingrid.

On Nhulunbuy, damage was limited, with only fallen trees, power lines being reported along with no injuries.

Darwin experienced high winds and heavy rain, but was only affected by the southern edge of the cyclone.

=== Western Australia ===
The Great Northern Highway was closed between Kununurra and Halls Creek for a period of 36 hours due to flooding.

A resort area, known as "Faraway Bay", northeast of Kalumburu was completely destroyed by the storm. Numerous boats were found 100 m (330 ft) inland after being washed away by the storm surge. Numerous homes lost power and water supply, some sustained major roof damage and severe flooding isolated a few communities. Large areas of forested area were completely destroyed by Ingrid.

== See also ==
- Tropical cyclones in 2005
- Cyclone Tiffany
