= Croker Island =

Island of the Northern Territory, Australia

Native name: Margo
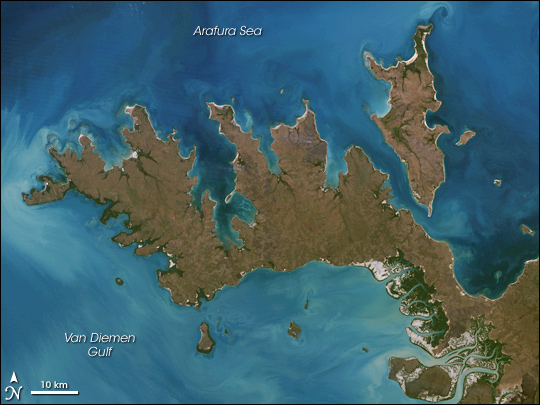
- Image of Croker Island with Cobourg Peninsula

- Location within Australia

Geography
- Location: Arafura Sea
- Coordinates: 11°08′S 132°33′E
- Major islands: Croker, Darch, Templer
- Area: 331.5 km^{2} (128.0 sq mi)
- Length: 43 km (26.7 mi)
- Width: 15 km (9.3 mi)
- Highest elevation: 15 m (49 ft)

Administration
- Australia
- Territory: Northern Territory
- Shire: West Arnhem Region
- Ward: Barrah Ward
- Largest settlement: Minjilang (pop. 271)

Demographics
- Population: 300
- Pop. density: 0.9/km^{2} (2.3/sq mi)

Croker Island is an island in the Arafura Sea off the coast of the Northern Territory, Australia, 250 km (160 mi) northeast of Darwin. It was the site of the Croker Island Mission between 1940 and 1968.

== Indigenous peoples ==
At the earliest time of European contact, the Indigenous people of Croker Island were the Jaako, an Aboriginal Australian people who spoke Marrgu, a language isolate. The modern Indigenous communities speak Iwaidja (the approximately 150 speakers being the last remaining speakers of the language) and Maung, Kunwinjku and English.

== Post-contact history ==
=== Macassan trepang fishing fleets ===
From around the 1600s, fleets of Macassan fishermen from the Dutch East Indies came to the region every year from January to April to harvest trepang or sea cucumber for the Chinese market. Their interactions with the local Indigenous people was at times violent but trade and employment opportunities also existed between the two groups.

=== Exploration by the British ===
Croker Island was charted by the British naval surveyor, Phillip Parker King, in 1818. He named it after the Secretary to the Admiralty, John Wilson Croker.

=== British trepang stations ===
British trepangers started coming to the island in 1877 with Captain Francis Cadell harvesting sea-cucumbers using Aboriginal labour. However, his stay was brief as he also blackbirded around 40 Indigenous people from the region to labour on his pearling boats in the Torres Strait.

In 1878, Edward Robinson and Thomas Wingfield established a permanent trepang station at Walka on the western coast of the island. They also utilised local Aboriginal labour and were known for their harsh treatment of their workers who they paid only with alcohol and tobacco. After Wingfield shot an Aboriginal man dead, retribution was swiftly achieved with a local strongman named Wandi Wandi killing Wingfield the same day.

This dissuaded any further permanent colonisation of the island until the 1920s and 1930s when L.A. Buckingham established a trepang station and peanut farm, but this enterprise had shut down by the start of World War II.

=== Croker Island Mission (1940 -1968) ===
Between 1940 and 1968, the Methodist Overseas Mission operated the Croker Island Mission at Minjilang. Many Aboriginal children were forcibly removed from their families by the church, part of what is now termed the Stolen Generation. The mission ran a school, and employed several of the male residents who had finished school.

The Pacific theatre of World War II saw the Japanese military aerial bombing Darwin in February 1942. Non-Indigenous children from the island were evacuated. To avoid the bombing, missionary Margaret Somerville led 95 Indigenous children from the island's orphanage, part of the Croker Island Mission, on a journey that saw the party arrive on the Australian mainland. Travelling a distance overland, they boarded a train through central Australia, arriving in Sydney, New South Wales, on the east coast. Over 44 days, the group covered 5,000 miles (8,000 km). The children returned to Croker Island in 1946. This expedition was described by Somerville in her book They crossed a continent, and later explored in the ABC documentary Croker Island Exodus (2012), directed and co-written by Steven McGregor and co-written by Danielle MacLean. Locals were cast to play all of the roles.

A class action was undertaken by 12 claimants against the Uniting Church in Australia for sexual and physical abuse which took place at the mission from the 1940s until the late 1960s. They finally received compensation in May 2023, through a private settlement.

=== 2001: Croker Island native title claim ===
The traditional custodians of Croker Island filed a claim over the sea surrounding Croker Island in 2001. The case, Yarmirr v Northern Territory (named after the lead claimant, Mary Yarmirr), was settled in the High Court of Australia on 11 October 2001. The clans represented were the Mandilarri-Ildugij, Mangalara, Murran, Gadura-Minaga and Ngaynjaharr clans. The case established that the traditional owners do have native title of the sea and sea-bed; however, common law rights of fishing and navigation mean that only non-exclusive native title can exist over the sea.

=== 2005: Cyclone Ingrid ===
Croker Island was severely damaged by Cyclone Ingrid in March 2005.

== Geography ==
Croker Island, which lies about 250 km (160 mi) northeast of Darwin, is separated from Cobourg Peninsula in the west by Bowen Strait, which is 2.5 km (1.6 mi) wide in the south and up to 7 km (4.3 mi) in the north, and 8.5 km (5.3 mi) long. In the north and east is the Arafura Sea, and in the south and southeast Mountnorris Bay. Croker Island measures 43 km (27 mi) from Point David (south, local name Inngirnatj) to Cape Croker (north), up to 15 km (9.3 mi) wide, and has an area of 331.5 km^{2} (128.0 sq mi) . At its highest point it is only 15 m (49 ft) above sea level. Croker Island is the largest island, and the only permanently inhabited island, in the Croker Group.

=== Settlements ===
The only notable settlement on Croker Island is the Aboriginal community of Minjilang, located on Mission Bay on the east coast. Apart from that, there are nine small family outstations, the largest one of which is Inngirnatj (Point David) at the southern end of the island. The settlements from north to south:

- Alamirra (close to Somerville Bay 1.5 km further the north)
- Timor Springs (north of Minjilang, 8 km by road)
- Wanakutja (on Palm Bay in the north-west)
- Minjilang (Mission Bay), the only village and main settlement of the island
- Adjamarrago (800 metres north of Croker Island Aerodrome, west of Minjilang)
- Keith William's Outstation (Arrgamumu, Arrgamurrmur) (south-east of Mission Bay)
- Walka (Barge Landing) (south side of Mission Bay, with barge pier)
- Sandy Bay (close to Sandy Bay on the east coast, but two kilometres to the coast)
- Marramarrani (southwest coast)
- Inngirnatj (Point David) (southern end, west side, with boat pier)

=== Environment ===
The island's beaches, bushland, wetlands and swamps are host to plentiful wildlife and flora.

A cull of feral horses was undertaken in 2015.

== Geography ==
=== Climate ===
Croker Island has a tropical savanna climate (Köppen: Aw) with a wet season from November to April and a dry season from May to October. The following climate data was taken from the airport. Extreme temperatures ranged from 37.3 °C (99.1 °F) on 2 November 2020 to 14.9 °C (58.8 °F) on 11 August 2025. The wettest recorded day was 21 November 2025 with 188.6 mm (7.43 in) of rainfall.

Climate data for Croker Island Airport (11.16°S 132.48°E) (9 m (30 ft) AMSL) (2012-2025)
Month	Jan	Feb	Mar	Apr	May	Jun	Jul	Aug	Sep	Oct	Nov	Dec	Year
Record high °C (°F)	36.1 (97.0)	34.2 (93.6)	35.3 (95.5)	35.0 (95.0)	34.7 (94.5)	33.7 (92.7)	33.4 (92.1)	34.8 (94.6)	36.8 (98.2)	37.2 (99.0)	37.3 (99.1)	36.5 (97.7)	37.3 (99.1)
Mean daily maximum °C (°F)	31.9 (89.4)	31.5 (88.7)	32.0 (89.6)	32.3 (90.1)	31.5 (88.7)	30.4 (86.7)	30.2 (86.4)	31.2 (88.2)	32.6 (90.7)	33.8 (92.8)	34.3 (93.7)	33.5 (92.3)	32.1 (89.8)
Mean daily minimum °C (°F)	26.0 (78.8)	25.9 (78.6)	25.8 (78.4)	25.1 (77.2)	24.1 (75.4)	22.2 (72.0)	20.9 (69.6)	21.2 (70.2)	23.0 (73.4)	24.6 (76.3)	25.7 (78.3)	26.5 (79.7)	24.3 (75.7)
Record low °C (°F)	22.3 (72.1)	20.8 (69.4)	20.5 (68.9)	21.2 (70.2)	18.2 (64.8)	16.1 (61.0)	15.5 (59.9)	14.9 (58.8)	17.4 (63.3)	20.1 (68.2)	20.9 (69.6)	22.1 (71.8)	14.9 (58.8)
Average precipitation mm (inches)	334.9 (13.19)	274.4 (10.80)	269.6 (10.61)	153.6 (6.05)	9.5 (0.37)	3.7 (0.15)	0.3 (0.01)	0.3 (0.01)	1.9 (0.07)	9.5 (0.37)	82.0 (3.23)	200.0 (7.87)	1,323.5 (52.11)
Average precipitation days (≥ 0.2 mm)	19.8	18.0	19.0	13.0	5.2	2.1	0.4	0.5	0.7	1.8	7.2	13.1	100.8
Source: Bureau of Meteorology (2012-2025)
