= Cyclone Imogen =

Category 1 Australian region cyclone in 2021

Tropical Cyclone Imogen
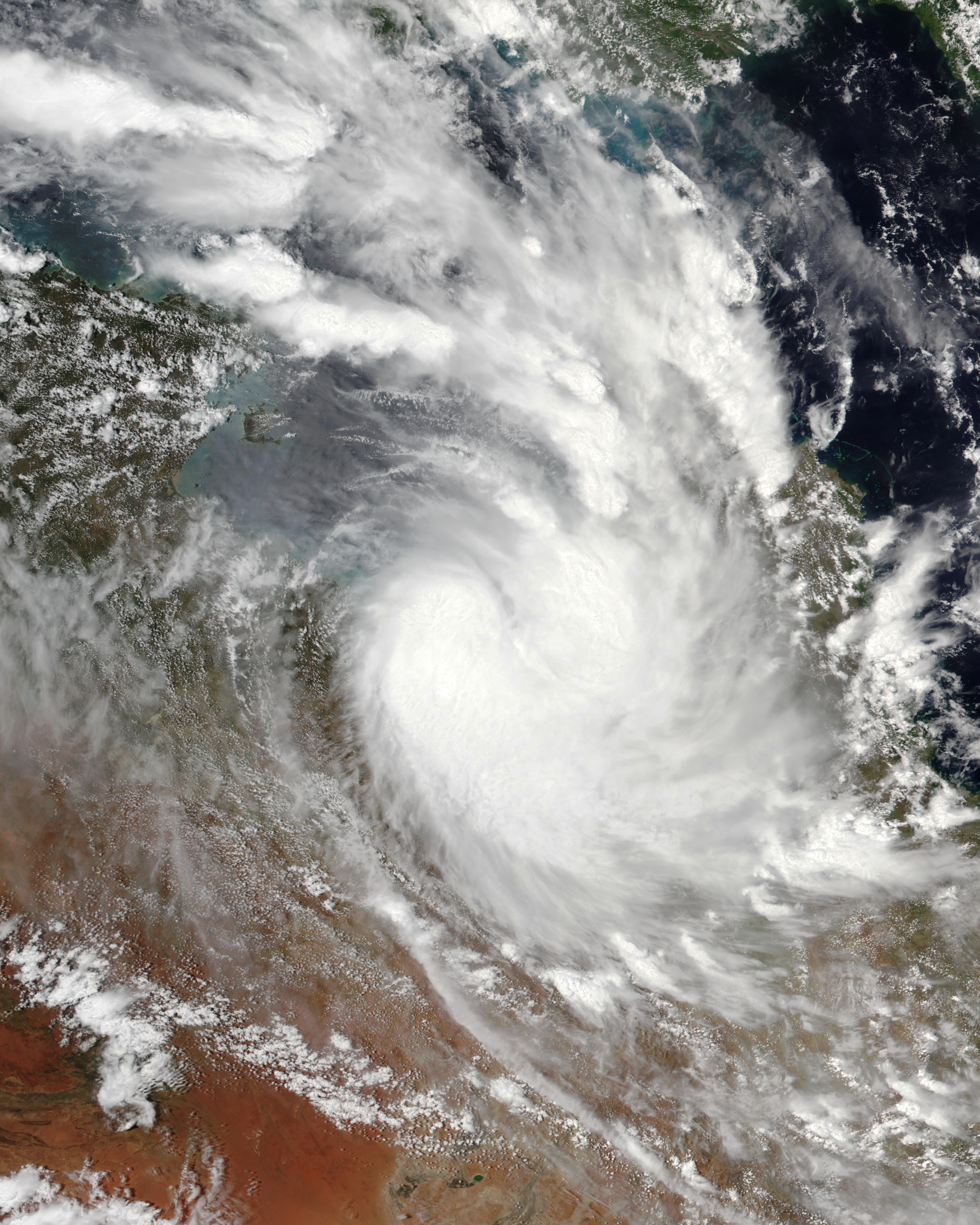
- Tropical Cyclone Imogen over the Gulf of Carpentaria, a few hours before landfall, on 3 January

Meteorological history
- Formed: 1 January 2021
- Dissipated: 6 January 2021

Category 2 tropical cyclone
- 10-minute sustained (BOM)
- Highest winds: 95 km/h (60 mph)
- Highest gusts: 130 km/h (80 mph)
- Lowest pressure: 985 hPa (mbar); 29.09 inHg

Tropical storm
- 1-minute sustained (SSHWS/JTWC)
- Highest winds: 85 km/h (50 mph)
- Lowest pressure: 995 hPa (mbar); 29.38 inHg

Overall effects
- Fatalities: None reported
- Damage: >$10 million (2021 USD)
- Areas affected: Northern Territory, Far North Queensland
- IBTrACS
- Part of the 2020–21 Australian region cyclone season

Tropical Cyclone Imogen was a weak but damaging tropical cyclone that affected parts of northern Queensland. The sixth tropical low, and the first cyclone of the 2020–21 Australian region cyclone season, Imogen originated from a tropical low that formed in the western Gulf of Carpentaria.

Imogen caused minimal destruction on the northern part of Queensland as a Category 2 cyclone, causing "Tens of millions" in damage.

== Meteorological history ==
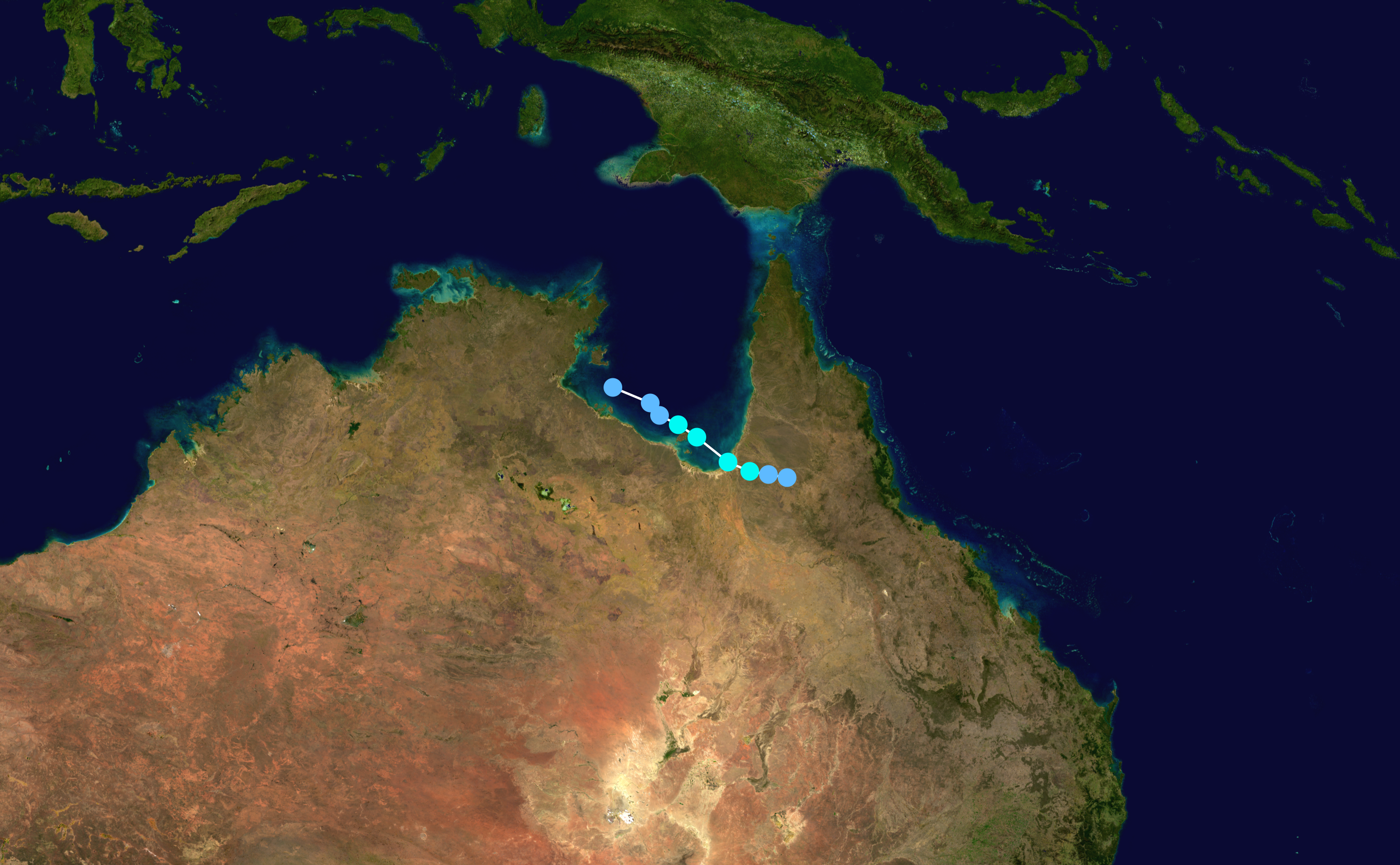
Map plotting the storm's track and intensity, according to the Saffir–Simpson scale Map key Saffir–Simpson scale Tropical depression (≤38 mph, ≤62 km/h) Tropical storm (39–73 mph, 63–118 km/h) Category 1 (74–95 mph, 119–153 km/h) Category 2 (96–110 mph, 154–177 km/h) Category 3 (111–129 mph, 178–208 km/h) Category 4 (130–156 mph, 209–251 km/h) Category 5 (≥157 mph, ≥252 km/h) Unknown Storm type Tropical cyclone Subtropical cyclone Extratropical cyclone, remnant low, tropical disturbance, or monsoon depression

On 1 January, the Bureau of Meteorology (BOM) reported that a tropical low had formed near Groote Eylandt in the western Gulf of Carpentaria, located about 635 km (395 mi) east-southeast of Darwin. The system was assigned the identifier code 05U by the BOM. Environmental conditions were assessed as being favourable for tropical cyclogenesis, characterised by very warm sea surface temperatures of up to 31 °C (88 °F), low to moderate vertical wind shear and an established poleward outflow channels in the upper levels. Flaring convection began to develop around the consolidating low-level circulation centre as the system tracked southeastward over the Gulf of Carpentaria, and at 00:00 UTC on 2 January, the BOM issued a tropical cyclone watch for parts of the northwestern Queensland coast. The tropical low continued to strengthen as convective rainbands began to wrap into the system's centre, with moist northwesterly cross-equatorial flow from over Indonesia feeding the system in the low to mid troposphere. By 18:00 UTC, vertical wind shear values had decreased further as the tropical low moved underneath an upper-level ridge; however, despite the highly favourable environmental conditions, intensification was limited somewhat by the broad and elongated nature of the low-level circulation center. The Joint Typhoon Warning Center (JTWC) issued a tropical cyclone formation alert for the system at 20:00 UTC.

Tropical Low 05U made landfall on the western coast of Mornington Island at around 02:00 UTC on 3 January, with maximum sustained winds near the centre of 55 km/h (34 mph). Intensification proceeded as the system re-emerged over the Gulf of Carpentaria a few hours later, with spiral rainbands continuing to develop around the centre of the system and deep convection becoming more concentrated. At 06:00 UTC, the tropical low was upgraded to a Category 1 tropical cyclone by the BOM, and was named Imogen, becoming the first tropical cyclone of the 2020–21 Australian region cyclone season. At the same time, the JTWC indicated that maximum one-minute sustained winds had increased to 65 km/h (40 mph), making Imogen equivalent to a tropical storm on the Saffir–Simpson hurricane wind scale. In combination with the low-level northwesterly flow, an upper-tropospheric trough situated to the south of the system began to gradually accelerate Imogen towards the southeast. Deep convection continued to concentrate over the centre of the cyclone; however, due to the system's proximity to land, limited time was available for further intensification. Tropical Cyclone Imogen made landfall just to the north of Karumba, Queensland, at 11:00 UTC on 3 January. At the time of landfall, maximum 10-minute sustained winds were estimated at 65 km/h (40 mph), with gusts to 100 km/h (62 mph) and a minimum atmospheric pressure of 994 hPa (29.35 inHg). The JTWC reported that maximum one-minute sustained winds had reached 85 km/h (53 mph) by this time.

Despite the centre of the system tracking over land, Imogen maintained its organisation for several hours, assisted by the flat terrain that had been saturated by heavy rainfall generated by the cyclone. The BOM reported that maximum 10-minute sustained winds peaked at 85 km/h (53 mph), with gusts to 110 km/h (68 mph), at 15:00 UTC on 3 January—about four hours after landfall—as the cyclone was passing to the northeast of Normanton. At this time, the automatic weather station at the town's airport recorded a minimum atmospheric pressure of 989.3 hPa (29.21 inHg).

Imogen later accelerated North-East before finally dissipating on January 6.

== Preparations and impact ==
The BOM maintained cyclone warnings for the inland Gulf Country including Croydon due to Cyclone Imogen.

As Cyclone Imogen blasted portions of north-west Queensland, it left extensive damage behind. It brought extreme torrential rain, massive waves and massive high tides as it made landfall. A house in Queensland shaked nearly 5 hours due to the tropical cyclone. It dumped more than 200 millimetres of rain at many places and left 1400 without power. Normanton Airport recorded 186mm of rain in less than 3 hours. A resident in Karumba described it as if it was an earthquake. Most of the damage was limited to damages from flooding and several uprooted trees. In Victoria, extreme rain fell over Gippsland and flood warnings was in place. The cyclone caused at least $10 million of damages.

== See also ==
- Tropical cyclones in 2021
- Cyclone Damien
- Cyclone Ita
