= Minjilang =

- Town
- Coordinates: 11°08′54″S 132°34′38″E
- Country: Australia
- State: Northern Territory
- LGA: West Arnhem Region
- Location: 422 km (262 mi) NE of Darwin; 176 km (109 mi) N of Jabiru

Government
  - Territory electorate: Arafura
  - Federal division: Lingiari
- Elevation: 35 m (115 ft)

Population
  - Total: 271 (2006 census)
- Postcode: 0822
- Mean max temp: 30.3 °C (86.5 °F)
- Mean min temp: 23.8 °C (74.8 °F)
- Annual rainfall: 1,392.3 mm (54.81 in)

Minjilang, formerly Mission Bay, is the Aboriginal community located on Croker Island, some 235 km (146 mi) east northeast of Northern Territory's capital of Darwin. It is the only settlement of any size on Croker Island, which lies a few kilometres off the mainland.

== History ==
Croker Island Mission existed at Minjilang between 1940 and 1968, operated by the Methodist Overseas Mission.

== Geography ==
The community of Minjilang is on the opposite, eastern side of the island on Mission Bay, a secluded bay. Besides Minjilang, there are only eight small family outstations.

== Population ==
At the 2011 census, Minjilang had a population of 308 primarily Aboriginal people. About 150 speak Iwaidja and are the only speakers of this language, but English, Kunwinjku and Maung are also spoken. Approximately 48% of the population is unemployed.

Croker Island offered a safe haven to many children from the "Stolen Generation", the people who were affected by the policy of forceful removal of Indigenous children from their families. Croker is a so-called dry community, meaning no alcohol may be brought into the village, to prevent abuse. However, the controlled sale of kava is licensed.

== Climate ==
Minjilang has a tropical savannah climate (Aw) with oppressively hot weather year round. The rainy season typically run from December through April and is very rainy.

Climate data for Minjilang
Month	Jan	Feb	Mar	Apr	May	Jun	Jul	Aug	Sep	Oct	Nov	Dec	Year
Record high °C (°F)	37.5 (99.5)	34.5 (94.1)	34.7 (94.5)	41.4 (106.5)	33.1 (91.6)	33.8 (92.8)	31.4 (88.5)	31.7 (89.1)	36.0 (96.8)	35.8 (96.4)	36.8 (98.2)	38.4 (101.1)	41.4 (106.5)
Mean daily maximum °C (°F)	31.3 (88.3)	30.8 (87.4)	30.7 (87.3)	30.8 (87.4)	29.7 (85.5)	28.1 (82.6)	27.4 (81.3)	28.3 (82.9)	29.8 (85.6)	31.6 (88.9)	32.9 (91.2)	32.4 (90.3)	32.9 (91.2)
Mean daily minimum °C (°F)	24.5 (76.1)	24.5 (76.1)	24.2 (75.6)	24.1 (75.4)	23.9 (75.0)	22.3 (72.1)	21.8 (71.2)	22.3 (72.1)	23.4 (74.1)	24.5 (76.1)	25.1 (77.2)	25.2 (77.4)	23.8 (74.8)
Record low °C (°F)	20.1 (68.2)	19.5 (67.1)	19.9 (67.8)	16.9 (62.4)	14.0 (57.2)	15.5 (59.9)	15.2 (59.4)	16.5 (61.7)	17.9 (64.2)	20.0 (68.0)	17.0 (62.6)	20.5 (68.9)	14.0 (57.2)
Average rainfall mm (inches)	316.6 (12.46)	257.1 (10.12)	281.7 (11.09)	159.0 (6.26)	43.0 (1.69)	5.2 (0.20)	3.7 (0.15)	0.1 (0.00)	0.5 (0.02)	6.5 (0.26)	67.8 (2.67)	208.2 (8.20)	1,390.4 (54.74)
Average rainy days	16.9	16.8	16.5	11.7	4.7	1.2	0.9	0.2	0.3	1.0	4.9	11.5	86.6

== Services ==
Minjilang has a supermarket, school, clinic serviced by a nurse and health worker (a doctor visits each fortnight and the dentist comes periodically). West Arnhem Region provides a number of services, e.g. waste collection, power and water supply and sewerage, and maintenance of roads, the barge landing and community airstrip.

== Communications ==
Croker Island Airfield is located about 11 km west of Minjilang and immediately south of Adjamarrago, a small family outstation. An air service to Darwin is run on a daily basis (except Thursdays and Sundays) by Murin Airways. The haul to Darwin takes about an hour. The community barge service to Darwin by Perkins Shipping is a weekly affair. The island itself has only low-grade dirt roads. A permit from the Northern Land Council is needed for any visitors wishing to come to Croker Island, as it is restricted Aboriginal-owned land. The community receives one radio station as well as four television stations.
