= Cyclone Trevor =

Category 4 Australian region cyclone in 2019

Severe Tropical Cyclone Trevor
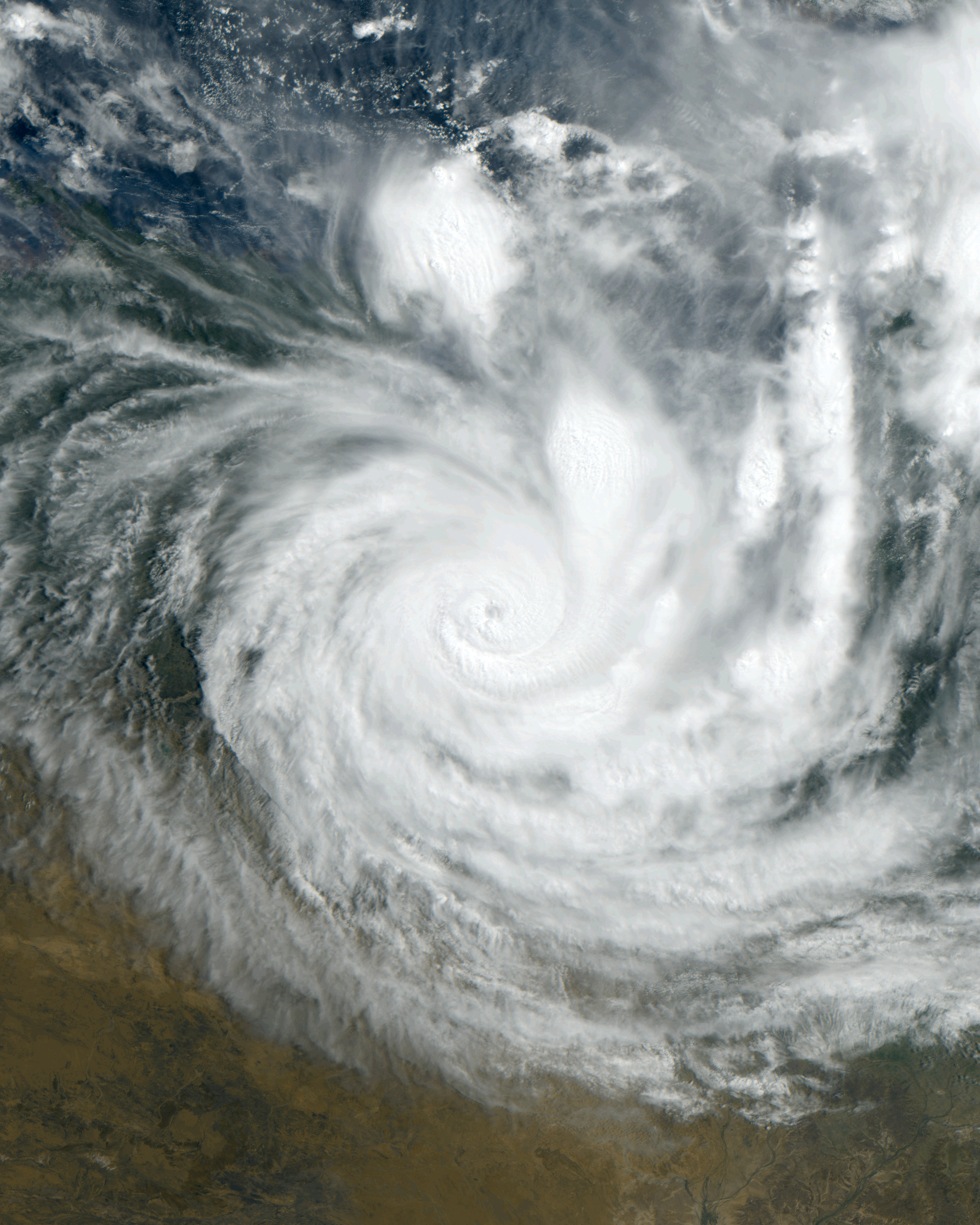
- Cyclone Trevor making landfall in Australia at peak intensity on 23 March

Meteorological history
- Formed: 15 March 2019
- Dissipated: 26 March 2019

Category 4 severe tropical cyclone
- 10-minute sustained (BOM)
- Highest winds: 175 km/h (110 mph)
- Lowest pressure: 950 hPa (mbar); 28.05 inHg

Category 3-equivalent tropical cyclone
- 1-minute sustained (SSHWS/JTWC)
- Highest winds: 195 km/h (120 mph)
- Lowest pressure: 948 hPa (mbar); 27.99 inHg

Overall effects
- Fatalities: None
- Damage: $700,000 (2019 USD)
- Areas affected: Indonesia, Papua New Guinea, Queensland, Northern Territory
- Part of the 2018–19 Australian region cyclone season

Severe Tropical Cyclone Trevor was a powerful and large tropical cyclone that caused major damages across Papua New Guinea, Northern Territory and Queensland during March 2019. The twentieth tropical low, seventh tropical cyclone, and fourth severe tropical cyclone of the 2018–19 Australian region cyclone season, Trevor originated from a tropical low that formed to the east of Papua New Guinea.

== Meteorological history ==
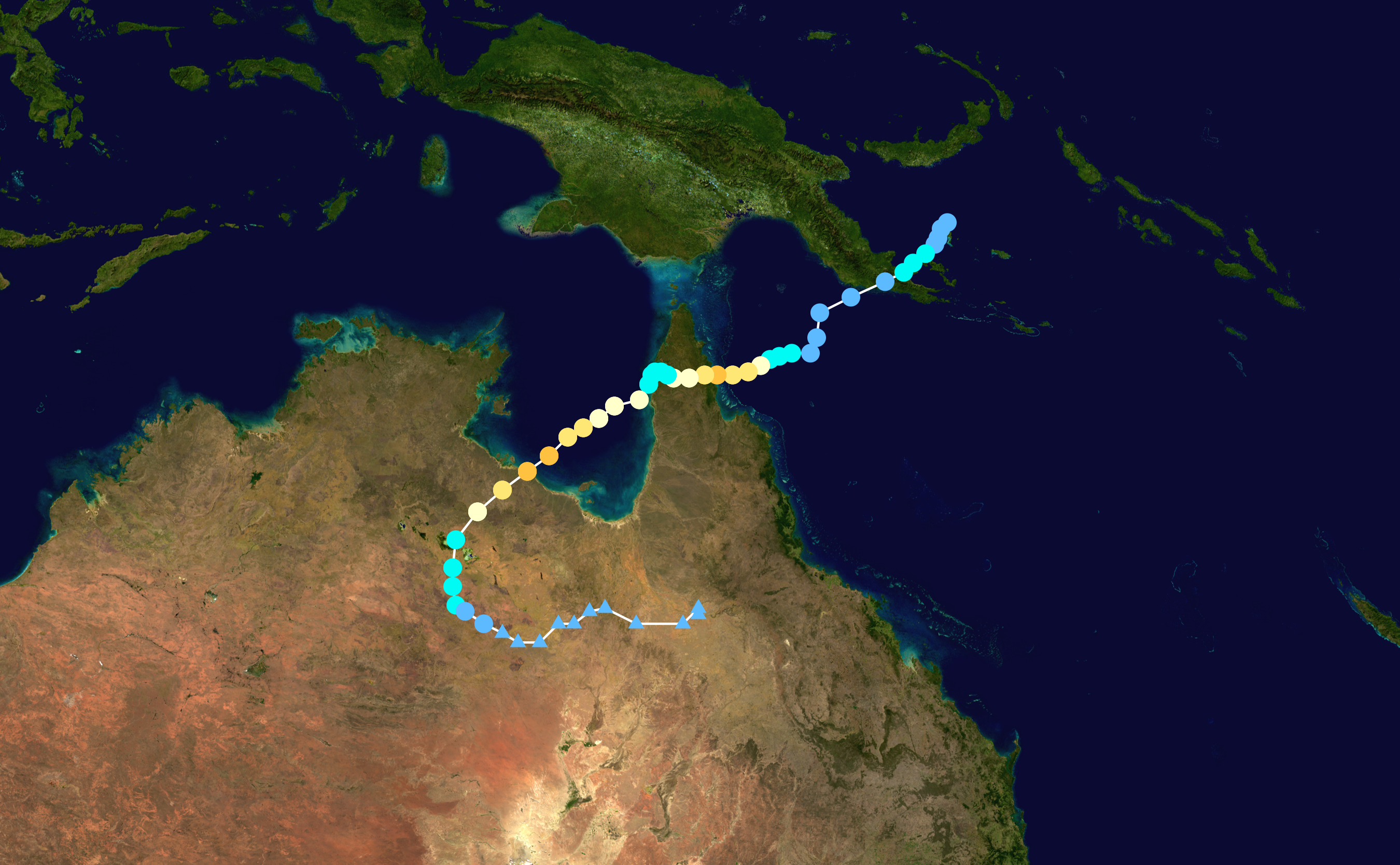
Map plotting the storm's track and intensity, according to the Saffir–Simpson scale Map key Saffir–Simpson scale Tropical depression (≤38 mph, ≤62 km/h) Tropical storm (39–73 mph, 63–118 km/h) Category 1 (74–95 mph, 119–153 km/h) Category 2 (96–110 mph, 154–177 km/h) Category 3 (111–129 mph, 178–208 km/h) Category 4 (130–156 mph, 209–251 km/h) Category 5 (≥157 mph, ≥252 km/h) Unknown Storm type Tropical cyclone Subtropical cyclone Extratropical cyclone, remnant low, tropical disturbance, or monsoon depression

A moderate to strong pulse of the Madden–Julian oscillation (MJO) moved into the Maritime Continent during March 2019. This aided the formation of a weak monsoonal trough to the north of Australia, which would help any tropical cyclone located in the area move southward toward the country. Although, the MJO soon weakened and no longer played an influence of tropical weather. This was due to other climate influences overshadowing the weakening MJO. Global forecasting models came into agreement that the MJO would continue to no longer be discernible over Trevor's lifespan.

On 11 March, the Bureau of Meteorology (BOM) noted that a tropical low had formed over the Solomon Sea near Papua New Guinea. The Joint Typhoon Warning Center (JTWC) first issued a Tropical Cyclone Formation Alert (TCFA) at 1:30 UTC on 15 March, while the disturbance was located roughly 430 kilometres (270 mi) east-northeast of Port Moresby, Papua New Guinea. The agency noted that the system was growing a tightening low-level center and deep convection. Within an area of moderate vertical wind shear and warm sea surface temperatures, the low began to strengthen.

== Preparations and impact ==
=== New Guinea ===
In Papua New Guinea, a strong wind warning was put in effect for coastal areas between the Gulf of Papua and the Torres Strait. Due to the wet weather Trevor brought to Port Moresby, the first day of the 2018–19 ICC T20 World Cup East Asia-Pacific Qualifier had to be delayed.

Trevor caused destruction across Goodenough Island. 591 residences were partially damaged, while 463 residences were fully damaged. A primary school was damaged by high winds, forcing classes to be cancelled for several weeks. On the island, 20% of gardens growing food were damaged by Trevor. The staff houses at a clinic in Yauyaula were mangled. In Kilia Ward, a church was destroyed by powerful winds. Fish ponds on the island were demolished by the cyclone.

=== Australia ===
Bureau of Meteorology, Australia
(@BOM_au)
tweeted:

Not since Marcia/Lam in 2015 have we had 2 severe cyclones in the Aus region at the same time! #CycloneVeronica in northwest WA is currently Category 4 strength, while #CycloneTrevor in the Gulf of Carpentaria is also likely to intensify to Cat 4 today.

22 Mar 2019

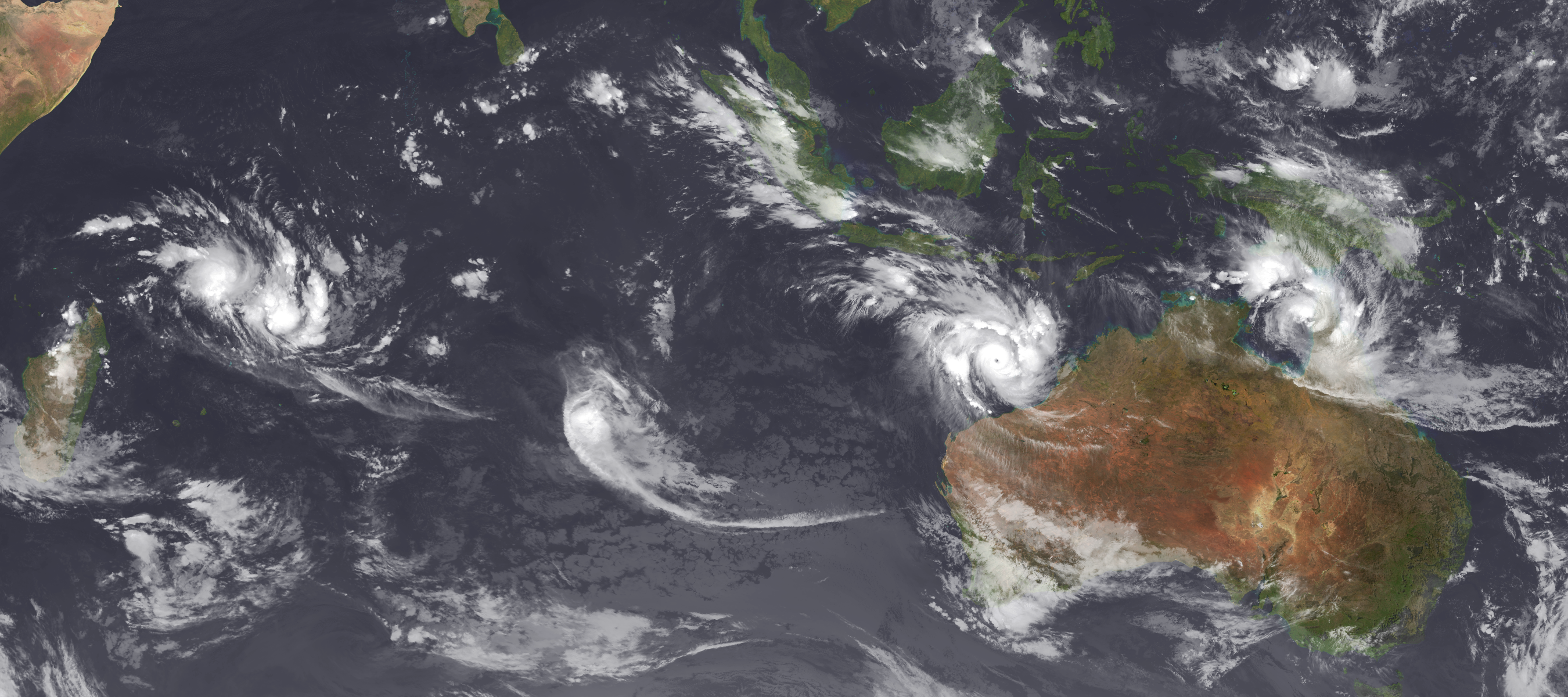
Cyclones Joaninha, Savannah, Veronica, and Trevor (from left to right) all active simultaneously on 21 March

As a precaution, roughly 1,400 people were forced to evacuate to shelters in rural parts of the Northern Territory. This was the largest evacuation in the area since Cyclone Tracy in 1974. A state of emergency was issued for the territory on 21 March. The Carpentaria Highway, Roper Highway, Barkly Stock Route, and the Tablelands Highways were shut down.

As the storm made landfall on the Cape York Peninsula, the entire town of Coen lost electricity while nearby Aurukun reported isolated power outages. The Iron Range National Park received extensive damage from the storm with numerous trees being flattened.

== Retirement ==
Due to the impact in Northern Queensland caused by the storm, the name Trevor was retired and will never be used again for an Australian region tropical cyclone. It will be replaced by Trung upon the next list repeat.

== See also ==
- Tropical cyclones in 2019
- Weather of 2019
- Cyclone Veronica – Another cyclone that formed around the same time as Trevor made landfall, and reached a similar intensity
- Cyclones Lam and Marcia (2015) – the first tropical cyclones to threaten Australia at the same time
