= Oitbi =

Indigenous Australian people

The Oitbi were an indigenous Australian people of the Cobourg Peninsula of the Northern Territory.

== Language ==
A short word-list of Oitbi vocabulary was obtained by Paul Foelsche, and included in the compilation of Australian tribes composed by Edward Micklethwaite Curr in 1886-1887. Foelsche recorded this as the language of the people of Raffles Bay, (Note: Foelsche identified this tribe as the Unalla, specifying that their land extended from Raffles Bay to Port Essengton, then further up the Colbourg Peninsula as far as Popham Bay.) but Tindale identified it as coming from a remnant of the Oitbi community. It is one of the Iwaidjan languages. The name "Oitbi" might have been a mishearing of warrkbi, the Iwaidja word for 'person', but Tindale lists the Oitbi word for 'no' as auitbi, seeming to show its being named after its word for 'no', in accordance with many Western Australian languages.

== Country ==
Norman Tindale estimated that the Oitbi's traditional lands extended over some 300 sq.miles, from the southern coast of the Cobourg Peninsula to the Sir George Hope Islands.

== People ==
The explorer George Windsor Earl who wrote one of the earliest records of the Oitbi, comparing them favourably with the Jaako, comes from the voyager George Windsor Earl remarked on what he perceived to be a Polynesian component in the makeup of the Oitbi:

Arched eyebrows, straight silky hair, and complexions fairer than those of the Australian aborigines generally, were by no means uncommon and many individuals possessed, in a considerable degree, that obliquity in the position of the eyes, which is considered as being characteristic of some of the Polynesian tribes. These appearances were even more developed in the people from the mountain ranges who occasionally visited us. Upon the whole, I am very much inclined to suppose that there has been some infusion of the Polynesian blood among the aborigines of this part of the continent.

== History ==
The Oitbi probably experienced considerable interaction with the Makassans during their annual trading ventures around the waters of northern Australia. One indication of their presence among the Oitbi is one of their ethnonyms, Bidjenelumbo, which appears to be of Malayan origin.

They suffered, like many of the aboriginal people of this area, a rapid phase of tribal disaggregation with the onset of European colonization, perhaps due also to the pressure of tribes on their south eastern flank driving them into the peninsula. In addition, if Tindale was correct in interpreting the language obtained by Paul Foelsche, the Inspector of Police at Port Darwin, from the 'Unalla' as being that of the Oitbi, then Foelsche states that by 1881, their numbers were down to 30: 7 men, 12 women, 9 boys and 2 girls. The drastic reduction from a once numerous tribe was attributed to the effects of smallpox introduced by Makassar trepangers in 1866, which decimated the tribe. Many of the tribes appear to have melted into the Iwaidja.

In addition to the Oitbi there were five other tribes who managed to maintain memories of their independent tribal identities in the early period of European settlement: Wurango, Jaako, Iwaidja, Amarak, Djalakuru. The Gaari, a seventh tribe, became extinct.

== Alternative names ==
- Heutbi (oitbi/auitbi is their word for 'no.')
- Oitbo
- Bidjenelumbo, Bijnalumbo

== Some words ==
- looloot (tame dog)
- lurkakie (wild dog)
- nowajuk (father)
- kamoomoo (mother)
- warrooline (children)
- warrangganaba (white man)

== Sources ==
- Earl, G. Windsor (1846). "On the Aboriginal Tribes of the Northern Coast of Australia". The Journal of the Royal Geographical Society of London. 16: 239–251. doi:10.2307/1798232. JSTOR 1798232.
- Eylmann, Erhard (1908). Die Eingeborenen der Kolonie Südaustralien (PDF). Berlin: D. Reimer. pp. 270–271.
- Foelsche, Paul (1886). "Raffles Bay Tribe" (PDF). In Curr, Edward Micklethwaite (ed.). The Australian race: its origin, languages, customs, place of landing in Australia and the routes by which it spread itself over the continent. Vol. 1. Melbourne: J. Ferres. pp. 270–275.
- Tindale, Norman Barnett (1974). "Oitbi (NT)". Aboriginal Tribes of Australia: Their Terrain, Environmental Controls, Distribution, Limits, and Proper Names. Australian National University. ISBN 978-0-708-10741-6.
