= Mamitpa =

Indigenous Australian boatman (1860s–1931)

Mamitpa or Mamidpa or Tim Finnigan (c. late 1860s – September 1931) was an Iwaidja man who worked as a trepanger and boatman in the north west section of Arnhem Land in the Northern Territory of Australia.

== Biography ==
Mamitpa was born on or near the Cobourg Peninsula in around the 1860s and he was a part of the Murran clan with his land being the Marraya and his skin group Yarriyarnim. His first language was Yiwaidja although he also spoke other languages from the Arnhem Land. He also spoke English and the language of the Makassar people due to the trade that he, and his people, had with them.

Mamitpa is believed to have travelled to Makassar on a proa on multiple occasions in his youth and, in the 1870s, first came in contact with 'white' men and the Port Essington and Raffles Bay settlements. From the 1880s he, alongside many of his people, began working at a sugar plantation (Delissaville Pioneer Sugar Company) at Delissaville, now Belyuen, which was managed by Charles Levi. This venture faced many issues and was short-lived (see: Bean Brothers for more information).

After the failure of the sugar plantation Mamitpa began working for EO Robinson in various capacities including as a sailor on his boats Bertie and Essington; he also collected duties from visiting Macassans and others involved in trepanging. When Robinson left the region in 1899 he is said to have sent his Mamitpa tobacco, tea and sugar every Christmas until he died in 1917.

Alfred Searcy also knew Mamitpa well and wrote about his in his books; in By flood and field (1912) Searcy stated that he was "tremendously taken with him". He praised Mamitpa, whom he recorded as Tim Finnigan, for his excellent knowledge of English and as an expert boatman.

From approximately 1887 to 1980, Mamitpa worked for the trepanger Rodney Claude Spencer and, in April 1890, was working for him when Spencer murdered Mamialucum who he accused of stealing rice. Following this event he was a witness at Spencer's trial where he was found guilty; at the trial Spencer accused Mamitpa as having been involved but the court did not agree. Spencer was then sentenced to death but was later released from gaol due to a widely circulated petition.

Mamitpa also gave evidence at the trial of Wandi Wandi, and five other Aboriginal men, on trial for the murder of six Malaysian men and, in addition to testifying, he acted as an interpreter for several of the accused and other witnesses. Wandi Wandi was found guilty and hanged.

In 1899 Mamitpa began working for Alfred Joseph Voules Brown, a trepanger and customs officer, and they worked together for 30 years.

Mamitpa died in September 1931 and is buried at Gudji, at Fort Wellington.

== See also ==
- List of Indigenous Australian historical figures
