= Alfred Joseph Voules Brown =

Australian trepanger and trader (1868–1955)

- Born: 24 October 1868; St Marys, South Australia
- Died: 21 July 1955 (aged 86); Linden Park, South Australia

Alfred Joseph Voules Brown, also known as Alf Brown Inyjarurri (24 October 1868 – 21 July 1955), was an Australian customs officer, trepanger, trader who lived on the Cobourg Peninsula for much of his life and spent a significant amount of time living with the Iwaidja people.

== Biography ==
Brown was the third child of Victor Voules Brown and his first wife Julia (née Solomon) in St Marys, South Australia, where he spent much of his early life. In September 1885 he went with his father and uncle (John Alexander Voules Brown) to the Cambridge Gulf in Western Australia where they landed goods for the Durack family. Brown then went on to Derby where he joined the Kimberley gold rush and spent the next 13 years in the region, mostly working on cattle stations.

In 1888 Brown began acting as a shipping clerk and storeman for his father in Darwin, in the Northern Territory, and also held a number of mining (mineral) licenses. Between 1891 and 1899 he returned to The Kimberley and little is known of his life during this period except that, for a period, he worked for the pearler William Hewell James. James was notorious for the poor treatment of the Aboriginal people working for him and Brown is said to have twice fought James in objection to his cruelty.

In October 1899 Brown returned to Darwin and began working as a trepanger at a business his father had purchased for him from EO Robinson on the Bowen Strait, on the Cobourg Peninsula. In this business he was assisted by Tingha de Hans (also recorded Tinggha), a Masaccan trepanger who Brown relied on heavily and he acted as an interpreter for him and understood fishery more than Brown did; he also had a much better knowledge of the area they fishing then Brown. Tingha also helped Brown develop positive relationships with the Iwaidja people living in the area was instrumental in Brown's success to be able to employ many of them to work with him. Many of the Iwaidja called Brown 'the Commandant' or 'the Commander' and Mamitpa, who is also known as Tim Finnigen, worked with him for many years. While at Bowen Strait was also appointed the 'Acting Landing Waiter' for customers there and, from 1899 – 1906 collected duties from visiting Macassan traders.

In 1901 Brown gave evidence to the Dashwood Enquiry, led by Charles James Dashwood, into the pearling and trepanging industry and whether 'non-white' people should be employed in the industry and whether it could be profitably carried out with 'white' labour only. Brown defended the industry and openly disagreed with those who lobbied for the exclusion of Macassan traders and stated that, unlike they were accused of doing, they had not brought venereal disease to the surrounding communities and that, because of the customs duties he collected, they brought only small amounts of alcohol with them which was purely for their own consumption. He stated that the problems within the industry existed independently of any 'supposed Macassan competition'.

Following this enquiry, in which he gained respect from the government of the day, Brown was appointed the assistant health officer of Bowen Strait and made frequent trips to Darwin to sell loads of trepang, as well as other goods produced in the region. These goods included buffalo hides collected by Robert Joel Cooper and Patrick "Paddy" Cahill. During the early 1900s Brown also diversified by taking out several pastoral leases.

In July 1906, when the South Australian Government decided to terminate the Macassan trepanging industry Brown was no longer required to by the customs officer but he continued his business there.

In 1906 Brown married Mumulaj, an Iwaidja and Macassan, according to the traditional customs of the Iwaidja and she remained his partner until she died; together they had two children Mujerambi (b. 1910) and Mulwagug (b. 1911). Through Mujerambi, who was also known as Marjorie, he is the father-in-law of Kapiu Masi Gagai. Brown is also recorded to have married sisters Lily Malyurrgi and Daisy Injarraldaj (Magulagi) from the Majunbalmi clan and later Audrey Wungarumala of the Danek clan. Through his years living in the region, and through his family, Brown learned to speak Marrgu as well as the closely related Garig and Ilgar languages and made recordings of these.

During World War II Brown remained in the area and, when the Japanese bombed Darwin in February 1942 (see: Bombing of Darwin), he was evacuated to Alice Springs with a number of family members. He travelled from there to Adelaide where he remained until he died on 21 July 1955.
