= Acacia convallium =

Scientific classification
- Kingdom: Plantae
- Clade: Tracheophytes
- Clade: Angiosperms
- Clade: Eudicots
- Clade: Rosids
- Order: Fabales
- Family: Fabaceae
- Subfamily: Caesalpinioideae
- Clade: Mimosoid clade
- Genus: Acacia
- Species: A. convallium

Binomial name
- Acacia convallium Pedley
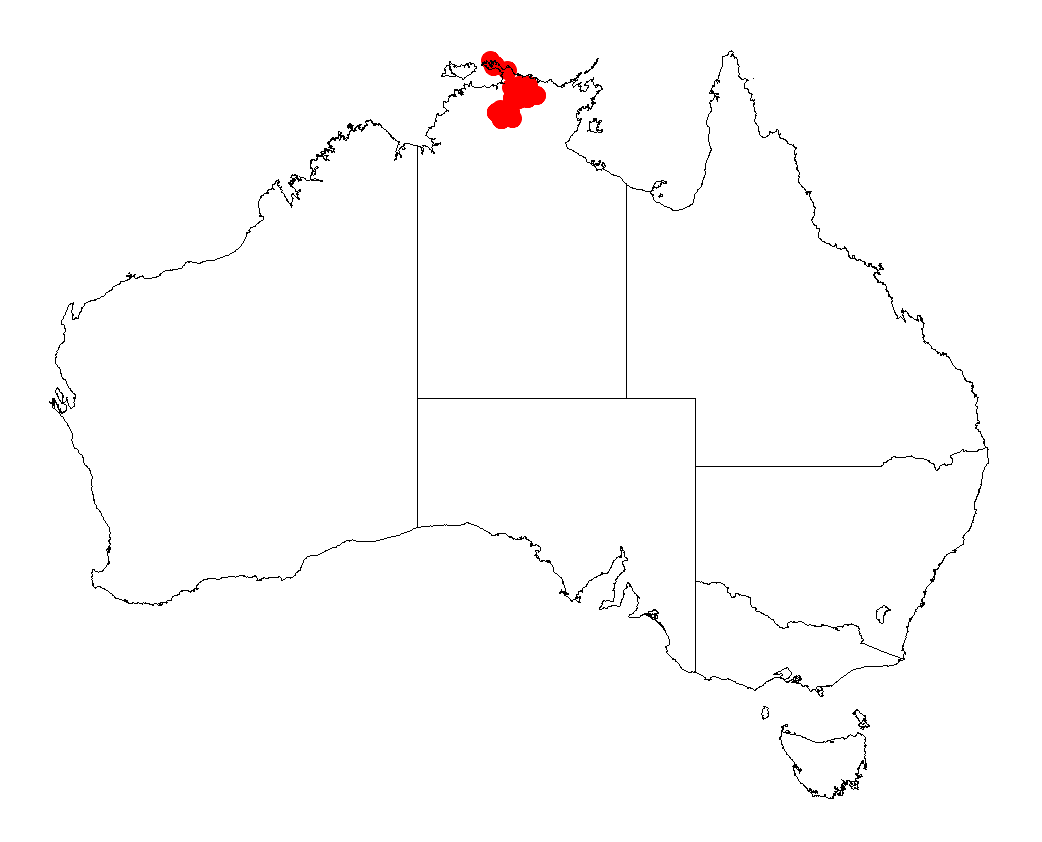
- Occurrence data from AVH

Synonyms
- Racosperma convallium (Pedley) Pedley

Species of legume

Acacia convallium is a species of flowering plant in the family Fabaceae and is endemic to the north of the Northern Territory, Australia. It is a tree with egg-shaped, curved phyllodes, heads of creamy to golden yellow flowers and woody pods.

== Description ==
Acacia convallium is a tree that typically grows to a height of up to 6 m (20 ft), its young branchlet covered with felty, short hairs. The phyllodes are egg-shaped to sickle-shaped, 90–175 mm (3.5–6.9 in) long and 12–40 mm (0.47–1.57 in) wide with two or three prominent veins and two to four glands on the upper edges of the phyllodes. The flowers are borne in four to six heads in upper axils on peduncles 12–17 mm (0.47–0.67 in) long, each head with about 30 creamy to golden yellow flowers. Flowering occurs in April and May and the pods are woody, up to 110 mm (4.3 in) long and 28–37 mm (1.1–1.5 in) wide with a wing 2.5–3.5 mm (0.098–0.138 in) wide on the edge. The seeds are 8.0–8.5 mm (0.31–0.33 in) long, 2.5–3.5 mm (0.098–0.138 in) wide and 3.0–3.5 mm (0.12–0.14 in) thick with a stout, cup-shaped aril on the end.

== Taxonomy ==
Acacia convallium was first formally described in 1999 by Leslie Pedley in the journal Austrobaileya, from specimens collected near the East Alligator River by Norman Byrnes in 1972. The specific epithet (convallium) means 'a valley shut in on all sides', an allusion to the plant's habitat.

This species belong in the Section Plurinerves.

== Distribution and habitat ==
This species of wattle restricted to a small area in the top end of the Northern Territory along the Coburg Peninsula and the upper catchments of the Alligator and Liverpool Rivers where it is grows in gorges or on sandstone escarpments in skeletal sandy or deep sandy soils. It is found in the Garig Gunak Barlu and Kakadu National Parks.

== Conservation status ==
Acacia convallium is listed as of "least concern" under the Northern Territory Territory Parks and Wildlife Conservation Act.

== See also ==
- List of Acacia species
