= Cape Don Light =

Lighthouse in Northern Territory, Australia

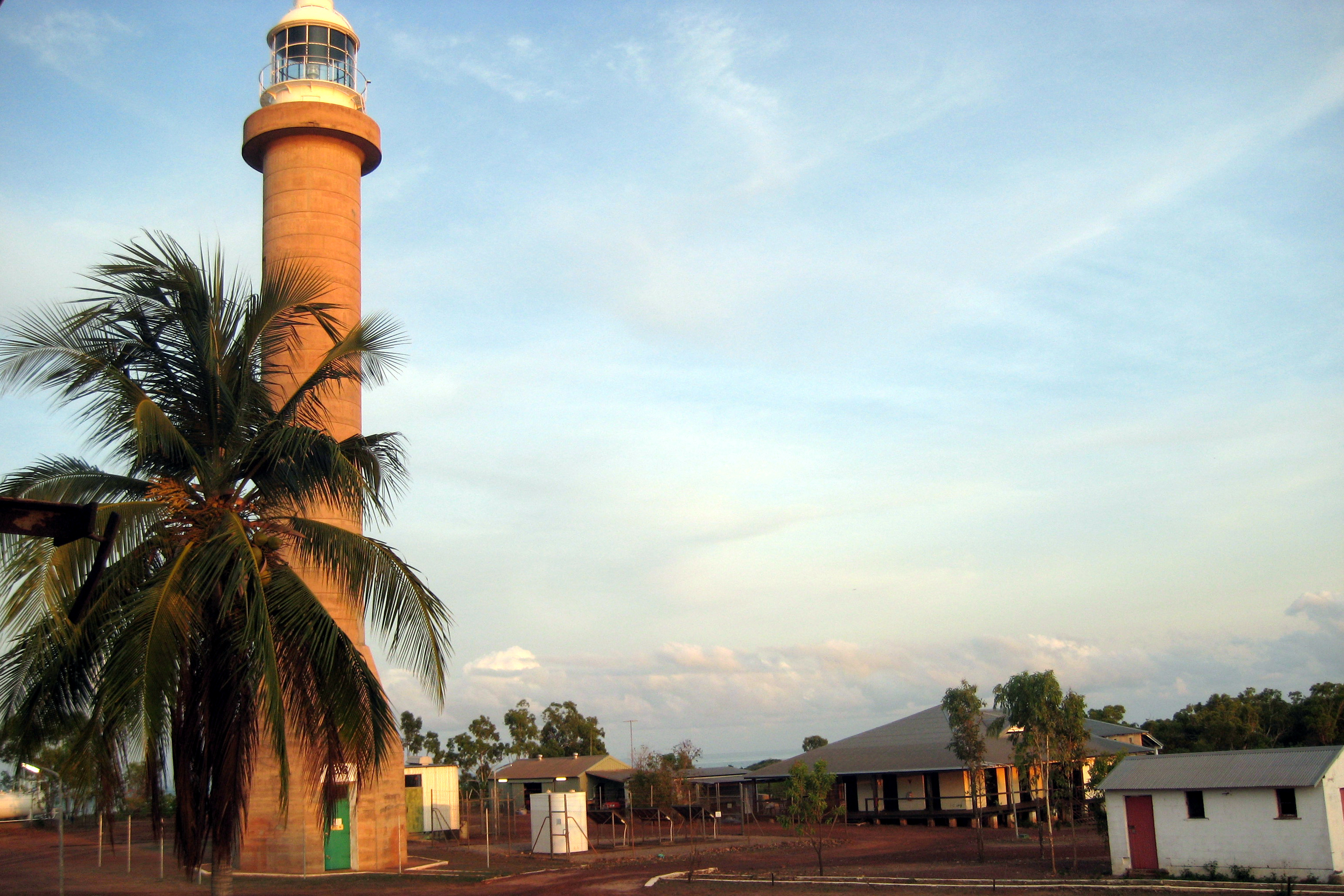
- Cape Don Lightstation. One of the keeper's cottages visible to the right.
- Location: Cobourg Peninsula; Northern Territory; Australia
- Coordinates: 11°18′28.36″S 131°45′54.56″E

Tower
- Constructed: 1917
- Construction: reinforced concrete tower
- Automated: 1983
- Height: 118 feet (36 m)
- Shape: cylindrical tower on octagonal prism basement with balcony and lantern
- Markings: unpainted tower, white lantern
- Power source: solar power

Light
- Focal height: 163 feet (50 m)
- Lens: Chance Brothers 3rd order Fresnel lens
- Intensity: 260,000 cd
- Range: 22 nautical miles (41 km)
- Characteristic: Fl W 10s.

Cape Don Light is an active lighthouse located on Cape Don, at the tip of the Cobourg Peninsula, Northern Territory, Australia, in Garig Gunak Barlu National Park, marking the entrance to the Dundas Strait. It is Australia's northernmost traditional lighthouse. The station served on the important route to Darwin, between the peninsula and Melville Island. The tower was constructed in 1915–1917, during the "Golden Age of Australian Lighthouses" (1913–1920), and the tower was manned until 1983. During the entire period that the tower was manned it also maintained meteorological records which were well placed to assist in cyclone development tracking. The complex consists of the lighthouse, three residences and ancillary buildings.

Cape Don was named by Phillip Parker King in 1818, as a compliment to General Sir George Don, the Lieutenant-Governor of Gibraltar.

== History ==
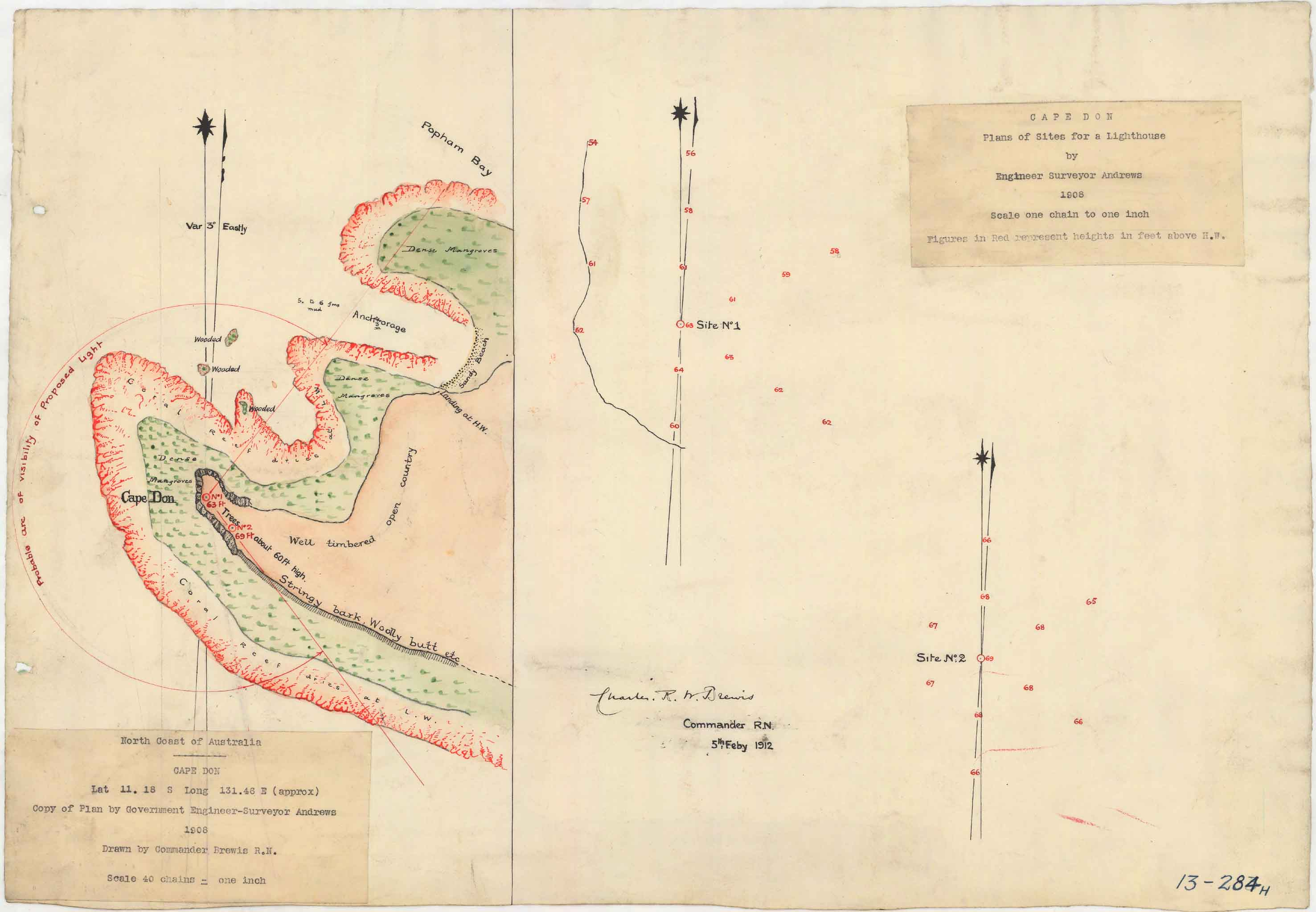
Plans for the site copied in 1912 from 1908 plans

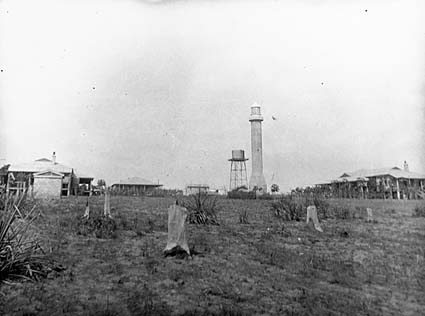
Cape Don Light on the year in which construction finished, 1917

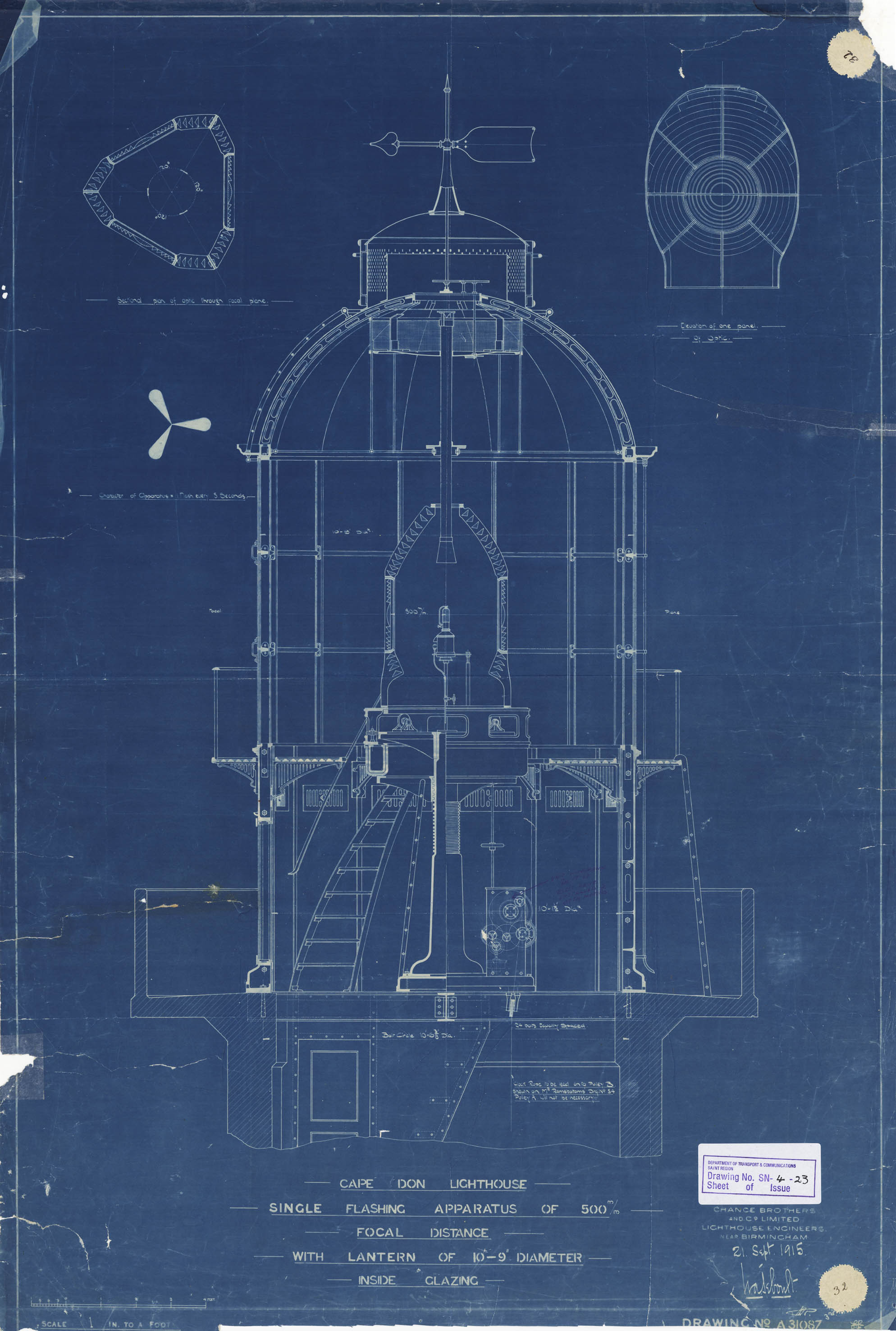
Plans for the optical apparatus

The Northern Territory was transferred from the government of South Australia to the federal parliament in 1911. The Commonwealth Lighthouse Service was officially formed on 1 July 1915, and one of the first actions of the service was to realise the need for a lighthouse on the Cobourg Peninsula, as the passage between the peninsula and Melville Island was an important route to Darwin. Construction of the tower was the largest project undertaken by the Commonwealth Lighthouse Service during the "Golden Age of Australian Lighthouses" (1913–1920).

Work on the tower began in May 1915. An iron structure was deemed unsuitable due to the tropical conditions, and the local ironstone was not suitable for concrete, so materials had to be shipped from Melbourne. However, landing conditions at the site meant the closest location for landing the materials was about 3 miles (5 km) to the east, at Christies Bay. A jetty and a tramway were constructed, and the materials were drawn by horses from the landing location. The climate and the grade meant only two round trips could be made each day, and in addition, construction could only be carried out on the dry season, from April to November. As a result, construction took three years, completing in June 1917. Though the lantern was installed and ready to be lit, an earthquake hit the tower in August 1917. Though the structure was not damaged, 12 kilograms (26 lb) of mercury were lost from the mercury-bearing pedestal bath. The lighthouse was finally officially lit on 15 September 1917.

The tower original light source was a 55-millimetre (2.2 in) vapourised kerosene incandescent mantle, with an intensity of 150,000 cd and a visible range of 23 nautical miles (43 km; 26 mi). The original lens was a Chance Brothers 3rd order 500-millimetre (20 in) dioptric fresnel lens. The apparatus was a rotating pedestal floating in a mercury bath, operated by a clockwork mechanism with descending weights, which only had to be rewound once every twelve hours.

In the Second World War, a radar station was installed near the complex.

In the early 1970s, the tower was electrified, with power coming from diesel generators. The light source was converted to a 120-volt tungsten-halogen lamp.

In 1983 the light was automated and the station was demanned. The apparatus installed consists of four vertical panels, each consisting of four 300-millimetre (12 in) rear surfaced parabolic reflectors. The lamps are 12-volt 36-watt quartz halogen lamps, electrically connected in pairs 180° apart. The apparatus is installed on a gear-less pedestal, rotating three times per minute, showing a light characteristic of one white flash every 10 seconds (Fl.W. 10s). The light intensity is 260,000 cd and the light is visible for 22 nautical miles (41 km; 25 mi). The light is solar powered, and it was the first of its kind in Australia. At the same time the cottages were handed over to the Northern Territory Conservation Commission.

In 2005, the original lens and its rotating apparatus were discovered in storage and donated to the Queensland Maritime Museum in Brisbane.

== Structures ==
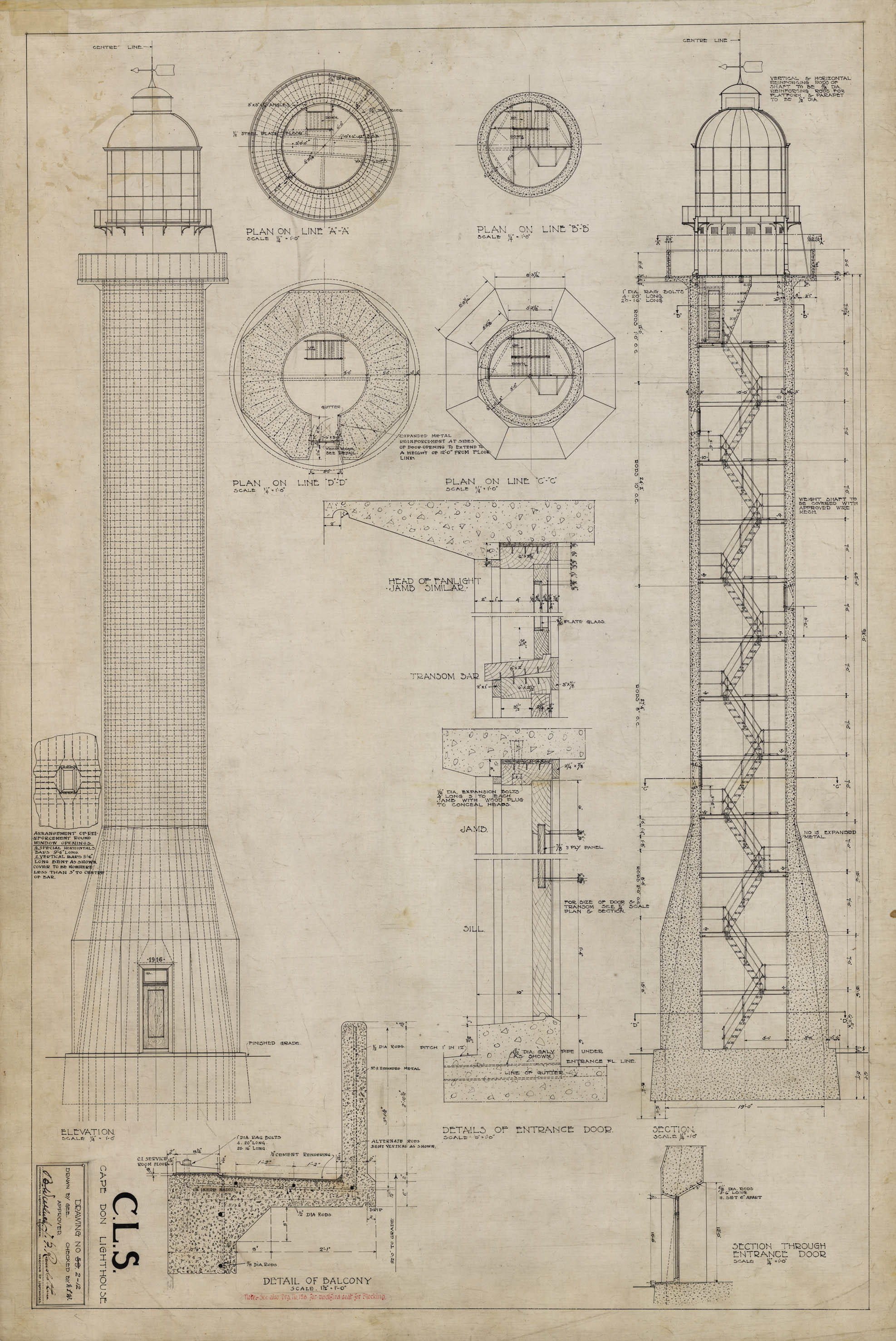
Tower plans and sections, 1915

The tower is 28 metres (92 ft) from the ground to the platform. The base is cylindrical, with an octagonal base. On top of the platform is the original 10-foot, 8-inch (3.25 m) Chance Brothers lantern.

Accommodations at the site consist of three lighthouse keeper's cottages, constructed from concrete blocks, set on high blocks with reinforced concrete beams. The cottages have timber floors and wide timber verandahs, enclosed with pivoting storm screens. The original roofing was corrugated galvanised iron, replaced by corrugated asbestos cement roofing in one of the houses. Originally, a breezeway divided the houses into two sections, one comprising three rooms and one comprising two larger rooms, with a corridor between them leading to the double doors to the verandah. The building has been altered, and the original breezeway has been converted to a living area.

Other structures in the complex include small concrete block storage sheds, adjacent to each of the houses, block work sheds around the tower, and some galvanised iron sheds including a powerhouse, a maintenance workshop and a store. At the northern boundary of the complex lies a bore and mill, and an abandoned garden next to it. The original raised water tank is at the center of the complex.

The path of the original tramway, from the complex to Christies Bay, is still visible, and the narrow gauge tramway itself is partially intact, except towards the bay. At the end of the tramway is a causeway, approximately 90 metres (300 ft) long and 4 metres (13 ft) wide, going through a mangrove swamp into the bay. At its end is a shelter. The jetty no longer exists, though the upright tramway rails which supported it still exist.

== Site operation ==
The light is operated by the Australian Maritime Safety Authority, while the site is managed by the Garig Gunak Barlu National Park authorities.

== Visiting ==
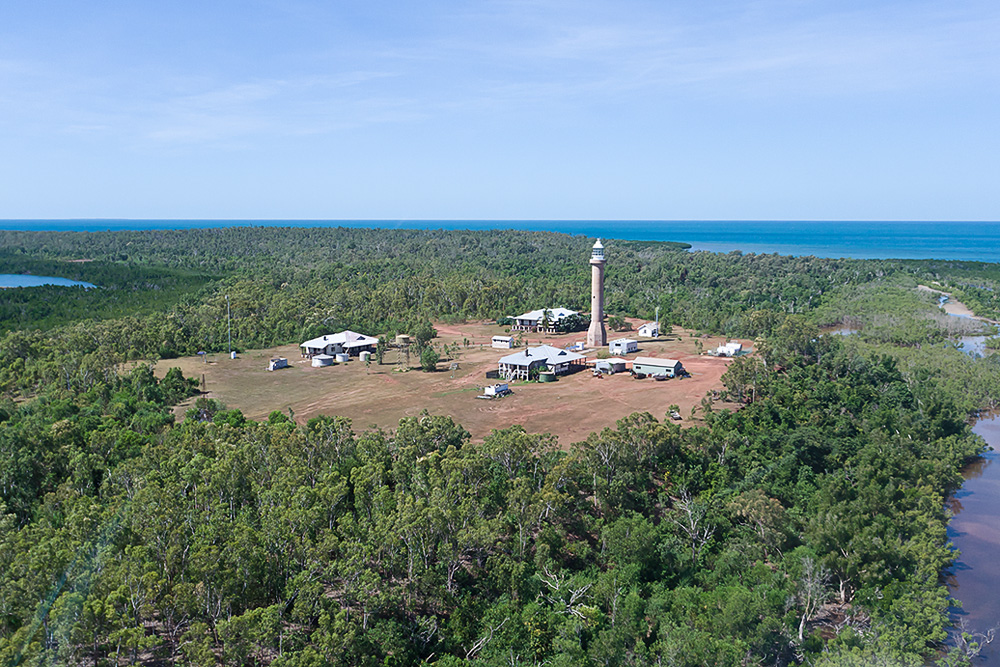
The Cape Don Lightstation, 2007

The location is accessible for 4WD car only in the dry season (May–October) and requires permits and paying a fee. The site is also accessible by air and boat. The tower is closed to the public. The head lighthouse keeper's house has been converted to a fishing lodge and is available for overnight accommodations.

== See also ==
- List of lighthouses in Australia
