= Angelo Confalonieri =

Italian missionary in Australia (1813–1848)

Angelo Bernardo Confalonieri (22 June 1813 – 9 June 1848) was an Italian linguist, cartographer and missionary. He was the first Catholic missionary to the Northern Territory in Australia, where he served on the Cobourg Peninsula.

== Early life ==
Confalonieri was born in Riva del Garda, in northern Italy, son of Peter and Mary Confalonieri.

When he initially joined the priesthood, he studied in Trento; after completing his studies, he served for a number of years in Ala before entering the Pontifical Urban College for the Propagation of the Faith in Rome.

In Rome, Confalonieri met John Brady, the soon to be bishop of Perth, who had travelled there to recruit missionaries and seek financial assistance for the region. Based on their conversation he agreed to travel to Australia and work on the Cobourg Peninsula. Brady was very impressed with Confalonieri due to his zeal and his evident gift for languages.

== The shipwreck of the Heroine ==
The journey from Italy to Fremantle, via London, took four months and Confalonieri, alongside Irish priests James Fagan and Nicholas Hogan, arrived in January 1846. On 1 March 1846 they left Fremantle to head to their final destination and they had to first travel to Sydney and then the Torres Strait Islands; at one o'clock in the morning of 24 July 1846 their ship, the Heroine, struck a reef there and sank within six minutes. Confalonieri, and a number of other passengers, where able to cling to the topmast head and Nelson, a Newfoundland dog owned by the ship's mate Mr Ral, helped move the survivors to a nearby reef where they were picked up from at daylight. Eight people died in the shipwreck, including James Fagan and Nicholas Hogan, and twenty-six people survived.

In the shipwreck Confalonieri lost all of his possessions, including his glasses, and, as the result of requests through media substantial funds where raised for Confalonieri and his soon to be established mission.

== Life in the Northern Territory ==
After the shipwreck Confalonieri was taken to Port Essington, on the Coburg Peninsula and had a period of recuperation. He was greeted warmly by James McArthur, the commandant, who soon after arranged for the construction of a home for him on top of the Red Cliffs to the side of Black Rock about 29 kilometres (18 mi) from the main settlement; this was done for Confalonieri as he was impractical in relation to domestic matters and did not even know how to mix or cook his ration of flour.

At the settlement Confalonieri lived with the Iwaidja people and quickly mastered the Iwaidja language; he amazed people with how quickly he was able to learn the language. A visitor to the settlement, John Sweatman, laughed when he realised that Confalonieri had (likely unknowingly) learned many Iwaidja obscenities and used them in sermons.

A later church source reported that Confalonieri made 400 converts in his time at Port Essington but also that he faced occasional hostility and theft from older members of the community and Confalonieri himself said that the Iwaidja people had "no understanding but for their belly".

Graves of Father Angelo Confalonieri (front) and Mrs Emma Lambrick (back), date unknown

As well as ministering to the community Confalonieri also studied the Iwaidja and spent significant amount of time exploring the Coburg Peninsula and preparing maps, showing the clan areas, and making small vocabulary lists of seven of the local dialects. He also translated the Lord's Prayer, the Hail Mary, the Creed and created the manuscript of a prayer book and short Catechism which included the Ten Commandments and parts of the New Testament.

Confalonieri died of fever from malaria on 9 June 1848 less than two years after arriving there. It is believed that, before his death, he suffered from malnutrition.

He was buried alongside Emma Lambrick, the first European woman to die at the settlement in 1846.
