= Wurango =

Aboriginal Australian people

The Wurango or Wurrugu were an indigenous Australian people of the Northern Territory.

== Country ==
The Wurango's tribal lands encompassed about 500 square miles (1,300 km^{2}) around the western end of the Cobourg Peninsula including Port Essington.

== People ==
Crawford Pasco described the Wurango as he found them in 1838 as numerous, and in very good health since many reached the venerable age of 70.

== Social organisation ==
Norman Tindale speculated that mentions of the Tji and Jalo in this area clearly referring to the Wurango probably denoted hordes. If so, then he classified their respective localities as follows:

- Tji, a Wurango horde located at the western end of the Peninsula
- Ja:lo, a Wurango horde in Port Essington

The following clan marriage sections are said to have existed: (Note: G.Windsor Earl, writes of Manjarojalli, Manjarwüli, and Mambulgit, mistaking these to be castes. He added however that Manjarojalli comes from ojelli (fire) meaning that this skin section sprang from fire; that Manjarwüli came from the land, while Mambulgit, though obscure, referred to net-weavers. (Earl 1846, pp. 240–241))

- Manderojelli
- Manburlgeat
- Mandrowilli

== Alternative names ==
- Auwulwarwak
- Ja:lo (ja:lo = 'no')
- (?) Limba-Karadjee (Note: Limba Karadjee was the name assigned to the Port Essington tribe by E.M.Curr's informant, Crawford Pasco (Pasco 1886, p. 268)) (See Iwaidja)
- Wa:reidbug, Woreidbug
- Warooko
- Wurrunga, Wurrango
- Wuru:ku, U:ru:ku
- Yarlo

Source: Tindale 1974, p. 238

== Sources ==
- "AIATSIS map of Indigenous Australia". AIATSIS. 14 May 2024.
- Earl, G. Windsor (1846). "On the Aboriginal Tribes of the Northern Coast of Australia". The Journal of the Royal Geographical Society of London. 16: 239–251. doi:10.2307/1798232. JSTOR 1798232.
- Jennison, J. C. (1927). "Notes on the language of the Elcho Island aborigines". Transactions of the Royal Society of South Australia. 51: 177–192.
- Pasco, Crawford (1886). "Port Essington" (PDF). In Curr, Edward Micklethwaite (ed.). The Australian race: its origin, languages, customs, place of landing in Australia and the routes by which it spread itself over the continent. Vol. 1. Melbourne: J. Ferres. pp. 268–269.
- Tindale, Norman Barnett (1974). "Wurango (NT)". Aboriginal Tribes of Australia: Their Terrain, Environmental Controls, Distribution, Limits, and Proper Names. Australian National University. ISBN 978-0-708-10741-6. Archived from the original on 21 March 2018.
