= Mildirn =

Indigenous Australian mariner and leader

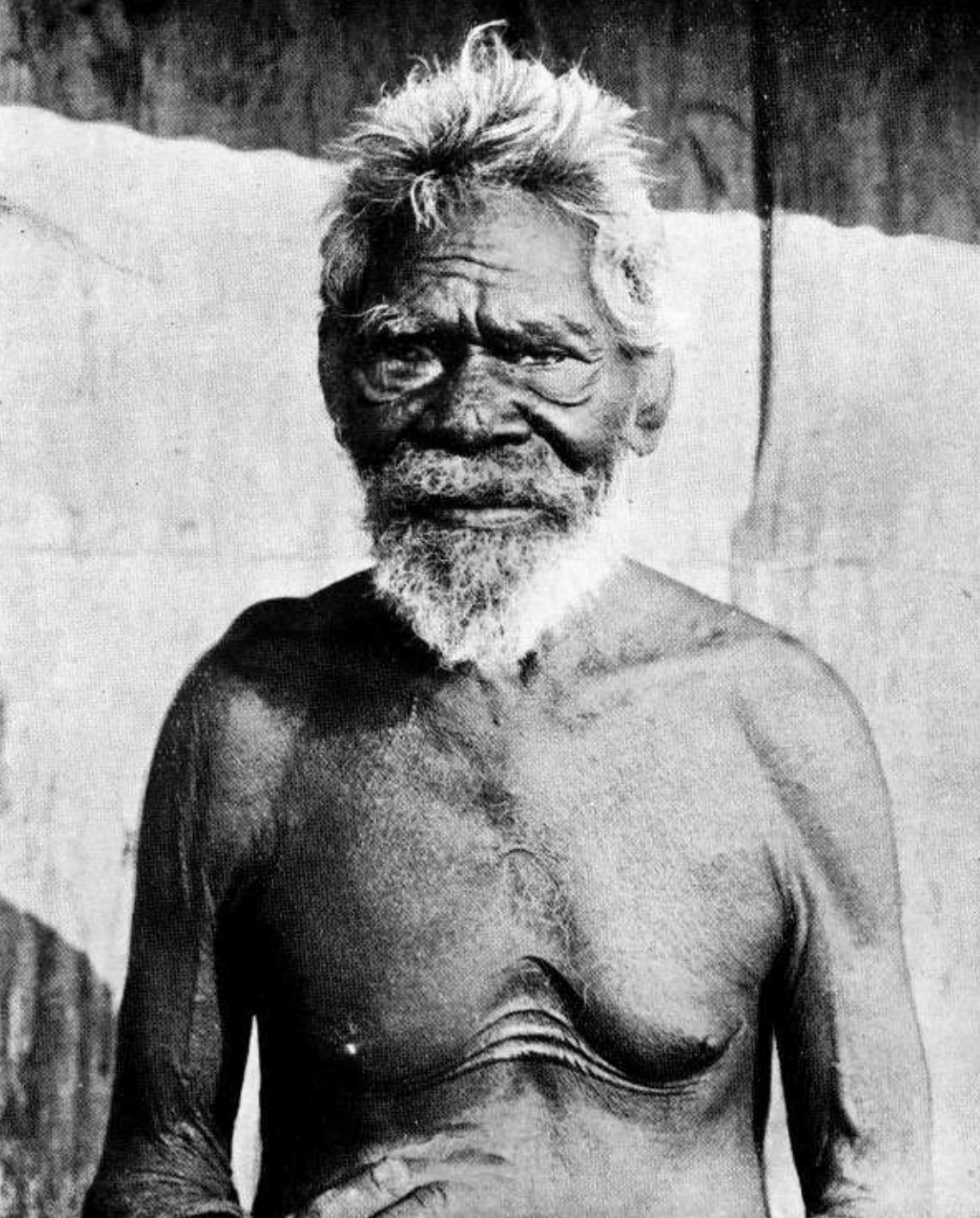
Port Essington Jack, aged 94.

Mildirn (c.1835 – August 1918) sometimes spelt Medlone, also known as Jack Davis, Old Jack Davis or Port Essington Jack was a well-known Iwaidja-Garig Indigenous Australian leader, translator and mariner from Port Essington, a site of an early British military outpost in the Northern Territory of Australia. He is famous for having been abducted as a child and taken to Hong Kong where he lived for a number of years before being rescued and returned home.

== Early life ==
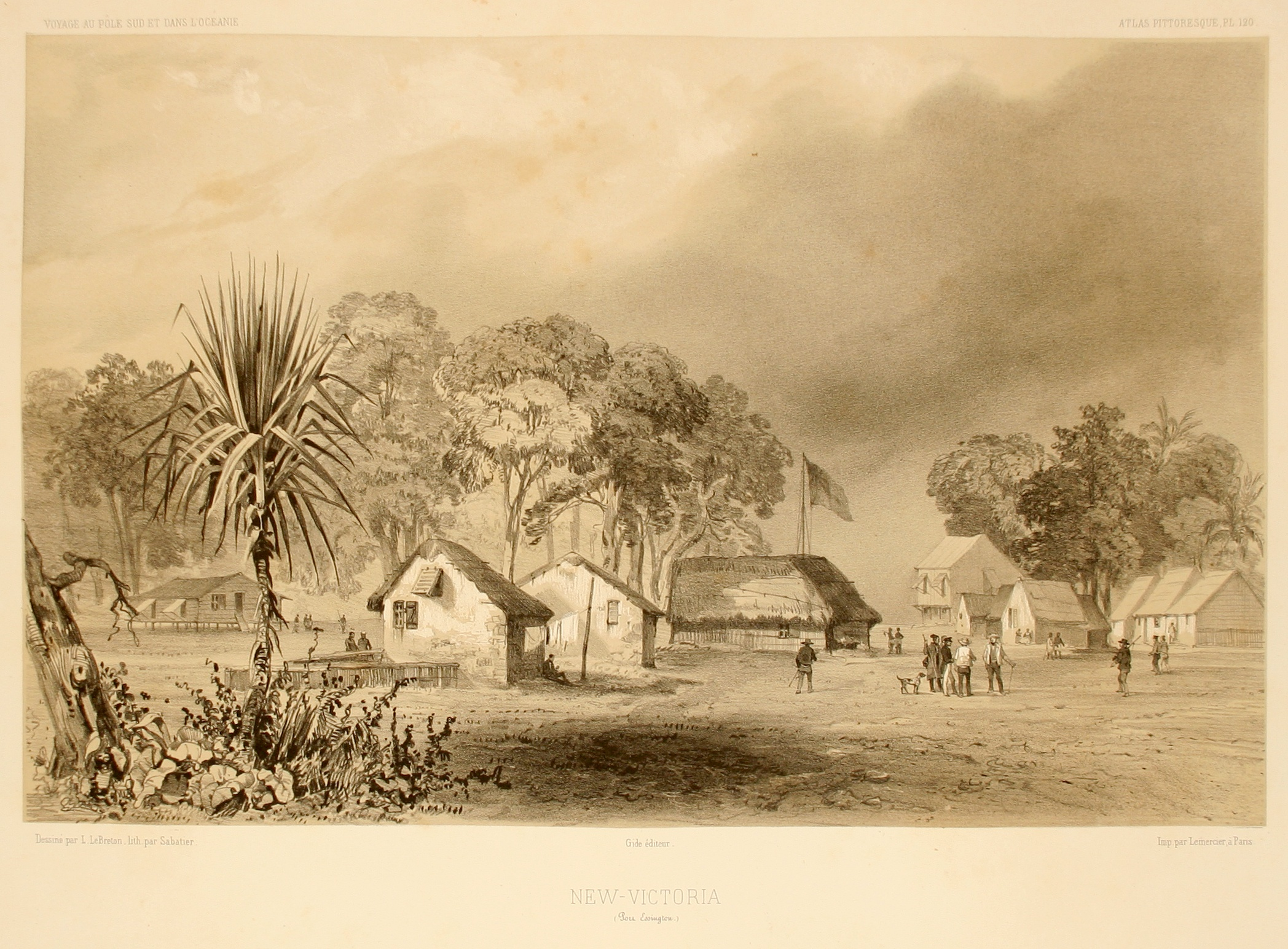
Port Essington in 1846

Mildirn was born around 1835 on the Cobourg Peninsula in the what would become known as the Northern Territory. He was four years old when the Port Essington military outpost was established by the British on his homeland. He became 'something of a pet with the regiment'. He was a messenger for the officers and was well known for 'giving vent to the most horrible blasphemies and obscenities' which he had learnt from the soldiers. He became a well-known point of contact for any matters pertaining to Port Essington, advising visitors to the area and managing relations with his people.

== Kidnapped and taken to Hong Kong ==
In 1847, at the age of twelve, Mildirn and two of his brothers, Aladyin and Mijolk, were kidnapped by the captain of a merchant ship and taken to Hong Kong. Mildirn and his brothers were left stranded in Hong Kong for a period of somewhere around two years, after the captain who abducted them died from fever.

Eventually the boys were recognised by Commander Crawford Pasco, who was a naval officer that had served at Port Essington, and who happened to be visiting Hong Kong on board HMS Vulture. Pasco organised the boys' return to Port Essington, and later received correspondence from the Colonel in charge of the outpost advising him that Mildirn had arrived safely to Port Essington. However, one of his brothers, Mijolk, had died on the journey.

== Life after returning to Port Essington ==
Port Essington was abandoned by the British as a military outpost, in 1849, which was not long after Mildirn's return to his homeland.

For the next twenty years, Mildirn crewed on a merchant ship. In this time he became a fluent speaker of English and Malay and it was in this period that he acquired the name 'Jack Davis'. He was away so long that he was assumed dead by his people. When he returned he was not recognised. He had to prove his identity and relearn some of the local language.

Mildirn's son, Nanyenya was taken to Adelaide by John Lewis, who ran a buffalo enterprise near Port Essington. A popular but troublesome boy, he became 'too much for the people of Adelaide'. After jumping ship to Queensland, he returned to Adelaide where he fell ill and died.

Due to his excellent English, Mildirn became the main intermediary between the Indigenous people of the Cobourg Peninsula and the British colonists who had come to the Northern Territory from the late 1860s to take up land and establish administrative control. He was the leading point of contact when the British visited the region and he also assisted in maintaining the peace when the police were pursuing local Aboriginal outlaws, like Wandi Wandi.

== Later life ==
Mildirn lived to over 80 years of age and was said to be the oldest person in the Northern Territory at the time. He was described in 1914, as "a stooping, sightless old blackfellow, the last of his race". Despite his old age, he was still able to tell stories of Port Essington, the last living person who witnessed this chapter in Australian history. He could still name the officers and mimic the voice of the drill sergeant.

He died in August 1918 from influenza and was buried at Spear Point in Port Essington.

== See also ==
- List of Indigenous Australian historical figures
