= Yaako =

Aboriginal Australian people

The Jaako (Yaako) were an indigenous Australian people of the Northern Territory.

== Name ==
The Jaako were one of the four tribes in Arnhem Land that employed their word for 'no' as the basis for their endonym.

== Language ==
The language spoken on Croker Island, Jaako territory, was called Marrku.

== Country ==
The extent of Jaako territory is estimated to have been around 300 square miles (780 km^{2}), including Croker Island, which they called either Mangulalgut or Margo. They also held land on the area on the Cobourg Peninsula on the mainland opposite, and were also present at Raffles Bay.

== People ==
The early explorer G. Windsor Earl stated that the Jaako appeared to be formed from the "amalgamation" of two distinct tribes. Earl claimed on the one hand that they were a disagreeable people, who blindly followed their chieftains, and engaged in theft, but on the other hand that they treated with generous hospitality Earl's party when they visited the Jaako on Croker Island. Earl states that:

The people of this tribe are generally small in stature, ill-formed and their countenances are forbidding and disagreeable. The hair is generally coarse and bushy. The beards and whiskers of the men are thick and curly, while the entire body is often covered with short crisp hair, which about the breast and shoulders is sometimes so thick as to conceal the skin. The eyes are small, and what should be the white has a dull muddly appearance.

Their leader at the time was, again according to Earl, a certain Mimaloo, whom together with another warrior, Loka, later killed by the Makassans in revenge for the death of one of their own, was regarded as highly aggressive.

== Alternative names ==
- Ajokoot
- Margu (name for their language)
- Marlgu
- Marrgu, Ma:go, Margo (toponym for Croker Island)
- Terutong
- Yaako (ja:ko means 'no')

Source: Tindale 1974, p. 227

== Sources ==
- Earl, G. Windsor (1846). "On the Aboriginal Tribes of the Northern Coast of Australia". The Journal of the Royal Geographical Society of London. 16: 239–251. doi:10.2307/1798232. JSTOR 1798232.
- Earl, G. Windsor (1853). The native races of the Indian Archipelago: Papuans (PDF). London: H. Bailliere.
- Evans, Nicholas (2016). "As intimate as it gets? Paradigm borrowing in Marrku and its implications for the emergence of mixed languages". In Meakins, Felicity; O'Shannessy, Carmel (eds.). Loss and Renewal: Australian Languages Since Colonisation. Walter de Gruyter. pp. 29–56. ISBN 978-1-614-51879-2.
- Tindale, Norman Barnett (1974). "Jaako (NT)". Aboriginal Tribes of Australia: Their Terrain, Environmental Controls, Distribution, Limits, and Proper Names. Australian National University. ISBN 978-0-708-10741-6. Archived from the original on 20 March 2020.
