= Emma Lambrick =

Australian settler (1822– 1846)

Emma Jane Lambrick née Dillon (4 August 1822 – October 1846) was an early resident of Port Essington in the Northern Territory of Australia who died there in relation to maternal death.

== Early life ==
Lambrick was the daughter of Lieutenant Dillon, of the Royal Navy, and his wife Susan and was born at Perranarworthal in Cornwall. On 24 November 1842 she married Lieutenant George Lambrick at Budock Water and, in August 1843 their first daughter Emma was born.

In 1844 George Lambrick was placed in charge of the military guard of a convict ship, the Cadet, where they were to deliver convicts to Hobart before travelling onwards to Port Essington to serve under Captain John McArthur. Lambrick was given permission to accompany her husband on the journey and join him at the settlement. The ship sailed in April 1844 and there were several other women onboard who were to accompany their husbands to Port Essington, one of these women was Esther Norman who suffered a stillbirth while at sea and died herself weeks later.

Lambrick herself was pregnant while at sea and was reported, by her husband, as being "in the most delicate state of health". She would give birth to George Lambrick Jnr, when they were on their way up the Western Australian coast, in October 1844 who was recorded to have been a sickly child.

== Life in the Northern Territory ==
When Lambrick arrived at Port Essington she and her family were housed in a small wooden dwelling which was above the storekeeper's quarters which was entered by external stairs. This was as it was McArthur's policy to keep married men, and their families, apart from other residents. Lambrick was additionally isolated for, as the only wife of an officer, she was separated from the other women. John Sweatman, who spent several weeks at the settlement, stayed with Lambrick and her family and remarked that she was "without society, no amusement and no one but her husband to talk to, and he is busy with his duties most of the time". He additionally described her as a "truly amiable and sensible woman".

Soon after arrival Lambrick became pregnant with her third child and, while awaiting their birth, her son George Jnr, who was never of good health, died; likely of malaria. In response to this death McArthur requested an additional medical officer to be stationed there who arrived in October. Lambrick then lost her third child, another son, shortly after his birth.

In October 1846 Lambrick died, only a month after the loss of her son; this was a maternal death. Her husband George erected a special monument to her at her grave, the material for which were sent from England. She was the first European woman to die at the settlement.

Later, in 1848, the Catholic missionary Angelo Confalonieri, would be buried alongside her.

The grave of Emma Lambrick at Port Essington, 1875

George Lambrick and their daughter Emma remained at Port Essington until 1849.

In 1913 Elsie Masson visited the gave and remarked;

She came with her little daughter to Port Essington, doubtless expecting to find a comfortable sociable military settlement. A year passed, her baby was born and both she and her child died and were buried at this lonely spot.

— Elsie Masson, Port Essington and its ruins, The Argus (Melbourne), 30 August 1913

== Legacy ==
- Emma Court, in Driver, Northern Territory, is named for Lambrick.
- Lambrick Avenue, which passes through localities of the Litchfield Municipality, is named for Lambrick and her husband.
- A police boat, the PV Emma Lambrick, was also named for her.
