= Iwaidja people =

Indigenous Australian people of the Northern Territory

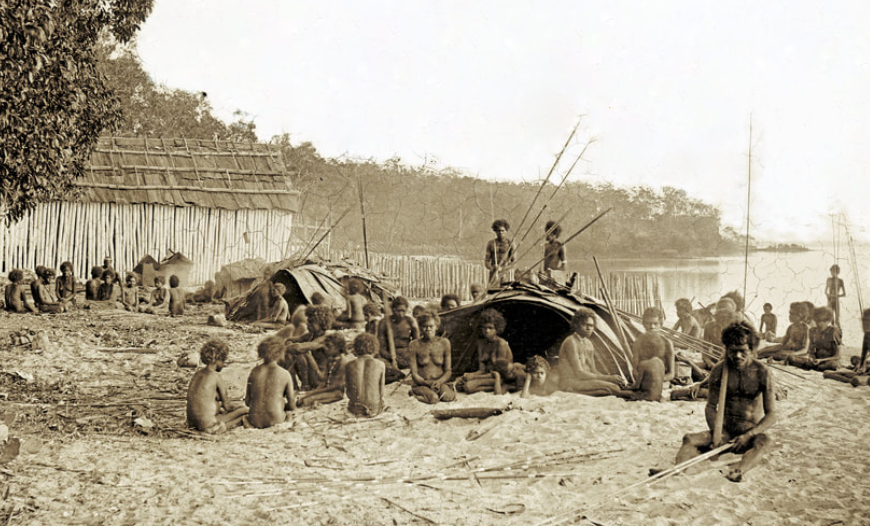
Photograph of an Iwaidja camp at Port Essington taken by Paul Foelsche in 1877

The Iwaidja are an Indigenous Australian people of the Cobourg Peninsula in the Northern Territory. In the modern day, they have also become known as the Arrarrkbi or Warrkbi people, reflecting their amalgamation since British colonisation with the neighbouring survivors of the Garig, Ilgar, Marrgu and Wurrugu people, as well as having various non-Indigenous ancestry.

== Name ==
Norman Tindale states that the name is based on their word for 'no' (ii).

Alternative names include Eaewardja, Eiwaja, Juwadja, Limba-Karadjee, Limbakaraja, Tarula (Tiwi language exonym meaning 'riflemen'), (Note: According to Tindale, they earned this monicker from the fact that they were employed by buffalo shooter, Joe Cooper, to help him invade the Tiwi Islands in 1905. (Tindale 1974, p. 227)) Unalla, and Uwaidja.

== Language ==
Iwaidja is one of the Iwaidjan languages of the Cobourg Peninsula, all of which are non-Pama–Nyungan languages. It is still spoken by some 150 speakers, at Minjilang on Croker Island.

=== Some words ===
- allun (path)
- anaborro (buffalo)
- ayir (stone spear)
- corambal (hut)
- eboro (didgeridoo)
- ekolpen (fish spear)
- illpoogee (kangaroo)
- imberbi (edible root)
- kamoomoo (mother)
- limbo cardja (Port Essington)
- looloot (tame dog)
- lurkakie (wild dog)
- murnatt (edible yam)
- nowajuk (father)
- obert (water)
- warranganababoo (white man)

== Country ==
In Tindale's estimation the Iwaidja possessed some 100 square miles (260 km^{2}) of tribal lands. Their centre was at Mountnorris Bay, in the eastern area of the Cobourg Peninsula. Tindale interprets Paul Foelsche's Unalla as a reference to the Iwaidja. Foelsche informed Edward Micklethwaite Curr that:

The country frequented by this tribe extends from Raffles Bay to Port Essington Harbour and thence midway up the Cobourg Peninsula to Popham Bay.

Their neighbours were the Marrgu, Wurrugu, Ilgar, and Garig people. (Note: The last two tribes were mentioned by Foelsche and Tindale.)

The four or five groups were reported to share the same territory, though for Tindale their status as either hordes or independent tribes was undetermined. They were listed as:

- Wonga:ran (in the mainland area immediately opposite Croker Island)
- Ka:ri:k (east of Cape Don)
- Nga:dalwuli (a coastal people lying to the east of the Ka:ri:k)
- Mandu:wit (northwest, and east of the Nga:dalwuli)

However, Macgillivray in the 1850s, described these four tribes under different names:

- Bijenelumbo (from Port Essington to the isthmus)
- Limbakarajia (southern part of the peninsula)
- Limbapyu (northwest area of the peninsula)
- Terrutong (Croker Island and the adjacent mainland)

Macgillivray states that "from the constant intercourse which takes place between these tribes, their affinity of language, and similarity in physical character, manners, and customs, they may be spoken of as one".

== Culture and tradition ==
The Iwaidja share the Warramurrungunji creation belief which exists amongst the various Indigenous peoples of Arnhem Land. Warramurrungunji was a creation spirit who emerged from the sea near the Cobourg Peninsula and came ashore at Croker Island and at Malay Bay. She built a fire to heal herself and when the fire went out, the sea levels rose to their present height, while inland all the rivers and waterholes became filled with fresh water. She left her children at several places throughout the region, assigning each their language and country, some of whom were the Iwaidja ancestors.

Music and art figure strongly in Iwaidja culture. Traditional painting techniques, using natural pigments and chewed-down sticks as brushes, were used in rock paintings and to decorate such things as woven baskets. The oldest existing didgeridoo (or eboro as it is more correctly known) comes from the Port Essington region.

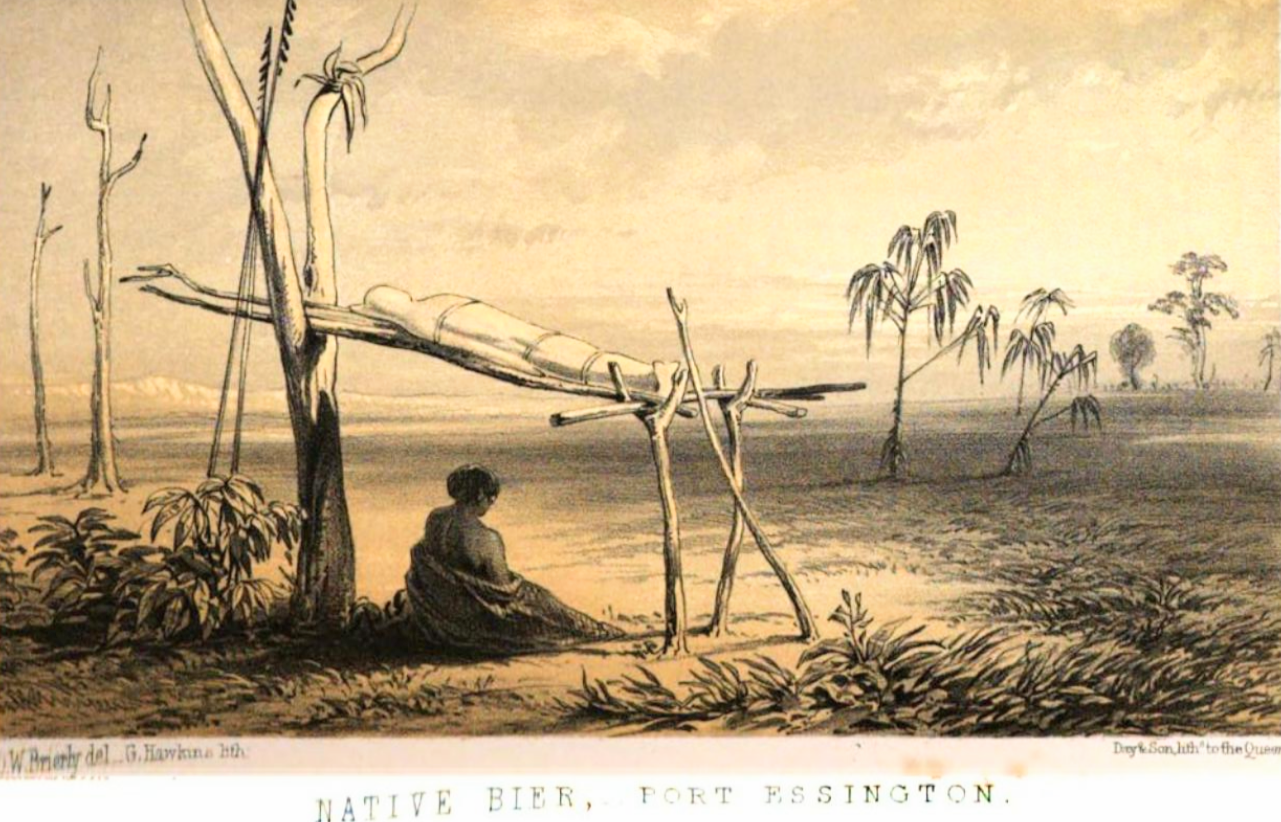
An 1849 sketch of an Iwaidja burial tree by Oswald Brierly

Iwaidja funeral tradition followed the burial tree method that existed in the customs of many other Indigenous peoples of northern Australia and throughout Asia. The corpse was wrapped in bark and placed upon an elevated platform. The weather, birds and ants would remove the flesh and after a couple of months, the remaining bones would be collected by family, painted red and carried as keepsakes before finally being deposited in a tree hollow or sandy ground.

== History of contact ==
=== Foreign exploration ===
The Dutch explored the region in 1636 when Pieter Pieterszoon sailed along the peninsula's coastline, while Abel Tasman also surveyed the area in 1644. In 1705, Maarten van Delft surveyed the bay which is now known as Port Essington.

For the remainder of the 1700s, foreign interest in the region came from the Makassans, who visited the bay annually from Sulawesi to harvest trepang, shark fin, wax and turtle shell. There was hostility between the Indigenous people and the Makassans with some being made to work on their boats and a number being taken to Makassar. The Indigenous people, however, acquired new technologies from the Macassans such as iron tools and dugout canoes.

In 1818, Captain Phillip Parker King in HMS Mermaid began a circumnavigation of Australia and made a detailed survey of the region. He named the Cobourg Peninsula and had a battle with some Indigenous men after he appropriated a human skeleton from a burial site. Killing many people in the tribe.

=== British military outposts ===
In the 1820s, the British Colonial Office became interested in establishing a settlement on Australia's northern coastline in the hope of both facilitating trade with Asia and discouraging the colonial aspirations of the French and the Dutch in the region.

==== Fort Wellington at Raffles Bay ====
Melville Island was initially chosen as the site in 1824 and the short-lived military colony of Fort Dundas was founded there. This was subsequently abandoned in 1828 in favour of Fort Wellington at Raffles Bay on the Cobourg Peninsula. The Iwaidja resisted the military establishment at Raffles Bay and when they wounded a soldier, the commandant, Captain Henry Smyth, ordered an indiscriminate punishment upon the local clan. Up to 30 Iwaidja men, women and children were subsequently killed when soldiers opened fire with guns and an 18-pound cannon on their camp site. Smyth also offered a bounty of £5 for every Aboriginal person captured, which led to at least another killing of Iwaidja women and children by soldiers and armed convicts trying to kidnap people. Smyth was recalled by Governor Darling for these actions and replaced with Captain Collet Barker who managed to improve relations with the Iwaidja. However, Raffles Bay was abandoned shortly after in 1829.

==== Victoria Settlement at Port Essington ====
Despite these failures, the British persisted with their policy of establishing a colonial outpost in the region and in 1838 Port Essington was chosen as a site to create a settlement, and an outpost, officially named Victoria Settlement was established on Garig-Iwaidja land.

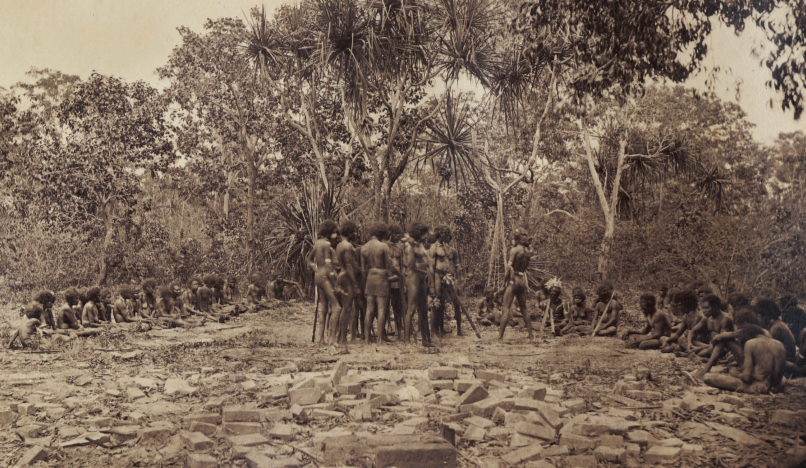
Photograph of a corroboree of Iwaidja at Port Essington taken by Paul Foelsche in 1877

Captain Gordon Bremer and Captain John McArthur arrived with 36 Royal Marines and their families. The Iwaidja were willing to trade their labour for European food and tobacco, and assisted the military in establishing the settlement. A number of Iwaidja learnt to speak very good English from the colonists and a young man named Neinmal became an attendant for McArthur, subsequently sailing with the British to visit Singapore and Sydney. However, when a soldier shot another Aboriginal man for stealing from the settlement, Neinmal, by colluding with the British was held responsible by the family of the dead man and killed according to tribal law.

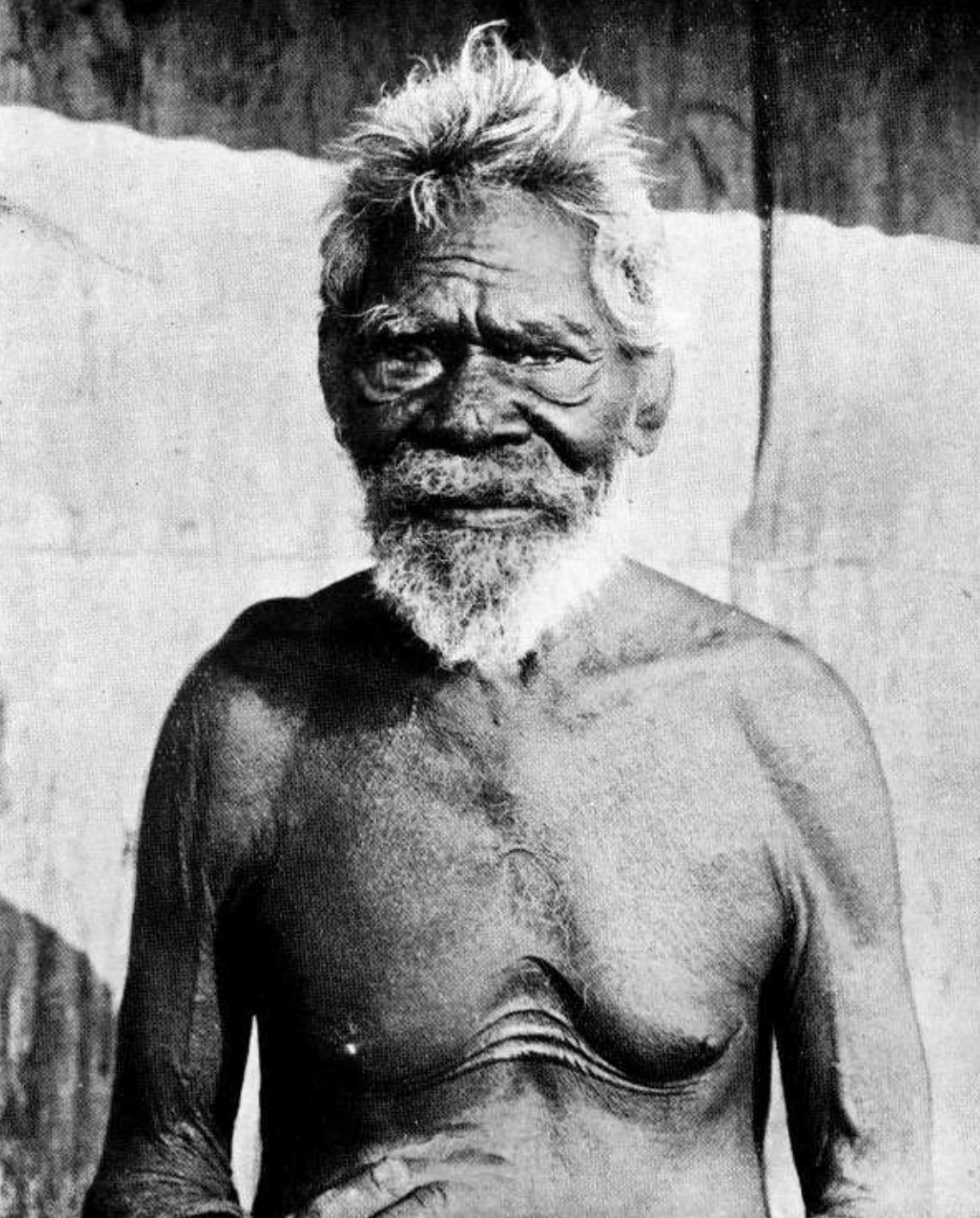
Mildirn a.k.a. Jack Davis

Another young Garig-Iwaidja man named Mildirn (a.k.a. Jack Davis) and his two brothers Aladyin and Mijolk, were kidnapped and taken on board another ship that was visiting Port Essington. They were subsequently abandoned at Hong Kong where they scrounged an existence for around two years before being rescued and returned to their homeland.

In 1845, explorer Ludwig Leichhardt made an overland journey from the east coast of Australia to Port Essington. Garig-Iwaidja people such as Eooanberry, Minorelli, Apirk, Nyuall, Baki Baki, Rambo Rambo and Bill White helped guide and feed Leichhardt's party through the latter stages of their journey toward and through the Cobourg Peninsula. Leichhardt was impressed with their hospitality, English language skills and physique.

The Victoria Settlement also served as the base for the first attempt to convert the Garig-Iwaidja to Christianity. Catholic missionary, Father Angelo Confalonieri learnt their language but failed to convince them to give up their culture. He died from malaria near the settlement in 1848.

Malaria and other diseases killed off around 40 of the settlers and the Victoria Settlement was abandoned by the British in 1849.

=== Buffalo shooters and trepang collectors ===
Macassan trepangers continued to visit the region but a more permanent form of British colonisation did not occur again until 1874 when South Australian landholder, John Lewis, arrived to take up a grazing lease on the peninsula. With financial backing from Philip Levi, Lewis formed the Cobourg Cattle Company.

Despite the recent deaths of the expeditioners Thomas Permien and Edward Borradaile who were probably killed by local Aboriginal men, Lewis found the resident Iwaidja people, such as "Flash Poll", not only hospitable to their arrival but also possessing an excellent knowledge of English that they had learnt thirty years ago from the soldiers stationed there. Lewis also found large numbers of feral water buffalo which were descendant from those introduced into the area from Timor by the British military. He established a buffalo shooting station and the hides were the main source of income for his company. Lewis used the bricks from the ruins of the Victoria Settlement for his establishment and employed the Iwaidja people as labourers whom he paid in rations and tobacco.

In the late 1870s, British colonists such as Edward Oswin Robinson and Francis Cadell established trepang stations in the region. Cadell kidnapped 35 Iwaidja men and women to work as slaves on his trepanging and pearling boats which operated as far as the Torres Strait. In 1879, fourteen Iwaidja, including a man named Wandi Wandi, managed to kill one of Cadell's boat operators in the Torres Strait and escape back home having taken command of the vessel.

Robinson had a trepanging station on Croker Island adjacent to the Cobourg Peninsula which he operated with Thomas Wingfield. In 1880, Wingfield shot dead an Iwaidja man and in retaliation, Wandi Wandi formed a gang and killed Wingfield. Wandi Wandi was later captured and sentenced to 10 years jail with hard labour.

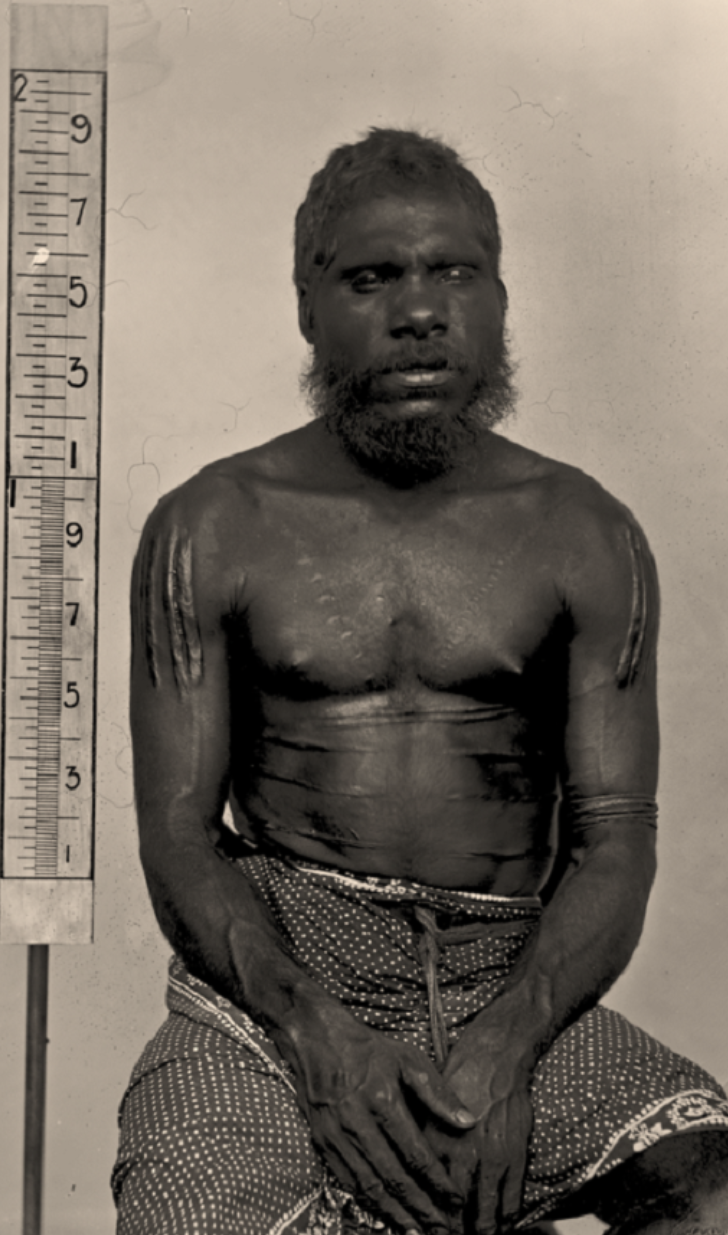
Photograph of Wandi Wandi

After Wingfield's death, Robinson became the manager of the Cobourg Cattle Company. The company also appointed the local head of police, Inspector Paul Foelsche, as its agent in Palmerston. Foelsche took numerous photos of the Iwaidja people when he visited the area. The company folded in 1885, and Robinson established his own buffalo shooting enterprise on the eastern side of the peninsula.

By 1881, the Iwaidja around Port Essington were reduced to a mere 30 members, consisting of 7 men, 12 women, 9 boys and 2 girls. Apart from the kidnappings and killings, Foelsche stated that the community had also been ravaged by smallpox in 1866.

Other buffalo shooters later came to the area, bringing violence to the Iwaidja. In 1890, buffalo shooter Rodney Spencer became irritated with a local Iwaidja man named Manialucum, and shot him dead after having him restrained.

In 1892, six trepangers from the Aru Islands were killed in conflict with another Iwaidja gang formed by Wandi Wandi who had recently been released from prison. Wandi Wandi was again captured and this time sentenced to death. He was hanged in front of around 30 of his kinspeople on a scaffold erected at Malay Bay on his home country.

=== The Iwaidja and the Coopers ===
Joe Cooper (left) with his wife Alice, his son Reuben (in uniform) and his infant daughter c. 1916

While on the Cobourg Peninsula, Robinson employed Joe Cooper as his main buffalo shooter. Cooper was a tough frontiersman, and together with Robinson and other shooters such as Rodney Spencer, they enforced a brutal reign over the local Indigenous population. In 1905, Robinson and Cooper invaded the Tiwi Islands with a force of twenty Iwaidja men whom they had armed as their own personal militia. The Tiwi people referred to these Iwaidja men as Tarula which loosely translates as riflemen. Once established in the Tiwis, Robinson and Cooper expanded the range of their buffalo shooting business. They were called the "Rajahs of Melville" and maintained a cruel control over the Tiwi people until the government forced them to leave in 1916.

Cooper returned to the Cobourg Peninsula where he ran a trepanging business until the 1920s. He had previously married an Iwaidja woman named "Alice" and together they had a son named Reuben who, after receiving an education in Adelaide, maintained a timber milling business at Mountnorris Bay on the eastern side of the peninsula. Reuben employed only Aboriginal people at this mill until his death enforced its closure in 1942. Reuben was also employed by L.A. Buckingham as a manager for his peanut farm on Croker Island during the 1930s where around seventy Aboriginal people were labourers.

=== Aboriginal reserve and mission ===
In 1940 some of the eastern part of the Cobourg Peninsula and Croker Island was declared a reserve for the local Aboriginal people. A Methodist Aboriginal mission was also established at Croker Island in 1940. So called "half-caste" children from the Darwin region were sent there as part of the stolen generations policy until it closed in 1968.

== The Iwaidja in the modern era ==
Many of the descendants of the Iwaidja reside on Croker Island with people from other Indigenous groups such the Kunwinjku and Maung. Those who are descendants of Joe Cooper and his Iwaidja wife are referred to as being of the Murran clan.

In 1969, Reuben Cooper Jnr became the first person from the Northern Territory to play in the Australian Football League.

Aboriginal ownership of Croker Island was granted in 1980, and in 2001 an important native title claim led by Mary Yarmirr on behalf of several clans of Iwaidja descendants, aimed to obtain rights over the surrounding sea and sea-bed. The case established that traditional owners have non-exclusive native title of the sea and sea-bed.

== Notable people ==
- Mildirn - a respected elder from the colonial period
- Flash Poll - well-known female Iwaidja identity from the colonial period
- Wandi Wandi - a resistance leader and outlaw
- Reuben Cooper - famous Northern Territory identity of the 1920s
- Reuben Cooper Jnr - pioneering VFL player

== Sources ==
- Dixon, Robert M. W. (2002). Australian Languages: Their Nature and Development. Vol. 1. Cambridge University Press. ISBN 978-0-521-47378-1.
- Earl, G. Windsor (1846). "On the Aboriginal Tribes of the Northern Coast of Australia". The Journal of the Royal Geographical Society of London. 16: 239–251. doi:10.2307/1798232. JSTOR 1798232.
- Earl, G. Windsor (1853). The native races of the Indian Archipelago: Papuans (PDF). London: H. Bailliere – via Internet Archive.
- Evans, Nicholas (1998). "Iwaidja mutation and its origins". In Siewierska, Anna; Song, Jae Jung (eds.). Case, Typology and Grammar: In honor of Barry J. Blake. John Benjamins Publishing Company. pp. 115–149. ISBN 978-9-027-22937-3.
- Foelsche, Paul (1886). "Raffles Bay: The Unalla Tribe" (PDF). In Curr, Edward Micklethwaite (ed.). The Australian race: its origin, languages, customs, place of landing in Australia and the routes by which it spread itself over the continent. Vol. 1. Melbourne: J. Ferres. pp. 270–275 – via Internet Archive.
- Foelsche, Paul (1895). "On the Manners, Customs, &c., of some Tribes of the Aborigines, in the neighbourhood of Port Darwin and the West Coast of the Gulf of Carpentaria, North Australia". Journal of the Anthropological Institute of Great Britain and Ireland. 24: 190–198. JSTOR 2842215.
- Hart, C. W. (July 1930). "The Tiwi of Melville and Bathurst Islands". Oceania. 1 (2): 167–180. doi:10.1002/j.1834-4461.1930.tb01643.x. JSTOR 40327319.
- Jennison, J. C. (1927). "Notes on the language of the Elcho Island aborigines". Transactions of the Royal Society of South Australia. 51: 177–192 – via BHL.
- Spencer, Baldwin (1914). Native tribes of the Northern Territory of Australia (PDF). London: Macmillan Publishers – via Internet Archive.
- Tindale, Norman Barnett (1974). "Iwaidja (NT)". Aboriginal Tribes of Australia: Their Terrain, Environmental Controls, Distribution, Limits, and Proper Names. Australian National University. ISBN 978-0-708-10741-6. Archived from the original on 20 March 2020.
