= Sir George Hope Islands =

- Location within Northern Territory

Geography
- Coordinates: 11°33′S 132°13′E

Administration
- Australia

The Sir George Hope Islands are a group of islands lying southwest of the Cobourg Peninsula in the Northern Territory of Australia.

== Name ==
The name was given to the islands by the navigator and explorer Phillip Parker King who sailed into the area on 28 April 1818. King named them in honour of the then Vice admiral Sir George Hope.

== Number and Location ==
The Sir George Hope Islands are five in number, the largerst being Greenhill Island, The others are Wangoindjung, Warldagawaji, Morse and Wunmiyi, strung out on an east west axis for a distance of approximately 14 miles.

== Protected area status ==
The Sir George Hope Islands are located within the Garig Gunak Barlu Marine Park.

== Sources ==
- Eussen, Dick (2008). Fishing and Camping Guide to Northern Territory. Australian Fishing Network. ISBN 978-1-865-13151-1.
- King, Phillip Parker (2012) [First published 1827]. Narrative of a Survey of the Intertropical and Western Coasts of Australia, Performed Between the Years 1818 and 1822: With an Appendix Containing Various Subjects Relating to Hydrography and Natural History. Cambridge University Press. ISBN 978-1-108-04596-4.
- North, West and South Coasts of Australia. National Geospatial-Intelligence Agency. 2004. ISBN 978-1-577-85655-9.
