= Reuben Cooper =

Australian rules footballer (born 1951)

Personal information
- Born: 14 August 1951 (age 75)

Playing career
Years	Club	Games (Goals)
1969	South Melbourne	2 (0)
- Darwin

Representative team honours
Years	Team	Games (Goals)
- Northern Territory

Coaching career
Years	Club	Games (W–L–D)
1986–87	Nightcliff	

Reuben Cooper (born 14 August 1951) is a former Australian rules football player and coach. He was the first Northern Territorian in history to play in the Australian Football League, having debuted for South Melbourne in 1969.

== Biography ==
Cooper, an indigenous Australian was born into a footballing family, his father Ron who played football with the Buffaloes in the NTFL. His great grandfather Robert Joel "Joe" Cooper was a buffalo shooter Melville Island and was married a Iwaidja woman named Alice. Joe sent Reuben's grandfather, Reuben Cooper Snr to St Peter's College, Adelaide after which he returned to introduced the sport to Darwin in 1915, Reuben Snr was the first "coloured" player to play in the Darwin league and his wife.

== Playing career ==
In 1968 Cooper moved to Melbourne to play for South Melbourne but was unable to play for the Swans immediately due to Northern Territory transfer rules. He spent the 1968 season playing suburban football in Melbourne.

He made his league debut during the 1969 VFL season as a seventeen-year-old, becoming the first player from the Northern Territory to play in the VFL.

After returning to Darwin, he played for Darwin Football Club in the Northern Territory Football League (NTFL). He was best on ground in the Buffaloes' 1970/71 grand final-winning team.

== Coaching career ==
Cooper was coach of NTFL club Nightcliff for the 1986/87 season.
