= Fort Dundas =

British settlement in Australia

Coordinates: 11°24′18″S 130°25′02″E

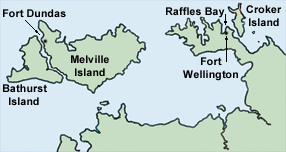
Location of Fort Dundas on Melville Island.

Fort Dundas was a short-lived British settlement on Melville Island between 1824 and 1828 in what is now the Northern Territory of Australia. It was the first of four British settlement attempts in northern Australia before Goyder's survey and establishment of Palmerston, now known as Darwin. The three later attempts were at Fort Wellington, Port Essington and Escape Cliffs.

== Establishment ==
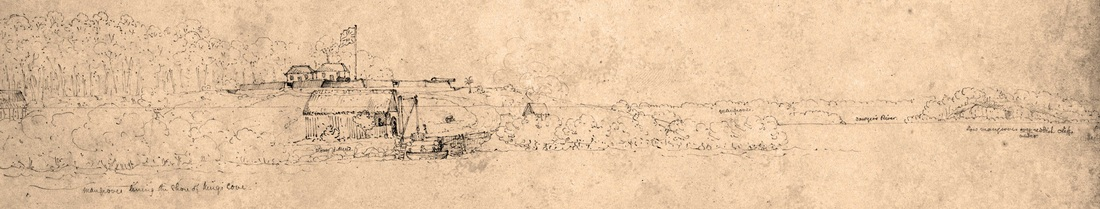
Sketch of Fort Dundas by John Septimus Roe, 1 November 1824

Captain J. J. Gordon Bremer set sail on HMS Tamar from Port Jackson on the 24 August 1824 to colonise the northern part of Australia. His ship was accompanied by HMS Lady Nelson, and Countess of Harcourt. The ships transported Captain Maurie Barlow, Lieutenant John Septimus Roe, Lieutenant Everard and 23 men of the 3rd Regiment, a subaltern and 26 men of the Royal Marine, a surgeon, three commissariat workers, three free men seeking adventure and 44 convicts.

The construction of a settlement began upon arrival on 27 September 1824. It was officially proclaimed on 21 October 1824, on Trafalgar Day. It was named Fort Dundas and was named after Robert Dundas, the First Lord of the Admiralty.

The intention was to commence and develop trade with the Malays. During the first two years, the settlers never saw a Malay. Furthermore, the settlers had not been able to penetrate more than 32 kilometres (20 mi) into the island's interior "due to the hostility of the natives – being in the most savage state of barbarism, and all attempts to conciliate them proving abortive"; such was the report to the British people. The establishment of the settlement caused the border of New South Wales to be moved west from the 135th meridian to the Western Australian border (129th meridian).

Captain Bremer was relieved by a Scot, Major John Campbell in 1827. Campbell's party was the first to include women. The first European marriage in the Northern Territory occurred shortly after at the fort. In his party was the wife of Lieutenant Hicks, who died shortly after.

== Tiwi resistance ==
The Tiwi put up strong resistance to the new settlers on their land.

There was no contact between the colonisers and the indigenous people of the Tiwi Islands, the Tiwi people, during the first few weeks of the settlement. Bremer noted that the first recorded meetings occurred on 25 October 1824. Exploring a small river on Bathurst Island across the strait from the settlement, Bremer came into contact with a party of ten Tiwi men. Bremer described them as initially defensive and aggressive, calming down upon the presentation of gifts:

After some time they gained confidence and came so near as to take a handkerchief and other trifles we put towards them on an oar... having given them all the boat afforded I left them apparently well satisfied.

On the same day two convicts were seized but not injured. The Tiwi retreated when troops appeared on the scene, taking the convicts’ axes with them. Bremer suspected the Islanders had been watching the settlements for some time and saw the valuable metal and tools.

Attacks on the fort became regular, "sometimes daily". Two people were speared to death including the fort's surgeon, Dr Gold. He was discovered with 31 spear wounds. Seven spear heads remained in his body. One had passed through his head "from ear to ear". The storekeeper John Green had 17 spear wounds and his skull was smashed open.

== Abandonment ==
Bad relations with the Tiwi people, tropical storms, isolation and low food and medical supplies caused Campbell to request that the post be closed and the garrison taken away from "this vile island". He was relieved by Captain Humphrey Hartley, but orders were received shortly after to abandon the fort in late 1828. The last of the settlers left by April 1829. One soldier could not be found and was left behind, with his wife and family sailing without him.

South Australian governor Lord Kintore later declared Bremer's selection of Fort Dundas as ill-suited and "never satisfactorily explained".

== Excavations and recent history ==
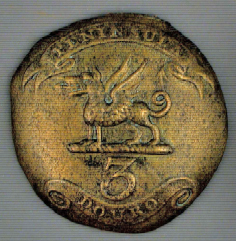
3rd Regiment Shako Plate from Fort Dundas

Remnants of the fort were visible in 1895, nearly 70 years after the fort's closure. The moat and stonework from a building, thought to be a church, were present as were grave sites. There were several visitors to the site in the early 1900s, who observed the remains of earthworks, part of a stone wharf, a building, and retaining walls, and noted that the once-cleared hillside had regenerated.

A commemoration event was held in Darwin in 1924, a century after the establishment of the fort. In 1938 relics of uniforms worn at Fort Dundas were found during a medical survey of Melville Island. They were donated to the Mitchell Library at the University of Sydney in 1972. In 1939, original stones were retrieved from Fort Dundas and used to construct a memorial to the early settlement at Darwin's garrison which was unveiled in 1945. Also in 1939, mobile patrol units were established at the fort aimed at preventing trespassing on Aboriginal reserves.

A 49-day excavation was completed in 1975, which mapped and documented the condition of site. Artefacts were found including a glass bottle and a 3rd Regiment brass badge or 'Shako Plate' which are now held at the Museum and Art Gallery of the Northern Territory in Fannie Bay in Darwin. The final report recommended an ongoing research program of the site.

== See also ==
- Raffles Bay
- Port Essington
- Escape Cliffs
