= Port Essington =

Location and former settlement in Northern Territory, Australia

Coordinates: 11°21′38″S 132°09′12″E

Port Essington, Northern Territory

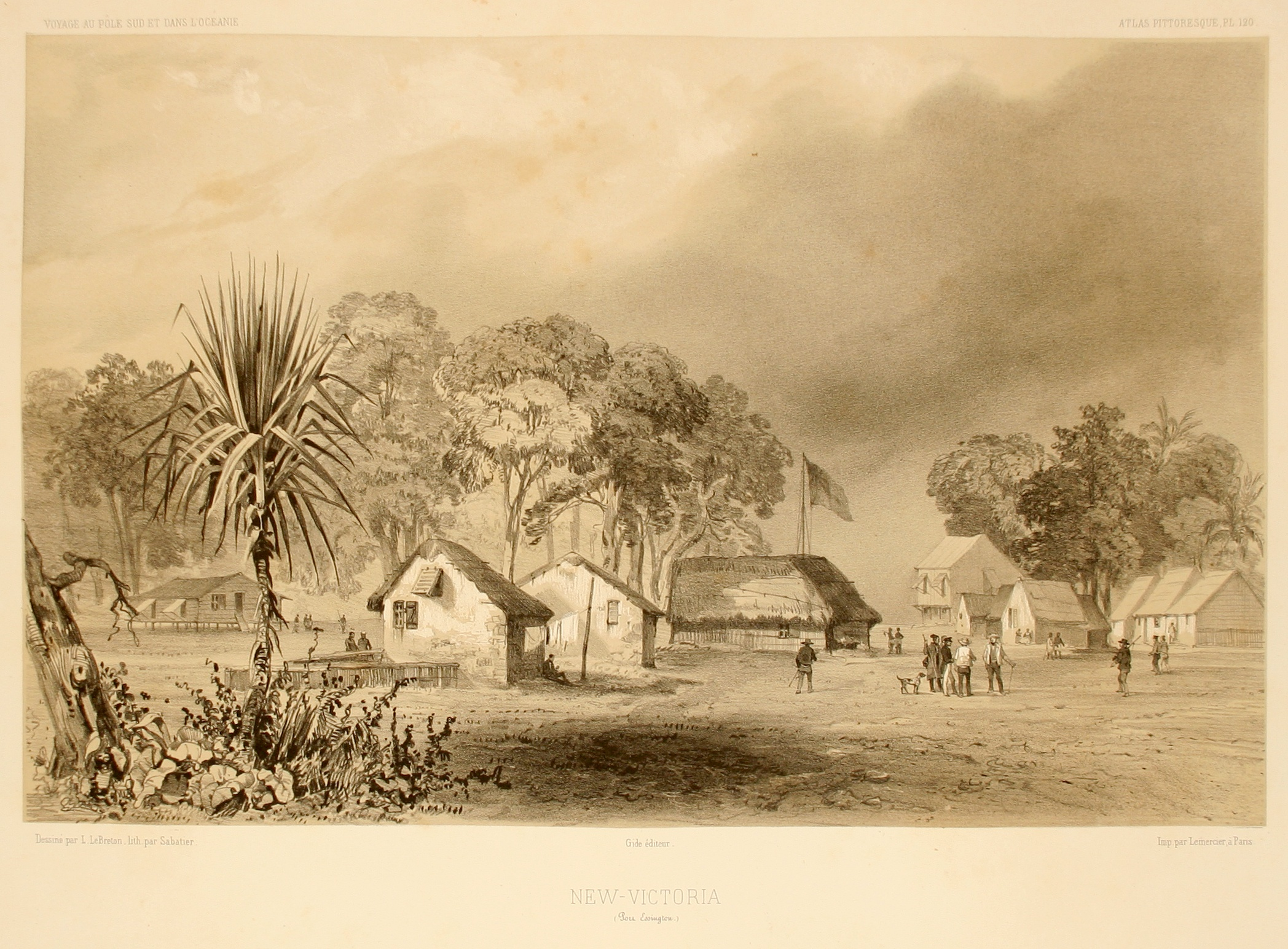
New Victoria in 1839. Lithograph from Voyage au Pôle Sud et en Océanie by Jules Dumont d'Urville

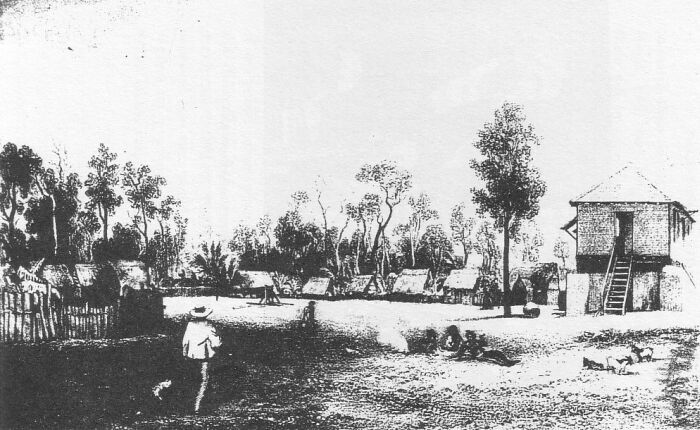
Port Essington as illustrated in Ludwig Leichhardt's account of his expedition

Port Essington (Iwaidja language: Limbo Cardja) is an inlet and historic site located on the Cobourg Peninsula in the Garig Gunak Barlu National Park in Australia's Northern Territory. It was the site of an early attempt at British settlement, but now exists only as a remote series of ruins.

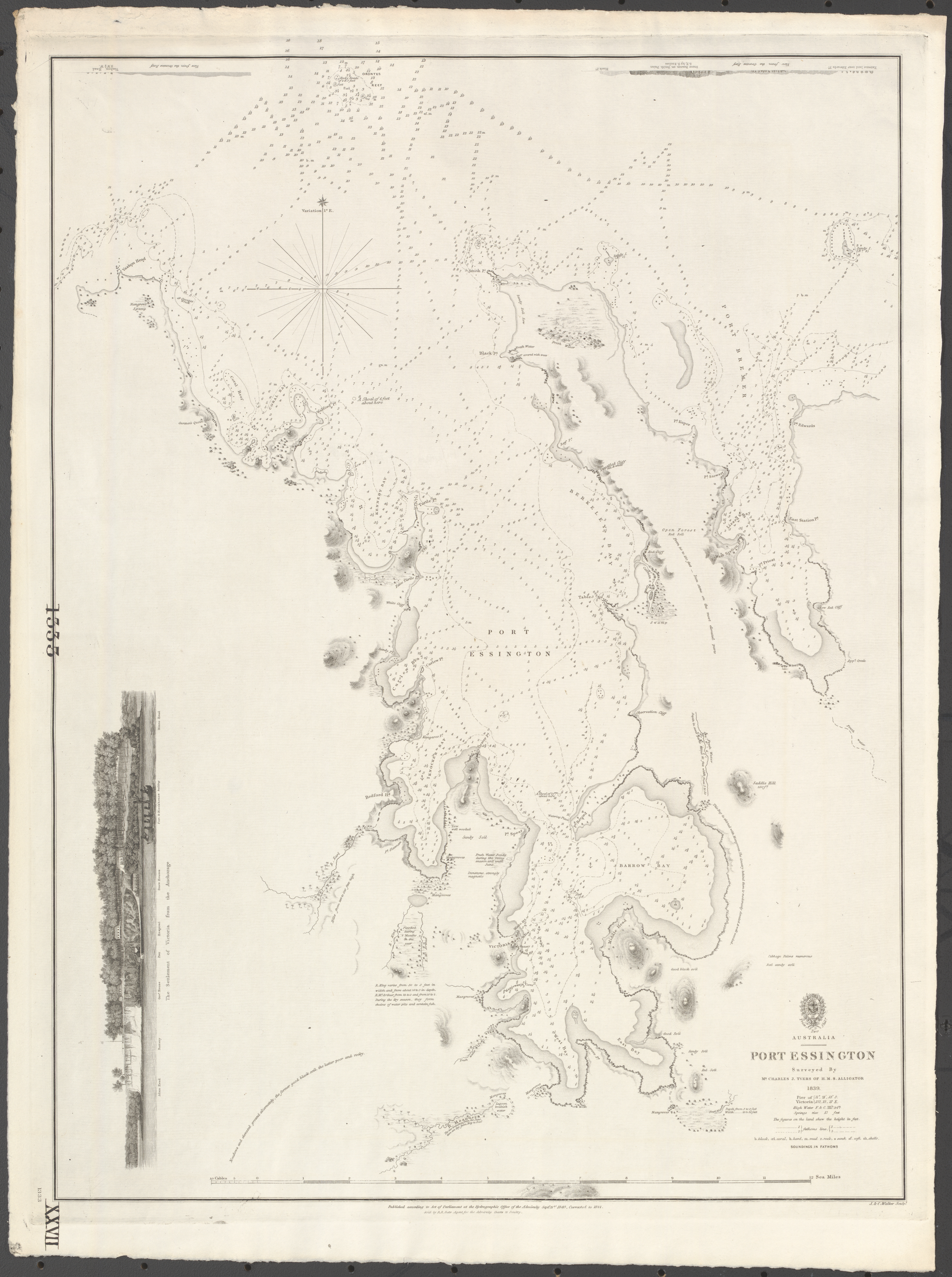
Nautical Chart of Port Essington, showing the Victoria settlement, surveyed by Charles Tyers in 1839

== Indigenous Australians ==
Port Essington and the surrounding area has been the country of the Garig-Iwaidja group of people and their ancestors for at least the past 40,000 years.

== Dutch exploration ==
In 1705, the Dutch East India Company ordered Captain Maarten van Delft to prepare a fleet of three vessels to make an expedition from the East Indies to the northern coast of New Holland (Australia). After remaining three months on the Tiwi Islands, he surveyed some of the mainland, naming Maarten Van Delft Bay after himself. This bay is now known as Port Essington.

== Makassan interest ==
For the remainder of the 18th century, foreign interest in the region came from the Makassans, who visited the bay annually from Sulawesi to harvest trepang, shark fin, wax and turtle shell. There was hostility between the Indigenous people and the Makassans with some being made to work on their boats and a number being taken to Makassar. The Indigenous people, however, acquired new technologies from the Macassans such as iron tools.

== British exploration ==
Port Essington was named on 23 April 1818 by Phillip Parker King in HMS Mermaid 'as a tribute of my respect for the memory of my lamented friend, Vice-Admiral Sir William Essington', who was in command of Triumph at the battle of Camperdown in October 1797.

King was conducting a detailed circumnavigation of Australia, and whilst surveying Port Essington, he decided to remove a skeleton from an Aboriginal burial site. This caused a skirmish with the resident Iwaidja-Garig people, and King's vessel was showered with spears and stones. His crew fired several rounds but no casualties were observed.

== The Victoria settlement ==
=== Background ===
In the 1820s, the British Colonial Office became interested in establishing a settlement on Australia's northern coastline in the hope of both facilitating trade with Asia and discouraging the colonial aspirations of the French and the Dutch in the region.

Port Essington and Melville Island were proposed as the first such settlements, but the former was initially passed over due to a lack of fresh water. Captain Gordon Bremer took possession of Melville Island in September 1824 and founded the short-lived colony of Fort Dundas. This was subsequently abandoned in 1828 in favour of Fort Wellington at nearby Raffles Bay. However, this too was abandoned in 1829.

=== Establishment of the settlement ===
Despite these failures, the British persisted with their policy of establishing a colonial outpost in the region and in 1838 Port Essington was revisited as a site to create a settlement. Again, Captain Gordon Bremer was chosen to lead the initiative and as a result, an outpost, officially named Victoria Settlement after the young Queen Victoria, but popularly known as Port Essington, was established.

It was surveyed by Charles Tyers in 1839 and consisted of 24 houses and a hospital. A description of the harbour and settlement was communicated to the Royal Geographical Society, London, in 1839.

On 24 August 1839 the only play ever staged in Port Essington was performed, the 1797 comedy in five acts Cheap Living by Frederick Reynolds. The set and costume design was by Owen Stanley (1811–1850). The play was performed again in 2010 with a grant from the Government of the Northern Territory, with Tom Pauling, Administrator of the Northern Territory, acting as narrator in the play.

While the British government intended to establish Port Essington as a major trading port, along the lines of Singapore, the new settlement suffered from the same adverse conditions that had previously plagued Fort Dundas and Fort Wellington. The settlement lacked resources and supplies and skilled labour. While some prefabricated buildings were brought from Sydney, many had to be built with what materials could be found in the area, and due to the unskilled nature of the builders, many of these were of poor quality. Disease was also rampant among the small population, and living conditions were poor. Consequently, it struggled to attract settlers, and the post was much-disliked by the troops stationed there.

A local Aboriginal leader Medlone, also known as Jack Davis, acted as a messenger and manager for relations with the local Aboriginal people.

=== Setbacks ===
Port Essington suffered a further setback when the settlement was demolished by a cyclone on 25 November 1839. The cyclone killed twelve people, drove the ship HMS Pelorus aground, and caused a 3.2 metre storm surge. The settlement was rebuilt afterwards, with some stone and brick buildings, due to the assistance of a brick maker who had been shipwrecked during the storm.

Despite these setbacks, there was still widespread hope that Port Essington might be able to break the curse, as evidenced by Ludwig Leichhardt's 1844/1845 expedition. The New South Wales government had hoped to establish a direct line of communication with Asia, India and the Pacific, and supported Leichhardt's journey, which successfully charted an overland route between Moreton Bay (now Brisbane) and Port Essington.

A detailed map of Ludwig Leichhardt's route in Australia from Moreton Bay to Port Essington (1844 & 1845), from his Original Map, adjusted and drawn... by John Arrowsmith was ranked #8 in the ‘Top 150: Documenting Queensland’ exhibition when it toured to venues around Queensland from February 2009 to April 2010. The exhibition was part of Queensland State Archives’ events and exhibition program which contributed to the state’s Q150 celebrations, marking the 150th anniversary of the separation of Queensland from New South Wales.

In 1844, a group of convicts, which included trained masons and quarry men among them, was stationed at Port Essington. They were able to build a hospital of some quality at a beacon. Another arrival in 1844, late in the year, were Lieutenant George Lambrick and his was Emma Lambrick who had sailed there on the convict ship Cadet; Emma Lambrick would soon be the first European woman to die there.

In 1846 Father Angelo Confalonieri made a decision to found a Catholic mission nearby, in an attempt to convert the local population. He had some success, converting around 400 people, but he died of fever in 1848, and the mission died with him.

Port Essington was still failing to attract settlers, and it was becoming increasingly clear both that the 1844 works had come too late, and that the settlement was unsustainable. Visiting the settlement in December 1848, soon before its closure, British scientist Thomas Huxley wrote that Port Essington was "most wretched, the climate the most unhealthy, the human beings the most uncomfortable and houses in a condition most decayed and rotten".

=== Abandonment ===
Finally, in 1849, Port Essington was, like the two previous attempts, abandoned. The demise of the settlement saw the end of British attempts at occupying the north coast. There would be one further unsuccessful attempt, by the Government of South Australia and Frederick Henry Litchfield in 1864, at Escape Cliffs (also known as Palmerston) near the mouth of the Adelaide River, before the first permanent settlement was established at Darwin (also initially known as Palmerston), in 1869.

The ruins of Port Essington still exist today, and while access is difficult, it is possible to do so by several means. It is possible to fly in through tours that can be arranged in Darwin, or to travel to the area alone by four-wheel drive or boat – although, as the ruins lie on Aboriginal land, a permit must be obtained first. Cabins and some camping sites are available at Black Point Ranger Station.

The Australian industrialist Essington Lewis was named after Port Essington.
