= Dundas Strait =

- Map showing the layout of Van Diemen Gulf with the Dundas Strait on the north, connecting it with the Timor Sea.

- Location within Northern Territory
- Coordinates: 11.3333°S 131.5833°E
- Type: Strait
- Etymology: Henry Dundas, 1st Viscount Melville
- Basin countries: Australia
- Max. width: 15 nautical miles (28 km; 17 mi)

Dundas Strait is a sea passage in the Northern Territory of Australia located between Melville Island and the Cobourg Peninsula. It connects the Timor Sea to the Van Diemen Gulf.
