= Robert Joel Cooper =

Australian buffalo hunter (1860–1936)

Joe Cooper mounted on horse, 1912

Joe, Alice and Reuben Cooper, c.1916

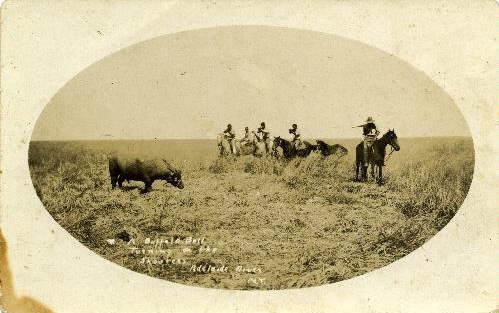
Buffalo turning on shooter, believed to be Joe Cooper.

Robert Joel Cooper (29 February 1860 – 7 August 1936), better known as Joe Cooper, was an Australian buffalo hunter in the Northern Territory who spent much of his life on Melville Island (Yermalner).

He was also known as 'Jokupper', ‘white Rajah of Melville Island' and 'The king of Melville Island.

== Early life ==
Joe Cooper was born in 1860 at Fairview, a property near Riverton in South Australia, he was the son of George and Harriet Cooper.

As a young man, between 1878 and 1881, he first travelled to the Northern Territory as a drover alongside his brother George Henry (Harry). They overlanded horses there and, for the next several years, worked there in the timber industry and began buffalo shooting on the Cobourg Peninsula and surrounding areas.

== Buffalo shooter ==
In May 1893 Cooper and Harry moved to Melville Island (Yermalner) alongside Edward Oswin Robinson who had taken a pastoral lease there. Robinson left soon after, leaving Cooper in charge as manager. Cooper, finding thousands of buffalo there to shoot, established a camp there in 1895. The presence of Cooper and his team was not harmonious and several Tiwi people were shot and Cooper and another employee Barney Flynn were speared. By the end of 1896 Cooper and his team shot 4,644 buffaloes on the Island. Due to the Tiwi resistatnce, Robinson was forced to withdraw Cooper and his team by the end of 1896.

== Armed invasion of Melville Island ==
Cooper returned to the Coburg Peninsula with four Tiwi people that he had kidnapped while exiting the islands. Over the following years, he learned the Tiwi language from them and organised a plan to re-enter Melville Island. In 1905, Cooper assembled an armed force which included twenty Iwaidja men from the mainland as well as the four Tiwi men and women whom he had held captive to act his emissaries. On their return to Melville Island, Tiwi man Samuel Ingeruintamirri was sent ashore first to distribute goods and explain Coopers return; this was essential to their reentry.

To the Tiwi, this was a foreign invasion, as Greg Tjipalilpwaingi Ulungura remembered:

Joe Cooper was here and bring a lotta people from mainland. From mainland, everywhere. From Cape Don, from everywhere there. Cape Don mob, Iwaidja. Iwaidja people he brought here, Iwaidja people. Iwaidja people he brought here. They didn't understand everything, these people here, all Aboriginal people - Tiwi people, they never understand.

— Greg Tjipalilpwaingi Ulungura, as quoted in "People got a gun", 2003

The Iwaidja formed the nucleus of the buffalo shooting team and were armed; this intimidated the Tiwi. Cooper then stayed on for 10 years, shooting up to 1,000 buffalo a year, for their hides and horns. These were shipped to Darwin on his lugger 'Buffalo' which was also used as a charter for government departments and officials. He also cut cypress pine and fished for trepang.

In 1906 Cooper received a visit from German physical anthropologist Hermann Klaatsch who described him as a typical adventurer of the bush who had "a friendly relationship with the blacks".

In 1907 Cooper's brother Harry died on the Island and, there are conflicting stories of his death with some stories, perhaps promoted by Cooper, stating that he was speared to death by the Tiwi or died in the course of buffalo shooting. Despite this his listed cause of death was syphilis and this is supported by the obituaries published at the time of his death stating that he died suddenly of an illness.

In 1910 he befriended Francis Xavier Gsell, who established a mission on the nearby Bathurst Island (Nguyu). He also befriended the Commonwealth Administrator of the Northern Territory John Anderson Gilruth and biologist and anthropologist Walter Baldwin Spencer. Spencer stayed with Cooper in 1911 and 1912 while studying the Tiwi people; the results of this research are published in Wanderings in Wild Australia (1928). After Spencer's 1911 visit he described Cooper as:

[A] man equally at home at sea and in the bush, and a mighty hunter ... [who] ... is venerated as a sort of Rajah.

— Walter Baldwin Spencer, The Argus, 24 August 1911

It is perhaps based on these friendships that Cooper was made an honorary sub-protector of Aborigines in 1911 and the authorities began sending Aboriginal people from other parts of the Northern Territory who were addicted to alcohol or opium to Yermalner. People were also sent to Nguyu.

Cooper resigned from his position as sub-protector in November 1914 following allegations of cruelty towards Aboriginal people and the use of intimidating practices by his armed 'bodyguards' (a group of Iwaidja) that included his step-son Ted (who was said to have been involved in several murders). These allegations were made by sawmiller Sam Green who witnessed Cooper remove an Aboriginal woman, Mary Damil, from his camp with a strap around her neck and removed her from a room using it. This incident was also witnessed by Richard Webb who signed a statement saying:

Cooper entering the house and taking Mary by force ... said "Where are you going to have this, on your legs or on your neck?" He twisted a strap around her neck and forced her out of the room. I told him I would let the matter be known ... What I am up against is the cruelty. I think Cooper used unnecessary violence and cruelty. If I had not held myself together I think I would have gone for him.

— Richard Webb, Signed statement made by R. Webb as quoted by "People got a gun", 2003

== Removal of Cooper from Melville Island ==
After Cooper's resignation he was replaced by Rev. Regis Courbon and all non-Tiwi people were returned to the mainland by order of the Department of External Affairs.

Cooper also left Yermalner and became associated with several pastoral leases in the Top End and in 1921 he was trepanging in Trepang Bay.

== Death ==
Cooper died in Darwin on 7 August 1936 and, on his death, he was reported to have killed over 100,000 buffalos.

== Family ==
Cooper was in a relationship an Iwaidja woman, named Alice, who, although not legally married, was to all intents and purposes his wife and was treated as such. They had three children together; two daughters, Josephine and Ethel, and a son named Reuben. Josephine died at the age of 14 and Ethel married a part-Aboriginal man named William McLennan. Ethel and William had five children together with Ethel dying in childbirth in 1937. Reuben, was educated in Adelaide, but was rejected from colonial society as a "half-caste" when he returned to Darwin. He then joined his father as a buffalo shooter and timber miller on the Cobourg Peninsula. Reuben died in 1942.

Alice also had a son from an earlier relationship named Ted and he later worked for Joe Cooper.

== Legacy ==
It is believed that the character of Ned Krater, in Xavier Herbert's novel Capricornia (1938) is based on Cooper and Norman Shillingsworth on his son Reuben although the later is more contested.

Cooper is the great-grandfather of footballer Reuben Cooper Jnr.

The descendants of Joe Cooper and his Aboriginal wife, Alice, are now referred to as the Murran clan of the Iwaidja-Arrarrkbi people.
