= Fort Wellington, Australia =

Coordinates: 11°14′42″S 132°25′10″E

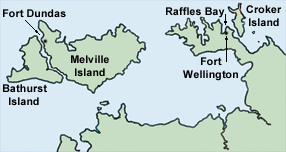
Location of Raffles Bay and Fort Wellington

Fort Wellington was the name of a short-lived British settlement established in 1827 at Raffles Bay, on the northern side of the Cobourg Peninsula of what is now the Northern Territory of Australia, which was abandoned in 1829. It was the second of a series of four such abortive settlement attempts in Australia's Top End, the first being Fort Dundas (1824–1828) on Melville Island, the third Fort Victoria or Victoria Settlement, at Port Essington (1838–1849) on the Cobourg Peninsula, and the fourth at Escape Cliffs (1864–1867) near the mouth of the Adelaide River.

== History ==
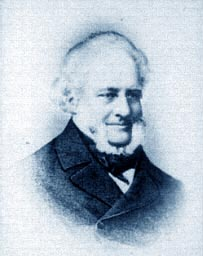
James Stirling established Fort Wellington in 1827

Following unsatisfactory reports of the Fort Dundas settlement, Captain James Stirling was sent from Sydney in May 1827 aboard HMS Success and the Mary Elizabeth to establish a new settlement east of Melville Island. On 18 June 1827 he took formal possession of Raffles Bay where he landed an establishment force, with their supplies, on the eastern shore and named the outpost Fort Wellington. The force comprised Commandant Captain H. G. Smyth and 30 soldiers from the 39th Regiment, 14 marines, a surgeon, storekeeper and 22 convicts.

From the beginning the settlement suffered from diseases such as scurvy, attacks by hostile Aborigines, and the logistical problems arising from its isolation. The hoped for trade with the East Indies failed to eventuate. Despite the arrival In September 1828 of Captain Collet Barker as the new Commandant, who established better relations with the local Aborigines, the settlement was abandoned in August 1829.

== See also ==
- Fort Dundas (1824–1828)
- Port Essington (1838–1849)
- Escape Cliffs (1864–1867)
