= George Windsor Earl =

British ethnographer (1813–1865)

George Samuel Windsor Earl
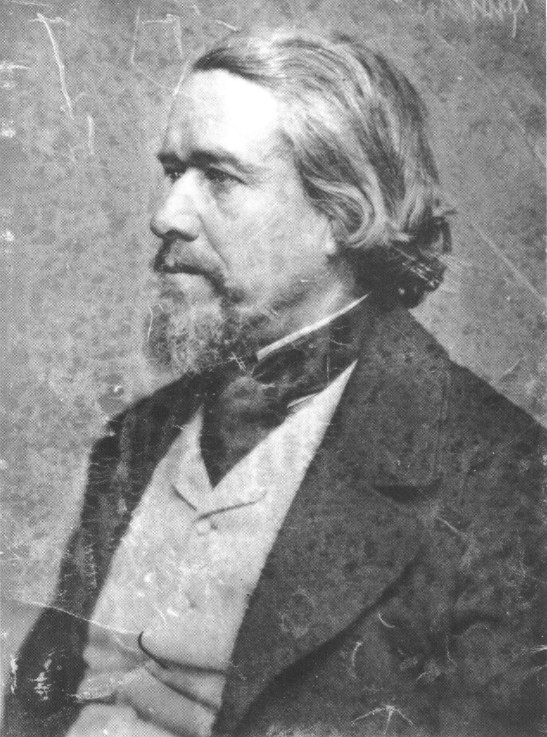
- Born: George Samuel Windsor Earl; 10 February 1813; Hampstead, London
- Died: 9 August 1865 (aged 52) at sea, off Penang
- Resting place: Old Protestant Cemetery, George Town
- Occupation: colonial administrator
- Years active: 1832 - 1865
- Known for: coined the term "Indonesia"

George Windsor Earl (10 February 1813 – 9 August 1865) was an English navigator, colonial administrator, and author of works on the Indonesian Archipelago. He coined the term 'Indu-nesian', later adopted as the name for Indonesia. The word's etymology derives from the Greek term 'nesos,' (νῆσος) meaning 'island,' combined with 'India.'

== Biography ==
Earl was born in London in 1813. He travelled to India after becoming a midshipman at age 14, then joined the colonists in Western Australia in 1830. In 1832 he resumed his nautical career, working between Batavia and Singapore, and gained the command of a trading ship. He returned to England and became involved in a scheme to colonise the North of Australia, leaving for Port Essington in 1838, but by 1845 the hardships and lack of success of the North Australia Expedition had exhausted him. He made a later venture to the region, promoting cotton and trade, with a similar result. From 1855 until his death he held a variety of official administrative positions in the region, his last post was at Penang.

Earl died on a sea journey to England in 1865, and is buried at the Old Protestant Cemetery, George Town, Penang, in present-day Malaysia.

== Works ==
G. W. Earl, who wrote on a diverse range of interests, was regarded as an authority on hydrography and a source of anthropological information on the peoples of the region. His works include papers and books, and a number of pamphlets and other material relating to proposed ventures in Australia. His first major publications were The Eastern Seas or Voyages and Adventures in the Indian Archipelago 1832-33-34... (London, 1837), and Sailing directions for the Arafura Sea, 1839, a translation from Dutch narratives of Dirk Hendrik Kolff and others. The records of his observations of deep-sea channels were used by Charles Darwin and Alfred Russel Wallace when studying the disjuncts in the bio-geographic distribution of the region. In particular, his pamphlet On the Physical Geography of South-Eastern Asia and Australia, published in 1845, described how shallow seas connected islands on the west (Sumatra, Java, etc.) with the Asian continent and with similar wildlife, and islands on the east such as New Guinea were connected to Australia and were characterised by the presence of marsupials. This formed the inspiration for Alfred Russel Wallace to propose the faunal boundary line now known as the Wallace Line. He published a paper in 1850 that invented the term 'Indu-nesians', for a quaint racial classification, derived from the Greek for India and islands.

He published a seminal anthropological reference on the Papuan peoples, compiled from first-hand accounts of other visitors to the region, though his direct contact or exploration of the land is unrecorded and seems unlikely. This work, The native races of the Indian Archipelago: Papuans, was the first in a projected series, further volumes on 'Malayu-Polynesians', Australians, and Moluccans were never realised. Amongst the sources for the material was information Earl obtained from interviews with Owen Stanley and Dumont d'Urville. The volume functioned as a standard reference on the people until the twentieth century, though based on a treatment as a racial classification, was noted for its focus on research from the field. The book included papers on racial types written in 1845, these were encouraged and edited by James Richardson Logan and published in Journal of the Indian Archipelago and Eastern Asia.

== Family ==
George William Samuel Earl was born on 10 February 1832 in Hampstead, Middlesex, England to Percy William Earl (1771–1827), a ship's captain and Elizabeth née Sharp (c1778-1874). His sister, Elizabeth (1817–1890) married John Loftus Hartwell, an Assistant-Surgeon in the army; his elder brother Percy William Earl (1811–1846) was also a naturalist.

George married Clara Siborne on 4 April 1846; they had a daughter Elizabeth Christiana Fernhill Earl (1847–1923) who married William John Alt (1840–1908) a successful Japanese merchant.

George's granddaughter Anne 'Nancy' Alt (1873–1959) was the mother of Lt. Gen. Sir Frederick 'Boy' Browning.
