= Garig Gunak Barlu National Park =

National park in the Northern Territory, Australia

- IUCN category II (national park)
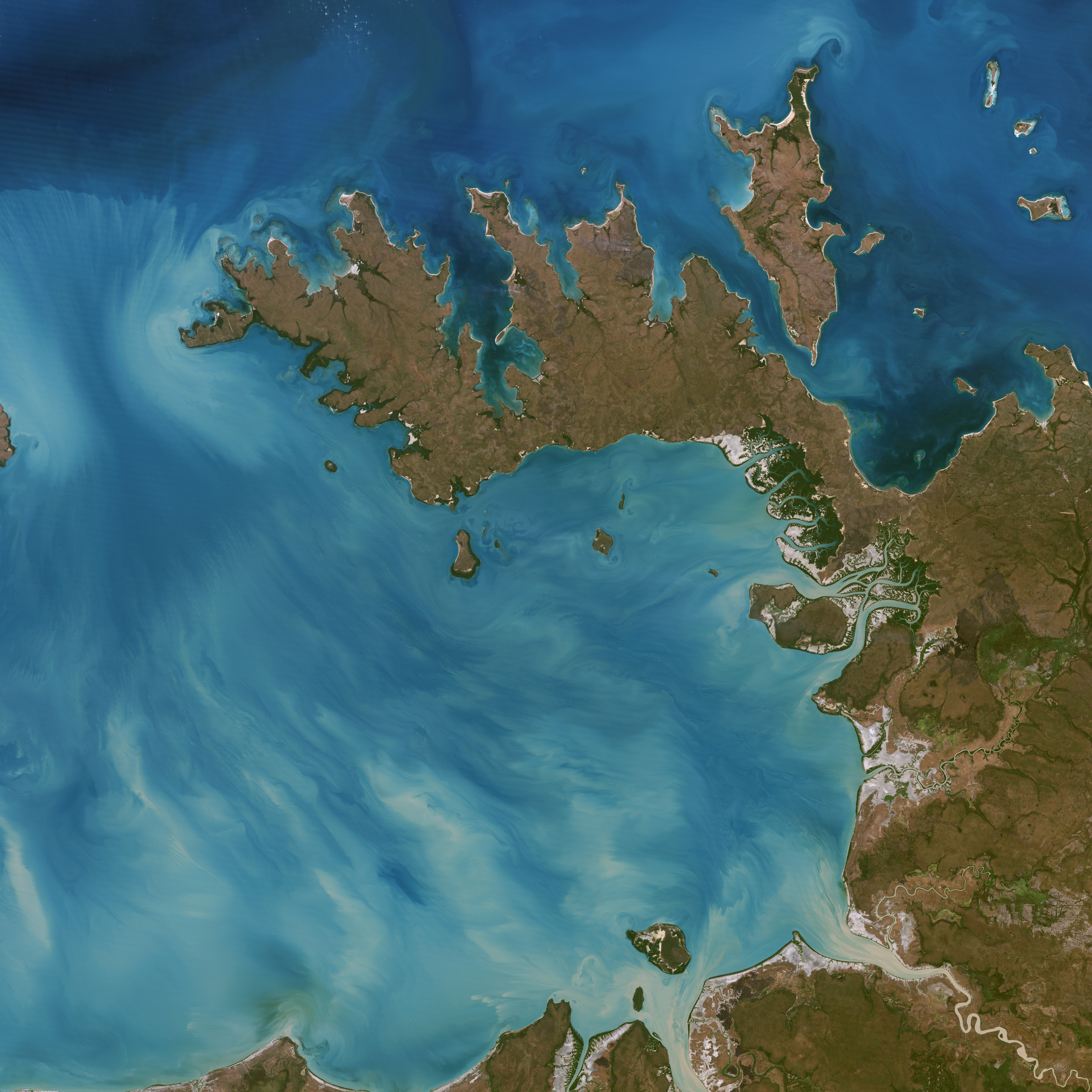
- The Coburg Peninsula from above

- Location within Northern Territory
- Location: Northern Territory
- Nearest city: Jabiru
- Coordinates: 11°19′16″S 132°10′42″E
- Area: 2,260.06 km^{2} (872.61 sq mi)
- Established: 2000
- Governing body: Parks and Wildlife Commission of the Northern Territory; Aboriginal traditional land owners (the Iwaidja people)
- Website: https://nt.gov.au/parks/find-a-park/garig-gunak-barlu-national-park

Ramsar Wetland
- Official name: Cobourg Peninsula
- Designated: 8 May 1974
- Reference no.: 1

Garig Gunak Barlu is a national park in the Northern Territory of Australia on the Cobourg Peninsula and some adjoining waters about 216 kilometres (134 mi) north-east of the territory capital of Darwin.

It was established by joining the former Gurig National Park and the Cobourg Marine Park. Its name derives from the local Garig language, and the words gunak 'land' and barlu 'deep water'.

The national park consists of all land of the Cobourg Peninsula, of Burford Island, the Sir George Hope Islands (from west to east Greenhill, Wangoindjung, Warldagawaji, Morse, Wunmiyi), Mogogout Island and Endyalgout Island (117.4 km^{2}) to the south of the peninsula, and of adjacent waters. Croker Island, although close east of the peninsula, is not part of the park.

It is categorized as an IUCN Category II protected area.

All six species of Australian marine turtle live in the area of ocean which is included in the park—green sea turtles, hawksbill sea turtles, flatback sea turtles, leatherback sea turtles, and olive ridley sea turtles. The surrounding ocean is also inhabited by sharks and cetaceans, and saltwater crocodiles live near the coast. On land, over 200 species of bird are found in the park, as are several species of mammal.

== See also ==
- Protected areas of the Northern Territory
