= Raffles Bay =

Coordinates: 11°16′S 132°23′E

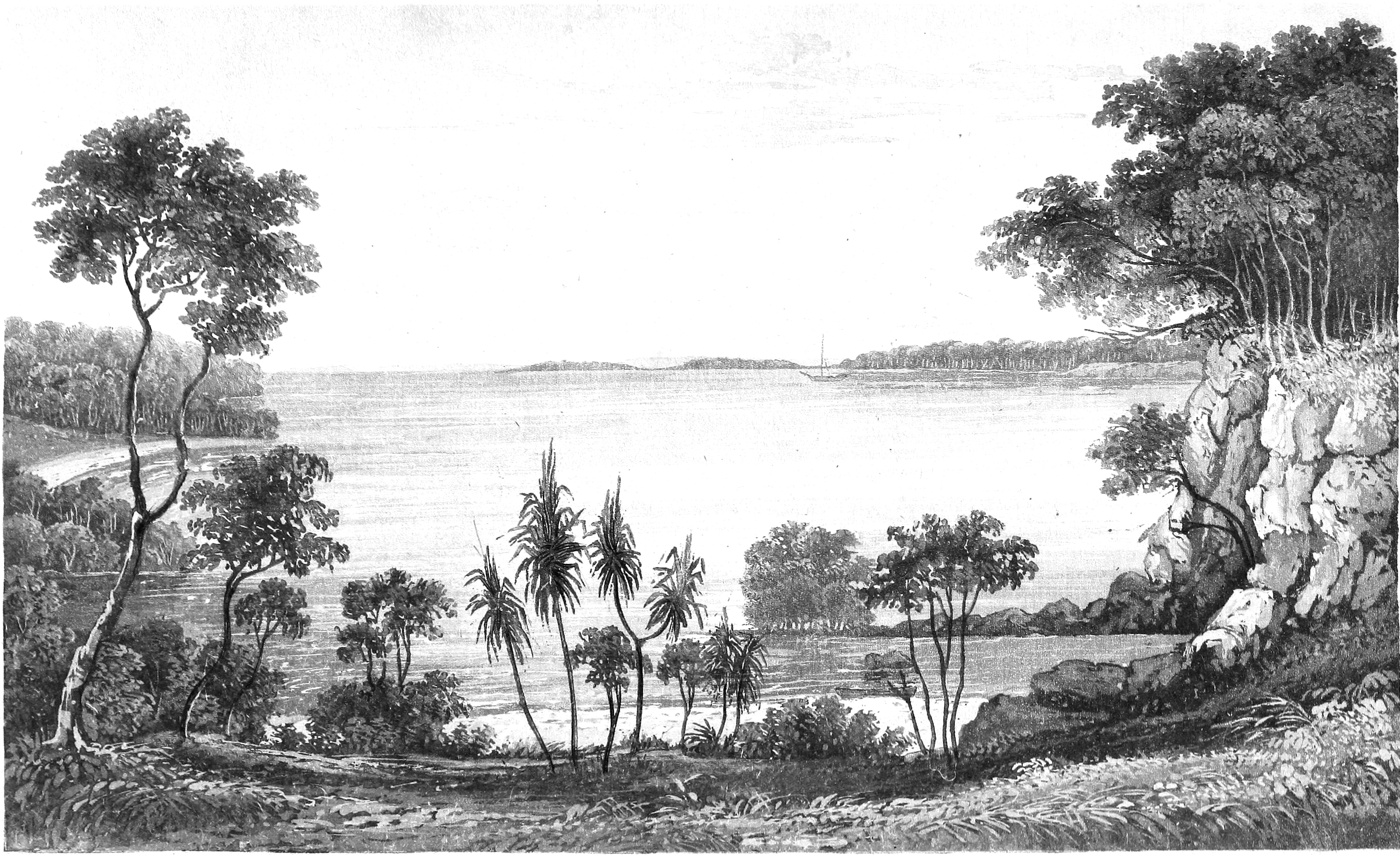
Frontispiece from Vol.1 of Phillip Parker King's 1827 Narrative of a survey of the intertropical and western coasts of Australia of a view of Raffles Bay, with Croker Island in the distance

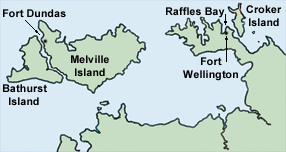
Location of Raffles Bay and Fort Wellington

Raffles Bay is a bay on the northern coast of the Cobourg Peninsula of the Top End of the Northern Territory of Australia. It is on the lands of the Iwaidja people.

It was named in 1818 by explorer Phillip Parker King after Sir Thomas Stamford Raffles, the founder of Singapore. It is about 10 km long north to south, 5 km wide at its mouth and 3 km wide at its inland end. It lies about 210 km north-east of Darwin and opens on to the northern end of Bowen Strait, between the Cobourg Peninsula and Croker Island, and the Arafura Sea. It was the site of an abortive attempt to establish the British military outpost and settlement of Fort Wellington, which lasted only two years, from 1827 to August 1829.

It is the site of the Fort Wellington, Raffles Bay Massacre which killed at least 30 Iwaidja people. This massacre took place on 30 July 1827 under the command of Captain Henry Smyth. The massacre was ordered following the wounding of a soldier, James Taylor, and the Iwaidja encampment was attacked with an 18 pound cannon.

Following this massacre Captain Smyth was replaced by Captain Collet Barker in September 1828. Barker was able to develop a better relationship with the Iwaidja people. Barker left Raffles Bay in August 1829 when given an order to close it.

The surrounds of the bay are largely uninhabited; it now lies within the Garig Gunak Barlu National Park.

== Resources ==
The following resources are available through Library & Archives NT

- Library & Archives NT. (1971). Fort Wellington Raffles Bay. E-Publications Collection. https://hdl.handle.net/10070/424191.
- Library & Archives NT. (1993). The search for Collet Barker of Raffles Bay. Northern Territory Library Occasional Papers Collection. https://hdl.handle.net/10070/718158.
