= Cobourg Peninsula =

Peninsula in Northern Territory, Australia

Coordinates: 11°22′S 132°18′E

Designations

Ramsar Wetland
- Official name: Cobourg Peninsula
- Designated: 8 May 1974
- Reference no.: 1

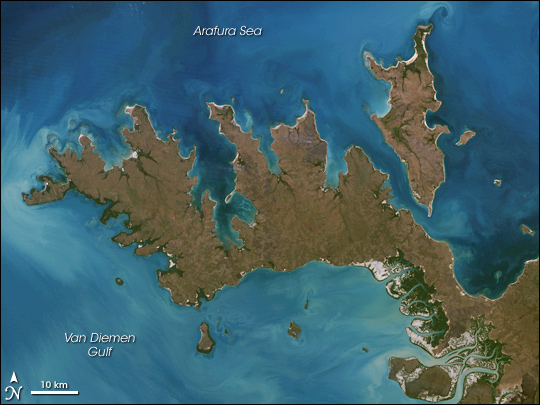
Image of Cobourg Peninsula with Croker Island top right

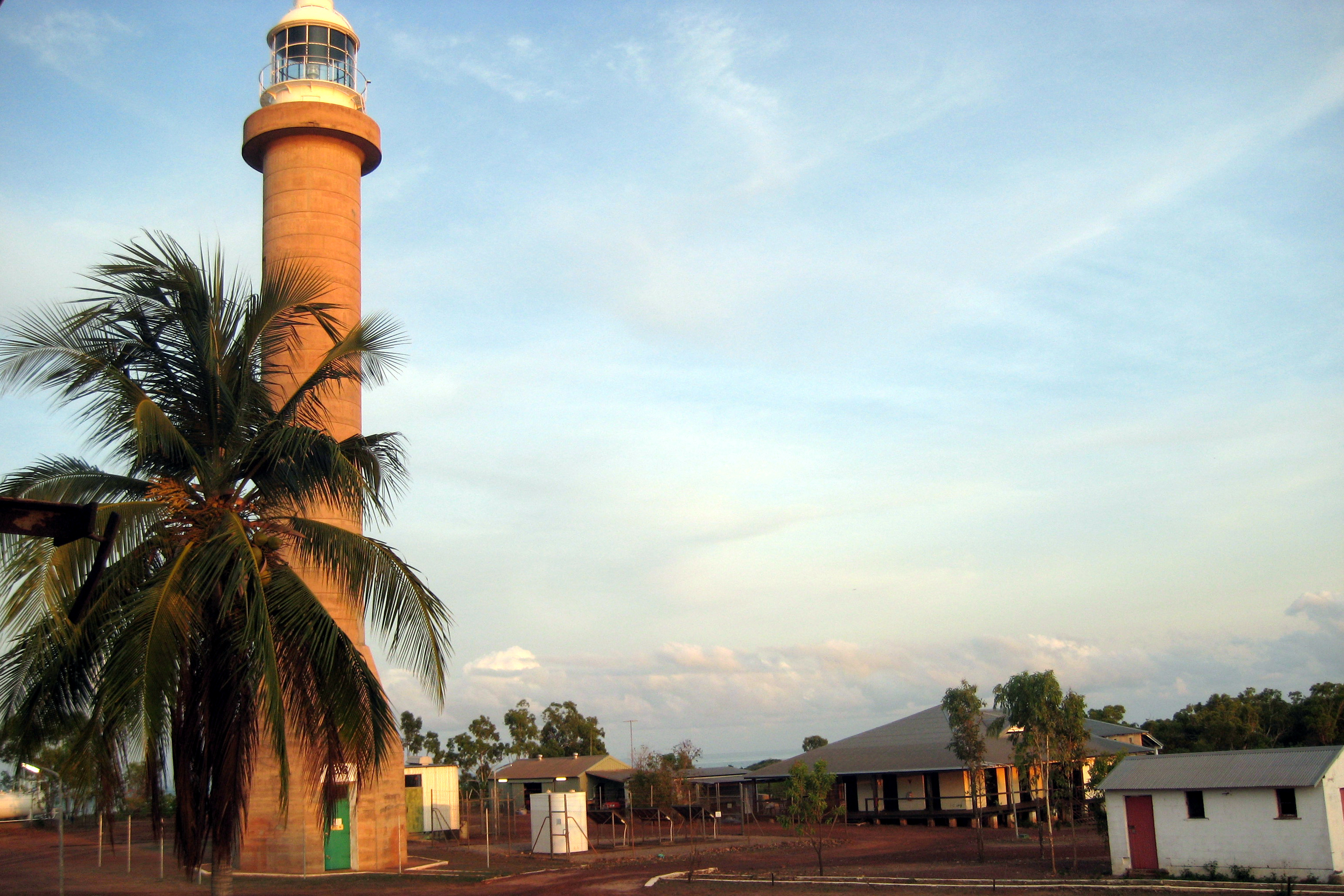
Cape Don Light at the western end of Cobourg Peninsula

The Cobourg Peninsula is a peninsula located 350 kilometres (217 mi) east of Darwin in the Northern Territory, Australia.

== Geography ==
The peninsula is deeply indented with coves and bays, covers a land area of about 2,100 square kilometres (811 sq mi), and is virtually uninhabited with a population ranging from about 20 to 30 in five family outstations, but without any notable settlement or village.

It is separated from Croker Island in the east by Bowen Strait, which is 2.5 kilometres (1.3 nmi; 1.6 mi) wide in the south and up to 7 kilometres (3.8 nmi; 4.3 mi) in the north, and 8.5 kilometres (4.6 nmi; 5.3 mi) long. In the west, it is separated from Melville Island by Dundas Strait. From Cape Don, the western point of the peninsula, to Soldier Point in the east of Melville Island, the distance is 28 kilometres (17 mi). In the north is the Arafura Sea, and in the south the Van Diemen Gulf. The highest elevation is Mount Roe in the south with an altitude of 160 metres (525 ft).

== Name ==
The peninsula was named after Prince Leopold of Saxe-Coburg, later known as Leopold I of Belgium, by Phillip Parker King. The French spelling of the name has been retained over the years.

== History ==
=== Indigenous people ===
The Cobourg Peninsula has been the country of the Iwaidja and the associated Marrgu, Garig and Wurrugu Indigenous Australian people for at least 40,000 years.

=== Foreign exploration ===
European interest in the region began in the 1636 when the Dutch explorer Pieter Pieterszoon sailed along the peninsula's coastline, while Abel Tasman also surveyed the area in 1644. Dutch interest lapsed until 1705 when the Dutch East India Company ordered Captain Maarten van Delft to prepare a fleet of three vessels to make a closer inspection of the region. He remained for three months at the Tiwi Islands before surveying part of the peninsula. He named Maarten Van Delft Bay after himself, which is now known as Port Essington.

For the remainder of the 1700s, foreign interest in the region came from the Makassans, who visited the bay annually from Sulawesi to harvest trepang, shark fin, wax and turtle shell. There was hostility between the Indigenous people and the Makassans with some being made to work on their boats and a number being taken to Makassar. The Indigenous people, however, acquired new technologies from the Macassans such as iron tools.

In 1818, Captain Phillip Parker King in HMS Mermaid began a circumnavigation of Australia and made a detailed survey of the region. He named the Cobourg Peninsula and many of its geographic features such as Port Essington, Raffles Bay, Croker Island and Cape Don. He had a small skirmish with some Indigenous men after he appropriated a human skeleton from a burial site.

=== British military outposts ===
In the 1820s, the British Colonial Office became interested in establishing a settlement on Australia's northern coastline in the hope of both facilitating trade with Asia and discouraging the colonial aspirations of the French and the Dutch in the region.

Melville Island was initially chosen as the site in 1824 and the short-lived military colony of Fort Dundas was founded there. This was subsequently abandoned in 1828 in favour of Fort Wellington at Raffles Bay on the Cobourg Peninsula. However, this too was abandoned in 1829.

Despite these failures, the British persisted with their policy of establishing a colonial outpost in the region and in 1838 Port Essington was chosen as a site to create a settlement, and an outpost, officially named Victoria Settlement was established. This settlement consisting mostly of soldiers and their families continued for 11 years until it too was abandoned in 1849.

=== Cobourg Cattle Company ===
Macassan trepangers continued to visit the region but a more permanent form of British colonisation did not occur again until 1874 when South Australian landholder, John Lewis, arrived to take up a grazing lease on the peninsula. With financial backing from Philip Levi, Lewis formed the Cobourg Cattle Company.

He found the resident Garig-Iwaidja people not only hospitable to their arrival but also possessing an excellent knowledge of English that they had learnt thirty years ago from the soldiers stationed there. Lewis also found large numbers of feral water buffalo which were descendant from those introduced into the area from Timor by the British military. He established a buffalo shooting station and the hides and meat were the main source of income for his Cobourg Cattle Company. Lewis used the bricks from the ruins of the Victoria Settlement for his establishment and employed the Garig-Iwaidja people as labourers whom he paid in rations and tobacco.

In 1878, Edward Oswin Robinson founded a trepanging station on Croker Island and in 1879 he became the manager of the Cobourg Cattle Company. The Company also appointed the local head of police, Inspector Paul Foelsche, as its agent in Palmerston. The company folded in 1885, and Robinson established his own buffalo shooting enterprise on the eastern side of the peninsula.

=== Buffalo shooters ===
Robinson employed Joe Cooper as his main buffalo shooter. Cooper was a tough frontiersman, and together with Robinson and other shooters such as Rodney Spencer, they enforced a brutal reign over the local Indigenous population. In 1905, Robinson and Cooper invaded the Tiwi Islands with a force of twenty Garig-Iwaidja men to expand the range of their buffalo shooting business. They were called the "Rajahs of Melville" and maintained a cruel control over the Tiwi people until the government forced them to leave in 1916.

Cooper returned to the Cobourg Peninsula where he ran a trepanging business until the 1920s. He married an Iwaidja woman named "Alice" and together they had a son named Reuben who, after receiving an education in Adelaide, maintained a timber milling business at Mountnorris Bay on the eastern side of the peninsula. Reuben employed only Aboriginal people at this mill until his death enforced its closure in 1942. Reuben was also employed by L.A. Buckingham as a manager for his peanut farm on Croker Island during the 1930s where around seventy Aboriginal people were labourers.

=== Wildlife and Aboriginal reserves ===
Apart from the small area around the Cape Don Lighthouse (which was constructed in 1915), much of the Cobourg Peninsula was declared a wildlife reserve by the Australian government in 1924. In 1940 some of the eastern part of the peninsula was declared a reserve for Aboriginal people. A Methodist Aboriginal mission was established at Croker Island in 1940. So called "half-caste" children from the Darwin region were sent there as part of the stolen generations policy until it closed in 1968.

In 1974, the Cobourg Peninsula was declared the first wetland of international significance by the Ramsar Convention, and in 2000 the region became a protected area known as the Garig Gunak Barlu National Park, which also encompasses a few nearshore islands. Mostly a tourist attraction, it is known for its pristine wilderness. It is home to a large variety of sea life and the world's largest herd of pure-strain banteng (wild cattle). It is also renowned for its Aboriginal culture. The ruins of the Victoria Settlement at Port Essington are still accessible today.

== Localities ==
There are no notable settlements or villages on Cobourg Peninsula, just a few national park ranger stations and Aboriginal family outstations, as well as other establishments along or close to the north coast, from west to east:

- Cape Don Light (lighthouse)
- Cape Don Airport (ICAO Code YCPD) (grass airfield 1800 m, opened 8 Nov 1989)
- Araru Point (Araru) (family outstation)
- Ardbinae (Adbanae, Trepang Bay) (family outstation)
- Port Essington (Victoria Settlement) (former European settlement)
- Gumuragi (Gumeragi, Reef Point) (family outstation)
- Algarlalgari (Black Point) (ranger station)
- Ngardimardi (Smith Point) (camping area)
- Gul Gul (Danger Point) (abandoned family outstation, ruins)
- Meriah (Mariah, Raffles Bay) (family outstation)
- Irgul (Irgul Point) (family outstation)
- Seven Spirit Bay (high-end wilderness lodge hotel)

The closest village is Minjilang on Croker Island.

== See also ==
- Garig Gunak Barlu National Park
