= Amurdak language =

Endangered Iwaidjan language of Australia's Northern Territory

Amurdag
- Amurdak
- Native to: Australia
- Region: Oenpelli, Goulburn Island, Northern Territory
- Ethnicity: Amurdak
- Native speakers: 1 (2026)
- Language family: Iwaidjan: Amurdag
- Dialects: Urrirk; Gidjurra

Language codes
- ISO 639-3: amg
- Glottolog: amar1271
- AIATSIS: N47
- ELP: Amurdak
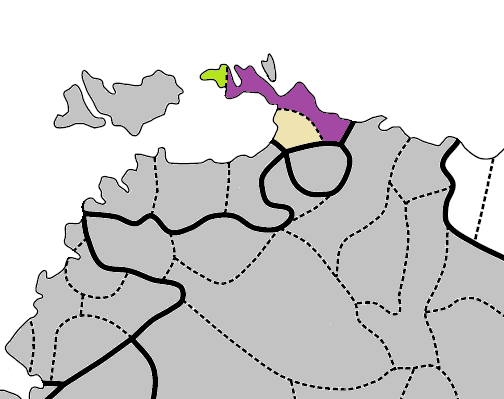
- Amurdak

Amurdak, also rendered Amurdag, Amurdak, Amurag, Amarag and Wureidbug, Aboriginal pronunciation: [amuɽag], is an Aboriginal Australian language historically spoken in an area around the eastern coast of Van Diemen Gulf, in the Northern Territory of Australia. No speakers were recorded in the 2021 census, although the last speaker, Charlie Mungulda, coauthored a paper in 2020 and again in 2026.

== History ==
=== Documentation ===
Arthur Capell was the first to publish data on Amurdak in 1943, classifying it in his classification of Australian languages and the paradigm of free pronouns in it. Unpublished data collected by Mark Harvey was deposited in the Australian Institute of Aboriginal and Torres Strait Islander Studies. Robert Handelsmann wrote his 1991 Master's thesis on Amurdak.

== Dialects ==
Urrirrk (Wurdirrk) was said to be a western dialect of Amurdak. Mungulda could remember only a single phrase in Urrirrk, Yamannganu mirlawurda 'give me fire'.

== Geographical distribution ==
Historically, Amurdak was spoken in the region of Cooper Creek and Awunbarna, located north and northwest of Gunbalanya. Approximately, to the north of Amurdak, Iwaidja and Garig were spoken, Maung was located northeast of it, Gaagudju to its south, and Erre, Mangerr, and Urningangga to the south and southeast.

== Status ==
In 1991, Handelsmann reported that only three people could have spoken Amurdak fluently, and "posssibly two or three others" whom he had not met.

According to a report by the National Geographic Society and the Living Tongues Institute for Endangered Languages, it is an endangered language. The last living speaker, Charlie Mungulda, worked with Australian linguists Nick Evans, Robert Handelsmann and others, over several decades to record his language.

The Amurdak language and Charlie Mungulda were featured in Language Matters with Bob Holman, a 2015 PBS documentary about endangered languages.

The 2016 and 2021 Australian censuses did not report any speakers of Amurdak; however, Mungulda co-authored two papers published in May 2020 and April 2026.

== Phonology ==
=== Consonants ===
		Bilabial	Alveolar	Retroflex	Palatal	Velar
Stop	plain	p	t	ʈ	c	k
Stop	prelateralized		(l͡d)	(ɭ͡ɖ)		
Nasal		m	n	ɳ	ɲ	ŋ
Approximant	median	w		ɻ	j	(ɣ)
Approximant	lateral		l	ɭ	(ʎ)	
Vibrant	median		r	ɽ		
Vibrant	lateral					

Evans (1998) but not Mailhammer (2009) identifies a palatal lateral /ʎ/ in Amurdag. Prelateralized stops /l͡d/ and /ɭ͡ɖ/ are included as phonemic by Handelsmann. /ɣ/ is considered phonemic but is also a free variant of /g/, though the words in which /ɣ/ is phonemic may be from Iwaidja instead.

=== Vowels ===
Amurdak has a three vowel /i, a, u/ system, like other Iwaidjan languages.

	Front	Back
High	i	u
Low	a	
