= Marrgu language =

Extinct language of Australia

Marrgu
- Yaako
- Native to: Australia
- Region: Croker Island, Northern Territory
- Ethnicity: Yaako
- Extinct: September 2003, with the death of Charlie Wardaga
- Language family: Marrku–Wurrugu? Iwaidjan?: Marrgu

Language codes
- ISO 639-3: mhg
- Glottolog: marg1251
- AIATSIS: N45
- ELP: Marrgu
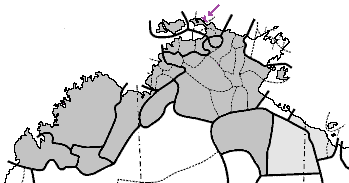
- Marrgu language (purple arrow), among other non-Pama–Nyungan languages (grey)

- Closeup

Marrgu (Marrku) is an extinct Aboriginal language of northern Australia. The last speaker of it died in 2003. Historically, it was considered to be an Iwaidjan language, but this classification is now in doubt, and it is proposed instead to be related to the poorly known Wurrugu language. Additional names include Ajokoot, Croker Island, Raffles Bay, Terrutong (Terutong), and Yaako (Jaako, Yako).

== History ==
In the 1960s, around six speakers of Marrgu remained. The last speaker of Marrgu was Charlie Wardaga, who died in September 2003, though he was not fluent in the language. As of 2015, only a single "hearer" remained, Khaki Marrala. Other such "hearers" included the now-deceased Joy Williams Malwagag, whose mother spoke Marrgu.

=== Language contact ===
Nicholas Evans proposes that Marrgu borrrowed verbal paradigms from the Iwaidjan languages, including Iwaidja and Mawng.

=== Documentaton ===
In the 20th century, less than 50 hours of "partially transcribed textual and elicitation materials" were recorded for Marrgu. A draft sketch grammar and draft dictionary have been prepared.

== Classification ==
Marrgu has historically been assumed to be an Iwaidjan language like its neighbours, along with the extinct and poorly attested Wurrugu language of Popham Bay. Marrgu shares around 20% of its vocabulary with Iwaidja, though it is uncertain how many are loanwords, and less than 5% of verbs are shared. Robert M. W. Dixon had previously expressed doubt about the inclusion of Marrgu and Amurdak within Iwaidjan, and that "a close genetic link here is speculative", and considered Wurrugu to be unclassifiable due to its very poor documentation. Evans (2006) has produced evidence that it was a language isolate, with a possible connection to Wurrugu.

== Phonology ==
=== Consonants ===
Marrgu consonants
| | | Bilabial | Dental | Alveolar | Retroflex | Palatal | Velar |
|---|---|---|---|---|---|---|---|
| Occlusive | oral | b | d̪ | d | ɖ | c | g |
| Occlusive | nasal | m | n̪ | n | ɳ | ɲ | ŋ |
| Approximant | median | w | | | ɻ | j | ɣ |
| Approximant | lateral | | | l | ɭ | (ʎ) | |
| Vibrant | median | | | r | ɽ | | |
| Vibrant | lateral | | | ɺ ⟨ld⟩ | 𝼈 ⟨rld⟩ | (ʎ̮) | |

It is uncertain if the palatal lateral consonants are phonemic.

=== Vowels ===
Marrgu has the three-vowel (/a/, /i/, /u/) system typical of Iwaidjan languages.

| | Front | Back |
|---|---|---|
| High | i | u |
| Low | a | |
