= Manangkardi language =

Extinct Iwaidjan language of Australia

Manangkardi
- Manangkari
- Native to: Australia
- Region: Cobourg Peninsula, Arnhem Land
- Extinct: September 2003, with the death of Charlie Wardaga
- Language family: Iwaidjan: Iwaidjic; Maung; Manangkardi

Language codes
- ISO 639-3: znk
- Glottolog: mana1248
- AIATSIS: N183

Manangkardi (Manangkari), also known as Naragani, is an extinct Australian Aboriginal language once spoken in the Cobourg Peninsula, Northern Territory. Manangkari belongs to the Iwaidjan family of languages, and may be a dialect of Maung or a distinct language.

== Geographical distribution ==
Different locations are given for the placement of traditionally Manangkardi-speaking territory. According to Australian Aboriginal elders at Warruwi (South Goulburn Island), Manangkardi was said to be the original language of both Warruwi, as well as Weyirra (North Goulburn Island). However, those who had worked with Nicholas Evans at Minjilang (Croker Island) associated Mamangkardi with Weyirra and a portion of the mainland coast to the west of the island.

== Classification ==
Manangkardi is referred to either as "a kind of Mawng" or a distinct language from it. It is uncertain whether or not the two were mutually intelligible. The name "Manangkardi" is never used to modify "Mawng".

== History ==
The last speaker of Manangkardi was Charlie Wardaga, who died in September 2003.

=== Documentation ===
Evans was unable to record data from Manangkardi from Wardaga, although he was able to for Garig-Ilgar and Marrgu, and other sources claim he recorded "a small amount of data". Mirrijpu 'seagull' songs have been recorded in Manangkardi from songman Solomon Nangamu.

== Phonology ==
=== Consonants ===
	Peripheral		Laminal	Apical	
	Bilabial	Velar	Palatal	Alveolar	Retroflex
Plosive	p	k	c	t	ʈ
Nasal	m	ŋ	ɲ	n	ɳ
Approximant	w	ɣ	j		ɻ
Trill				r	
Flap					ɽ
Lateral			(ʎ)	l	ɭ
Lateral flap				ɺ ⟨ld⟩	𝼈 ⟨rld⟩

Like most Iwaidjan languages, but unlike Marrgu, Manangkardi does not have a laminal dental series.

=== Vowels ===
Evans (1998) briefly discusses vowels in his paper, noting that Iwaidjan languages, including Manangkardi, have a three vowel (/a/, /i/, /u/) system typical of most Australian languages.

	Front	Back
High	i	u
Low	a	
