= Gaari people =

Protected area in the Northern Territory, Australia

The Gaari were an indigenous Australian people of the Northern Territory, who lived on a small island in the Arafura Sea.

== Language ==
The Gaari language is believed to have differed only slightly from Mawng.

== Country ==
The Gaari's traditional land, including reefs offshore, comprised the 20 sq. miles, predominantly the area of Grant Island close to the nearby Goulburn Islands and 10 miles north of Cape Cockburn. The native name of the island is Wuru:ldja. Tindale elsewhere places them on Howard Island, although this may be an error.

== People ==
The Gaari are registered by Norman Tindale as a separate tribe, but he notes that they may possibly have been a horde of the Mawng.

== Sources ==
- North, West and South Coasts of Australia. National Geospatial-Intelligence Agency. 2004. ISBN 978-1-577-85655-9.
- Tindale, Norman Barnett (1974). "Gaari(NT)". Aboriginal Tribes of Australia: Their Terrain, Environmental Controls, Distribution, Limits, and Proper Names. Australian National University. ISBN 978-0-708-10741-6. Archived from the original on 20 March 2020.
