= Mondalmi =

Aboriginal activist and cultural informant

- Died: 23 October 1969
- Resting place: Goulburn Island
- Monuments: Mondalmi Place, Bonner, ACT
- Other names: Mondalmi Milimili; Ngalwububul; Bubu

Mondalmi (born c. 1910; died 23 October 1969) was an Aboriginal activist and cultural informant from Australia.

== Biography ==
Mondalmi was born around 1910 in Wighu, South Goulburn Island, Western Arnhem Land (although her brother, in his autobiography, states she was born in 1906). Her people were the Maung. Mondalmi's dreaming was an ubaidj (njindjarigarngulg). Her father worked at some points in his life for Macassan traders from Sulawesi, who paid him to collect trepang. Her mother, Ngalmiyjalwarn, was from the Junction Bay area. Her brother was Pastor Lazarus Lamilami, who like Mondalmi, became an important guardian of cultural heritage.

In 1916 she was taken to the Methodist Mission on South Goulburn Island, where she learnt to read and write English, as well as learning how to sew and basketry. She later continued to work there as a domestic servant. She married Gadawar, also known as Ganaraidj, on 27 June 1927. He also used the name John and was a lay preacher at the mission. They had seven sons and two daughters, who were born between 1928 and 1953. They brought their children up speaking Maung and ensuring they were taught traditional ways, despite being brought up on, and going to school at, the Methodist Mission.

She died of cancer on 23 October 1969 at Goulburn Island.

== Legacy ==
Mondalmi's oral histories and testimony make her a key source for our understanding of Aboriginal life in Western Arnhem Land. Much of her testimony was recorded by anthropologist Catherine Berndt from 1947 onwards in a collaboration between the two. Mondalmi discussed with Berndt that some children, who have a white father and a black mother, reject their mothers. She also discussed sexual relations within their community with Bernt, including how polygamous marriages were banned from the mission. Mondalmi also discussed practices of gathering food with the seasons. She also helped others learn the Maung language, like nurse Heather Hewett. She tried to transfer much of her knowledge of plants, children's songs, sign language, kinship, bush medicine and many more topics to Berndt, to enable others to understand her culture more deeply, with a particular focus on her lived experiences as a woman.

Mondalmi herself recognised the importance of creating a record of her life and culture. When talking about her culture, she had "a real storyteller's sense of balance and detail". She was proud of her heritage and proud of the distinction in being a "saltwater person", "from the beach" rather than the bush. She spoke many languages in addition to Maung, including Yiwadja, Gunbalang and English, and she understood Kunwinjku.

== Remembrance ==
Mondalmi, her brother Lamilami and the anthropologist Berndt all have streets named after them in Bonner, a suburb of Canberra.
