= Lazarus Lamilami =

Aboriginal Australian preacher (c. 1908–1977)

Lazarus Lamilami or Merwulidji (c. 1908 to 1913 – 20 September 1977) was a Maung man and Methodist preacher who was born around 1908 to 1913 at Brogden Beach in Warruwi in western Arnhem Land in the Northern Territory of Australia.

== Life ==
Lamilami was the so of Nangurulur and his wife Ngalmajulwun who were a part of the Maung language group whose territory included the Goulburn Islands. He spent much of his early childhood travelling with his family between the mainland and the Goulburn Islands and were mostly semi-nomadic. The family moved permanently to the Goulburn Island Mission when it was established by the Methodist Missionary Society of Australasia in 1916. At the mission he attended the school established there but was also initiated as a Maung man.

As a young man Lamilami trained as a carpenter and began working on the missions lugger which travelled between Darwin and the various missions established along the coastline. In 1930 Lamilami married Magumiri in the church and this wedding had been arranged by Maung elders, the marriage ended within five years. He also sailed on naval patrol vessels monitoring Japanese pearlers in the lead up to war.

During World War II Lamilami lived on Croker Island where he built houses for the Croker Island Mission, this is where many First Nations children were sent during this period; they were later evacuated as a part of the 'Croker Island Exodus'.

In 1947 Lamilami married Ilidjili and this marriage did not take place in the church but in accordance with Maung customs; they had three children together Ruby (Nangurinyara), Ronald (Ilugilug) and Lloyd (Dabidjara). That same year Lamilami began working as a carpenter at the Golbourn Island Mission and was involved with missionary activities and, as a part of this, he went on a number of tours with the other missionaries based there and delivered talks about his people and his life at churches around Australia. These talks were well received and, on his return home, he became a visiting evangelist.

In 1964 the Methodist Missionary Society of Australasia transferred him to Croker Island where he fulfilled the dual roles or carpenter and preacher. The following year he was accepted as a candidate for ministry and was sent to study in Adelaide; he was ordained on 5 November 1966 and, in doing so, was the first ordained Minister; he then returned to Croker Island. In 1968 he was given an Member of the Order of the British Empire (MBE) for his services to the community.

In January 1977 Lamilami began working for Nungalinya College as a lecturer in Aboriginal studies and was on the council of the Institute of Aboriginal Studies.

He died on 21 September 1977 of septicaemia.
