= Lateral flap =

Family of consonant sounds

A lateral flap is a family of consonantal sounds, used in some spoken languages.

There are four attested or claimed lateral flaps in the world's languages:

- The alveolar lateral flap [ɺ] is quite common.
- A retroflex lateral flap [𝼈 ] ([ɭ̆ ]) is found throughout South Asia, from Pashtun to Oriya, in the Iwaidjan languages of Australia, and sporadically elsewhere.
- A palatal lateral flap [ʎ̆] has been described from Iwaidja, but the authors note that it may be a palatalized alveolar flap [ɺʲ].
- A velar lateral flap [ʟ̆] occurs allophonically in Melpa and a few other languages of New Guinea.

== Features ==
Features of lateral flap:

- Its manner of articulation is tap or flap, which means it is produced with a single contraction of the muscles so that one articulator (usually the tongue) is thrown against another.
- It is a lateral consonant, which means it is produced by directing the airstream over the sides of the tongue, rather than down the middle.
