= Amurdak =

Indigenous Australian people

The Amurdak, people, also written Amarak and Ngamarak, are an Indigenous Australian people of the Cobourg Peninsula in the Northern Territory. The Amurdak people traditionally inhabited the coastal regions and hinterlands of the Cobourg Peninsula, including parts of the Garig Gunak Barlu National Park.

== Language ==
The language of the Amarak, Amurdak, is now virtually extinct, the last known speaker being Charlie Mungulda. It was also known as Wardadjbak, and belongs to the Iwaidja language family. It had two dialects, Urrik and Didjurra.

== Country ==
The Amurdak's traditional lands extended over some 900 square miles (2,300 km^{2}) around the eastern coast of Van Diemen Gulf. Their northern extend lay beyond Murgenella Creek and in the vicinity of Cooper Creek, while their southern frontier was close to the East Alligator River.

== Mythology ==
According to the widespread creation story of the Cobourg Peninsula dreamtime, the Amurdak (Umoriu) descended from Imberombera deposited who children at a place near Cooper Creek known as Mamul. One of the children was called Kominuuru, and, on leaving, she told them to speak Amurdak, and an edible bulb called murarowa.

== Alternative names ==
- Amarag, Amuruk, Amurag, Amurrak
- Ngamurak, Ngamurag, Nga:mu:rak
- Umoriu
- Monobar (?)
- A'moordiyu
- Amardak
- Amurdag
- Amurtak
- Amuruk
- Mamurug
- Namurug
- Umoreo
- Umorrdak
- Wardadjbak
- Woraidbug
- Wureidbug

== Sources ==
- Dixon, Robert M. W. (2002). Australian Languages: Their Nature and Development. Vol. 1. Cambridge University Press. ISBN 978-0-521-47378-1.
- Schmid, Randolph E. (18 September 2007). "Researchers Say Many Languages Are Dying". The Washington Post. Associated Press.
- Simons, Gary F.; Fennig, Charles D., eds. (2018). "Amurdak". Ethnologue: Languages of the World (21st ed.). Ethnologue.
- Spencer, Baldwin (1914). Native tribes of the Northern Territory of Australia (PDF). London: Macmillan Publishers.
- Tindale, Norman Barnett (1974). "Amarak (NT)". Aboriginal Tribes of Australia: Their Terrain, Environmental Controls, Distribution, Limits, and Proper Names. Australian National University. ISBN 978-0-708-10741-6. Archived from the original on 20 March 2020.
