= Giimbiyu =

Giimbiyu may refer to:

- Giimbiyu people
- Giimbiyu language
