= Margaret Heffernan (disambiguation) =

Margaret Heffernan (born 1955) is an American entrepreneur, CEO, writer and keynote speaker.

Margaret Heffernan may also refer to:

- Margaret Heffernan (linguist) (born 1943), Australian linguist
- Margaret Heffernan (Irish businesswoman) (born 1942), Irish businesswoman
