= Language Matters with Bob Holman =

- Directed by: David Grubin
- Written by: Bob Holman
- Produced by: David Grubin; Bob Holman
- Starring: Bob Holman; Keapa Maly; W.S. Merwin; Arlene W. Eaton; Keali'I Reichel; Larry Kimura; Nick Evans; Puakea Nogelmeier; Kauanoe Kamana; Gwyneth Lewis; Lolena Nicholas; Kaui Sai-Dudoit; Pete Harmon
- Cinematography: James Callanan; Bob Richman
- Edited by: Deborah Peretz
- Release date: January 2015
- Country: United States
- Languages: English; Welsh; Hawaiian; Amurdag

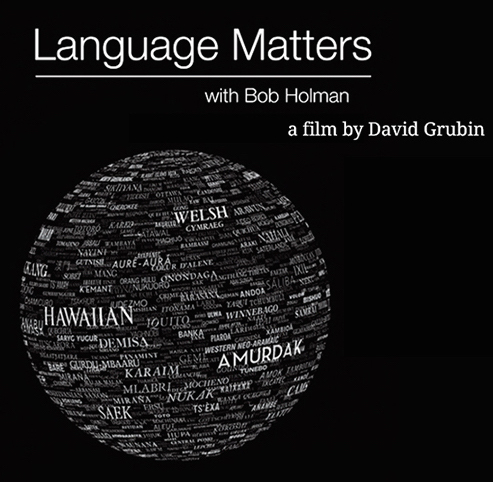

Language Matters with Bob Holman is a 2015 documentary that focuses upon the rapid extinction of many of planet Earth's human languages and the multifarious struggles and efforts to save and preserve them. Holman states that "There are between 6,000 and 7,000 languages spoken in the world today. Languages have always come and gone but what is happening today is "a global crisis of massive proportions "... The feature is directed by David Grubin and narrated and hosted by Holman

The film spans the globe to visit three geographic areas Australia (both out in the Outback of and in the Goulburn Islands off of the Northern Territory), Hawaii and Wales or as the film's own website explains..."Language Matters was filmed around the world: on a remote island off the coast of Australia where 400 Aboriginal people speak 10 different languages, all at risk; in Wales, where Welsh, once in danger, is today making a comeback; and in Hawaii, where Hawaiians are fighting to save their native tongue."

The film was first broadcast on PBS in 2015 on the following dates; in New York City, Pittsburgh, San Francisco and Washington, DC on January 25, 2015 then on January 27 in Columbus, Ohio, on January 29 in Chicago and Los Angeles, on February 5, Boston and finally on February 23, in Syracuse. Meanwhile, the film is being streamed on the Public Broadcasting Service's website www.PBS.ORG.

== Critical reception ==
Levi Asher in writing for the online journal, Literary Kicks says in reviewing the film that... "it is a delightful and captivating two-hour documentary". He later concludes his commentary on the piece by stating, "Language Matters appears to be a television documentary about remote cultures and faraway peoples. It turns out to be a show about us all".

The Best American Poetry in reviewing the program on their blog states ...""Language Matters" is the first nationwide media recognition of the Language Crisis, which is not just about languages, but cultural diversity. It's about global homogenization, the Pringleization of society, about cultures being steamrolled under globalization"...
