= Giimbiyu language =

Extinct Aboriginal Australian language

Giimbiyu
- Mangerr
- Native to: Australia
- Region: Northern Territory
- Extinct: 1980s–1990s
- Language family: Arnhem Land?: Giimbiyu
- Dialects: Mangerr; Erri; Urningangga
- Writing system: Latin (Australian Aboriginal)

Language codes
- ISO 639-3: Variously: zme – Mangerr urc – Urningangg err – Erre
- Glottolog: giim1238
- AIATSIS: N220
- ELP: Urningangga
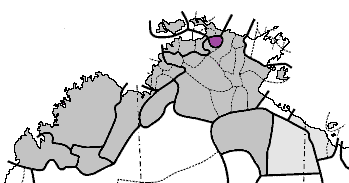
- Giimbiyu (purple), among other non-Pama-Nyungan languages (grey)

Giimbiyu is an extinct Aboriginal Australian language isolate once spoken by the Giimbiyu people of northern Australia.

== Name ==
The name Giimbiyu is a Gaagudju word for 'of the stoney country'. It was introduced in Harvey (1992) as a cover term for the named dialects,

- Mangerr (Mengerrdji)
- Urningangga (Wuningak)
- Erri (Arri)

== Classification ==
In 1997 Nicholas Evans proposed an Arnhem Land family that includes the Giimbiyu languages. However, they are not included in Bowern (2011).

== Phonology ==
=== Consonants ===
	Peripheral		Laminal	Apical		
	Labial	Velar	Palatal	Alveolar	Retroflex	
	Labial	Velar	Palatal	Alveolar	plain	pal.
Plosive	p	k	ɟ	t	ʈ	
Nasal	m	ŋ	ɲ	n	ɳ	
Fricative		ɣ				
Tap				ɾ		
Lateral			ʎ	l	ɭ	ɭʲ
Approximant	w		j		ɻ	

- Coarticulation among consonants is also present.
- Among consonant-coarticulation, /ɣ/ when preceding sounds /l, ɾ/ may result in being heard as a voiceless palatal [ç].

=== Vowels ===
	Front		Back
High	ɪ		u
Mid	ɛ	ø	u
Low	a		

- /u/ may also be heard as [o].
- Coarticulation among a preceding /ɪ/, may result in the vowel sound becoming more central [ɪ̈] or as a diphthong [ɪə].

== Vocabulary ==
Capell (1942) lists the following basic vocabulary items:

gloss	Mangeri	Uningangk
man	wurilg	wurig
woman	ŋeːn	ŋeːn
head	wiliŋerm	ulŋerb
eye	iːm	iːm
nose	jingolm	ingolb
mouth	jagir	indjaːd
tongue	nindjadj	indjaːd
stomach	abeɽweɽe	abeɽwe
bone	ijerm	mulgud
blood	maneŋulm	waija
kangaroo	oidjbaɣar	wurulamb
opossum	muŋaːd	malijarŋ
emu	wiwijüw	iwidjiw
crow	gagud	gagud
fly	muɳimuɳi	maŋanaŋaɳ
sun	muɣaːliŋ	indjuwawi
moon	järagäl	järagäl
fire	wiɽumgarm	widjälim
smoke	wuŋɛŋg	wuŋɛŋg
water	ogog	ogog
