= Maung people =

Aboriginal Australian people of the Northern Territory

The Maung people, or Warruwi, are an Aboriginal Australian people living on the Goulburn Islands, in the Arafura Sea off the coast of the Northern Territory.

== Language ==
Maung is not one of the majority Pama-Nyungan languages, but belongs to the Iwaidjic subgroup of the Iwaidjan languages, spoken, together with Manangkardi, on Goulburn Island. The language was first described in some detail by Arthur Capell and Heather Hinch.

== Country ==
Norman Tindale estimated the extent of Maung territory at 500 square miles (1,300 km^{2}), covering both the Goulburn Islands and the adjacent coastal lands. Their eastern extension was as far as east to King River, Braithwaite Point and Junction Bay. Their western limits were at the Sandy and Angularli creeks.

The seasons were of two basic kinds: the wet season, which lasted until either in May or June, followed by the dry season which concluded in October/ November. The native calendar was fixed by correlating the onset of seasons with minute changes observed in the fauna and flora. The harbinger for the end of the wet season was the peewee, whose arrival signaled that it was time to harvest mawain, a type of water lily root. Brown scum, mangirgirra, on the coastal waters meant it was time to go out and fish for a small variety of shark, which abounded at this time, in August; when the waluru' or stringy bark began to flower, it meant that turtles were mating, and, once the blossoms were due to fall, the hunting period for these turtles began.

Contrary to widespread perceptions concerning Aboriginal people as a purely hunting and gathering nomadic people, evidence that a number of groups understood and engaged in agriculture, by culling roots and replanting them for a seasonal harvest has also been forthcoming in studies of the Maung. Lamilami's grandfather would gather mungubdi lilies and a tapioca like roots called gurabel and take them to other locations such as billabongs where they would be planted. The same was done with the banyan and cabbage trees, in order to provide shade.

== History ==
The Methodist mission established on the island in 1916 regarded the traditional culture as something inimical to the modern Western work ethic they wished to inculcate, and in order to make a breach in the normal patterns of Maung life, with regard to Warruri women, they introduced basketry in 1922. The technique which was introduced however was one derived from observation of the coiling method current among the weavers of the Ngarrindjeri tribe which the Methodist instructor, Gretta Matthews, had learnt of while in Glenelg, South Australia. The mastery of this technique had a major impact as Iwadja relatives on Croker Island, the Kunibidji in the Maningrida area and the Kunwinjku at Gunbalanya (Oenpelli) learnt it, and in turn it was spread throughout Arnhem Land and the Gulf of Carpentaria.

== Notable people ==
- Lazarus Lamilami (1908 /1913 /-1977), was a fully initiated Maung who became the first full-blooded Aboriginal person to be ordained a Methodist minister, in 1965, and wrote an autobiography of his life and times.
- Mondalmi, Lamilami's sister, cultural guardian, linguist and activist who collaborated with anthropologist Catherine Berndt to record the traditional ways of her people.

== Alternative names ==
- Kunmarung (Kunwinjku exonym)
- Manangari
- Mau
- Mauung

== Sources ==
- Capell, Arthur; Hinch, Heather E. (1970). Maung Grammar: Texts and Vocabulary. Mouton.
- Cole, Keith (2000). "Lamilami, Lazarus (1913–1977)". Australian Dictionary of Biography. Vol. 15. Melbourne University Press.
- Evans, Nicholas (2000). "Iwaidja mutation and its origins". In Kreidler, Charles W. (ed.). Phonology: Critical Concepts in Linguistics. Vol. 4. Taylor & Francis. pp. 111–144. ISBN 978-0-415-20348-7.
- Garde, Murray. "kunmarung". Bininj Kunwok online dictionary. Bininj Kunwok Regional Language Centre.
- Lamilami, Lazarus (1974). Lamilami Speaks: The Cry Went Up, a Story of the People of Goulburn Islands, North Australia. Ure Smith. ISBN 978-0-725-40198-6.
- Laudine, Catherine (2016) [First published 2009]. Aboriginal Environmental Knowledge: Rational Reverence. Routledge. ISBN 978-1-317-18609-0.
- Prentis, Malcolm David (2011). Concise Companion to Aboriginal History. Rosenberg. ISBN 978-1-921-71961-5.
- Tindale, Norman Barnett (1974). "Maung (NT)". Aboriginal Tribes of Australia: Their Terrain, Environmental Controls, Distribution, Limits, and Proper Names. Australian National University. ISBN 978-0-708-10741-6. Archived from the original on 20 March 2020.
- West, Margie (2015). "Yuta Djama: Innovation in Australian Indigenous Fibre". In Jefferies, Janis; Conroy, Diana Wood; Clark, Hazel (eds.). The Handbook of Textile Culture. Bloomsbury Publishing. pp. 293–308. ISBN 978-1-474-27579-8.
