= Watta people =

Indigenous Australian people

The Watta were an indigenous Australian people of the Northern Territory.

== Country ==
In Norman Tindale 's estimation the Watta held about 3,500 square miles (9,100 km^{2}) of territory, inland around the eastern bank of the South Alligator River, as far east to the headwaters of the East Alligator River.

== Social organization and practices ==
The Watta are notable for the fact that they constitute the most southeastern tribe which refrained from the rites of circumcision in the Northern territory.

== Alternative names ==
- Wada
- Wad:a
- Wadjigim (?)
- Marigianbirik (Note: "These are all comparatively large communities, but the mountain range beyond is in possession of a people which appears to be more numerous than all the others put together, and which goes by the general name of 'Marigianbirik,' or people of the mountains. This tribe occupies a great extent of the uplands.")

== Sources ==
- Earl, G. Windsor (1846). "On the Aboriginal Tribes of the Northern Coast of Australia". The Journal of the Royal Geographical Society of London. 16: 239–251. doi:10.2307/1798232. JSTOR 1798232.
- Elkin, A. P.; Berndt, R. M.; Berndt, C. H. (June 1951). "Social Organization of Arnhem Land". Oceania. 21 (4). Sydney: 253–301. doi:10.1002/j.1834-4461.1951.tb00176.x. JSTOR 40328302.
- Spencer, Baldwin (1914). Native tribes of the Northern Territory of Australia (PDF). London: Macmillan Publishers.
- Tindale, Norman Barnett (1974). "Watta (NT)". Aboriginal Tribes of Australia: Their Terrain, Environmental Controls, Distribution, Limits, and Proper Names. Australian National University. ISBN 978-0-708-10741-6.
