= Iwaidjan languages =

Aboriginal language family of Australia

Iwaidjan
- Geographic distribution: Cobourg Peninsula region, Northern Territory
- Linguistic classification: Arnhem Land?: Iwaidjan
- Subdivisions: Iwaidjic; Amurdag; ?Marrgu–Wurrugu †

Language codes
- Glottolog: iwai1246
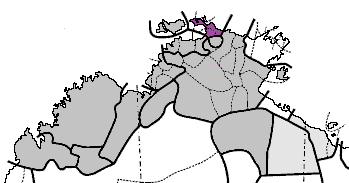
- Iwaidjan languages (purple), among other non-Pama-Nyungan languages (grey)

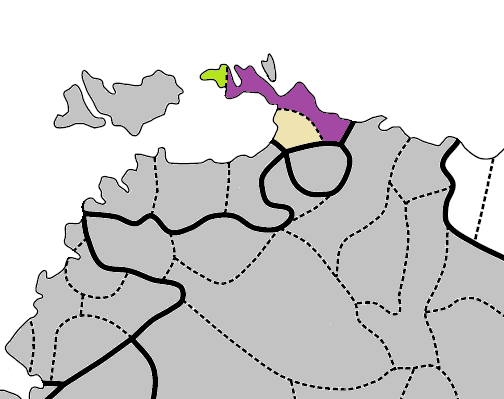
- Closeup. Amurdag is the southern section (tan), Wurrugu the tip of the peninsula (green), the rest Iwaidjic (purple). On the grey island just offshore is Marrgu, once thought to be Iwaidjan.

The Iwaidjan or Yiwaidjan languages are a small family of non-Pama–Nyungan Australian Aboriginal languages spoken in the Cobourg Peninsula region of Western Arnhem Land.

In 1997 Nicholas Evans proposed an Arnhem Land family that includes the Iwaidjan languages, though their inclusion is not accepted in Bowern (2011).

== The Iwaidjan languages ==
- Iwaidjan
  - - Iwaidjic
      - - Warrkbi
          - Iwaidja
          - - Garig †
            - Ilgar †
      - - Manangkardi †
        - Maung
  - Amurdag

Garig and Ilgar are two almost identical dialects. Manangkari may be a dialect of Maung.

Dixon (2002) considers Warrkbi demonstrated, but Iwaidjic (Warrkbi-Maung) and Iwaidjan to be speculative. He predicts that working out the histories of the languages will be a "profound challenge", regardless of whether they are a genealogical family or a language area.

Marrgu and Wurrugu, previously lumped in with Iwaidjan, have little in common with it and may turn out to be a separate family.

== Status ==
As of 1998, Iwaidja was spoken by about 150 people in the community of Minjilang on Croker Island, alongside English, Kunwinjku and Maung. Maung is primarily spoken in the community of Warruwi on Goulburn Island, and it too has about 150 speakers. Both languages are still being learned by children. More recent assessments of the status of Iwaidja and Maung are that both have around 200 speakers and are spoken daily by a full age range of people.

All the other Iwaidjan languages are close to extinction. In 1998, Amurdak had three remaining speakers and Garig and Ilgar three speakers between them. However, some of these languages have younger people who, while not fluent, can aid in translating old recordings in an attempt to archive or revive the language.

== Phonology ==
The Iwaidjan languages have similar phoneme inventories. Exceptions are noted below the tables.

=== Vowels ===
	Front	Back
High	i	u
Low	a	

In addition to these, Maung also has /e/ and /o/, mostly in loanwords from Kunwinjku and Kunbarlang.

=== Consonants ===
	Peripheral		Laminal	Apical	
	Bilabial	Velar	Palatal	Alveolar	Retroflex
Plosive	p	k	c	t	ʈ
Nasal	m	ŋ	ɲ	n	ɳ
Approximant	w	ɰ	j		ɻ
Trill				r	
Tap					ɽ
Lateral approximant			ʎ	l	ɭ
Lateral flap				ɺ	𝼈

Maung lacks the two flapped laterals, which are quite unusual among Australian languages. Also unusual is the velar approximant /ɰ/, which is an areal feature shared with Tiwi and Kunbarlang.

== Relationships with other languages ==
The vocabularies of all the Iwaidjan languages contain loanwords from Macassarese and Malay, both Malayo-Polynesian languages from Indonesia. Iwaidja and Maung have also borrowed heavily from Kunwijku, another Australian language of the Gunwingguan family.

While the Iwaidjan languages share a number of features with other non-Pama–Nyungan language families, it is uncertain which they are closest related to. Ross has proposed that they form part of an Arnhem Land family.

== Vocabulary ==
Capell (1940) lists the following basic vocabulary items (with Amarag words from Capell 1942)

The following basic vocabulary terms are collated from Capell (1940), Capell (1942), and Evans (2000):

gloss	Maung	Iwaidja	Amarag
man	arargbi	waːrgbi	awuɭaɭu
woman	waramuŋbig	woraidjba	wuraidbaru
head	wandji	bagal	iwulja
eye	won	jaɽ	waliwu
nose	mulu	mul	wiːl
mouth	ilagbiridj	ɽagbiridj	wiiŋara
tongue	ŋaɽalg	garalg	wiŋaril
stomach	gɔːrag	galal	aɖigu
bone	ijaɣig	gilir	igada
blood	maniŋog	maniŋul	maniŋul
kangaroo	aijaŋ	jilbuwi	malaijuwar
opossum	wundäru	muŋarg	waŋguwu
emu	waramundubu		ganguɽg
crow	gɔragag	gumbulag	gubula
fly	molg	moɭg	mulgulg
sun	mowan	muwar	mänjidj
moon	gorana	guɽana	gurana
fire	juŋgu	gudjäli	gudjäli
smoke	wuŋain	guŋain	guŋaṉ
water	wobaidj	wobaidj	aɖawud

== Notes ==
=== See also ===
*Blake, Nelson Muluriny; Wightman, Glenn Mitchell; Lorraine Lesley Victoria Williams (1997), Iwaidja ethnobotany: Aboriginal plant knowledge from Gurig National Park, northern Australia, Parks and Wildlife Commission of the Northern Territory, Wikidata Q109466416
