= Garig–Ilgar language =

Extinct Iwaidjan language of Australia

Garig–Ilgar
- Native to: Australia
- Region: Cobourg Peninsula, Northern Territory
- Ethnicity: Ilgar, Gaari
- Extinct: September 2003, with the death of Charlie Wardaga
- Language family: Iwaidjan: Iwaidjic; Warrkbi; Garig–Ilgar
- Dialects: Ilgar; Garig

Language codes
- ISO 639-3: ilg
- Glottolog: gari1253
- AIATSIS: N184 Ilgar, N188 Garig
- ELP: Ilgar

Garig–Ilgar, after its two dialects, is an extinct Iwaidjan language spoken in the mainland of Cobourg Peninsula, around Port Essington, Northern Territory.

== Dialects ==
Garig and Ilgar are, according to Nicholas Evans, "nearly identical" dialects of a single language.

== Classification ==
Evans' provisional classification of Iwaidjan and that of Robert Mailhammer groups Garig and Ilgar with Iwaidja in a "Warrkbi" or "Central" subgroup. The relationship between Iwaidja and Garig/Ilgar, according to Evans, is "between divergent sister dialects and very closely related languages". Iwaidja speakers cannot understand Ilgar "clearly". However, Mailhammer and Mark Harvey note that "none of these proposals have a substantial basis in standard historical methodologies", and are thus uncertain whether or not the Iwaidjan languages "demonstrably" comprise a language family. The grammar of Garig and Ilgar is also said to be very similar to both Iwaidja and Mawng. Evans puts the distance between Mawng, Garig/Ilgar, and Iwaidja at about that of the Romance languages. They support the inclusion of Garig and Ilgar within Iwaidjan, but not other languages.

== History ==
As of 2000, only four or five people still spoke Garig/Ilgar. The last speaker, Charlie Wardaga, died in September 2003.

== Phonology ==
=== Consonants ===
Consonants
		Bilabial	Dental	Alveolar	Retroflex	Palatal	Velar
Occlusive	oral	b	(d̪)	d	ɖ	c	g
Occlusive	nasal	m	(n̪)	n	ɳ	ɲ	ŋ
Approximant	median	w			ɻ	j	ɣ
Approximant	lateral			l	ɭ	(ʎ)	
Vibrant	median			r	ɽ		
Vibrant	lateral			ɺ ⟨ld⟩	𝼈 ⟨rld⟩	(ʎ̮)	

The palatal lateral consonants are not confirmed to be phonemic. Dental consonants are only found in loanwords, such as Ilgar mud̪ara 'pearlshell' < Makassarese and Malay mutiara 'pearlshell'. Three rhotic consonants are found in Ilgar.

=== Vowels ===
Evans (1998) briefly discusses vowels in his paper, noting that Iwaidjan languages, including Ilgar, have a three vowel (/a/, /i/, /u/) system, typical of most Australian languages.

	Front	Back
High	i	u
Low	a	
