= Marrgu–Wurrugu languages =

Languages of the Northern Territory

Marrgu–Wurrugu
- (proposed)
- Geographic distribution: Cobourg Peninsula region and Croker Island, Northern Territory
- Linguistic classification: One of the world's primary language families (Iwaidjan ?)
- Subdivisions: Wurrugu; Marrgu

Language codes
- Glottolog: marr1257

The Marrgu–Wurrugu languages are a possible language family of Australian Aboriginal languages spoken in the Cobourg Peninsula region of Western Arnhem Land. They are the extinct Marrgu and Wurrugu languages. They are sometimes classified as distant relatives of the Iwaidjan languages, although Nicholas Evans found the evidence for Marrgu's membership insufficient, concluding that similarities were due to borrowing (including of verbal paradigms).

The genetic grouping of Marrgu and Wurrugu is supported by the following observations:

- Despite being geographically separated by the Garig-Ilgar languages, the two languages share a relatively high cognacy rate (15 out of 43 words = ~35%).
- Both languages contain an interdental phoneme [dh], which is absent in the surrounding Iwaidjan languages.

== Vocabulary ==
Capell (1942) lists the following basic vocabulary items:

gloss	Margu
man	geiag
woman	njunɔn
head	waɽi
eye	daːɭa
nose	ɣïːni
mouth	ŋaɽjad
tongue	ŋaɽjad
stomach	ɣiwud
bone	aruwa
blood	didjaːridj
kangaroo	wïːdjud
opossum	wiːɽiɽin
emu	mangunuba
crow	reimbiriri
fly	mɔlg
sun	muɽi
moon	rana
fire	djuːɳa
smoke	ŋoɭan
water	wobaidj
