= Arnhem Land languages =

Language family in the Northern Territory

Arnhem Land
- (proposed)
- Geographic distribution: northern Australia
- Linguistic classification: Proposed language family
- Subdivisions: Burarran; Iwaidjan; Giimbiyu; Gaagudju; Umbugarla

Language codes
- Glottolog: None
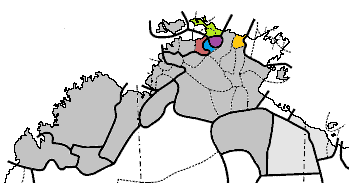
Arnhem Land families:
Yiwaidjan
Giimbiyu
Gaagudju
Umbugarla
Burarran
other non-Pama–Nyungan families

The Arnhem Land languages are a language family proposed by Evans (1997) of Australian languages spoken across northern Arnhem Land.

The name "Arnhem languages" is used by Green (2003) for what Evans calls "Ginwinyguan", and is only tangentially related to this proposal.

The established language families included in this proposal are:

- Burarran
- Iwaidjan
- Giimbiyu (†)
- Gaagudju (†)
- Umbugarla (†)
