= Giimbiyu people =

Indigenous Australian people of the Northern Territory

The Giimbiyu were an indigenous Australian people of the Northern Territory. Their descendants having adopted the Kunwinjku language.

== Language ==
The Giimbiyu consisted of three distinct groups, defined by their different varieties of the Giimbiyu language, Erre, Mangerr and Urningannngg.

== Ethnonym ==
Giimbiyu is a collective term once used by Gaagadju people referring to the three languages formerly spoken around the Alligator Rivers region. In that language it meant 'of the rock country'.

== Country ==
The Giimbiyu's land was around the East Alligator river area, Mount Howship and Red Lily area of the Kakadu National Park west of Gunbalanya (formerly Oenpelli). In the Erre language, this site was called Uwunbarlany, an echo of which survives in the old settlers' term for the area, Oenpelli.

== History ==
With the establishment of a cattle station in the area, the Kunwinjku moved into the area, and renamed it Gunbalanya.

== Notes and references ==
=== References ===
- Garde, Murray (2009). "The language of fire: seasonality, resources and landscape burning on the Arnhem Land Plateau". In Russell-Smith, Jeremy; Whitehead, Peter; Cooke, Peter (eds.). Culture, Ecology and Economy of Fire Management in North Australian Savannas: Rekindling the Wurrk Tradition. Csiro Publishing. pp. 85–164. ISBN 978-0-643-09999-9.
- Garde, Murray (2013). Culture, Interaction and Person Reference in an Australian Language: An ethnography of Bininj Gunwok communication. John Benjamins Publishing. ISBN 978-9-027-27124-2.
- Grimes, B (2003). "Giimbiyu languages". In Frawley, William (ed.). International Encyclopedia of Linguistics: AAVE-Esperanto. Vol. 1. Oxford University Press. p. 96. ISBN 978-0-195-13977-8.
