= Wurrugu language =

Extinct Australian Aboriginal language

Wurrugu
- Popham Bay
- Native to: Australia
- Region: Popham Bay, Northern Territory
- Ethnicity: Wurango
- Era: attested 19th century
- Language family: Marrku–Wurrugu? Iwaidjan?: Wurrugu

Language codes
- ISO 639-3: wur
- Glottolog: wurr1238
- AIATSIS: N37
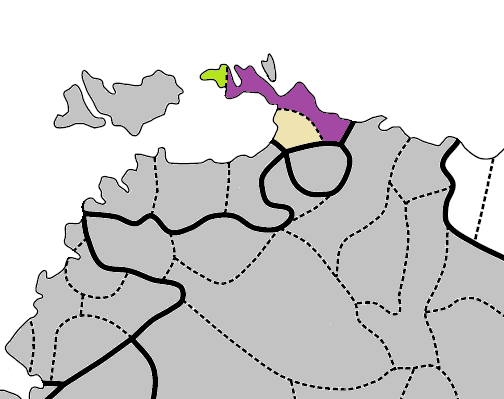
- Wurrugu

The Wurrugu language, or Wurango, also known as the Popham Bay language, is an extinct Australian Aboriginal language. It is known from just a few 19th-century wordlists and one rememberer.

== Vocabulary ==
- naween (father)
- noyoke (mother)

Source: Pasco 1886, p. 269
