= Charlie Mungulda =

Last speaker of the Amurdag language

Charlie Mungulda of Arnhem Land, in the Northern Territory of Australia, is the last native speaker of the Amurdak language in 2007.

Mungulda collaborated on a paper entitled "Survival, Social Cohesion and Rock Art: The Painted Hands of Western Arnhem Land, Australia" published in May 2020, and another in April 2026 titled "The Devil Is in the Detail: Tasmanian Devil and Tasmanian Tiger Paintings From Awunbarna and Injalak Hill, Northern Territory, Australia". As of March 2021, Mungulda's death has not been reported, despite there being no recorded speakers in 2021 of Amurdag. He is affiliated with Davidson's Arnhemland Safaris.
