= Warruwi =

- Town
- Coordinates: 11°38′56.0″S 133°23′23.6″E
- Country: Australia
- State: Northern Territory
- LGA: West Arnhem Region

Government
  - Territory electorate: Arafura
  - Federal division: Lingiari
- Elevation: 19 m (62 ft)

Population
  - Total: 389 (2016 census)
- Postcode: 0822
- Mean max temp: 31.3 °C (88.3 °F)
- Mean min temp: 24.4 °C (75.9 °F)
- Annual rainfall: 1,149.0 mm (45.24 in)

Warruwi is a mostly Aboriginal community located on South Goulburn Island, off Arnhem Land, in the West Arnhem Region of the Northern Territory of Australia. It is 290 km (180 mi) north-east of Darwin and 100 km (62 mi) north-east of Jabiru.

At the 2016 census, Warruwi and its surrounding outstations had a population of 389. There is a school, health clinic, arts centre and other facilities. FlyTiwi has a daily passenger flight to Darwin from the airport, while freight is carried on a barge which runs weekly.

The traditional owners of the Goulburn Islands are the Maung people, and languages spoken on the island include Mawng, Kunbarlang, Kunwinjku, Djambarrpuyngu and Galpu, as well as Australian English.

== Climate ==
Warruwi has a tropical savanna climate (Köppen: Aw) with a wet season from November to April and a dry season from May to October. On average, the town experiences 86.3 clear days and 104.3 cloudy days per annum. Extreme temperatures ranged from 38.0 °C (100.4 °F) on 23 October 1979 to 15.3 °C (59.5 °F) on 28 June 1988. The wettest recorded day was 7 January 1934 with 266.2 mm (10.48 in) of rainfall.

Climate data for Warruwi Airport (11.65°S 133.38°E) (19 m (62 ft) AMSL) (1916-2025)
Month	Jan	Feb	Mar	Apr	May	Jun	Jul	Aug	Sep	Oct	Nov	Dec	Year
Record high °C (°F)	37.7 (99.9)	36.4 (97.5)	36.0 (96.8)	35.5 (95.9)	34.4 (93.9)	33.1 (91.6)	32.9 (91.2)	33.9 (93.0)	37.0 (98.6)	38.0 (100.4)	37.7 (99.9)	37.7 (99.9)	38.0 (100.4)
Mean daily maximum °C (°F)	32.2 (90.0)	31.6 (88.9)	31.6 (88.9)	31.7 (89.1)	30.9 (87.6)	29.4 (84.9)	28.8 (83.8)	29.4 (84.9)	31.0 (87.8)	32.6 (90.7)	33.7 (92.7)	33.2 (91.8)	31.3 (88.4)
Mean daily minimum °C (°F)	25.7 (78.3)	25.4 (77.7)	25.3 (77.5)	25.1 (77.2)	24.1 (75.4)	22.1 (71.8)	21.4 (70.5)	21.8 (71.2)	23.7 (74.7)	25.4 (77.7)	26.4 (79.5)	26.3 (79.3)	24.4 (75.9)
Record low °C (°F)	17.9 (64.2)	15.8 (60.4)	20.3 (68.5)	18.3 (64.9)	17.8 (64.0)	15.3 (59.5)	15.5 (59.9)	15.8 (60.4)	18.0 (64.4)	19.4 (66.9)	20.5 (68.9)	21.1 (70.0)	15.3 (59.5)
Average precipitation mm (inches)	263.2 (10.36)	231.9 (9.13)	235.1 (9.26)	115.5 (4.55)	15.5 (0.61)	2.2 (0.09)	1.7 (0.07)	0.6 (0.02)	2.6 (0.10)	12.2 (0.48)	58.1 (2.29)	199.1 (7.84)	1,149 (45.24)
Average precipitation days (≥ 0.2 mm)	16.6	16.3	16.2	8.5	2.7	0.7	0.4	0.3	0.5	1.7	5.3	12.0	81.2
Average afternoon relative humidity (%)	73	75	71	67	63	60	60	59	59	59	60	65	64
Average dew point °C (°F)	24.9 (76.8)	25.0 (77.0)	24.7 (76.5)	23.4 (74.1)	21.7 (71.1)	19.5 (67.1)	18.8 (65.8)	19.1 (66.4)	20.5 (68.9)	22.0 (71.6)	23.4 (74.1)	24.4 (75.9)	22.3 (72.1)
Source: Bureau of Meteorology (1916-2025)
