= Australian Aboriginal languages =

Indigenous languages of Australia

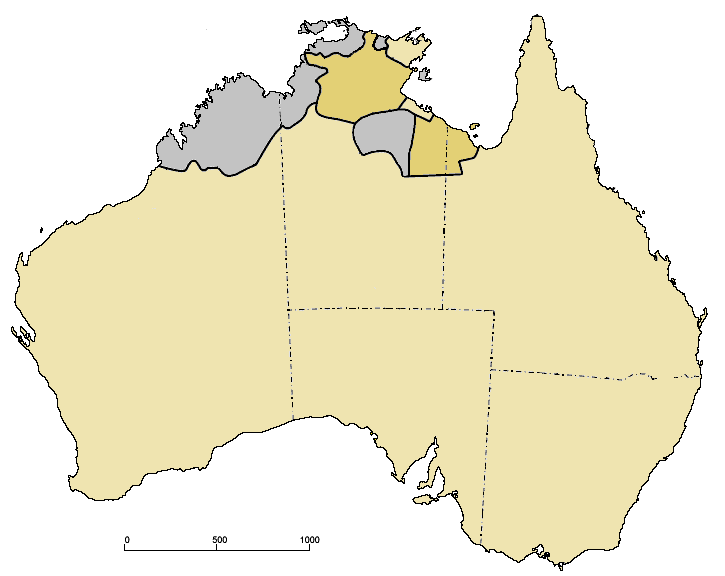
The primary typological division in Australian languages: Pama–Nyungan languages (tan) and non-Pama–Nyungan languages (mustard and grey)

People who speak Australian Aboriginal languages as a percentage of the population in Australia, divided geographically by statistical local area at the 2011 census

Australian Aboriginal languages are those languages spoken by Australian Aboriginal people. There are more than 250 distinct languages.

Australian languages have historically been classified into numerous language families. The largest single language family is the Pama-Nyungan family, which covers approximately seven eighths of the continent; the remaining languages sometimes called "non-Pama-Nyungan" as a term of convenience, are clustered together in the north-west, and have been classified into over twenty separate families.

Despite the diversity of Australian languages, many linguists have considered for decades that most languages of the Australian continent, including Pama-Nyungan, are members of one higher-level family. A proto-language, Proto-Australian, was reconstructed for the first time in 2024. Proto-Australian is dated to approximately 6,000 years before the present; how it spread across the continent, replacing earlier languages, is as yet unclear.

There have always been some Australian languages excluded from larger groupings as language isolates; currently, Tiwi and the Tasmanian languages are considered unrelated to Proto-Australian.

Of the languages of the Torres Strait, Kala Lagaw Ya is a Pama-Nyungan language, while Meriam Mer is a Papuan language.

At the start of the 21st century, fewer than 150 Aboriginal languages remained in daily use, with the majority being highly endangered. In 2020, 90 percent of the barely more than 100 languages still spoken are considered endangered. Thirteen languages are still being acquired by children. The surviving languages are located in the most isolated areas. Of the five least endangered Western Australian Aboriginal languages, four belong to the Western Desert grouping of the Central and Great Victoria Desert.

In 2026 the most widely-spoken languages by Australian Aboriginal people are those whose origins post-date the colonisation of Australia; these languages include Australian Kriol, Australian Aboriginal English, and Light Warlpiri.

== Number of languages ==
The Indigenous languages of Australia number in the hundreds, the precise number being quite uncertain, although there is a range of estimates from a minimum of around 250 up to possibly 363.

== Living Aboriginal languages ==
At the start of the 21st century, fewer than 150 Aboriginal languages remained in daily use, with the majority being highly endangered. In 2020, 90 per cent of the barely more than 100 languages still spoken are considered endangered. Thirteen languages are still being acquired by children. The surviving languages are located in the most isolated areas. Of the five least endangered Western Australian Aboriginal languages, four belong to the Western Desert grouping of the Central and Great Victoria Desert.

Yolŋu languages from north-east Arnhem Land are also currently learned by children. Bilingual education is being used successfully in some communities. Seven of the most widely spoken Australian languages, such as Warlpiri, Murrinh-patha and Tiwi, retain between 1,000 and 3,000 speakers. Some Indigenous communities and linguists show support for learning programmes either for language revival proper or for only "post-vernacular maintenance" (Indigenous communities having the opportunity to learn some words and concepts related to the lost language).

Percentage of people in each local government area of the Northern Territory who speak an Aboriginal language at home, according to the 2021 census: <20.0% 20.0%–29.9% 30.0%–39.9% 40.0%–49.9% 50.0%–59.9% 60.0%–69.9% 70.0%–79.9% >80.0%

The National Indigenous Languages Survey is a regular Australia-wide survey of the status of Aboriginal and Torres Strait Islander languages conducted in 2005, 2014 and 2019.

Languages with more than 100 speakers:

- New South Wales:
  - 3 languages (~ 600):
    - Yugambeh-Bundjalung
      - Bundjalung (~ 100)
      - Yugambeh (~ 20; shared with Queensland)
      - Githabul (~ 10; shared with Queensland)
    - Wiradjuri (~ 500)
    - Gamilaraay (~ 100)
- South Australia:
  - 4 languages (~ 3,900):
    - Ngarrindjeri (~ 300)
    - Adyamathanha (~ 100)
    - Yankunytjatjara (~ 400)
    - Pitjantjatjara (~ 3,100; shared with Northern Territory and Western Australia)
- Queensland:
  - 5 languages (~ 1,800):
    - Kuku Yalanji (~ 300)
    - Guugu Yimidhirr (~ 800)
    - Kuuk Thaayore (~ 300)
    - Wik Mungkan (~ 400)
- Western Australia:
  - 17 languages (~ 8,000):
    - Noongar (~ 500)
    - Wangkatha (~ 300)
    - Ngaanyatjarra (~ 1,000)
    - Manytjilyitjarra (~ 100)
    - Martu Wangka (~ 700)
    - Panyjima (~ 100)
    - Yinjibarndi (~ 400)
    - Nyangumarta (~ 200)
    - Bardi (~ 400)
    - Wajarri (~ 100)
    - Pintupi (~ 100; shared with Northern Territory)
    - Pitjantjatjara (~3,100; shared with Northern Territory and South Australia)
    - Kukatja (~ 100)
    - Walmatjarri (~ 300)
    - Gooniyandi (~ 100)
    - Djaru (~ 200)
    - Kija (~ 200)
    - Miriwoong (~ 200)
- Northern Territory:
  - 19 languages (~ 28,100):
    - Luritja (~ 1,000)
    - Upper Arrernte (~ 4,500)
    - Warlpiri (~ 2,300)
    - Kaytetye (~ 100)
    - Warumungu (~ 300)
    - Gurindji (~ 400)
    - Murrinh Patha (~ 2,000)
    - Tiwi (~ 2,000)
    - Pintupi (~ 100; shared with Western Australia)
    - Pitjantjatjara (~3,100; shared with Western Australia and South Australia)
    - Iwaidja (~ 100)
    - Maung (~ 400)
    - Kunwinjku (~ 1,800)
    - Burarra (~ 1,000)
    - Dhuwal (~4,200)
    - Djinang (~ 100)
    - Nunggubuyu (~ 300)
    - Anindilyakwa (~ 1,500)

Total 47 languages, 42,300 speakers, with 11 having only approximately 100. 11 languages have over 1,000 speakers.

- Creoles:
  - Kriol (~ 20,000)

== Classification ==
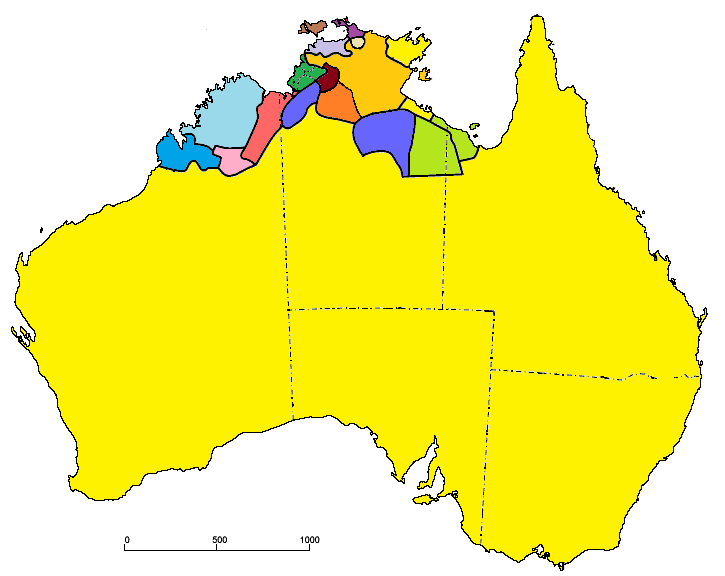
Australian language families. From west to east: Nyulnyulan Worrorran Bunuban Jarrakan Mindi (2 areas) Daly (4 families) Wagiman Wardaman Tiwi (offshore) Darwin Region Iwaidjan Giimbiyu Arnhem, incl. Gunwinyguan Garawan and Tangkic Pama–Nyungan (3 areas)

=== Internal ===
Most Australian languages are commonly held to belong to the Pama–Nyungan family, a family accepted by most linguists, with Robert M. W. Dixon as a notable exception. For convenience, the rest of the languages, all spoken in the far north, are commonly lumped together as "Non-Pama–Nyungan", although this does not necessarily imply that they constitute a valid clade. Dixon argues that after perhaps 40,000 years of mutual influence and only a few centuries of written records, it is no longer possible to distinguish deep genealogical relationships from areal features in Australia, and that not even Pama–Nyungan is a valid language family.

However, few other linguists accept Dixon's thesis. For example, Kenneth L. Hale describes Dixon's scepticism as an erroneous phylogenetic assessment which is "such an insult to the eminently successful practitioners of Comparative Method Linguistics in Australia, that it positively demands a decisive riposte". Hale provides pronominal and grammatical evidence (with suppletion) as well as more than fifty basic-vocabulary cognates (showing regular sound correspondences) between the proto-Northern-and-Middle Pamic (pNMP) family of the Cape York Peninsula on the Australian northeast coast and proto-Ngayarta of the Australian west coast, some 3,000 kilometres (1,900 mi) apart, to support the Pama–Nyungan grouping, whose age he compares to that of Proto-Indo-European.

Johanna Nichols suggests that the northern families may be relatively recent arrivals from Maritime Southeast Asia, perhaps later replaced there by the spread of Austronesian. That could explain the typological difference between Pama–Nyungan and non-Pama–Nyungan languages, but not how a single family came to be so widespread. Nicholas Evans suggests that the Pama–Nyungan family spread along with the now-dominant Aboriginal culture that includes the Australian Aboriginal kinship system.

In late 2017, Mark Harvey and Robert Mailhammer published a study in Diachronica that hypothesised, by analysing noun class prefix paradigms across both Pama-Nyungan and the minority non-Pama-Nyungan languages, that a Proto-Australian could be reconstructed from which all known Australian languages descend. This Proto-Australian language, they concluded, would have been spoken about 12,000 years ago in northern Australia. In 2024, Harvey and Mailhammer published a book-length reconstruction of Proto-Australian.

=== External ===
For a long time unsuccessful attempts were made to detect a link between Australian and Papuan languages, the latter being represented by those spoken on the coastal areas of New Guinea facing the Torres Strait and the Arafura Sea. In 1986 William A. Foley noted lexical similarities between Robert M. W. Dixon's 1980 reconstruction of proto-Australian and the East New Guinea Highlands languages. He believed that it was naïve to expect to find a single Papuan or Australian language family when New Guinea and Australia had been a single landmass (called the Sahul continent) for most of their human history, having been separated by the Torres Strait only 8000 years ago, and that a deep reconstruction would likely include languages from both. Dixon, in the meantime, later abandoned his proto-Australian proposal.

=== Families ===
==== Glottolog 4.1 (2019) ====
Glottolog 4.1 (2019) recognises 23 independent families and 9 isolates in Australia, comprising a total of 32 independent language groups.

Families (23)

- Pama-Nyungan (248)
- Gunwinyguan (12)
- Western Daly (11)
- Nyulnyulan (10)
- Worrorran (10)
- Mirndi (5)
- Iwaidjan Proper (4)
- Mangarrayi-Maran (4)
- Maningrida (4)
- Tangkic (4)
- Giimbiyu (3) (extinct)
- Jarrakan (3)
- Yangmanic (3)
- Bunaban (2)
- Eastern Daly (2) (extinct)
- Northern Daly (2)
- Southern Daly (2)
- Garrwan (2)
- Limilngan-Wulna (2) (extinct; would be moribund if Laragiya were included as it is in other breakdowns)
- Marrku-Wurrugu (2) (extinct)
- North-Eastern Tasmanian (2) (extinct)
- South-Eastern Tasmanian (2) (extinct)
- Western Tasmanian (2) (extinct)

Isolates (9)

- Gaagudju (extinct)
- Kungarakany (extinct)
- Laragia (moribund)
- Minkin (extinct)
- Oyster Bay-Big River-Little Swanport (extinct)
- Tiwi
- Umbugarla (extinct)
- Wadjiginy (moribund)
- Wageman (moribund)

==== Bowern (2011) ====
According to Claire Bowern's Australian Languages (2011), Australian languages divide into approximately 30 primary sub-groups and 5 isolates, comprising a total of 35 independent language groups.

- Presumptive isolates:
  - Tiwi
  - Giimbiyu (extinct)
  - Marrgu (extinct)
  - Wagiman (moribund)
  - Wardaman
- Previously established families:
  - Bunuban (2)
  - Daly (four to five families, with 11–19 languages)
  - Iwaidjan (3–7)
  - Jarrakan (3–5)
  - Nyulnyulan (8)
  - Worrorran (7–12)
- Newly proposed families:
  - Mirndi (5–7)
  - Darwin Region (4)
  - Macro-Gunwinyguan languages (22)
  - Greater Pama–Nyungan:
    - Tangkic (5)
    - Garawan (3)
    - Pama–Nyungan proper (approximately 270 languages)
  - Western and Northern Tasmanian (extinct)
  - Northeastern Tasmanian (extinct)
  - Eastern Tasmanian (extinct)

=== History ===
In 1962, Arthur Capell gave his assessment of the origins and internal grouping of Aboriginal languages. He referred to many attempts having been made to link the Australian languages to other parts of the world, including the Dravidian languages of South India, those of the Andaman Islands, and African languages. "All must be regarded as failures. In fact, it seems quite possible to explain the multiple forms of languages in Australia on the basis of a single original."

Capell proposed 5 main groupings as clear at the time, referring to earlier classifications by Schmidt (1914–19) and Kroeber (1923):

1. Prefixing languages (Kimberleys and north Australia)
2. Western Desert Languages
3. Aranda (Arrernte)(Central Australia)
4. Victoria with New South Wales south coastal region
5. Unclassified groups occupying the bulk of Queensland and New South Wales.

In 1967 Carl Georg von Brandenstein claimed that he had isolated and identified some sixty Portuguese language loanwords in several indigenous languages of Australia's far north. Australian linguists have generally dismissed these conclusions, except perhaps for the word tartaruga. Nick Thieberger, a Melbourne University linguist, argues that Brandenstein's approach was still strongly influenced by outdated nineteenth-century linguistic thinking.

== Survival ==
It has been inferred from the probable number of languages and the estimate of pre-contact population levels that there may have been from 3,000 to 4,000 speakers on average for each of the 250 languages. A number of these languages were almost immediately wiped out within decades of colonisation, the case of the Aboriginal Tasmanians being a notorious example. Tasmania had been separated from the mainland at the end of the Quaternary glaciation, and Indigenous Tasmanians remained isolated from the outside world for around 12,000 years. Claire Bowern has concluded in a recent study that there were twelve Tasmanian languages, and that those languages are unrelated (that is, not demonstrably related) to those on the Australian mainland.

In 1990 it was estimated that 90 languages still survived of the approximately 250 once spoken, but with a high rate of attrition as elders died out. Of the 90, 70% by 2001 were judged as 'severely endangered' with only 17 spoken by all age groups, a definition of a 'strong' language. On these grounds it is anticipated that despite efforts at linguistic preservation, many of the remaining languages will disappear within the next generation. The overall trend suggests that in the not too distant future all of the Indigenous languages will be lost, perhaps by 2050, and with them the cultural knowledge they convey.

During the period of the Stolen Generations, Aboriginal children were removed from their families and placed in institutions where they were punished for speaking their Indigenous language. Different, mutually unintelligible language groups were often mixed together, with Australian Aboriginal English or Australian Kriol language as the only lingua franca. The result was a disruption to the inter-generational transmission of these languages that severely impacted their future use. Today, that same transmission of language between parents and grandparents to their children is a key mechanism for reversing language shift. There is some evidence to suggest that the reversal of the Indigenous language shift may lead to decreased self-harm and suicide rates among Indigenous youth.

The first Aboriginal people to use Australian Aboriginal languages in the Australian parliament were Aden Ridgeway on 25 August 1999 in the Senate when he said "On this special occasion, I make my presence known as an Aborigine and to this chamber I say, perhaps for the first time: Nyandi baaliga Jaingatti. Nyandi mimiga Gumbayynggir. Nya jawgar yaam Gumbayynggir." (Translation: My father is Dhunghutti. My mother is Gumbayynggir. And, therefore, I am Gumbayynggir.) In the House of Representatives on 31 August 2016 Linda Burney gave an acknowledgment of country in Wiradjuri in her first speech and was sung in by Lynette Riley in Wiradjuri from the public gallery.

=== Preservation measures ===
2019 was the International Year of Indigenous Languages (IYIL2019), as declared by the United Nations General Assembly. The commemoration was used to raise awareness of and support for the preservation of Aboriginal languages within Australia, including spreading knowledge about the importance of each language to the identity and knowledge of Indigenous groups. Warrgamay/Girramay man Troy Wyles-Whelan joined the North Queensland Regional Aboriginal Corporation Language Centre (NQRACLC) in 2008, and has been contributing oral histories and the results of his own research to their database. As part of the efforts to raise awareness of the Wiradjuri language, a Grammar of Wiradjuri language was published in 2014 and A new Wiradjuri dictionary in 2010.

The New South Wales Aboriginal Languages Act 2017 became law on 24 October 2017 and established a board to advise on the preservation of Aboriginal languages that is known as the Aboriginal Languages Trust. It was the first legislation in Australia to acknowledge the significance of first languages.

In 2019 the Royal Australian Mint issued a 50-cent coin to celebrate the International Year of Indigenous Languages which features 14 different words for "money" from Australian Indigenous languages. The coin was designed by Aleksandra Stokic in consultation with Indigenous language custodian groups.

The work of digitising and transcribing many word lists created by ethnographer Daisy Bates in the 1900s at Daisy Bates Online provides a valuable resource for those researching especially Western Australian languages, and some languages of the Northern Territory and South Australia. The project is co-ordinated by Nick Thieberger, who works in collaboration with the National Library of Australia "to have all the microfilmed images from Section XII of the Bates papers digitised". The project is succeeded by the Nyingarn Project , which digitises manuscripts and crowdsources transcriptions through DigiVol.

=== Language revival ===
In recent decades, there have been attempts to revive indigenous languages. Significant challenges exist, however, for the revival of languages in the dominant English language culture of Australia.

The Kaurna language, spoken by the Kaurna people of the Adelaide plains, has been the subject of a concerted revival movement since the 1980s, coordinated by Kaurna Warra Pintyanthi, a unit working out of the University of Adelaide. The language had rapidly disappeared after the settlement of South Australia and the breaking up of local indigenous people. Ivaritji, the last known speaker of the language, died in 1931. However, a substantial number of primary source records existed for the language, from which the language was reconstructed.

The Tasmanian Aboriginal Centre, in collaboration with the University of Tasmania and the wider Aboriginal community, is undergoing the process of reviving Traditional Tasmanian languages through the construction of palawa kani (trans. "Tasmanian Aborigines speak"). The palawa kani Language Program has been in the works since the early 1990s. Due to the linguistic ethnocide of Aboriginal Tasmanians, palawa kani is the only Aboriginal language of Lutruwita/Tasmania today.

== Common features ==
"Some Aboriginal people distinguish between usership and ownership. There are even those who claim that they own a language although they only know one single word of it: its name."

Whether it is due to genetic unity or some other factor such as occasional contact, typologically the Australian languages form a language area or Sprachbund, sharing much of their vocabulary and many distinctive phonological features across the entire continent.

A common feature of many Australian languages is that they display so-called avoidance speech, special speech registers used only in the presence of certain close relatives. These registers share the phonology and grammar of the standard language, but the lexicon is different and usually very restricted. There are also commonly speech taboos during extended periods of mourning or initiation that have led to numerous Aboriginal sign languages.

For morphosyntactic alignment, many Australian languages have ergative–absolutive case systems. These are typically split systems; a widespread pattern is for pronouns (or first and second persons) to have nominative–accusative case marking and for third person to be ergative–absolutive, though splits between animate and inanimate are also found. In some languages the persons in between the accusative and ergative inflections (such as second person, or third-person human) may be tripartite: that is, marked overtly as either ergative or accusative in transitive clauses, but not marked as either in intransitive clauses. There are also a few languages which employ only nominative–accusative case marking.

=== Phonetics and phonology ===
==== Consonants ====
The following table represents a canonical 6-place Australian Aboriginal consonant system. It does not represent any single language, but is instead a simplified form of the consonant inventory of what would be found in many Australian languages, including most Arandic and Yolŋu languages.

		Peripheral		Coronal			
		Peripheral		Apical		Laminal	
		Bilabial	Velar	Alveolar	Retroflex	Dental	Alveolo-palatal
Obstruent	Plosive	p	k	t	ʈ	t̪	ȶ
Sonorant	Nasal	m	ŋ	n	ɳ	n̪	ȵ
Sonorant	Lateral			l	ɭ	l̪	ȴ
Sonorant	Rhotic			r	ɻ		
Sonorant	Glide	w				j	

There is almost never a voicing contrast; that is, a consonant may sound like a [p] at the beginning of a word, but like a [b] between vowels, and either letter could be (and often is) chosen to represent it. Australia also stands out as being almost entirely free of fricative consonants, even of the commonplace [s]. In the few cases where fricatives do occur, they developed recently through the lenition (weakening) of stops, and are therefore non-sibilants like [ð] rather than the sibilants like [s] that are common elsewhere in the world. Some languages also have three rhotics, typically a flap, a trill, and an approximant (that is, like the combined rhotics of English and Spanish) and many have four laterals.

Besides the lack of fricatives, the most striking feature of Australian speech sounds is the large number of places of articulation. Some 10-15% of Australian languages have four places of articulation, with two coronal places of articulation, 40-50% have five places, and 40-45% have six places of articulation, including four coronals. The four-way distinction in the coronal region is commonly accomplished through two variables: the position of the tongue (front, alveolar or dental, or retroflex), and its shape (apical or laminal). There are also bilabial, velar and often palatal consonants, but a complete absence of uvular consonants and only a few languages with a glottal stop. Both stops and nasals occur at all six places, and in many languages laterals occur at all four coronal places.

A language which displays the full range of stops, nasals and laterals is Kalkatungu, which has labial p, m; "dental" th, nh, lh; "alveolar" t, n, l; "retroflex" rt, rn, rl; "palatal" ty, ny, ly; and velar k, ng. Wangganguru has all this, as well as three rhotics. Yanyuwa has even more contrasts, with an additional true dorso-palatal series, plus prenasalised consonants at all seven places of articulation, in addition to all four laterals.

A notable exception to the above generalisations is Kalaw Lagaw Ya, spoken in the Torres Strait Islands, which has an inventory more like its Papuan neighbours than the languages of the Australian mainland, including full voice contrasts: /p b/, dental /t̪ d̪/, alveolar /t d/, the sibilants /s z/ (which have allophonic variation with [tʃ] and [dʒ] respectively) and velar /k ɡ/, as well as only one rhotic, one lateral and three nasals (labial, dental and velar) in contrast to the 5 places of articulation of stops/sibilants. Where vowels are concerned, it has 8 vowels with some morpho-syntactic as well as phonemic length contrasts (i iː, e eː, a aː, ə əː, ɔ ɔː, o oː, ʊ ʊː, u uː), and glides that distinguish between those that are in origin vowels, and those that in origin are consonants. Kunjen and other neighbouring languages have also developed contrasting aspirated consonants ([pʰ], [t̪ʰ], [tʰ], [cʰ], [kʰ]) not found further south.

==== Coronal consonants ====
Descriptions of the coronal articulations can be inconsistent.

The alveolar series t, n, l (or d, n, l) is straightforward: across the continent, these sounds are alveolar (that is, pronounced by touching the tongue to the ridge just behind the gum line of the upper teeth) and apical (that is, touching that ridge with the tip of the tongue). This is very similar to English t, d, n, l, though the Australian t is not aspirated, even in Kalaw Lagaw Ya, despite its other stops being aspirated.

The other apical series is the retroflex, rt, rn, rl (or rd, rn, rl). Here the place is further back in the mouth, in the postalveolar or prepalatal region. The articulation is actually most commonly subapical; that is, the tongue curls back so that the underside of the tip makes contact. That is, they are true retroflex consonants. It has been suggested that subapical pronunciation is characteristic of more careful speech, while these sounds tend to be apical in rapid speech. Kalaw Lagaw Ya and many other languages in North Queensland differ from most other Australian languages in not having a retroflexive series.

The dental series th, nh, lh are always laminal (that is, pronounced by touching with the surface of the tongue just above the tip, called the blade of the tongue), but may be formed in one of three different ways, depending on the language, on the speaker, and on how carefully the speaker pronounces the sound. These are interdental with the tip of the tongue visible between the teeth, as in th in English; dental with the tip of the tongue down behind the lower teeth, so that the blade is visible between the teeth; and denti-alveolar, that is, with both the tip and the blade making contact with the back of the upper teeth and alveolar ridge, as in French t, d, n, l. The first tends to be used in careful enunciation, and the last in more rapid speech, while the tongue-down articulation is less common.

Finally, the palatal series ty, ny, ly. (The stop is often spelled dj, tj, or j.) Here the contact is also laminal, but further back, spanning the alveolar to postalveolar, or the postalveolar to prepalatal regions. The tip of the tongue is typically down behind the lower teeth. This is similar to the "closed" articulation of Circassian fricatives (see Postalveolar consonant). The body of the tongue is raised towards the palate. This is similar to the "domed" English postalveolar fricative sh. Because the tongue is "peeled" from the roof of the mouth from back to front during the release of these stops, there is a fair amount of frication, giving the ty something of the impression of the English palato-alveolar affricate ch or the Polish alveolo-palatal affricate ć. That is, these consonants are not palatal in the IPA sense of the term, and indeed they contrast with true palatals in Yanyuwa. In Kalaw Lagaw Ya, the palatal consonants are sub-phonemes of the alveolar sibilants /s/ and /z/.

These descriptions do not apply exactly to all Australian languages, as the notes regarding Kalaw Lagaw Ya demonstrate. However, they do describe most of them, and are the expected norm against which languages are compared.

==== Vowels ====
Aboriginal languages typically have three vowels, usually /i, u, a/, which may be lengthened. In a few cases the [u] has been unrounded to give [i, ɯ, a].

Over 75% of Aboriginal languages have between 3 and 6 vowel phonemes; 98% have ten or fewer. Only 5 languages have ten or more phonemic vowels: Kwini and Wunambal have 11, Wik-Ngathan and Mbabaram have 12, and Anguthimri has 17.

No Aboriginal language contrasts between rounded and unrounded back vowels, and fewer than 1% contrast between rounded and unrounded front vowels. Only one language, Anguthimri, has phonemic nasal vowels.

==== Phonotactics ====
Some have suggested that the most appropriate unit to describe the phonotactics of Australian languages is the phonological word. The most common word length is two syllables, and a typical phonological word would have the form:

(C_{INIT})V_{1}C_{1}(C_{2})V_{2}(C_{FIN})

with the first syllable being stressed. The optionality of C_{FIN} is cross-linguistically normal, since coda consonants are weak or nonexistent in many languages, as well as in the early stages of language acquisition. The weakening of C_{INIT}, on the other hand, is very unusual. No Australian language has consonant clusters in this position, and those languages with fortis and lenis distinctions do not make such distinctions in this position. Place of articulation distinctions are also less common in this position, and lenitions and deletions are historically common here. While in most languages the word-initial position is prominent, maintaining all a language's contrasts, that is not the case in Australia. Here the prominent position is C_{1}(C_{2}), in the middle of the word. C_{1} is typically the only position allowing all of a language's place of articulation contrasts. Fortis/lenis contrasts can only occur at C_{1}, or at C_{2} when C_{1} is a sonorant. Consonant clusters are often restricted to the C_{1}(C_{2}) position, and are most commonly sonorant + obstruent sequences. In languages with pre-stopped nasals or laterals, those sounds only occur at C_{1}.

Australian languages typically resist certain connected speech processes which might blur the place of articulation of consonants at C_{1}(C_{2}), such as anticipatory assimilation of place of articulation, which is common around the world. In Australia, this type of assimilation seems only to have affected consonants within the apical and laminal categories. There's little evidence of assimilation between the labial, apical, laminal, and dorsal categories. Many proto-Pama–Nyungan /-np-/ and /-nk-/ clusters have been preserved across Australia. Heterorganic nasal + stop sequences remain stable even in modern connected speech, which is highly unusual.

The anticipatory assimilation of nasality is quite common in various languages around the world. Typically, a vowel will become nasalized before a following nasal consonant. However, this process is resisted in Australian languages. There was a historical process in many languages where nasal + stop C_{1}C_{2} clusters lost the nasal element if C_{INIT} was a nasal. Also, many languages have morphophonemic alterations whereby initial nasals in suffixes are denasalized if the preceding stem contains a nasal consonant. While the existence of phonemic pre-stopped nasals and laterals, contrasting with plain nasals and laterals, has been documented in some Australian languages, nasals and laterals are pre-stopped on a phonetic level in most languages of the continent. These phenomena are the result of a general resistance to the anticipatory assimilation of nasality and laterality. The lack of assimilation makes coda nasals and laterals more acoustically distinct.

==== Phonation ====
Most speakers of Australian languages speak with a 'pressed' voice quality, with the glottal opening narrower than in modal voice, a relatively high frequency of creaky voice, and low airflow. This may be due to an avoidance of breathy voice. This pressed quality could therefore serve to enhance the clarity of speech and ensure the perception of place of articulation distinctions.

== Orthography ==
Probably every Australian language with speakers remaining has had an orthography developed for it, in each case in the Latin script. Sounds not found in English are usually represented by digraphs, or more rarely by diacritics, such as underlines, or extra symbols, sometimes borrowed from the International Phonetic Alphabet. Some examples are shown in the following table.

Language	Example	Translation	Type
Pitjantjatjara	paṉa	'earth, dirt, ground; land'	diacritic (underline) indicates retroflex 'n'
Wajarri	nhanha	'this, this one'	digraph indicating 'n' with dental articulation
Yolŋu	yolŋu	'person, man'	'ŋ' (from IPA) for velar nasal

== Demographics (2016) ==
In the Northern Territory, 62.5% of Aboriginal Australians spoke an indigenous language at home in 2016. In Queensland, almost 95% of Torres Strait Islanders spoke an indigenous language at home in 2016.

Place	Population that speaks an Indigenous language	Percentage that speaks an Indigenous language
Torres Strait Islands	3,159	69.9%
Northern Territory	34,956	15%
Western Australia	10,251	0.4%
Queensland	13,474	0.3%
South Australia	3,392	0.2%
New South Wales	1,922	0%
Victoria	526	0%
Australian Capital Territory	132	0%
Tasmania	70	0%

== Notable linguists ==
A number of linguists and ethnographers have contributed greatly to the sum of knowledge about Australian languages. Of particular note are:

- Barry Blake
- Claire Bowern
- Gavan Breen
- Arthur Capell
- R. M. W. Dixon
- Kenneth Hale
- Margaret Heffernan
- Luise Hercus
- David Nash
- Lynette Oates (1921–2013)
- Nicholas Evans
- Rachel Nordlinger

== See also ==
- Aboriginal Australians
- Australian Aboriginal sign languages
- List of Aboriginal Australian group names
- List of Australian Aboriginal languages
- List of Aboriginal languages of New South Wales
- List of Australian place names of Aboriginal origin
- List of endangered languages with mobile apps
- List of reduplicated Australian place names
- Living Archive of Aboriginal Languages
- Macro-Gunwinyguan languages
- Macro-Pama–Nyungan languages
- Proto-Australian language

== Sources ==
- "Australia's indigenous languages have one source, study says". BBC News. 28 March 2018. Archived from the original on 28 June 2018.
- Bowern, C. 2011. Oxford Bibliographies Online: Australian Languages Archived 1 July 2017 at the Wayback Machine
- Bowern, Claire (23 December 2011). "How many languages were spoken in Australia?". Anggarrgoon. Archived from the original on 3 February 2019.
- Bowern, Claire (2012). "The riddle of Tasmanian languages". Proceedings of the Royal Society B. 279 (1747): 4590–4595. doi:10.1098/rspb.2012.1842. PMC 3479735. PMID 23015621.
- Bowern, Claire; Atkinson, Quentin (2012). "Computational Phylogenetics and the Internal Structure of Pama-Nyungan". Language. 84 (4): 817–845. doi:10.1353/lan.2012.0081. S2CID 4375648.
- Butcher, Andrew R. (2018). "The special nature of Australian phonologies: Why auditory constraints on human language sound systems are not universal". Proceedings of Meetings on Acoustics. 176th Meeting of Acoustical Society of America. 177th Meeting of the Acoustical Society of America. Vol. 35. Acoustical Society of America. p. 060004. doi:10.1121/2.0001004.
- Dalby, Andrew (2015). Dictionary of Languages: The definitive reference to more than 400 languages. Bloomsbury Publishing. ISBN 978-1-408-10214-5. Archived from the original on 23 December 2019.
- Dixon, R. M. W. (1980). The Languages of Australia. Cambridge University Press. ISBN 978-0-521-29450-8. Archived from the original on 22 December 2019.
- Dixon, R. M. W. (2002). Australian Languages: Their Nature and Development. Vol. 1. Cambridge University Press. ISBN 978-0-521-47378-1. Archived from the original on 21 December 2019.
- Dixon, R. M. W. (2011). Searching for Aboriginal Languages: Memoirs of a Field Worker. Cambridge University Press. ISBN 978-1-108-02504-1. Archived from the original on 1 December 2019.
- Evans, Nicholas, ed. (2003). The Non-Pama-Nyungan Languages of Northern Australia: Comparative Studies of the Continent's Most Linguistically Complex Region. Pacific Linguistics, Research School of Pacific and Asian Studies, Australian National University. ISBN 978-0-858-83538-2. Archived from the original on 17 April 2021.
- Forrest, Walter (June 2017). "The intergenerational transmission of Australian Indigenous languages: why language maintenance programmes should be family-focused". Ethnic and Racial Studies. 41 (2): 303–323. doi:10.1080/01419870.2017.1334938. S2CID 149318200.
- Goldsworthy, Anna (September 2014). "In Port Augusta, an Israeli linguist is helping the Barngarla people reclaim their language". The Monthly. Archived from the original on 11 March 2016.
- Hallett, Darcy; Chandler, Michael J.; Lalonde, Christopher E. (July–September 2007). "Aboriginal language knowledge and youth suicide". Cognitive Development. 22 (3): 392–399. doi:10.1016/j.cogdev.2007.02.001.
- Harvey, Mark; Mailhammer, Robert (2017). "Reconstructing remote relationships: Proto-Australian noun class prefixation". Diachronica. 34 (4): 470–515. doi:10.1163/187740911x558798. Archived from the original on 17 January 2020.
- Hunter, Jessica; Bowern, Claire; Round, Erich (2011). "Reappraising the Effects of Language Contact in the Torres Strait". Journal of Language Contact. 4 (1): 106–140. doi:10.1163/187740911x558798. Archived from the original on 7 November 2021.
- *Marchese, David (28 March 2018). "Indigenous languages come from just one common ancestor, researchers say". Australian Broadcasting Corporation. Archived from the original on 30 March 2018.
- McConvell, P.; Thieberger, Nicholas (November 2001). State of Indigenous languages in Australia 2001 (PDF). Department of the Environment and Heritage. Archived (PDF) from the original on 26 December 2019.
- McConvell, Patrick; Evans, Nicholas, eds. (1997). Archaeology and linguistics: aboriginal Australia in global perspective. Oxford University Press Australia. ISBN 978-0-195-53728-4. Archived from the original on 22 December 2019.
- McConvell, Patrick & Claire Bowern. 2011. The prehistory and internal relationships of Australian languages. Language and Linguistics Compass 5(1). 19–32.
- Mitchell, Rod (April 2015), "Ngalmun Lagaw Yangukudu: The Language of our Homeland in Goemulgaw Lagal: Cultural and Natural Histories of the Island of Mabuyag, Torres Strait", Memoirs of the Queensland Museum – Culture, 8 (1): 323–446, ISSN 1440-4788
- O'Grady, Geoffrey; Hale, Ken (2004). "The Coherence and Distinctiveness of the Pama–Nyungan Language Family within the Australian Linguistic Phylum". In Bowern, Claire; Koch, Harold (eds.). Australian Languages: Classification and the comparative method. John Benjamins Publishing. pp. 69–92. ISBN 978-9-027-29511-8. Archived from the original on 25 December 2019.
- Pereltsvaig, Asya (2017). Languages of the World: An Introduction. Cambridge University Press. ISBN 978-1-107-17114-5. Archived from the original on 22 December 2019.
- Walsh, Michael (1991). "Overview of indigenous languages of Australia". In Romaine, Suzanne (ed.). Language in Australia. Cambridge University Press. pp. 27–48. ISBN 978-0-521-33983-4. Archived from the original on 24 December 2016.
- Wyles, Dwayne (2 June 2019). "Preserving Indigenous languages in IYIL2019 helps custodians heal, taps into knowledge of country". Australia: ABC News. Archived from the original on 3 June 2019.
- Zuckermann, Ghil'ad (26 August 2009). "Aboriginal languages deserve revival". The Australian. Archived from the original on 23 September 2009.
- Zuckermann, Ghil'ad; Walsh, Michael (2011). "Stop, Revive, Survive: Lessons from the Hebrew Revival Applicable to the Reclamation, Maintenance and Empowerment of Aboriginal Languages and Cultures" (PDF). Australian Journal of Linguistics. 31 (1): 111–127. doi:10.1080/07268602.2011.532859. S2CID 145627187. Archived (PDF) from the original on 28 September 2018.
- Harvey, Mark; Mailhammer, Robert (2024). Proto-Australian: Reconstruction of a Common Ancestor Language. De Gruyter. ISBN 9783111421445.
- Hale, Kenneth (1964). "Classification of Northern Paman Languages, Cape York Peninsula, Australia: A Research Report". Oceanic Linguistics. 3 (2): 248–265. doi:10.2307/3622881.
- Bowern, Claire (2017). "Language Isolates in Australia". In Campbell, Lyle (ed.). Language Isolates. Taylor & Francis Group. pp. 424–447. doi:10.4324/9781315750026-12. ISBN 9781317610915.
- Harvey, Mark; Mailhammer, Robert (30 January 2025). "New evidence confirms our Indigenous languages have a common source, but how they spread remains a mystery". The Conversation.
- "Languages alive". AIATSIS.
