= Gaagudju language =

Extinct indigenous language of Australia

Gaagudju
- Kakadu
- Native to: Australia
- Region: Northern Territory
- Ethnicity: Gaagudju, Watta
- Extinct: May 2002, with the death of Big Bill Neidjie
- Language family: Macro-Gunwinyguan? Arnhem Land?: Gaagudju
- Dialects: Wada

Language codes
- ISO 639-3: gbu
- Glottolog: gaga1251
- AIATSIS: N50
- ELP: Gagudju
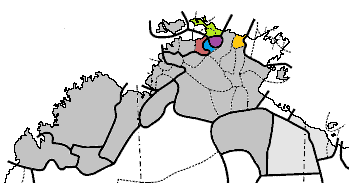
- Gaagudju

- Gaagudju is classified as Extinct by the UNESCO Atlas of the World's Languages in Danger.

Gaagudju (also spelt Gagadu, Gaguju, and Kakadu) is an extinct Australian Aboriginal language formerly spoken in the environs of Kakadu National Park, in Arnhem Land, Northern Territory, Australia.

== Country and status ==
Explorer Baldwin Spencer incorrectly ascribed the name "Kakadu tribe" to all of the people living in the Alligator Rivers area, but Gaagudju was confined to the plains South and East Alligator Rivers.

The language is classed as extinct, since its last fluent speaker, Big Bill Neidjie, died on 23 May 2002;

== Classification ==
Gaagudju has traditionally been classified with the Gunwinyguan languages. However, in 1997 Nicholas Evans proposed an Arnhem Land family that includes Gaagudju.

== Phonology ==
=== Vowels ===
	Front	Back
High	i iː	u uː
Mid	e eː	o oː
Low	a aː	

=== Consonants ===
	Peripheral		Laminal	Apical	
	Bilabial	Velar	Palatal	Alveolar	Retroflex
Stop	p	k	c	t	ʈ
Nasal	m	ŋ	ɲ	n	ɳ
Lateral			ʎ	l	𝼈
Rhotic				r	ɻ
Semivowel	w		j		

== Vocabulary ==
Capell (1942) lists the following basic vocabulary items:

gloss	Gagadu
man	djereiŋi
woman	djireːwan
head	ŋaːṙi
eye	bɔːrɔ
nose	geːni
mouth	djaːbul
tongue	ŋaːndjil
stomach	mabulu
bone	benaːgăra
blood	maneŋul
kangaroo	baːgu
opossum	mɔɳɔ
emu	gabaṙɛːbi
crow	mawaːga
fly	ŋɔrmul
sun	gobolbara
moon	maɖba
fire	gudjäli
smoke	uŋari
water	gaṙu
