= Margaret Heffernan (linguist) =

Australian Indigenous author and interpreter

- Born: 1944 (age 81–82)
- Spouse: Tommy Dixon

Academic background
- Education: Batchelor Institute of Indigenous Tertiary Education

Academic work
- Discipline: Linguist

Margaret Heffernan (born 1944), is a Central Arrernte linguist, author, interpreter and translator who is now a well respected elder in her community. Heffernan is responsible for developing the orthography of Arrernte.

== Early life ==
Heffernan was born at the sacred site of Werlatye Atherre, just north of the Alice Springs Telegraph Station, and is part of the Caterpillar Dreaming. She is part of the Water Dreaming as she was conceived at another sacred site, Apmere Yetwernte, near Aileron.

Growing up, Heffernan had been told her birthday was 1 April 1943, but this date was invented when she first came into contact with government institutions; later records show it having been recorded as 1944.

The Heffernan family travelled a lot around Central Australia in Margaret's early childhood for family and ceremony and also for work. Heffernan recalls that, in 1949, her family moved to work in the Jervois Range, far east and towards the Queensland border, where her father had gotten a job with Kurt Johannsen working on a copper mine which had been abandoned. The family stayed there for a year, until her now pregnant mother wanted to return to Alice Springs where she would have the support of family, and family midwives, for the birth. Shortly after this they then went to Yambah Station where, again, they stayed for about a year.

Finally, in 1951, Heffernan's family settled, for some time, in Alice Springs where they lived at Middle Camp (on Charles Creek) and it is here where she was forced to start attending school at the former Bungalow at the Alice Springs Telegraph Station, which was by then functioning as an Aboriginal Reserve. Heffernan recalls that: "The old people worried that this school business didn't fit well with our culture. It didn't allow time for ceremony and teaching old ways, But nobody asked them." She was allowed to go home at night.

In 1953 the family were "as good as pushed" into going to live at Santa Teresa (now the Ltyentye Apurte Community) and, once there, Heffernan was forced to live separately from her family in dormitory accommodation associated with the school and was only allowed to visit her family on weekends. Heffernan finished school in the late-1950s.

Following school, in Heffernan's early adulthood, she worked in the Amoonguna kitchens where she met her husband Tommy Dixon, an Anmatyerr man from Napperby Station. In the early years of their marriage, they travelled between Napperby Station and Santa Teresa.

== Career ==
Heffernan started working in linguistics after starting as a bilingual education teacher at Santa Teresa School which inspired her to study a Diploma of Linguistics at Batchelor Institute of Indigenous Tertiary Education. At Batchelor she collaborated with linguist Gavan Breen and, together, they developed the Arrernte orthography.

Following this, she went on the teach at the Institute for Aboriginal Development and Yipirinya School. Additionally, she has worked with Margaret James on the Central Arrernte language versions of the Honey Ant Readers.

In 2018, Heffernan published her autobiography, supported by Gerard Waterford and Francis Coughlan with the aim of helping young people maintain their traditions to keep Arrernte families and language strong; the book is: Gathering Sticks: lighting up small fires, and was published by IAD Press. It was her desire, in telling this story, was to pass on to her children and future generations of her family, her life story. In his review of this book artist Rod Moss says that her voice, in this book, is "[f]irm but free of the bitterness which readers might feel warranted, her voice never pulls punches".

== Personal life ==
As of 2019, she lives at Hidden Valley, a town camp of Alice Springs, with her daughters.

Heffernan has a Catholic faith but has also stated the church needs to do more for the Aboriginal community.
