= Catherine Berndt =

Australian anthropologist (1918–1994)

Catherine Helen Berndt AM
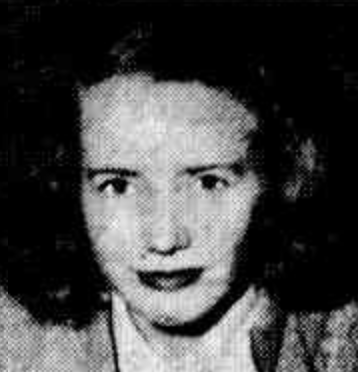
- Catherine Berndt, c. 1952
- Born: Catherine Helen Webb; 8 May 1918; Auckland, New Zealand
- Died: 12 May 1994 (aged 76); Perth, Australia
- Occupation: Anthropologist
- Spouse: Ronald Berndt (m. 1941–1990)

Catherine Helen Berndt AM, née Webb (8 May 1918 – 12 May 1994) was a New Zealand-born Australian anthropologist known for her research in Australia and Papua New Guinea conducted jointly with her husband, Ronald Berndt.

== Early life and education ==
Catherine Helen Webb was born on 8 May 1918 in Auckland, New Zealand, in her great aunt's house, in which her mother had grown up. Her mother and aunt had moved to New Zealand from Nova Scotia, of Scottish ancestry. Her parents separated and her father moved to Australia.

== Career ==
Berndt published valuable monographs on Aboriginal Australians, including Women's Changing ceremonies in Northern Australia (1950). She authored over 36 major publications about women's social and religious life in Australia, New Zealand, and Papua New Guinea, plus a dozen co-authored publications with others. One of Berndt’s best known collaborators from the aboriginal communities was the Maung woman Mondalmi, who worked with her.

== Recognition and awards ==
For her work, Berndt was elected an Honorary Fellow of the Royal Anthropological Institute in London. She was also the 7th woman elected as a Fellow in the Academy of the Social Sciences in Australia.

She was awarded in 1950 the Percy Smith Medal from the University of Otago, New Zealand and the Edgeworth David Medal from the Royal Society of New South Wales, the latter jointly with Ronald Berndt. In 1980 she received a children's book award and medal for her book, Land of the Rainbow Snake, a collection of stories from Western Arnhem Land.

Berndt was appointed a Member of the Order of Australia in the 1987 Australia Day Honours for her "service to anthropology, particularly in relation to the Aboriginal society and culture".

== Death and legacy ==
She died in 1994.

With her husband Ronald Berndt, C. Berndt collected Indigenous art works of Australia and Asia. The collection is conserved in the Berndt Museum of Anthropology, founded by the couple in 1976 at the University of Western Australia.

== Selected works ==
- The Aboriginal Australians: The first pioneers. Pitman. OCLC 830566543. (co-author)
- Arnhem Land: Its history and its people (co-author)
- "Monsoon and Honey Wind". 1970. (about the Wawalag myth)
