= Voiced retroflex lateral flap =

Consonantal sound represented by ⟨𝼈⟩ in IPA

𝼈

ɭ̆

Audio sample
- source · help

Encoding
- Entity (decimal): &#122632;
- Unicode (hex): U+1DF08
Image

A voiced retroflex lateral flap is a type of consonantal sound, used in some spoken languages. The "implicit" symbol in the International Phonetic Alphabet is ⟨𝼈 ⟩. The sound may also be transcribed as a short ⟨ɭ̆ ⟩, or with the retired IPA dot diacritic, ⟨ɺ̣⟩.

== Features ==
Features of a voiced retroflex lateral flap:

- Its manner of articulation is tap or flap, which means it is produced with a single contraction of the muscles so that one articulator (usually the tongue) is thrown against another.
- Its place of articulation is retroflex, which prototypically means it is articulated subapical (with the tip of the tongue curled up), but more generally, it means that it is postalveolar without being palatalized. That is, besides the prototypical subapical articulation, the tongue can be apical (pointed) or, in some fricatives, laminal (flat).
- Its phonation is voiced, which means the vocal cords vibrate during the articulation.
- It is an oral consonant, which means that air is not allowed to escape through the nose.
- It is a lateral consonant, which means it is produced by directing the airstream over the sides of the tongue, rather than down the middle.
- Its airstream mechanism is pulmonic, which means it is articulated by pushing air only with the intercostal muscles and abdominal muscles, as in most speech sounds.

== Occurrence ==
Language		Word	IPA	Meaning	Notes
Amis		ꞌuꞌul	[ʡuʡuɺ̠ᵊ]	'fog'	Apical postalveolar with schwa release.
Ilgar					Contrasts /l, ɺ, ɭ, 𝼈 / and possibly /ʎ, ʎ̆/, though the last are likely underlying sequences of /lj, ɺj/.
Iwaidja		[ŋa𝼈uli]		'my foot'	Contrasts /l, ɺ, ɭ, 𝼈 / and possibly /ʎ, ʎ̆/, though the last are likely underlying sequences of /lj, ɺj/.
Kannada		ಕೇಳಿ/Kēḷi	[keː𝼈i]	'to ask'	Can be an approximant [ɭ ] instead.
Kobon		ƚawƚ	[𝼈aw𝼈 ]	'to shoot'	Subapical.
Konkani		फळ/fāḷ	[fə𝼈 ]	'fruit'	
Kresh			—	—	
Malayalam		വേളി/vēḷi	[veː𝼈i]	'marriage'	Can be an approximant [ɭ ] instead.
Marathi		केळी/Kēḷī	[ke𝼈iː]	'bananas'	See Marathi phonology
Tarama & Irabu		—	[paɨ𝼈 ]	'to pull'	
Norwegian	Trøndersk	glas	[ˈɡɺ̠ɑːs]	'glass'	Apical postalveolar; also described as central [ɽ]. See Norwegian phonology
O'odham			—	—	Apical postalveolar.
Pashto		ړوند/llund	[𝼈und]	'blind'	Contrasts plain and nasalized flaps. Tend to be lateral at the beginning of a prosodic unit, and a central flap [ɽ] or approximant [ɻ ] elsewhere.
Sanskrit	Vedic	गूळ्ह	[ɡuː.ɭ̆ʱɐ́]	'hidden'	Represented by a ⟨ळ⟩. Pronounced as /ɭɐ/.This consonant was present in Vedic Sanskrit but had become /ɖ/ ⟨ड⟩ in classical Sanskrit. See Vedic Sanskrit and Sanskrit phonology.
Swedish		blad	['b𝼈ɑː(d)]	'leaf'	Allophone of /l/ and /rd/. More commonly transcribed as [ɽ].
Tamil		குளி/Kuḷi	[ˈku𝼈i]	'bathe'	Allophone of /ɭ /. See Tamil phonology
Telugu		పెళ్ళి/Pelli	[ˈpe𝼈i]	'Marriage'	Allophone of /ɭ /. See Telugu phonology
Tarahumara	Western Rarámuri		—	—	Often transcribed /𝼈 /.
Totoli		—	[u𝼈aɡ]	'snake'	Allophone of /ɺ/ after back vowels.
Tukang Besi			—	—	Possible allophone of /l/ after back vowels, as well as an allophone of /r/.
Waiwai		kir̂wan̂he	[ki𝼈̻waɲhe]	'good'	Laminal postalveolar.
Wayuu		laülaa	[𝼈áɨ𝼈aa]	'old man'	postalveolar?
Zaghawa	Chadian dialects	Beri	[be𝼈i]	'Zaghawa'	

A retroflex lateral flap has been reported from various languages of Sulawesi such as the Sangiric languages, Buol and Totoli, as well as Nambikwara in Brazil (plain and laryngealized), Gaagudju in Australia, Purépecha and Western Rarámuri in Mexico, Moro in Sudan, O'odham and Mohawk in the United States, Chaga in Tanzania, and Kanuri in Nigeria.

Various Dravidian and Indo-Aryan languages of Indian subcontinent are reported to have a retroflex lateral flap, either phonemically or phonetically, including Gujarati, Konkani, Marathi, Odia, and Rajasthani. Masica describes the sound as widespread in the Indic languages of India:

A retroflex flapped lateral /ḷ/, contrasting with ordinary /l/, is a prominent feature of Odia, Marathi–Konkani, Gujarati, most varieties of Rajasthani and Bhili, Punjabi, some dialects of "Lahnda", ... most dialects of West Pahari, and Kumauni (not in the Southeastern dialect described by Apte and Pattanayak), as well as Hariyanvi and the Saharanpur subdialect of Northwestern Kauravi ("Vernacular Hindustani") investigated by Gumperz. It is absent from most other NIA languages, including most Hindi dialects, Nepali, Garhwali, Bengali, Assamese, Kashmiri and other Dardic languages (except for the Dras dialect of Shina and possibly Khowar), the westernmost West Pahari dialects bordering Dardic (Bhalesi, Khashali, Rudhari, Padari) as well as the easternmost (Jaunsari, Sirmauri), and from Sindhi, Kacchi, and Siraiki. It was once present in Sinhalese, but in the modern language has merged with /l/.

Place →	Labial					Coronal										Dorsal					Laryngeal			
Manner ↓	Bilabial		Labiodental		Linguolabial		Dental		Alveolar		Postalveolar		Retroflex		(Alveolo-)palatal		Velar		Uvular		Pharyngeal/epiglottal		Glottal	
Nasal	m̥	m	ɱ̊	ɱ		n̼	n̪̊	n̪	n̥	n	n̠̊	n̠	ɳ̊	ɳ	ɲ̊	ɲ	ŋ̊	ŋ	ɴ̥	ɴ				
Plosive	p	b	p̪	b̪	t̼	d̼	t̪	d̪	t	d			ʈ	ɖ	c	ɟ	k	ɡ	q	ɢ	ʡ		ʔ	
Sibilant affricate							ts̪	dz̪	ts	dz	tʃ	dʒ	tʂ	dʐ	tɕ	dʑ								
Non-sibilant affricate	pɸ	bβ	p̪f	b̪v			tθ	dð	tɹ̝̊	dɹ̝	t̠ɹ̝̊	d̠ɹ̝			cç	ɟʝ	kx	ɡɣ	qχ	ɢʁ	ʡʜ	ʡʢ	ʔh	
Sibilant fricative							s̪	z̪	s	z	ʃ	ʒ	ʂ	ʐ	ɕ	ʑ								
Non-sibilant fricative	ɸ	β	f	v	θ̼	ð̼	θ	ð	θ̠	ð̠	ɹ̝̠̊	ɹ̠᷵	ɻ̥᷵	ɻ᷵	ç	ʝ	x	ɣ	χ	ʁ	ħ	ʕ	h	ɦ
Approximant		β̞		ʋ				ð̞		ɹ		ɹ̠		ɻ		j		ɰ						˷
Tap/flap		ⱱ̟		ⱱ					ɾ̥	ɾ			ɽ̊	ɽ						ɢ̆		ʡ̆		
Trill	ʙ̥	ʙ							r̥	r		r̠	ɽ̊r̥	ɽr					ʀ̥	ʀ	ʜ	ʢ		
Lateral affricate									tɬ	dɮ			tꞎ	d𝼅	c𝼆	ɟʎ̝	k𝼄	ɡʟ̝						
Lateral fricative							ɬ̪		ɬ	ɮ			ꞎ	𝼅	𝼆	ʎ̝	𝼄	ʟ̝						
Lateral approximant								l̪	l̥	l		l̠	ɭ̊	ɭ	ʎ̥	ʎ	ʟ̥	ʟ		ʟ̠				
Lateral tap/flap									ɺ̥	ɺ			𝼈̊	𝼈		ʎ̆		ʟ̆						

		BL	LD	D	A	PA	RF	P	V	U
Implosive	Voiced	ɓ			ɗ		ᶑ	ʄ	ɠ	ʛ
Implosive	Voiceless	ɓ̥			ɗ̥		ᶑ̊	ʄ̊	ɠ̊	ʛ̥
Ejective	Stop	pʼ			tʼ		ʈʼ	cʼ	kʼ	qʼ
Ejective	Affricate		p̪fʼ	tθʼ	tsʼ	tʃʼ	tʂʼ	tɕʼ	kxʼ	qχʼ
Ejective	Fricative	ɸʼ	fʼ	θʼ	sʼ	ʃʼ	ʂʼ	ɕʼ	xʼ	χʼ
Ejective	Lateral affricate				tɬʼ			c𝼆ʼ	k𝼄ʼ	q𝼄ʼ
Ejective	Lateral fricative				ɬʼ					
Click (top: velar; bottom: uvular)	Tenuis	kʘ qʘ		kǀ qǀ	kǃ qǃ		k𝼊 q𝼊	kǂ qǂ		
Click (top: velar; bottom: uvular)	Voiced	ɡʘ ɢʘ		ɡǀ ɢǀ	ɡǃ ɢǃ		ɡ𝼊 ɢ𝼊	ɡǂ ɢǂ		
Click (top: velar; bottom: uvular)	Nasal	ŋʘ ɴʘ		ŋǀ ɴǀ	ŋǃ ɴǃ		ŋ𝼊 ɴ𝼊	ŋǂ ɴǂ	ʞ	
Click (top: velar; bottom: uvular)	Tenuis lateral				kǁ qǁ					
Click (top: velar; bottom: uvular)	Voiced lateral				ɡǁ ɢǁ					
Click (top: velar; bottom: uvular)	Nasal lateral				ŋǁ ɴǁ					
