= Goulburn Islands =

Group of islands off the Northern Australian coast

Coordinates: 11°38′S 133°22′E

The Goulburn Islands are a group of small islands and islets in the Arafura Sea off the coast of Arnhem Land in Northern Territory of Australia. The largest islands are Weyirra (North Goulburn Island) and Warruwi (South Goulburn Island), where the climate is slightly cooler than in Darwin. The Warruwi or Maung people are the traditional owners of the Goulburn Islands.

The majority of the population reside on South Goulburn Island, in the community of Warruwi and surrounding outstations, where the population was 389 in the 2016 census. The islands are notable for the large number of Indigenous Australian languages spoken there. In particular, the Warruwi community on South Goulburn Island - where at least nine different languages are spoken within a population of only 450 people - has been noted as an example of receptive multilingualism.

Mondalmi is one of the most well-known women from the area, as she worked with anthropologist Catherine Berndt to enable study of Aboriginal cultures there.

The islands and their Indigenous inhabitants were featured in the 2015 David Grubin directed PBS documentary Language Matters with Bob Holman, written and narrated by Bob Holman, which focused on the loss, due to globalisation, of many of the planets' languages, such as those spoken on the Goulburn Islands.
