= Maung language =

Language spoken by the Warruwi people of Northern Territory

Maung
- Gun-Marung
- Native to: Australia
- Region: Goulburn Island, Arnhem Land
- Ethnicity: Maung people
- Native speakers: 360 (2021 census)
- Language family: Iwaidjan: Iwaidjic; Maung
- Dialects: ?Manangkardi †

Language codes
- ISO 639-3: mph
- Glottolog: maun1240
- AIATSIS: N64
- ELP: Mawng
- Maung is classified as Vulnerable by the UNESCO Atlas of the World's Languages in Danger.

Maung (Mawung, Mawng, Gun-marung) is an Australian Aboriginal language spoken by the Maung people on the Goulburn Islands, off the north coast of Arnhem Land, in the Northern Territory of Australia. Maung is closely related to Iwaidja, which occupies the northwestern corner of the opposite mainland. Mawng belongs to the Iwaidjan language family of non-Pama–Nyungan languages. As of the 2021 census, there were around 360 speakers of the language.

Study of Maung has developed to the point where a dictionary, grammar and portions of the Bible are available. Maung is taught in local schools alongside English and other languages such as Iwaidja or Kunwinjku. Children are still acquiring it as a first language, making it somewhat healthier than most other Aboriginal languages.

== Alternative names ==
- Kunmarung (Kunwinjku exonym)

== History ==
=== Language contact ===
Mawng has been influenced by Bininj Kunwok, the territory of which borders that of Mawng, as well as Makassarese due to cooperation between the Mawng and Makassar people, who came to the area of Mawng to collect sea slugs.

== Geographical distribution ==
Mawng is the primary language spoken at Warruwi, originally established as a Methodist mission in 1916, which is located in their lands; the Mawng also worked the closest with missionaries.

== Phonology ==
Consonant inventory
	Peripheral		Laminal	Apical	
	Bilabial	Velar	Postalveolar	Alveolar	Retroflex
Plosives	p	k	tʲ	t	ʈ
Nasals	m	ŋ	nʲ	n	ɳ
Laterals				l	ɭ
Flaps				ɾ	ɽ
Approximants	w	ɣ	j	ɹ	

Vowel inventory
	Front	Central	Back
High	i		u
Mid	ɛ		ɔ
Low		a	

The phonemic inventories provided here are from Capell's well-known 1970 work on Maung. More recent papers (Singer 2006; Teo 2007) have only two rhotics to Capell's three. Teo lacks the alveolar flap, and Singer the retroflex flap. (In a minor difference, both describe the approximant as retroflex, whereas Capell describes it as alveolar.)

== Morphology ==
=== Gender ===
Maung has five grammatical genders: masculine, feminine, vegetation, land, and edible.
