= Iwaidja language =

Iwaidjan language spoken in Australia

Iwaidja
- Native to: Australia
- Region: Croker Island, Northern Territory
- Ethnicity: Iwaidja people
- Native speakers: 154 (2021 census)
- Language family: Iwaidjan: Iwaidjic; Warrkbi; Iwaidja
- Writing system: Latin script

Language codes
- ISO 639-3: ibd
- Glottolog: iwai1244
- AIATSIS: N39
- ELP: Iwaidja

Iwaidja, in phonemic spelling Iwaja, is an Australian Aboriginal language of the Iwaidja people with about 150 native, and an extra 20 to 30 L2 speakers in northernmost Australia. Historically having come from the base of the Cobourg Peninsula, it is now spoken on Croker Island. It is still being learnt by children within the Northern Territory. Speakers are switching to English or Kuninjku.

== Phonology ==
=== Consonants ===
Iwaidja has the following 20 consonants. Some of the precise articulatory categories for the consonants are uncertain; the chart below follows Shaw et al (2020)'s conventions. Symbols in angle brackets ‹› are the orthographic representations for these sounds.

	Peripheral		Laminal	Apical	
	Bilabial	Velar	Palatal	Alveolar	Retroflex
Nasal	m ‹m›	ŋ ‹ng›	ɲ ‹ny›	n ‹n›	ɳ ‹rn›
Plosive (Note: The plosives are allophonically voiced, and are often written b d ɖ ɟ ɡ.)	p ‹b›	k ‹k›	c ‹j›	t ‹d›	ʈ ‹rt›
Approximant	w ‹w›	ɰ ‹h› (Note: This sound is sometimes classified as a fricative, but recent phonetic analysis suggests it is more akin to an approximant.)	j ‹y›		ɻ ‹r›
Tap				ɾ ‹rr›	ɽ ‹rd›
Lateral				l ‹l›	ɭ ‹rl›
Lateral flap				ɺ ‹ld›	𝼈 ‹rld›

=== Vowels ===
Iwaidja has three vowels, /a, i, u/. The following table shows the allophones of these vowels as described by Pym and Larrimore.

Vowel	Allophone	Environment
/i/	[iː]	Occurs before laminal consonants.
/i/	[e]	Occurs word initially.
/i/	[i]	All other cases.
/a/	[ai]	Occurs before laminal consonants.
/a/	[æ]	Occurs following laminal consonants except utterance final. Free variation with [a] in this environment.
/a/	[au]	Occurs before /w/. Free variation with [a] in this environment.
/a/	[a]	All other cases.
/u/	[ui]	Occurs before laminal consonants.
/u/	[o]	Occurs following velar consonant. Free variation with [u] in this environment.
/u/	[u]	All other cases.

== Morphophonemics ==
Iwaidja has extensive morphophonemic alternation. For example, body parts occur with possessive prefixes, and these alter the first consonant in the root:

ŋa-ɺ̡uli	aŋ-kuli	ɹuli
my foot	your foot	his/her foot

Both the words arm and to be sick originally started with an /m/, as shown in related languages such as Maung. The pronominal prefix for it, its altered the first consonant of the root. In Iwaidja, this form extended to the masculine and feminine, so that gender distinctions were lost, and the prefix disappeared, leaving only the consonant mutation—a situation perhaps unique in Australia, but not unlike that of the Celtic languages.

	arm	to be sick
they	a-mawur their arms	a-macu they're sick
he/she/it	pawur his/her arm	pacu s/he's sick

== Semantics ==
The Iwaidja languages are nearly unique among the languages of the world in using verbs for kin terms. Nouns are used for direct address, but transitive verbs in all other cases. In English something similar is done in special cases: he fathered a child; she mothers him too much. But these do not indicate social relationships in English. For example, he fathered a child says nothing about whether he is the man the child calls "father". An Iwaidja speaker, on the other hand, says I nephew her to mean "she is my aunt". Because these are verbs, they can be inflected for tense. In the case of in-laws, this is equivalent to my ex-wife or the bride-to-be in English. However, with blood relations, past can only mean that the person has died, and future only that they are yet to be born.

a -pana -maɽjarwu -n
I-to-him FUT {am father to} NOUN
"my future son" (lit. "I will be his father")

ɹi -maka -ntuŋ
he-to-her {is husband to} PAST
"his ex/late wife" (lit. "he was husband to her")

== Alternative names ==
- Yibadjdja (Kunwinjku exonym)
