= Voiced alveolar lateral flap =

Consonantal sounds represented by ⟨ɺ⟩ in IPA

ɺ
- IPA number: 181

Audio sample
- source · help

Encoding
- Entity (decimal): &#634;
- Unicode (hex): U+027A
- X-SAMPA: l\
- Braille: ⠦ (braille pattern dots-236) ⠼ (braille pattern dots-3456)
Image

Voiced postalveolar lateral flap

ɺ̠

Audio sample
- source · help

A voiced alveolar lateral flap is a type of consonantal sound, found in some spoken languages. The symbol in the International Phonetic Alphabet that represents this sound is ⟨ɺ⟩, a fusion of a rotated lowercase letter ⟨r⟩ with a letter ⟨l⟩. Approved in 1928, the symbol represented a sound intermediate between [d] and [l] or between [r] and [l] until 1979, when its value was redefined as an alveolar lateral flap.

Some languages that are described as having a lateral flap actually have a flap that is indeterminate with respect to centrality, and may surface as either central or lateral, either in free variation or allophonically depending on surrounding vowels and consonants.

Additionally, some languages have a voiced postalveolar lateral flap, which can be transcribed in the IPA with the retracted diacritic, such as ⟨ɺ̠⟩.

== Features ==
Features of a voiced alveolar lateral flap:

- Its manner of articulation is tap or flap, which means it is produced with a single contraction of the muscles so that one articulator (usually the tongue) is thrown against another.
- Its place of articulation is alveolar, which means it is articulated with either the tip or the blade of the tongue at the alveolar ridge, termed respectively apical and laminal.
- Its phonation is voiced, which means the vocal cords vibrate during the articulation.
- It is an oral consonant, which means that air is not allowed to escape through the nose.
- It is a lateral consonant, which means it is produced by directing the airstream over the sides of the tongue, rather than down the middle.
- Its airstream mechanism is pulmonic, which means it is articulated by pushing air only with the intercostal muscles and abdominal muscles, as in most speech sounds.

== Occurrence ==
=== Alveolar ===
Language	Word	IPA	Meaning	Notes
Baniwa	riwadzore	[ɺiwa'd͡zoɺe]	'ember'	Varies a median flap, but is lateral in careful pronunciation.
Chaga (Vunjo dialect)	iraa	[iɺaa]	'to dress oneself'	Contrasts with /l̪/
Iwaidja	ayanjildin	[ajanɟiɺin]	'sweetheart'	Contrasts /l, ɺ, ɭ , ɭ̆ / and possibly /ʎ, ʎ̮/.
Japanese	六 roku	[ɺo̞kɯ̟ᵝ]	'six'	Allophonically [ɾ]. See Japanese phonology
Japanese	心 kokoro	[ko̞ko̞ɺo̞]	'heart'	Allophonically [ɾ]. See Japanese phonology
Kasua	hilila	[hiɺiɺɑ]	'heavy'	Never used at the beginning nor the end of a word.
Wayuu	püülükü	[pɨːɺɨkɨ]	'pig'	Contrasts with /r/.
Yalë	Yalë	[jaɺɛ]	'Yalë'	In free variation with [d]; written as ⟨d⟩ or ⟨l⟩.

=== Postalveolar ===
Language		Word	IPA	Meaning	Notes
Amis		ꞌuꞌul	[ʡuʡuɺ̠ᵊ]	'fog'	Has a vowel-like release when word final.
Norwegian	Trøndersk	glas	[ˈɡɺ̠ɑːs]	'glass'	Also described as central [ɽ]. See Norwegian phonology

== See also ==
- Index of phonetics articles
- Perception of English /r/ and /l/ by Japanese speakers

== Notes ==
Place →	Labial					Coronal										Dorsal					Laryngeal			
Manner ↓	Bilabial		Labiodental		Linguolabial		Dental		Alveolar		Postalveolar		Retroflex		(Alveolo-)palatal		Velar		Uvular		Pharyngeal/epiglottal		Glottal	
Nasal	m̥	m	ɱ̊	ɱ		n̼	n̪̊	n̪	n̥	n	n̠̊	n̠	ɳ̊	ɳ	ɲ̊	ɲ	ŋ̊	ŋ	ɴ̥	ɴ				
Plosive	p	b	p̪	b̪	t̼	d̼	t̪	d̪	t	d			ʈ	ɖ	c	ɟ	k	ɡ	q	ɢ	ʡ		ʔ	
Sibilant affricate							t̪s̪	d̪z̪	ts	dz	t̠ʃ	d̠ʒ	tʂ	dʐ	tɕ	dʑ								
Non-sibilant affricate	pɸ	bβ	p̪f	b̪v			t̪θ	d̪ð	tɹ̝̊	dɹ̝	t̠ɹ̠̊˔	d̠ɹ̠˔			cç	ɟʝ	kx	ɡɣ	qχ	ɢʁ	ʡʜ	ʡʢ	ʔh	
Sibilant fricative							s̪	z̪	s	z	ʃ	ʒ	ʂ	ʐ	ɕ	ʑ								
Non-sibilant fricative	ɸ	β	f	v	θ̼	ð̼	θ	ð	θ̠	ð̠	ɹ̠̊˔	ɹ̠˔	ɻ̊˔	ɻ˔	ç	ʝ	x	ɣ	χ	ʁ	ħ	ʕ	h	ɦ
Approximant		β̞		ʋ				ð̞		ɹ		ɹ̠		ɻ		j		ɰ						˷
Tap/flap		ⱱ̟		ⱱ					ɾ̥	ɾ			ɽ̊	ɽ						ɢ̆		ʡ̆		
Trill	ʙ̥	ʙ							r̥	r		r̠	ɽ̊r̥	ɽr					ʀ̥	ʀ	ʜ	ʢ		
Lateral affricate									tɬ	dɮ			tꞎ	d𝼅	c𝼆	ɟʎ̝	k𝼄	ɡʟ̝						
Lateral fricative							ɬ̪		ɬ	ɮ			ꞎ	𝼅	𝼆	ʎ̝	𝼄	ʟ̝						
Lateral approximant								l̪	l̥	l		l̠	ɭ̊	ɭ	ʎ̥	ʎ	ʟ̥	ʟ		ʟ̠				
Lateral tap/flap									ɺ̥	ɺ			𝼈̊	𝼈		ʎ̆		ʟ̆						

		BL	LD	D	A	PA	RF	P	V	U
Implosive	Voiced	ɓ			ɗ		ᶑ	ʄ	ɠ	ʛ
Implosive	Voiceless	ɓ̥			ɗ̥		ᶑ̊	ʄ̊	ɠ̊	ʛ̥
Ejective	Stop	pʼ			tʼ		ʈʼ	cʼ	kʼ	qʼ
Ejective	Affricate		p̪fʼ	tθʼ	tsʼ	tʃʼ	tʂʼ	tɕʼ	kxʼ	qχʼ
Ejective	Fricative	ɸʼ	fʼ	θʼ	sʼ	ʃʼ	ʂʼ	ɕʼ	xʼ	χʼ
Ejective	Lateral affricate				tɬʼ			c𝼆ʼ	k𝼄ʼ	q𝼄ʼ
Ejective	Lateral fricative				ɬʼ					
Click (top: velar; bottom: uvular)	Tenuis	kʘ qʘ		kǀ qǀ	kǃ qǃ		k𝼊 q𝼊	kǂ qǂ		
Click (top: velar; bottom: uvular)	Voiced	ɡʘ ɢʘ		ɡǀ ɢǀ	ɡǃ ɢǃ		ɡ𝼊 ɢ𝼊	ɡǂ ɢǂ		
Click (top: velar; bottom: uvular)	Nasal	ŋʘ ɴʘ		ŋǀ ɴǀ	ŋǃ ɴǃ		ŋ𝼊 ɴ𝼊	ŋǂ ɴǂ	ʞ	
Click (top: velar; bottom: uvular)	Tenuis lateral				kǁ qǁ					
Click (top: velar; bottom: uvular)	Voiced lateral				ɡǁ ɢǁ					
Click (top: velar; bottom: uvular)	Nasal lateral				ŋǁ ɴǁ					
