= Nicholas Evans (linguist) =

Australian linguist (born 1956)

- Born: 1956 (age 69–70); Los Angeles, United States
- Occupation: Linguist
- Awards: Australian Laureate Fellowship (2013)

Academic background
- Education: Australian National University

Academic work
- Institutions: Australian National University
- Main interests: Australian languages, Papuan languages, linguistic typology

Nicholas Evans (born 1956) is an Australian linguist and a leading expert on endangered languages. He was born in Los Angeles.

Holding a Ph.D. in Linguistics from the Australian National University (ANU), he is Head of the Department of Linguistics and Distinguished Professor in the School of Culture, History and Language at the College of Asia and the Pacific at ANU. Formerly, he held a personal chair in the Department of Linguistics and Applied Linguistics at the University of Melbourne.

His research interests include Aboriginal Australian languages, Papuan languages, linguistic typology, historical and contact linguistics, semantics, and the mutual influence of language and culture. He worked at the Dublin Institute for Advanced Studies in 2003 for the school of Celtic Studies. Recent focuses include the way in which diverse grammars underpin social cognition (with Alan Rumsey and others); ongoing fieldwork on various Aboriginal languages of Northern Australia (Dalabon, Iwaidja, Marrku, Bininj Kunwok, Kayardild); Papuan languages (Nen, Idi), work on endangered song-language traditions of Western Arnhem Land (with Allan Marett, Linda Barwick and Murray Garde), and the development of coevolutionary approaches that integrate the dynamic interactions between language, culture and cognition. In addition to his linguistic research he has carried out more applied work in Australian Aboriginal communities in various capacities, including interpreting and preparing anthropologists' reports in Native Title claims, and writing about the new art being produced by artists from Bentinck Island.

Evans signed the Declaration on the Common Language of the Croats, Serbs, Bosniaks and Montenegrins in 2019.

== Awards and honours ==
Evans was elected a Fellow of the Australian Academy of the Humanities in 1996.

In 2013, he was awarded an Australian Laureate Fellowship.

In 2025, he was awarded the Neil and Saras Smith Medal for Linguistics by the British Academy.

== Selected works ==
- Evans, Nicholas (2011). Dying Words: Endangered Languages and What They Have to Tell Us, John Wiley & Sons. ISBN 978-1-444-35961-9.
- Evans, Nicholas & Stephen C. Levinson (2009) "The myth of language universals: Language diversity and its importance for cognitive science". Behavioral and Brain Sciences 32(5).
- Evans, Nicholas; Martin-Chew, Louise; Memmott, Paul; Woomera Aboriginal Corporation. Mornington Island Arts & Craft (2008), The heart of everything: the art and artists of Mornington & Bentinck Islands, McCulloch & McCulloch Australian Art Books, ISBN 978-0-9804494-1-9
- Evans, Nicholas (2005). "Australian Languages Reconsidered: A Review of Dixon (2002)". Oceanic Linguistics 44 (1), pp. 242–286.
- Evans, Nicholas (ed.) (2003). The non-Pama-Nyungan languages of northern Australia: comparative studies of the continent's most linguistically complex region. Canberra: Pacific Linguistics. pp. x + 513.
- Evans, Nicholas (2003). Bininj Gun-wok: a pan-dialectal grammar of Mayali, Kunwinjku and Kune. (2 volumes). Canberra: Pacific Linguistics.
- Evans, Nicholas & Hans-Jürgen Sasse (eds) (2002). Problems of Polysynthesis. Berlin: Akademie Verlag. Studia Typologica, Neue Reihe.
- Evans, Nicholas (1998). "Aborigines Speak a Primitive Language". In: Bauer, Laurie; Trudgill, Peter. Language Myths, Penguin Books, pp. 159–168. ISBN 978-0-141-93910-0.
- McConvell, Patrick; Evans, Nicholas, eds. (1997). Archaeology and Linguistics: Aboriginal Australia in Global Perspective. Melbourne: Oxford University Press Australia. ISBN 0-19-553728-9.
- Evans, Nicholas (1995). A Grammar of Kayardild. Berlin: Mouton de Gruyter. ISBN 9783110127959.
