= Tap and flap consonants =

Consonants produced with a single muscle contraction

In phonetics, a flap or tap is a type of consonantal sound, which is produced with a single contraction of the muscles so that one articulator (such as the tongue) is thrown against another.

== Contrast with stops and trills ==
The main difference between a tap or flap and a stop is that in a tap/flap there is no buildup of air pressure behind the place of articulation and consequently no release burst. Otherwise a tap/flap is similar to a brief stop.

Taps and flaps also contrast with trills, where the airstream causes the articulator to vibrate. Trills may be realized as a single contact, like a tap or flap, but are variable, whereas a tap/flap is limited to a single contact. When a trill is brief and made with a single contact it is sometimes erroneously described as an (allophonic) tap/flap, but a true tap or flap is an active articulation whereas a trill is a passive articulation. That is, for a tap or flap the tongue makes an active gesture to contact the target place of articulation, whereas with a trill the contact is due to the vibration caused by the airstream rather than any active movement.

== Tap vs. flap ==
Many linguists use the terms tap and flap interchangeably. Peter Ladefoged proposed for a while that it might be useful to distinguish between them. He said that a tap strikes its point of contact directly (as a very brief stop) but a flap strikes the point of contact tangentially (since the flap passes by along its trajectory). However, his usage was inconsistent and contradicted itself in his other books, even between different editions of the same text.

Siniša Spajić, Peter Ladefoged, and P. Bhaskararao, in their paper The Trills of Toda, proposed a similar version of the distinction, with an extra description for flaps: "Flaps are most typically made by retracting the tongue tip behind the alveolar ridge and moving it forward so that it strikes the ridge in passing." Later in the paper, however, the term flap is used in all cases. Subsequent work on the labiodental flap has clarified the issue: flaps involve retraction of the active articulator, and a forward-striking movement.

For linguists who do not make the tap vs. flap distinction, alveolars are typically called taps, and other articulations are called flaps.

A few languages have been reported to contrast a tap and a flap (as in the proposed definition cited above) at the same place of articulation. This is the case for Norwegian, in which the alveolar apical tap /ɾ/ and the post-alveolar/retroflex apical flap /ɽ/ have the same place of articulation for some speakers, and Southeastern Katë, which also has both an apical alveolar tap ('upward' r) and an apical alveolar flap ('forward' ṛ).

== IPA symbols ==
The tap and flap consonants identified by the International Phonetic Alphabet are:

IPA	Description	Example			
IPA	Description	Language	Orthography	IPA	Meaning
ɾ	alveolar tap	Spanish	pero	[peɾo]	"but"
ɺ	alveolar lateral flap	Venda	vula	[vuɺa]	"to open"
ɽ	retroflex flap	Warlpiri	rdupa	[ɽupa]	"windbreak"
𝼈	retroflex lateral flap	Kobon	ƚawƚ	[𝼈aw𝼈]	"to shoot"
ⱱ	labiodental flap	Karang	vbara	[ⱱara]	"animal"

The Kiel Convention of the IPA recommended that for other taps and flaps, a homorganic consonant, such as a stop or trill, should be used with a breve diacritic:

Tap or flaps: where no independent symbol for a tap is provided, the breve diacritic should be used, e.g. [ʀ̆] or [n̆].

However, the former could be mistaken for a short trill, and is more clearly transcribed ⟨ɢ̆⟩, whereas for a nasal tap the unambiguous transcription ⟨ɾ̃⟩ is generally used.

== Types of taps and flaps ==
Attested tap and flap consonants
	Bilabial		Labio- dental	Dental		Alveolar		Post- alveolar	Retroflex		Palatal	Velar	Uvular	Epi- glottal
Central oral	p̆	ⱱ̟	ⱱ	ɾ̪̊	ɾ̪	ɾ̥	ɾ	ɾ̠	ɽ̊	ɽ			ɢ̆	ʡ̮
Central nasal							ɾ̃			ɽ̃				
Central fricative						ɾ̞̊	ɾ̞							
Lateral oral						ɺ̥	ɺ	ɺ̠	𝼈̊	𝼈	ʎ̮	ʟ̆		

=== Alveolar taps and flaps ===
Spanish features a good illustration of an alveolar flap, contrasting it with a trill: pero /ˈpeɾo/ "but" vs. perro /ˈpero/ "dog". Among the Germanic languages, the tap allophone occurs in American and Australian English and in Northern Low Saxon. In American and Australian English it tends to be an allophone of intervocalic /t/ and /d/, leading to homophonous pairs such as "metal" / "medal" and "latter" / "ladder" – see tapping. In a number of Low Saxon dialects it occurs as an allophone of intervocalic /d/ or /t/; e.g. bäden /beeden/ → [ˈbeːɾn] 'to pray', 'to request', gah to Bedde! /gaa tou bede/ → [ˌɡɑːtoʊˈbeɾe] 'go to bed!', Water /vaater/ → [ˈvɑːɾɜ] 'water', Vadder /fater/ → [ˈfaɾɜ] 'father'. (In some dialects this has resulted in reanalysis and a shift to /r/; thus bären [ˈbeːrn], to Berre [toʊˈbere], Warer [ˈvɑːrɜ], Varrer [ˈfarɜ].) Occurrence varies; in some Low Saxon dialects it affects both /t/ and /d/, while in others it affects only /d/. Other languages with this are Portuguese, Korean, and Austronesian languages with /r/.

In Galician, Portuguese and Sardinian, a flap often appears instead of a former /l/. This is part of a wider phenomenon called rhotacism.

=== Retroflex flaps ===
Most Indic and Dravidian languages have retroflex flaps. In Hindi there are three, a simple retroflex flap as in [bəɽaː] big, a murmured retroflex flap as in [koɽʱiː] leper, and a retroflex nasal flap in the Hindicized pronunciation of Sanskrit [məɽ̃iː] gem. Some of these may be allophonic.

A retroflex flap is also common in Norwegian dialects and some Swedish dialects.

=== Lateral taps and flaps ===
Many of the languages of Africa, Asia, and the Pacific that do not distinguish /r/ from /l/ may have a lateral flap. However, it is also possible that many of these languages do not have a lateral–central contrast at all, so that even a consistently neutral articulation may be perceived as sometimes lateral [ɺ] or [l], sometimes central [ɾ]. This has been suggested to be the case for Japanese, for example.

The Iwaidja language of Australia has both alveolar and retroflex lateral flaps. These contrast with lateral approximants at the same positions, as well as a retroflex tap [ɽ], alveolar tap [ɾ], and retroflex approximant [ɻ]. However, the flapped, or tapped, laterals in Iwaidja are distinct from 'lateral flaps' as represented by the corresponding IPA symbols (see below). These phones consist of a flap component followed by a lateral component, whereas In Iwaidja the opposite is the case. For this reason, current IPA transcriptions of these sounds by linguists working on the language consist of an alveolar lateral followed by a superscript alveolar tap and a retroflex lateral followed by a superscript retroflex tap.

According to Ladefoged & Maddieson (1996), intervocalic occurrences of velar laterals [ʟ] in the Kanite and Melpa languages of New Guinea may be very brief, and as such may be called velar lateral taps.

An alveolar–labiolingual lateral 'double flap' [ɺɺ̼] or [ɺ¡᫥] has been reported to exist in Pirahã as a special speech-register allophone of /ɡ/, in which the tongue strikes the alveolar ridge and then strikes the lower lip; it is a phonetic cluster that has "two, non-contiguous, non-simultaneous points of articulation".

=== Non-coronal flaps ===
The only common non-coronal flap is the labiodental flap, found throughout central Africa in languages such as Margi. In 2005, the IPA adopted a right-hook v, ⟨ⱱ⟩:

Previously it had been transcribed with the use of the breve diacritic, [v̆], or other ad hoc symbols.

Other taps or flaps are much less common. They include an epiglottal tap; a bilabial flap in Banda, which may be an allophone of the labiodental flap; a velar lateral tap as an allophone in Kanite and Melpa; and a uvular tap as an allophone in several languages. These are often transcribed with the breve diacritic, as [w̆, ʟ̆, ɢ̆]. Note here that, like a velar trill, a central velar flap or tap is not possible because the tongue and soft palate cannot move together easily enough to produce a sound.

Voiced palatal tap

ɟ̆

If other flaps are found, the breve diacritic could be used to represent them, but would more properly be combined with the symbol for the corresponding voiced stop. A palatal tap or flap, which unlike a velar tap (see below) is believed to be articulatorily possible, could be represented this way (by [ɟ̆]).

Voiced velar tap

ɡ̆

Audio sample
- source · help

Though deemed impossible on the IPA chart, a velar tap has been reported to occur allophonically in the Southeastern dialect of the Katë language and in Dàgáárè as a realization of /ɡ/, though given that the closure is in the velar/palatal region, it might be analyzed as a palatal tap.

=== Nasal taps and flaps ===
Nasalized consonants include taps and flaps, although these are rarely phonemic. In conversational (rather than carefully enunciated) speech, American English often features a nasal flap when /n/ or /nt/ are in intervocalic position before an unstressed vowel; for example, "winner" and "winter" become homophones: ['wɪ^{(~)}ɾ̃ɚ]. Many West African languages have a nasal flap [ɾ̃] (or [n̆]) as an allophone of /ɾ/ before a nasal vowel; Pashto, however, has a phonemic nasal retroflex lateral flap. As mentioned above, many Indo-Aryan languages also possess a phonemic retroflex nasal flap that contrasts with the alveolar nasal stop.

=== Tapped fricatives ===
Voiced and voiceless tapped alveolar fricatives have been reported from a few languages. Flapped fricatives are possible but do not seem to be used. See voiced alveolar tapped fricative, voiceless alveolar tapped fricative.

== See also ==
- List of phonetics topics

== Notes ==
Place →	Labial					Coronal										Dorsal					Laryngeal			
Manner ↓	Bilabial		Labiodental		Linguolabial		Dental		Alveolar		Postalveolar		Retroflex		(Alveolo-)palatal		Velar		Uvular		Pharyngeal/epiglottal		Glottal	
Nasal	m̥	m	ɱ̊	ɱ		n̼	n̪̊	n̪	n̥	n	n̠̊	n̠	ɳ̊	ɳ	ɲ̊	ɲ	ŋ̊	ŋ	ɴ̥	ɴ				
Plosive	p	b	p̪	b̪	t̼	d̼	t̪	d̪	t	d			ʈ	ɖ	c	ɟ	k	ɡ	q	ɢ	ʡ		ʔ	
Sibilant affricate							t̪s̪	d̪z̪	ts	dz	t̠ʃ	d̠ʒ	tʂ	dʐ	tɕ	dʑ								
Non-sibilant affricate	pɸ	bβ	p̪f	b̪v			t̪θ	d̪ð	tɹ̝̊	dɹ̝	t̠ɹ̠̊˔	d̠ɹ̠˔			cç	ɟʝ	kx	ɡɣ	qχ	ɢʁ	ʡʜ	ʡʢ	ʔh	
Sibilant fricative							s̪	z̪	s	z	ʃ	ʒ	ʂ	ʐ	ɕ	ʑ								
Non-sibilant fricative	ɸ	β	f	v	θ̼	ð̼	θ	ð	θ̠	ð̠	ɹ̠̊˔	ɹ̠˔	ɻ̊˔	ɻ˔	ç	ʝ	x	ɣ	χ	ʁ	ħ	ʕ	h	ɦ
Approximant		β̞		ʋ				ð̞		ɹ		ɹ̠		ɻ		j		ɰ						˷
Tap/flap		ⱱ̟		ⱱ					ɾ̥	ɾ			ɽ̊	ɽ						ɢ̆		ʡ̆		
Trill	ʙ̥	ʙ							r̥	r		r̠	ɽ̊r̥	ɽr					ʀ̥	ʀ	ʜ	ʢ		
Lateral affricate									tɬ	dɮ			tꞎ	d𝼅	c𝼆	ɟʎ̝	k𝼄	ɡʟ̝						
Lateral fricative							ɬ̪		ɬ	ɮ			ꞎ	𝼅	𝼆	ʎ̝	𝼄	ʟ̝						
Lateral approximant								l̪	l̥	l		l̠	ɭ̊	ɭ	ʎ̥	ʎ	ʟ̥	ʟ		ʟ̠				
Lateral tap/flap									ɺ̥	ɺ			𝼈̊	𝼈		ʎ̆		ʟ̆						

		BL	LD	D	A	PA	RF	P	V	U
Implosive	Voiced	ɓ			ɗ		ᶑ	ʄ	ɠ	ʛ
Implosive	Voiceless	ɓ̥			ɗ̥		ᶑ̊	ʄ̊	ɠ̊	ʛ̥
Ejective	Stop	pʼ			tʼ		ʈʼ	cʼ	kʼ	qʼ
Ejective	Affricate		p̪fʼ	tθʼ	tsʼ	tʃʼ	tʂʼ	tɕʼ	kxʼ	qχʼ
Ejective	Fricative	ɸʼ	fʼ	θʼ	sʼ	ʃʼ	ʂʼ	ɕʼ	xʼ	χʼ
Ejective	Lateral affricate				tɬʼ			c𝼆ʼ	k𝼄ʼ	q𝼄ʼ
Ejective	Lateral fricative				ɬʼ					
Click (top: velar; bottom: uvular)	Tenuis	kʘ qʘ		kǀ qǀ	kǃ qǃ		k𝼊 q𝼊	kǂ qǂ		
Click (top: velar; bottom: uvular)	Voiced	ɡʘ ɢʘ		ɡǀ ɢǀ	ɡǃ ɢǃ		ɡ𝼊 ɢ𝼊	ɡǂ ɢǂ		
Click (top: velar; bottom: uvular)	Nasal	ŋʘ ɴʘ		ŋǀ ɴǀ	ŋǃ ɴǃ		ŋ𝼊 ɴ𝼊	ŋǂ ɴǂ	ʞ	
Click (top: velar; bottom: uvular)	Tenuis lateral				kǁ qǁ					
Click (top: velar; bottom: uvular)	Voiced lateral				ɡǁ ɢǁ					
Click (top: velar; bottom: uvular)	Nasal lateral				ŋǁ ɴǁ					
