= Cyclone Harvey =

Category 3 Australian region cyclone in 2005

Severe Tropical Cyclone Harvey
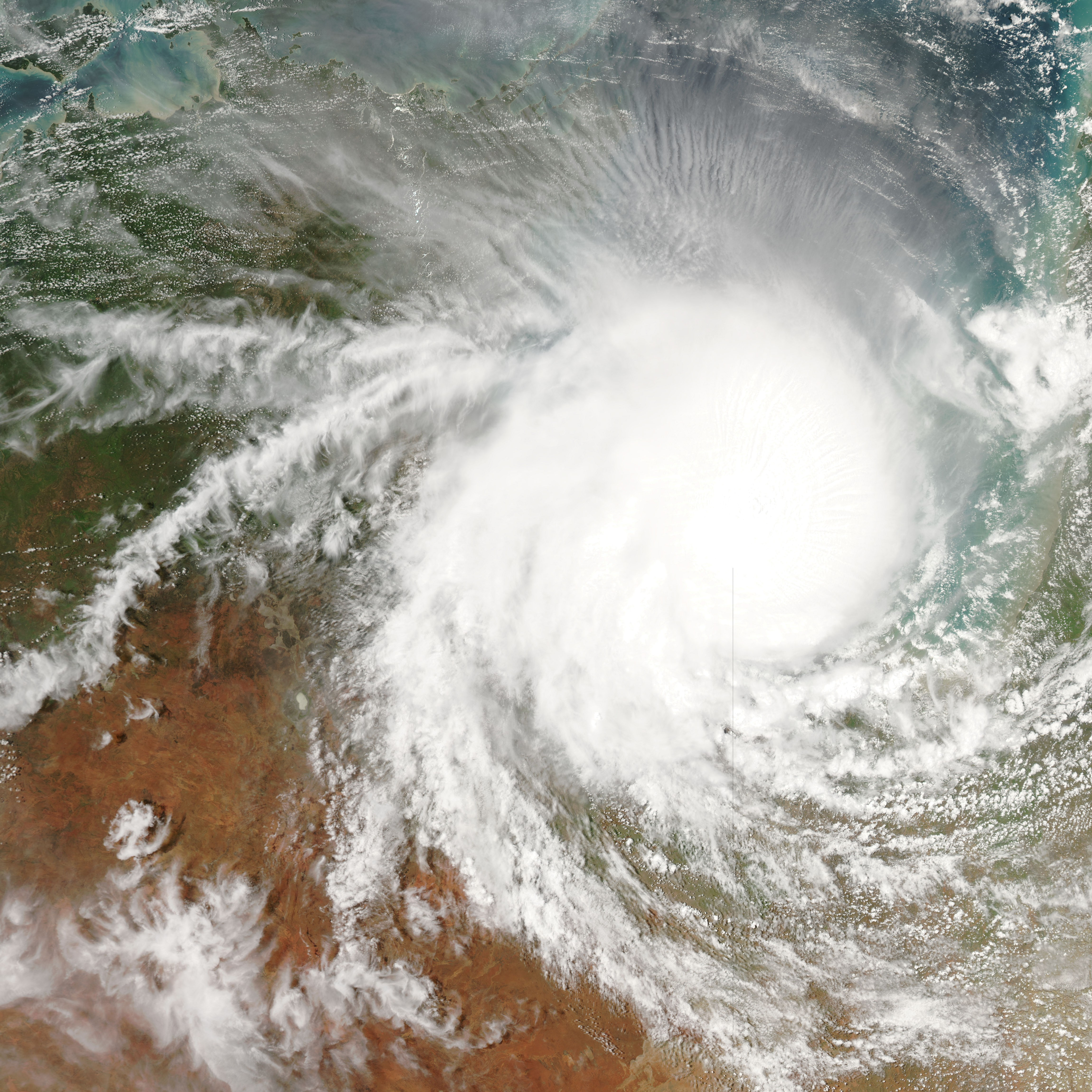
- Tropical Cyclone Harvey on 7 February 2005

Meteorological history
- Formed: 5 February 2005
- Dissipated: 7 February 2005

Category 3 severe tropical cyclone
- 10-minute sustained (BOM)
- Highest winds: 120 km/h (75 mph)
- Lowest pressure: 967 hPa (mbar); 28.56 inHg

Tropical storm
- 1-minute sustained (SSHWS/JTWC)
- Highest winds: 95 km/h (60 mph)
- Lowest pressure: 987 hPa (mbar); 29.15 inHg

Overall effects
- Fatalities: None
- Damage: $750,000 (2005 USD)
- Areas affected: Northern Territory, Queensland
- IBTrACS
- Part of the 2004–05 Australian region cyclone season

Severe Tropical Cyclone Harvey was a tropical cyclone that struck Queensland and the Northern Territory of Australia during the 2004–05 Australian region cyclone season. It had a minimum pressure of 967 mbar (hPa; 28.56 inHg) and maximum wind gusts of 220 kilometres per hour (140 mph).

== Meteorological history ==
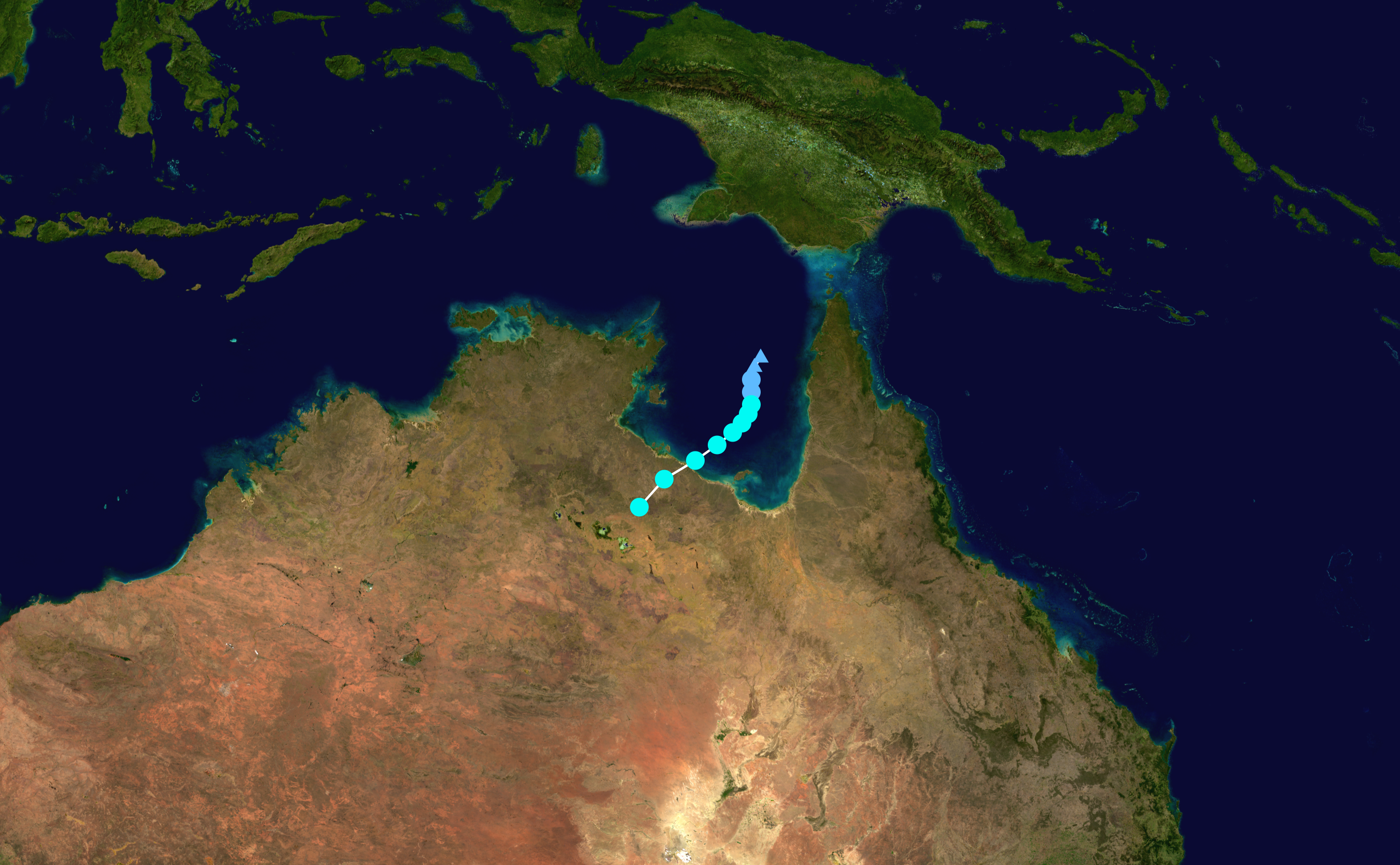
Map plotting the storm's track and intensity, according to the Saffir–Simpson scale Map key Saffir–Simpson scale Tropical depression (≤38 mph, ≤62 km/h) Tropical storm (39–73 mph, 63–118 km/h) Category 1 (74–95 mph, 119–153 km/h) Category 2 (96–110 mph, 154–177 km/h) Category 3 (111–129 mph, 178–208 km/h) Category 4 (130–156 mph, 209–251 km/h) Category 5 (≥157 mph, ≥252 km/h) Unknown Storm type Tropical cyclone Subtropical cyclone Extratropical cyclone, remnant low, tropical disturbance, or monsoon depression

A series of weak low pressure systems in the Gulf of Carpentaria and Timor Sea prompted the Bureau of Meteorology to go on Low Key Standby on 3 February 2005. While there was a moderate risk of tropical cyclone development, there were several weak lows, not a main well-defined low, and this led to High Key Standby being delayed until 4 February. On 5 February, the Brisbane Tropical Cyclone Warning Center (TCWC) issued an advice for municipalities along the southern side of the Gulf of Carpentaria as the Watch Phase was entered. On 6 February, Warning Phase commenced as Harvey strengthened to a Category 1 storm, and by 7 February, the cyclone had reached Category 3. The system then made landfall along the coast of the southern side of the gulf later that day.

== Preparations and impact ==
Warnings were issued along the coast between Mornington Island in Queensland and Port McArthur, Borroloola and Robinson River in the Northern Territory. Municipalities were warned to expect flooding and high tides.

At Robinson River, flooding led to "severe road damage," which was estimated to be $1 million AUD ($750,000 USD in 2005). The river rose nearly 16 metres (52 ft), coming one metre away from the local power station. Downed trees and minor building damage was also reported. At Pungalina Station, strong winds and 60 mm (2.4 in) of rain were reported, and many trees were uprooted or broken.

== Aftermath ==
The Bureau of Meteorology retired the name Harvey after its usage.

== See also ==
- 2004–05 Australian region cyclone season
