= Living Archive of Aboriginal Languages =

Digital literature archive

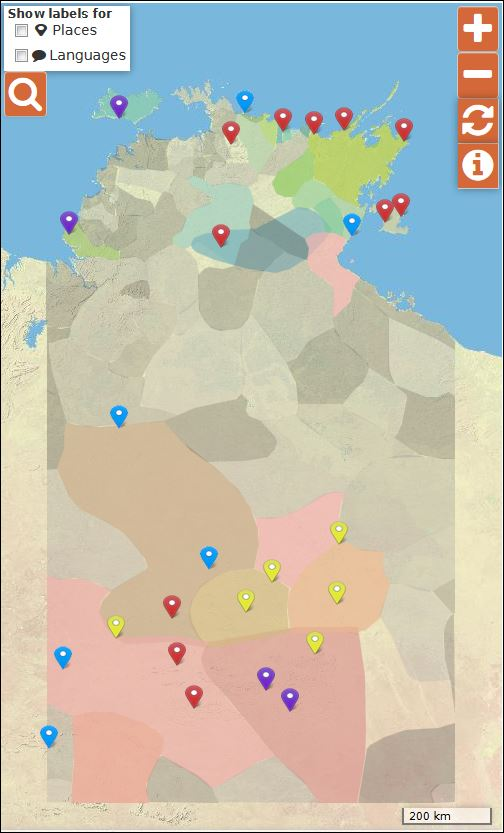
Language groups represented in the Living Archive of Aboriginal Languages and showing centres responsible for publishing the Indigenous language material

The Living Archive of Aboriginal Languages (LAAL) is a digital archive of literature in endangered languages of Australia, containing works in over forty Australian Aboriginal languages from the Northern Territory, Australia. The project to build the archive was initially funded in 2012 by the Australian Research Council, and was developed in collaboration with the Charles Darwin University as the lead institution, the Northern Territory Government and the Australian National University. Later partners include the Batchelor Institute of Indigenous Tertiary Education, the Northern Territory Library and the Northern Territory Catholic Education Office.

== Description ==
LAAL is an online archive of literature in languages of the Northern Territory.

== Development ==
Much of the literature in the archive was originally created as part of bilingual education programs in the Northern Territory from the early 1970s, but was in danger of being lost after Federal and Territory governments withdrew financial support for bilingual education.

The project to build the archive was initially funded in 2012 by the Australian Research Council and involved the collaboration of the Charles Darwin University as the lead institution, the Northern Territory Government and the Australian National University. The first stage of building the archive was to recover as many of these books as possible (about 4000), to catalogue and digitise these materials, and, with permission from the original creators, make them publicly available online.

Following the granting of a second round of funding by the Australian Research Council, the second stage of developing the archive began in 2014, focusing on further "search and rescue" of materials written by Indigenous authors in Northern Territory languages and also on engaging with community members, academics and schools on the use and enhancement of the collection. Later partners include the Batchelor Institute of Indigenous Tertiary Education, the Northern Territory Library and the Northern Territory Catholic Education Office.

The Archive continues to seek contributions of relevant materials from community members and researchers, provided the appropriate permissions are obtained.

== Access ==
All the materials in the Living Archive are publicly available online, and can also be accessed using the LAAL Reader App. One the website, users can find and access the materials by clicking on areas of a map or by browsing a list of locations, languages, authors or books. The materials are made available under a Creative Commons Attribution-NonCommercial-NoDerivs 3.0 Australia licence, and ownership of the stories and pictures remains with the Aboriginal language owners, creators of the work and their descendants.

== Use ==
The materials in the archive can be used for a range of purposes. In addition to building the collection, the second stage of developing the archive focuses on engaging with communities, schools, and researchers. This stage aims to find ways of tailoring collections for local use, such as in literacy and language learning, as well as expanding and improving the collection with community involvement, for example through contributions of new or audio-recorded versions of stories. It also aims to find ways archived materials can be used for classroom activities, for example on traditional knowledge, and seeks to connect students and academics with language authorities for collaborative work.

== Languages ==
As of 2015, the Living Archive of Aboriginal Languages had materials available in the following languages:

- Alawa
- Alyawarr
- Anindilyakwa
- Anmatyerr
- Arrarnta, Western
- Arrernte, Eastern
- Burarra
- Dalabon
- Dhaŋu
- Dhuwal
- Djambarrpuyngu (Dhuwal)
- Djinaŋ
- English
- Gumatj
- Gupapuyŋu
- Gurrogoni
- Gurindji
- Jawoyn
- Kaytetye
- Kriol
- Kunbarlang
- Kunwinjku
- Maung
- Murrinh-Patha
- Ndjébbana
- Ngandi
- Pintupi-Luritja
- Pitjantjatjara
- Rembarrnga
- Ritharrŋu
- Tiwi
- Warlpiri
- Warumungu
- Wubuy
- Yan-nhaŋu
- Yolŋu Matha

== See also ==
- Indigenous Australian literature
- Language revival
