= Wagiman language =

Indigenous Australian language

Wagiman
- Wageman
- Region: Pine Creek, Northern Territory, Australia
- Ethnicity: Wagiman
- Native speakers: 2 (2021)
- Language family: Language isolate

Language codes
- ISO 639-3: waq
- Glottolog: wage1238
- AIATSIS: N27
- ELP: Wagiman
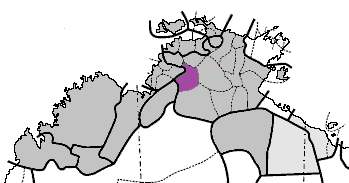
- Wagiman (purple), among other non-Pama-Nyungan languages (grey)

Wagiman, also spelt Wageman, Wakiman, Wogeman, and other variants, is a near-extinct Aboriginal Australian language spoken by only two elderly people, who live in and around Pine Creek, in the Katherine Region of the Northern Territory. The two last speakers, who acquired Wagiman as their first language, are sister and brother in their 70s, named Teresa Muyiwey Bandison and George Jabarlgarri Huddlestone..

The Wagiman language is notable within linguistics for its complex system of verbal morphology, which remains under-investigated, its possession of a cross-linguistically rare part of speech called a coverb, its complex predicates and for its ability to derive verbs from coverb roots, which is a unique feature among Australian languages.

As of 1999 Wagiman was expected to become extinct within the next generation, as the youngest generation spoke no Wagiman and understood very little. The 2011 Australian census recorded 30 speakers, while the 2016 Australian census recorded 18 speakers. Linguist Daniel Krauße worked on the language from 2019 to 2021 and reported only two remaining speakers. Without urgent language revival programs, the language is expected to become extinct very soon.

== Language and speakers ==
=== Relation with other languages ===
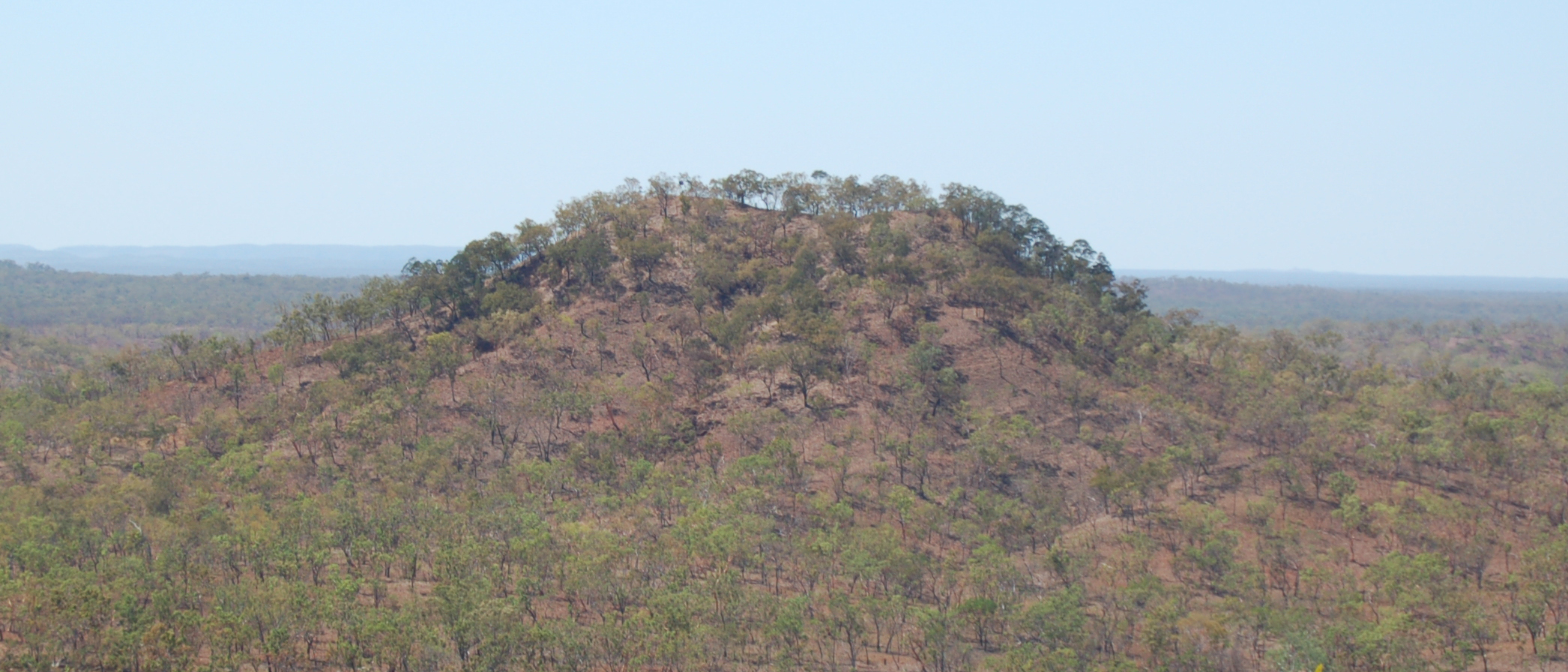
Jaben; the Frilled-Neck Lizard, one of the Wagiman people's sacred sites

Wagiman is a language isolate within the hypothetical Australian language family. It was once assumed to be a member of the adjacent Gunwinyguan family that stretches from Arnhem Land, throughout Kakadu National Park and south to Katherine, but this has since been rejected. Wagiman may still bear a remote relation with its neighbouring languages but this is yet to be demonstrated.

Francesca Merlan believes that Wagiman may be distantly related to the Yangmanic languages, citing that they both use verbal particles in a similar way, to the exclusion of neighbouring languages (such as Jawoyn and Mangarrayi). Stephen Wilson additionally notes some other similarities, such as in the pronominal prefixes and the marking of non-case-marked nominals. However both languages have a very low cognacy rate (shared vocabulary) of about 10%. Wagiman is also superficially similar to the neighbouring Gunwinyguan languages phonologically (both share a fortis/lenis stop contrast and a phonemic glottal stop) and to the Mirndi language Jaminjung-Ngaliwurru in the use of coverbs. Mark Harvey notes similarities in the verbal inflectional systems between Wagiman and the neighbouring Eastern Daly languages.

=== Speakers ===
Wagiman is the ancestral language of the Wagiman people, Aboriginal Australians whose traditional land, before colonisation, extended for hundreds of square kilometres from the Stuart Highway, throughout the Mid-Daly Basin, and across the Daly River. The land is highly fertile and well-watered, and contains a number of cattle stations, on which many members of the ethnic group used to work. These stations include Claravale, Dorisvale, Jindare, Oolloo and Douglas.

The language region borders Waray to the north, Mayali (Kunwinjku) and Jawoyn on the east, Wardaman and Jaminjung on the south, and Murrinh-Patha, Ngan'giwumirri and Malak Malak on the west. Before colonisation, the lands surrounding Pine Creek, extending north to Brock's Creek, were traditionally associated with another language group that is now extinct, believed to have been Wulwulam.

The dominant language of the region is Mayali, a dialect of Bininj Kunwok traditionally associated with the region surrounding Maningrida, in Western Arnhem Land. As it is a strong language with hundreds of speakers and a high rate of child acquisition, members of the Wagiman ethnic group gradually ceased teaching the Wagiman language to their children. As a result, many Wagiman people speak Mayali, while only a handful of elders continue to speak Wagiman.

In 1987 it was found that adults in the community understood the Wagiman language to a certain extent or knew only a few basic words, but speak Daly River Kriol as their daily language. The youngest generation understood very little Wagiman and spoke none. As of 1999 Wagiman was expected to become extinct within the next generation, as the youngest generation spoke no Wagiman and understood very little. In 2005 only 10 speakers were recorded, but the 2011 Australian census recorded 30 speakers, with the 2016 Australian census recording 18 speakers.

Apart from Mayali, Kriol, a creole language based on the vocabulary of English, is the lingua franca of the area. The Wagiman people are also partial speakers of a number of other languages, including Jaminjung, Wardaman and Dagoman.

=== Dialects ===
Wagiman speakers are conscious of a distinction between two dialects of Wagiman, which they refer to as matjjin norohma 'light language' and matjjin gunawutjjan 'heavy language'. The differences are minor and speakers have no difficulty understanding one another.

== Phonology and orthography ==
The Wagiman phonemic inventory is quite typical for a northern Australian language. It has six places of articulation with a stop and a nasal in each. There are also a number of laterals and approximants, a trill and a phonemic glottal stop (represented in the orthography by 'h'). Wagiman also has a vowel inventory that is standard for the north of Australia, with a system of five vowels.

=== Consonants ===
Stops that are fortis (or 'strong') are differentiated from those that are lenis (or 'weak') on the basis of length of closure, as opposed to the voice onset time (VOT), the period after the release of the stop before the commencement of vocal fold activity (or voice) which normally differentiates fortis and lenis stops in English and most other languages.

Lenis stops in Wagiman sound like English voiced stops and are therefore written using the Roman alphabet letters b, d and g. Fortis stops, however, sound more like voiceless stops in English, but are slightly longer than lenis stops. They are written with two voiceless letters, pp, tt and kk when they occur between two vowels.

Since the length of closure is defined in terms of time between the closure of the vocal tract after the preceding vowel, and the release before the following vowel, stops at the beginning or end of a word do not have a fortis-lenis contrast. Orthographically in Wagiman, word-initial stops are written using the voiced Roman letters (b, d and g), but at the end of a word, voiceless letters (p, t and k) are used instead.

| | | Peripheral | | Laminal | Apical | | Glottal |
| | | Bilabial | Velar | Palatal | Alveolar | Retroflex | Glottal |
|---|---|---|---|---|---|---|---|
| Plosive | Lenis | p~b [p] | k~g [k] | tj~j [c] | t~d [t] | rt~rd [ʈ] | h [ʔ] |
| Plosive | Fortis | pp [pː] | kk [kː] | ttj [cː] | tt [tː] | rtt [ʈː] | |
| Nasal | | m [m] | ng [ŋ] | ny [ɲ] | n [n] | rn [ɳ] | |
| Trill | | | | | rr [r] | | |
| Lateral | | | | | l [l] | rl [ɭ] | |
| Approximant | | w [w] | | y [j] | | r [ɻ] | |

=== Vowels ===
As with many languages of the top-end, Wagiman has a standard five-vowel system. However, a system of vowel harmony indicates that two sets of vowels are closely associated with each other. [ɛ] aligns closely with [ɪ] and similarly, [ɔ] merges with [ʊ].

In this respect, it is possible to analyse Wagiman's vowel inventory as historically deriving from a three-vowel system common among the languages from further south, but with the phonetic influence of a typically northern five-vowel system.

| | front | central | back |
|---|---|---|---|
| close | i [ɪ] | | u [ʊ] |
| mid | e [ɛ] | | o [ɔ] |
| open | | a [a] | |

=== Phonotactics ===
Each syllable of Wagiman contains an onset, a nucleus and an optional coda. This may be generalised to the syllable template CV(C). The coda may consist of any single consonant, a continuant and a glottal stop, or an approximant and any stop.

At the word level, Wagiman has a bimoraic minimum, meaning that if a word consists of a single syllable, it must have either a long vowel or a coda. Examples of monosyllabic words in Wagiman include yow [jɒʊ] 'yes', or jamh [ɟʌmʔ] 'eat.PERF'.

The retroflex approximant 'r' [ɻ] is not permitted word-initially and instead becomes a lateral 'l'. This only affects verb roots, as they are the only part of speech that takes prefixes and are therefore the only possible part of speech for which word-initial and word-medial environmental effects can be observed.

The verb ra-ndi 'throw', for instance, surfaces as la-ndi when inflected for third-person singular subjects (he/she/it), which are realised by invisible, or null morphemes. but as nga-ra-ndi when inflected for a first-person singular subject (I). When preceded by a syllable with a coda, the 'r' similarly moves to 'l', as in ngan-la-ndi 'he/she/it threw you'. In short, the retroflex approximant 'r' [ɻ] is only realised as 'r' when it occurs between two vowels. Elsewhere, it becomes a lateral approximant 'l'.

==== Heterorganic clusters ====
Consonant clusters across syllable boundaries do not assimilate for place in Wagiman as they do in many other languages. This means that a nasal in a syllable coda will not move to the position of the following syllable onset for ease of enunciation. In English and most other Indo-European languages with the exception of Russian, this movement occurs regularly, such that the prefix in-, for example, changes to im- when it precedes either a p, a b or an m.

in + possible → impossible
in + balance → imbalance
in + material → immaterial

Wagiman does not do this. A nasal in a coda retains its position regardless of the following consonant:

manyngardal 'tongue' [maɲŋaɖaɫ]
binkan 'bream' (fish spec.) [bɪnɡan]
ngan-bu-ni 's/he hit me' [ŋanbʊnɪ]

If Wagiman constrained against heterorganic clusters and assimilated them for place, as English does, these words would surface as [maŋŋaɖaɫ], [bɪŋɡan], and [ŋambʊnɪ].

==== Vowel harmony ====
High vowels assimilate in height to following mid vowels across syllable boundaries. That is, [ɪ] will become [ɛ], and [ʊ] will become [ɔ], when the following syllable contains a mid vowel; either [ɛ] or [ɔ].

mi- + -ge → mege
2SG.IMP {} 'put' {} {'you go and put it'}

mu- + -yobe → moyobe
2PL.IMP {} 'stay' {} {'you lot stay'}

Wagiman vowel harmony and other aspects of Wagiman phonotactics require further investigation. It is not known, for instance, whether vowel harmony equally affects unstressed syllables.

== Grammar ==
All grammatical information from Wilson, S. (1999) unless otherwise noted.

=== Parts of speech ===
The three most important parts of speech in Wagiman are verbs, coverbs and nominals. Apart from these, there are a multitude of verbal and nominal affixes, interjections and other particles. Pronouns class with nominals.

==== Nominals ====
Like many Australian languages, Wagiman does not categorically distinguish nouns from adjectives. These form one word class that is called nominals. Wagiman nominals take case suffixes (see below) that denote their grammatical or semantic role in the sentence. The grammatical cases are ergative and absolutive, and the semantic cases include instrumental (using), allative (towards), ablative (from), locative (at), comitative (with, having), privative (without, lacking), temporal (at the time of) and semblative (resembling). The dative case can be either grammatical or semantic, depending on the syntactic requirements of the verb.

Demonstratives are similarly considered nominals in Wagiman, and take the same case suffixes depending on their semantic and syntactic roles; their function within the sentence. That is, the demonstrative mahan 'this', or 'here' (root: mayh-), may take case just like any other nominal.

- mayh-yi this-ERG 'this one (did it)'
- mayh-ga this-ALL 'to here'

===== Examples of nominals =====
- guda 'fire', 'wood' [ɡʊda]
- wirin 'tree', 'stick' [wɪɻɪn]
- lagiban 'man' [laɡɪban]
- gordal 'head' [ɡɔɖaɫ]
- lagiriny 'tail' [laɡɪɻɪɲ]
- manyngardal 'tongue' [maɲŋaɖaɫ]

==== Pronouns ====
Pronouns are typologically nominals also, yet their morphosyntactic alignment is nominative–accusative rather than ergative–absolutive.

| | | | Nominative | Accusative | Genitive |
|---|---|---|---|---|---|
| 1st person | singular | | ngagun | nganung | nganing-gin |
| 1st person | dual | | nginyang | nginyang | nginyang-gin |
| 1st person | plural | EXCL | ngego | ngerreju | gerdo-gin |
| 1st person | plural | INCL | ngego | ngerre-ngana | gerdo-gin |
| 2nd person | singular | | ngigun | ngonggo | ngonggo-gin |
| 2nd person | plural | | ngogo | ngorruju | gordo-gin |
| 3rd person | singular | | ngonggega (rare) | nung | nung-gin |
| 3rd person | plural | | bogo (rare) | borruju | borro-gin |

The 3rd person singular and plural nominative forms, ngonggega and bogo, are labeled 'rare' because they are gradually becoming disused. Speakers prefer to use non-personal pronouns such as gayh- 'that' or gayh-gorden 'those'. Moreover, since the person and number of the subject is contained in the prefix of the verb, nominative free pronouns are often dropped.

===== Tripartite alignment =====
Ergative alignment of the case system

While the nominal case system distinguishes the ergative case from absolutive, the free pronouns distinguish nominative from accusative, as shown above. However, they inflect for ergative case as well, resulting in a tripartite case system, as in the following:

ngagun-yi ngonggo ngany-bu-ng
1SG.NOM-ERG 2SG.ACC 1sgA.2sgO-hit-PFV
'I hit you.'

Accusative alignment of the free pronoun system. A = Transitive agent S = Intransitive argument O = Transitive object

The nominative pronoun root in this instance, ngagun 'I', takes the ergative case suffix -yi to denote the fact that it is the agent of a transitive clause. Conversely, the same pronoun does not take the ergative case when acting as the argument of an intransitive clause:

ngagun maman nga-yu
1SG.NOM good 1SG-be.PRS
'I am good.'

The accusative pronouns on the other hand, may be accusative or dative, depending on the syntactic requirements of the verb. In the traditional terminology, these pronouns can be either direct or indirect objects.

ngagun-yi nga-nanda-yi nung
1SG.NOM-ERG 1sgA.3sgO-see-PST 3SG.ACC
'I saw him/her.'

nga-nawu-ndi wahan nung
1sgA.3sgO-give-PST water 3SG.ACC
'I gave the water to him/her.'

For these reasons, the pronouns are also labeled base for nominative–ergative pronouns, and oblique for accusative–dative pronouns.

===== Genitive pronouns =====
In the table above, genitive pronouns all end with -gin, which is separated orthographically by a hyphen that normally divides morphemes. The -gin form here is not a separate morpheme and cannot be lexically segmented; there is no such word as nganing that would be formed by removing -gin from nganing-gin 'my/mine'. The fact that the genitive forms have regular endings across the entire pronoun paradigm may have been a historical accident.

This cannot be a nominal suffix like those listed above, since it may not attach to other nominals (*warren-gin lari 'the child's hand', but warren-gu lari 'the child's hand'). Furthermore, the genitive pronouns may take a further case suffix, as in the example:

goron nganing-gin-ba
house my-ALL
'To my house.'

This would be prohibited by the restriction against case stacking in Wagiman if the genitive -gin were a case suffix.

==== Verbs ====
Verbs are a class of word in Wagiman which contains fewer than 50 members. As it is a closed class, no more verbs are possible. They are often monosyllabic verb roots and all are vowel-final. Wagiman verbs obligatorily inflect for person and number of core arguments, and for the tense and aspect of the clause. A small set of verbs may take a non-finite suffix -yh, in which it may not be further inflected for person or tense. That non-finite verb must then co-occur with another auxiliary verb.

===== Examples of verbs =====
Each verb is listed with its past tense marker, which is the second morpheme. Pronunciation given where appropriate.

- bu-ni 'hit'
- di-nya 'come'
- la-ndi 'throw'
- rinyi-ra 'fall'
- nanda-yi 'see' [nandaɪ]
- yu-nginy 'be' [jʊŋɪɲ]

==== Coverbs ====
There are so far over 500 recorded coverbs in Wagiman, and more are discovered with continuing research. Compared with verbs, coverbs are far more numerous and far more semantically rich. Verbs express simple, broad meanings such as yu- 'be', ya- 'go' and di- 'come', while coverbs convey more specific, semantically narrow meanings such as barnhbarn-na 'make footprints', lerdongh-nga 'play (a didgeridoo)' or murr-ma 'wade through shallow water using your feet to search for something'.

Coverbs however, cannot inflect for person and cannot, in themselves, head finite clauses. If they are to act as the head of a clause, they must combine with a verb, thereby forming a bipartite verbal compound, commonly called a complex predicate.

===== Examples of coverbs =====
Each is listed with the -ma suffix (or its allomorph), which signals aspectual unmarkedness.

- liri-ma 'swim' [lɪɻɪma]
- dabaley-ma '(go) around)' [dabalema]
- gorrh-ma 'fish' [ɡɔrʔma]
- dippart-ta 'jump' [dɪbˑaɖˑa]
- wirrnh-na 'whistle' [wɪrʔna]

=== Syntax ===
Wagiman is a prefixing language, which, in the context of typology of Australian languages, may refer to its genealogical classification as well as its syntactic properties. Wagiman, along with other Gunwinyguan languages, inflects verbs for person and number of the subject obligatorily, and optionally for the object. In this respect Wagiman displays characteristics of a head-marking language. However, Wagiman also behaves as a dependent-marking language, in that nominals are case marked as to their grammatical or semantic roles, such as ergative (the subject of a transitive clause) or absolutive (the object of a transitive clause or the subject of an intransitive clause).

==== Morphology ====
Wagiman is a morphologically rich language and each part of speech has its own set of associated bound morphemes, some of which are obligatory, while others are optional.

===== Verbs =====
The verbal prefix contains information about the person and number of the subject, sometimes also the person and number of the object, as well as obligatory information about the tense of the clause. Furthermore, a verbal suffix conveys further information regarding tense and aspect. While only a small number of tense and aspect affixes exist, the interplay between those in the verbal prefix and in the suffix, can generate more highly specified temporal and aspectual clauses.

Further to these affixes, verbs may be marked for the number of the subject, be it dual or plural, and also for clusivity; whether the listener is included in the described event (inclusive) or is excluded from the event (exclusive).

The verbal morphology of tense suffixes in Wagiman is irregular. Of the small inventory of inflecting verbs, many have their own unique tense suffixes, while other tense suffixes are common to several verbs, and while some rudimentary verb classes can be identified - stance verbs always take the past tense suffix -nginy /ŋɪɲ/, for instance - the tense suffixes must be learned for each individual verb.

The prefixes on the other hand, are regular for each verb, although the complete paradigm of verb prefixes is highly complex. They encode three variables: person, number and tense, and are only segmentable in a few cases; one prefix cannot be separated into the three parts. Ngani- for example, encodes second-person singular agent ('you'), first-person singular patient/undergoer ('me') as well as past tense.

ngani-bu-ng
2sgA.1sgO.PST-hit-PFV
'You hit me.'

===== Nominals =====
Nominal morphology is significantly less complex than that of the verb. There are a number of case suffixes, denoting ergative, absolutive, dative, allative, locative, ablative, semblative, temporal, instrumental and so on.

Apart from the grammatical cases, ergative and absolutive, which are necessary to construct meaningful sentences, an entire range of semantic cases occur with very high frequency, even when their meaning can be expressed without using case. In the following examples, the former, in which no case is used, is far less common than the latter:

wuji nga-nga-gondo-n garradin
NEG IRR-1SG-have-PRS money
'I don't have any money.'

garrad-nehen nga-yu
money-PRIV 1SG.PRS-be
'I am without money.' or 'I am penniless.'

There are also some bound particles, which appear to function in much the same syntactic manner as cases, but which are not considered 'case', for theoretical reasons. -binyju /bɪɲɟʊ/ 'only' is one of these nominal particles, as in:

gubiji-binyju bula-ndi
bone-only 3SG.leave-PST
'S/he left only the bones.'

Nominals are also marked for number with a suffix that adjoins directly to the root, inside the case suffix. -giwu 'two', for example, would attach to the nominal root before the case, as in:

lamarra-giwu-yi nganba-badi-na
dog-two-ERG 3plA.1sgO-bite-PST
'the two dogs bit me.'

As cases cannot be stacked in Wagiman, these number suffixes cannot be called case suffixes, whereas the nominal suffixes discussed above (such as -binyju 'only'), show the same syntactic distribution - they occur in the same place - and therefore may be analysed as cases themselves.

===== Coverbs =====
Coverbs also have their own set of inflectional morphemes, such as aspect, but may also take semantic case suffixes (all those listed above except for ergative and absolutive). For instance, a coverb may take the dative case to convey intention, or purpose, as in:

liri-ma-gu
swim-ASP-DAT
'for swimming'

Coverbs are categorially differentiated from nominals though, in that a nominal may not take the aspectual suffixes that a coverb obligatorily takes.

The morpheme that is glossed as aspect in the above example, referred to in the literature as the -ma suffix, denotes aspectual unmarkedness. Its absence signifies perfective aspect, and it may be further suffixed with -yan, producing -ma-yan, to denote continuous or imperfective aspect.

The -ma suffix exhibits regular allomorphy; it assimilates in place and manner of articulation to any preceding obstruent or nasal, but not to any preceding lateral, rhotic or approximant. That is, it remains -ma following vowels, or following the consonants [r], [l], [w] and [j], but when it follows [p], for instance, it assimilates in manner and place, and becomes /-pa/, as in dup-pa 'sit'.

- liri + ma → liri-ma
- wal + ma → wal-ma
- bey + ma → bey-ma
- yorony + ma → yorony-nya
- datj + ma → datj-ja

The inclusion of the glottal stop in certain words, is ineffective to the surface realisation of the -ma suffix; it will change, or remain unchanged, according to whichever segment precedes the glottal stop, as in:

- wunh + ma → wunh-na
- gayh + ma → gayh-ma

Cross-linguistically, the-ma suffix may be related to a coverbial suffix in Jaminjung, a language in which coverb roots occur without any aspect markers, but are then suffixed with -mayan, which marks continuous aspect. This coverb suffix bears a striking resemblance to the sum of the Wagiman -ma suffix and the continuous aspect suffix -yan, which always occur in tandem on coverbs. Together, -ma and -yan perform the same semantic function as Jaminjung -mayan. Precisely what the relationship holds between these suffixes; whether one language borrowed from the other, or whether each language inherited them from earlier languages, is not at all clear.

==== Reduplication ====
Further to derivational and inflectional morphemes, Wagiman coverbs and nominals often undergo reduplication, whereby a part, or often the entirety of the root, is repeated. Reduplication can convey a multitude of meanings. When coverbs are reduplicated, the resulting derived coverb may involve added meaning components such as iterativity, duration or habituality.

dabulp-pa ga-ya nu-naw-ma
smoke-ASP 3SG.PRS.go lots
'S/he smokes lots.'

dabuldabulp ga-ya
smoke.REDUP 3SG.PRS.go
'S/he smokes all the time.'

When nominals are derived by reduplication, the added meaning is usually one of plurality. However, since both a dual and a plural nominal suffix exist, -giwu and -guju respectively, nominal reduplication is rare.

==== Complex predicates ====
A complex predicate is the combination of more than one element, more than one individual word, to convey the information involved in a single event. For instance, the event swim is conveyed in Wagiman using a combination of a verb ya- 'go' and a coverb liri-ma 'swimming'. There is no verb in Wagiman that, on its own, conveys the event of swimming.

Bipartite verbal compounds such as these are not peculiar to any language in particular. They are in fact very common, and may even occur in every language, albeit with varying frequency. English has a number of complex predicates, include go sightseeing, have breakfast and take (a) bath. The event described by go sightseeing is unable to be described using a single verb sightsee; inflections like sightsaw and sightseen are ungrammatical. An event like take (a) bath, however, may be described by a single verb bathe, but it arguably has a slightly different meaning. Take (a) bath, in any case, is far more common.

==== Verbalisation ====
Wagiman is differentiated from other Australian languages in that it has a regular and productive process of verbalisation, whereby coverbs can become verbs and act as the independent head of a clause. Despite being fully productive, meaning that all coverbs may undergo verbalisation, in practice only a handful of coverbs are commonly verbalised. The process appears to be unique to Wagiman within Australian languages.

Verbalisation involves re-analysing the entire coverb - including its suffix -ma, which serves merely to indicate that it is unmarked for aspect - as a verb root, and then to apply the usual obligatory verbal inflection affixes for person, number and tense. As there is no discrete morpheme that serves as a 'verbaliser', the process is one of conversion.

== See also ==
- Complex predicates
- Coverbs
- Gunwinyguan languages
- Light verbs
- Non-Pama–Nyungan languages
