= Ngalakgan language =

Australian Aboriginal language

Ngalakan
- Ngalakgan
- Native to: Australia
- Region: Northern Territory
- Ethnicity: Ngalakgan
- Native speakers: 2 partial (2018)
- Language family: Arnhem: Gunwinyguan; Rembarngic (Jala); Ngalakan

Language codes
- ISO 639-3: nig
- Glottolog: ngal1293
- AIATSIS: N77
- ELP: Ngalakgan

Ngalakan (Ngalakgan) is an Australian Aboriginal language of the Ngalakgan people. It has not been fully acquired by children since the 1930s. It is one of the Northern Non-Pama–Nyungan languages formerly spoken in the Roper river region of the Northern Territory. It is most closely related to Rembarrnga. Only two partial speakers remain of Ngalakgan as of 2018.

== Phonology ==
=== Consonants ===
Ngalakan has a typical Australian consonant inventory, with many coronal places of articulation (see Coronals in Indigenous Australian languages), including nasals at every stop place, and four liquids, but no fricatives. Baker (1999, 2008) analyses the language as having both geminate and singleton realizations of every plosive consonant. Merlan (1983), however, argues that there is a fortis–lenis contrast, and thus two series of plosives rather than the one shown here. Lenis/short plosives have weak contact and intermittent voicing, while fortis/long plosives have full closure, a more powerful release burst, and no voicing. Similar contrasts are found in other Gunwinyguan languages, such as Bininj Kunwok, Jawoyn, Dalabon, Rembarrnga, Ngandi, as well as in the neighboring Yolngu languages.

	Peripheral		Laminal	Apical		Glottal
	Bilabial	Velar	Palatal	Alveolar	Retroflex	Glottal
Nasal	m	ŋ	ɲ	n	ɳ	
Stop	p	k	c	t	ʈ	ʔ
Tap				ɾ		
Lateral				l	ɭ	
Approximant	w		j	ɻ		

=== Vowels ===
	Front	Back
High	i	u
Mid	e	o
Low	a	

== Features ==
Ngalakgan is syntactically free, with pragmatically determined word order.

There is free word order, with no syntactically governed positions for subject, object, verb etc. in a sentence. All this information is encoded in the morphology, which results in highly complex word structures. Interpreting these complex words correctly is crucial in determining what the speaker is trying to say.

Unlike most polysynthetic languages, Ngalakgan is almost entirely agglutinating. Compounding is a productive process in Ngalakan which applies to all major lexical categories: noun+adjective, noun+verb adverb+verb. Suffixation for argument (ergative, genitive, dative), local semantic roles (locative, allative, ablative, perlative) and number occurs.
