= Warray language =

Australian Aboriginal language

Warray
- Native to: Australia
- Region: Adelaide River, Northern Territory
- Ethnicity: Awarai, Wulwulam
- Extinct: c. 2000
- Language family: Arnhem ?: Gunwinyguan; Warrayic; Warray
- Dialects: Waray; ?Wulwulam = Ngorrkkowo?

Language codes
- ISO 639-3: wrz
- Glottolog: wara1290 Warray wulw1234 Wulwulam
- AIATSIS: N25
- ELP: Warray

Warray (Waray) is an extinct Australian Aboriginal language of the Gunwinyguan family spoken in the Adelaide River area of the Northern Territory.

Wulwulam (Worrwolam) may have been a dialect. Ngorrkkowo may have been another name for Wulwulam.

== Classification ==
Within the Gunwinyguan language family, Warray is closest to Jawoyn, followed by Uwinymil. Kungarakany also shares similarities with the rest of the family, though it is not as well known as the other languages, and Larrakia, Wulna, Limilngan and Wagiman are only possibly related. Malak-Malak is very unlikely to be related, and if it were, it would be very distant from Warray.

== Geographical distribution ==
The Warray traditionally occupied the Margaret and Adelaide River valleys. The Uwinymil lived to the east along the Mary River, the Wagiman were found along the Douglas River to the south, the Mulluk-Mulluk lived southwest of the Warray, on the Tabletop Range to the west lived the Kungarakany, the Larrakia people were distributed northwest of the Warray alongn the Darwin and Manton Rivers, to the north of the Warray were the Wulna people, and the Limilngan were found northeast near Mount Bundy Station.

== History ==
Traditional Warray life had been interrupted by the 1930s. By the 1980s, only four or five fluent speakers were left of Warray. In a 1999 paper, according to Mark Harvey, there were "very few" speakers left by then.

== Phonology ==
Where different from IPA, orthographical equivalents are presented in ⟨angle brackets⟩.

=== Consonants ===
Consonants
		Bilabial	Alveolar	Palatal	Velar
Stop	short	p	t	c ⟨tj⟩	k
Stop	long	pː	tː	cː ⟨tj:⟩	kː
Nasal		m	n	ɲ ⟨nj⟩	ŋ ⟨ng⟩
Lateral			l		
Trill			r		
Semivowel		w		j ⟨y⟩	

The phonemic contrast between short and geminate stops is highly restricted, only being distinctive intervocalically in the middle of a word. Most occurrences of long stops are caused by the -u allomorph of the dative case. Very few words have intrinsically long stops in this environment; only a single minimal pair exists, kaku 'grandfather' : kakːu~kakːwuy 'after'; the functional load is almost nonexistent for long stops, and most instances of them are predictable. Stops at the end of a word are commonly unreleased or reduced to the glottal stop [ʔ].

=== Vowels ===
Vowels
	Front	Back
Close	i	u
Mid	ɛ ⟨e⟩	ɔ ⟨o⟩
Open	a	

/i/ is articulated as [ɪ] always when short, and when lengthened, [ɪː] is seemingly in free variation with [iː]. /ɛ/ ranges in articulation from [ɛ] to [æ]; when found finally, it is "indistinguishable from /a/". In closed syllables, /u/ is realized as [ʊ]; in open syllables, the realizations [u] and [o] are in free variation. The other phonemes, /ɔ, a/ do not vary in their pronunciation.

Vowel length is not phonemic; vowels are lengthened in monosyllabic words, and in open syllables of polysyllabic words, though not when the following syllable begins with /r/.

== Morphology ==
=== Case ===
Warray has a "well-developed" case system, according to Harvey.

Warray cases
Case	Warray
absolutive	-∅
ergative/instrumental	-yi
comitative	-yiwu
dative	-(w)u
allative/locative	-lik
perlative	-ba
ablative/causal	-yang

Where -yi functions as the ergative, it is not obligatory. Subjects of transitive verbs can also be marked with the absolutive.

== Vocabulary ==
The following basic vocabulary items of Warray are from Tryon (1968).

no.	gloss	Warrai
1	head	anbam
2	hair	meǰa
3	eyes	andum
4	nose	ange
5	ear	anganïm
6	tooth	anlætma
7	tongue	anǰæn
8	shoulder	anmunak
9	elbow	angunmuŋ
10	hand	ænnæbæ
11	breasts	čœčœč
12	back	angibæ
13	belly	anmiɲ
14	navel	anlanǰɛrak
15	heart	andoy
16	urine	wul
17	excrete	ŋuk
18	thigh	anǰatot
19	leg	angaRa
20	knee	anbat
21	foot	anŋobæ
22	skin	anwik
23	fat	anli
24	blood	kurač
25	bone	anmɔ
26	man	naŋ
27	woman	alguwulbæ
28	father	pibi
29	mother	pulbul
30	grandmother	wæče
31	policeman	aǰamɔrɔ
32	spear	bɔkɔ
33	woomera	ǰon
34	boomerang	buran
35	nullanulla	waRawaRa
36	hair-belt	čaman
37	canoe	pamuɲ
38	axe	čočo
39	dilly bag	liče
40	fire	wæk
41	smoke	wudl
42	water	wik
43	cloud	pamŋul
44	rainbow	kulunǰe
45	barramundi	madukadl
46	sea	čænbadlk
47	river	popal
48	stone	kïre
49	ground	yul
50	track	čap
51	dust	luRa
52	sun	miradl
53	moon	kaRaŋ
54	star	mœlœbe
55	night	ŋečpa
56	tomorrow	lɔrewɔ
57	today	waɲelak
58	big	amoǰïlk
59	possum	wuǰa
60	dog	ŋire
61	tail	anlaɲ
62	meat	waŋ
63	snake	pælam
64	red kangaroo	čaniɲ
65	porcupine	kuwaraŋ
66	emu	ŋuriɲ
67	crow	wagæ
68	goanna	laliɲ
69	blue tongue lizard	walmadatatɔ
70	mosquito	ŋadl
71	sugar-bag	bɔk
72	camp	læ
73	black	anguǰikɔ
74	white	andɔrɔkɔ
75	red	anbikpitu
76	one	anǰærɛɲ
77	two	kɛraŋludl
78	when?	ambawayɛn
79	what?	ɲiɲaŋ
80	who?	abɛŋ
81	I	ɲæk
82	you	ŋuɲ
83	he	agala
84	grass	čitpam
85	vegetable food	moya
86	tree	yumbal
87	leaf	mala
88	pandanus	mæRiɲ
89	ironwood	læŋwalakɔ
90	ripe	anǰɔlɔŋ
91	good	anliwɔ
92	bad	awarɔ
93	blind	ǰæmiɲɔ
94	deaf	awuRïme
95	saliva	kïǰaniɲ
