= Kunbarlang language =

Australian Aboriginal language of northern Australia

Kunbarlang
- Warlang
- Native to: Australia
- Region: Arnhem Land
- Ethnicity: Gambalang
- Extinct: by 2016
- Revival: by 2020
- Language family: Arnhem: Gunwinyguan; Gunwinggic; Kunbarlang
- Dialects: Djimbilirri; Gurrigurri; Gumunggurdu; Marrabanggu; Marranumbu; Gunguluwala

Language codes
- ISO 639-3: wlg
- Glottolog: kunb1251
- AIATSIS: N69
- ELP: Kunbarlang
- Kunbarlang is classified as Severely Endangered by the UNESCO Atlas of the World's Languages in Danger.

Kunbarlang, or Gunbarlang, is an Australian Aboriginal language in northern Australia with multiple dialects. Other names are Gungalang and Warlang. Speakers are multilingual in Kunwinjku and Mawng. Most of the Gunbarlang people now speak Kunwinjku.

The language is part of a language revival project, as a critically endangered language.

== Classification ==
Kunbarlang has been proposed to be included into the marne group of Gunwinyguan family, making its closest relatives the Central Gunwinyguan languages Bininj Kunwok and Dalabon. The label marne refers to the phonological shape of the benefactive applicative affix common to all three languages (as opposed to the bak languages to the east, e.g. Rembarrnga, Ngandi and Wubuy/Nunggubuyu).

== Geographic distribution ==
Some Kunbarlang speakers live in Warruwi on South Goulburn Island and Maningrida. Historically, it was also spoken in Gunbalanya.

== Phonology ==
=== Consonants ===
		Labial	Alveolar	Retroflex	Palatal	Velar	Glottal
Plosive	voiceless	p	t	ʈ	c	k	ʔ
Plosive	tense	pː	tː	ʈː	cː	kː	
Nasal		m	n	ɳ	ɲ	ŋ	
Lateral			l	ɭ			
Rhotic			ɾ	ɻ			
Approximant		w			j		

/ɾ/ can also be heard as a trill [r].

=== Vowels ===
	Front	Central	Back
High	i		u
Mid	e		o
Low		a	

== Grammar ==
Kunbarlang is a polysynthetic language with complex verb morphology. It includes polypersonal agreement, incorporation, and a number of derivational affixes. Word order in a (transitive) clause is SVO or SOV.

=== Morphosyntax ===
Morphology is primarily agglutinating. Verbal morphology (rather than case marking or syntax) encodes a significant part of grammatical relations.

==== Verbal ====
The verb includes obligatory agreement with its core arguments in the form of bound pronouns. The subject/agent prefix precedes the object prefix. Subject prefixes form four mood series: positive indicative, "non-performative", future/intentional, and potential.

The verb features derivational affixes, such as benefactive, directional, and TAM.

==== Nominal ====
Case in not marked on nouns and free pronouns, but bound pronouns follow nominative-accusative alignment.

Kunbarlang distinguishes five noun classes on demonstratives (M, F, plants, body-parts, and inanimate), but only four on other constituents (collapsing the latter two).

== Language revival ==
As of 2020, Kunbarlang is one of 20 languages prioritised as part of the Priority Languages Support Project, being undertaken by First Languages Australia and funded by the Department of Communications and the Arts. The project aims to "identify and document critically-endangered languages — those languages for which little or no documentation exists, where no recordings have previously been made, but where there are living speakers".
