= Dalabon language =

Australian Aboriginal language

Dalabon
- Ngalkbun
- Native to: Australia
- Region: Arnhem Land
- Ethnicity: Dangbon = Dalabon
- Native speakers: 1–2 (2025)
- Language family: Arnhem: Gunwinyguan; Marne; Central Gunwinyguan; Dalabon

Language codes
- ISO 639-3: ngk
- Glottolog: ngal1292
- AIATSIS: N60
- ELP: Dalabon
- Location within Australia
- Coordinates: 13.98°S 133.94°E

Dalabon is a Gunwinyguan language of Arnhem Land, Australia. It is a severely endangered language, with perhaps as one or two fluent speakers remaining as of 2025. Dalabon is also known as Dangbon (the Kune or Mayali name), Ngalkbun (the Jawoyn name), and Buwan (the Rembarrnga name).

== Classification ==
Dalabon belongs to the Gunwinyguan languages branch of the Arnhem languages; its nearest relatives are Kunwinjku, Kune, Mayali (varieties often grouped together as Bininj Kunwok), and Kunbarlang. Its next closest relatives are Rembarrnga, and other languages within the Gunwinyguan family, including Jawoyn, Ngalakgan, Ngandi, Wubuy, and Enindhilyakwa.

== Official status ==
Dalabon has no official status. Local schools spent years holding sporadic programs teaching Dalabon, but these operations did not receive enough governmental support. Therefore, the condition of the programs is still vulnerable.

== Dialects ==
Given the limited number of Dalabon speakers, the study of dialects has become challenging to investigate. Speakers recall a distinction between two different types of speech, dalabon-djurrkdjurrk ("fast." "lively") and dalabon-murduk ("articulate"). However, no significant difference has been found between the two speeches.

== Phonology and orthography ==
=== Consonants ===
There are 22 or 23 phonemic consonants in Dalabon, depending on the phonemic status of /h/. A table containing the consonant phonemes is given below with their orthographic representation (in angle brackets).

Dalabon consonant phonemes
		Peripheral		Apico-		Lamino-Palatal	Glottal
		Velar	Bilabial	Alveolar	Retroflex	Lamino-Palatal	Glottal
Stops	Lenis (short)	⟨k⟩ /k/	⟨b⟩ /p/	⟨d⟩ t	⟨rd⟩ /ʈ/	⟨dj⟩ /c/	⟨h⟩ /ʔ/
Stops	Fortis (long)	⟨kk⟩ /kː/	⟨bb⟩ /pː/	⟨dd⟩ /tː/	⟨rdd⟩ /ʈː/	⟨djj⟩ /cː/	
Nasal		⟨ng⟩ /ŋ/	⟨m⟩ /m/	⟨n⟩ /n/	⟨rn⟩ /ɳ/	⟨nj⟩ /ɲ/	
Lateral				⟨l⟩ /l/	⟨rl⟩ /ɭ/		
Rhotic				⟨rr⟩ /r/	⟨r⟩ /ɻ/		
Semi-vowel			⟨w⟩ /w/			⟨y⟩ /j/	
Fricatives							⟨H⟩ (/h/)

=== Vowels ===
There are 6 vowels in Dalabon. A table containing the vowel phonemes is given below with their orthographic representation (in angle brackets).

Dalabon vowel phonemes
	Front	Central	Back
High	⟨i⟩ /i/	⟨û⟩ /ɨ/	⟨u⟩ /u/
mid	⟨e⟩ /e/		⟨o⟩ /o/
low		⟨a⟩ /a/	

=== Phonotactics ===
Like many Australian languages, Dalabon restricts the alveolar trill rr [r] from occurring word-initially.

The glottal stop h [ʔ] is also restricted to occurring in syllable codas in Dalabon, as is the case for most Australian languages with this segment; however, the glottal stop is also permitted within prosodic words rather than restricted to their right edge.

Long (or fortis) stops are characteristically limited to word-medial position, just as they are in other Central Arnhem languages featuring a fortis/lenis (or short/long) stop contrast.

The syllable structure of Dalabon is CV(C)(C)(C), or more specifically:

CV(L)(N)(h) or CV(L)(S)

where:

- L is a liquid consonant (lateral or rhotic)
- N is a nasal consonant
- S is a peripheral consonant
- h is a glottal consonant.

Such complex codas are not unusual, and all combinations are enumerated as follows (words and translations taken from the dictionary).

==== Complex coda of two consonants ====
C2 C1	_k	_b	_ng	_h
l_	yalkngalk /jalk.ŋalk/ "native bee sp."	kolb /kolp/ "sound of spear slotting into spearthrower"	kalngbuy /kalŋ.buj/ "initiation ritual"	kolh-no /kolʔ.no/ "liquid, water"
rl_	borlkmû /boɭk.mɨ/ "(to) fall out"	borlbmû /boɭp.mɨ/ "(to) be accustomed to"		lurlh(mû) /luɭʔ(.mɨ)/ "hop of a riverine wallaby"
rr_	kerrkban /kerk.ban/ "(to) dodge"	yang-warrbmû /jaŋ.warp.mɨ/ "(to) tell lies"	marrngkidj /marŋ.kic/ "sorcerer, clever man"	bukarrh /bu.karʔ/ "top (of something)"
r_	berk /beɻk/ "deaf adder"	wirbmang /wiɻp.maŋ/ "(to) pull out from flesh"	kerng-no /keɻŋ.no/ "jaw"	warhdû /waɻʔ.dɨ/ "devil, white person"
ng_				wanjingh /wa.ɲiŋʔ/ "one"
m_				njimhmû /ɲimʔ.mɨ/ "(to) wink"
n_				kanh /kanʔ/ "this (identified)"
rn_				nornhnornh /noɳʔ.noɳʔ/ "stone axe"
nj_				keninjhbi /ke.niɲʔ.bi/ "whatsit, whosit"

==== Complex coda of three consonants ====
C2,C3 C1	_ngh
l_	kalngHmû /kalŋhmɨ/ "(to) climb"
rl_	njorlnghmû /ɲoɭŋʔmɨ/ "(to) gobble up"
rr_	ngarnarrngh /ŋaɳarŋʔ/ "marble tree"
r_	modjarngh /mocaɻŋʔ/ "ground honey"

=== Phonological processes ===
Dalabon has a pattern of eliding unstressed vowels and unstressed syllables. For example, the word /'cabale/ 'shoulder blade' is often realized as ['cable].

=== Prosody ===
The location of phrasal stress in Dalabon appears one or two peaks with an initial rise into the first peak at the left edge of the constituent and a final fall at the right edge of the constituent.

== Grammar ==
Although there is no complete grammatical description of the language, a number of aspects of Dalabon grammar have been described, including its bound pronominal system, polysynthetic word structure, verb conjugations, the use of subordination strategies, nominal subclasses, the demonstrative system, and the use of optional ergativity.

=== Morphology ===
The structure of Dalabon verbs:

-12	-11	-10	-9	-8	-7	-6	-5	-4	-3	-2	-1	0	1	2	3
Obj pron	Subj pron		SEQ	CAUS	MISC	BEN/INST	MISC	GIN	BPIN	NUM	COM	STEM	RR	TAM	Case

SEQ: sequential ‘and then’
CAUS: ‘because’
misc: various adverbial type prefixes
BEN: benefactive applicative
gin: ‘generic’ incorporated nouns
bpin: ‘body part’ incorporated nouns
num: ‘number’ prefixes
COM: comitative applicative
RR: reflexive/reciprocal
TAM: tense/aspect mood

The diminutive enclitic =wurd is derived from noun wurd 'woman's child', its reduplication wurdurd means 'child'. wurd can attach to most word classes and functions in 3 ways of meaning: to denote small objects, to add emotional connotations and to serve as pragmatic functions (especially for interactional softening). The examples are shown below.

Bad-dulum-no=wurd kanidjah ka-h-di.
stone-hill-fill=DIM there 3SG-R-stand/be.PRS
'There is a small stone hill there.'

Wa:h ka-h-rakka-ng=wurd.
INTERJ 3SG-R-fall-PFV=DIM
'Oh, he fell over poor fellow.'

=== Syntax ===
Dalabon is a head-marking language. Dalabon has limited use of subordinate clauses, but it has a distinctive subordination strategy, which is to attach pronominal prefixes to the verb, and marked verbs are used for subordinate clause functions

Pronominal Prefixes	Subordinate1	Subordinate2
1sg	nga-	ngaye-
2sg	dja-	djaya-
3sg	ka-	kaye-
1dis	nge-	ngey-
3dis	ke-	key-
3du	barra-	barre-
3pl	bala-	bale-

subordinate1: the unmarked form of prefixes to show subordinate status, used when the status is overt by other means.

subordinate2: used when prefixes are the only way to show subordination.

dis: disharmonic, meaning odd-numbered generations.

Examples are shown below:

bala-buh-ngong+boyenj-ni-nj mahkih
3pl-because-mob+big-be-PST.PFV because
‘..because there were so many of them.’

yila-h-yang-wona-wona-n yale-yu-yu.
1pl/3-REAL-voice-REDUP-hear-PRES 1pl.SUBORD-REDUP-sleep.PRES
‘we heard his(dingo's) voice as we were sleeping.’

karrkkany ka-h-ngun kaye-do-n.
hawk.sp. 3/3l-REAL-eat.PRES 3.SUBORD-die-PRES
‘the hawk eats animals that die.’

== Vocabulary ==
Dalabon	Gloss	Dalabon	Gloss	Dalabon	Gloss
bim	"picture"	kolh-no	"liquid"	wadda	"home, house, camp"
biyi	"man(men)"	kung	"honey"	wah	"water"
bonj	"O.K."	kunj	"kangaroo"	walu-no	"the absolute law"
boyenj	"big"	labbarl	"waterhole"	wirridjih	"taboo(s)"
burrama	"good, healthy"	langu	"hand/finger"	wokan	"speak, talk, tell, name, evoke, communicate"
dabarngh	"yesterday"	mah	"also"	wol	"flame"
dengu-no	"foot/toe"	mambard	"billycan"	wurdurd	"child(children)"
djihkun	"spoon"	marrumbu	"lover	wurrhwurrungu	"the elders"
dulum	"hill"	men-no	"conscience, the thoughts of a living creature"	yabok	"sister"
kardu	"maybe"	mey	"(veget.) food"	yang	"language, speech, what one says"
kakkak-no	"grandkin"	murduk	"hard/strong"	yidjnja	"have"
kenbo	"later"	nayunghyungki	"mythical ancestors"		
kinikun	"different"	ngalyurr	"thunder"		
kirdikird	"woman(women)"	ngarrk	"ache"		
kirribruk	"true, real, honest, fair, generous"	Ngurrurdu	"emu"		
