= Gambalang =

The Gambalang are an indigenous Australian people of the Northern Territory.

== Language ==
Though many speakers now use Bininj Kunwok in their daily lives, their ancestral language Gambalang belongs to the Gunwinggic branch of the non-Pama-Nyungan Macro-Gunwinyguan languages. The language is at risk of extinction, with only 40 surviving speakers, its grammar has been described recently by Ivan Kapitonov.

== Country ==
Norman Tindale estimated their tribal territory as covering some 600 square miles (1,600 km^{2}) on the coast between Hawkesbury Point and Junction Bay. Their inland extension ran to about 25 miles (40 km) as far as Table Hill. To their east across the estuary opening into the Arafura Sea were the Gunavidji, the Gungorogone lay southeast, while the Kunwinjku were to their immediate south, on the west bank of the Liverpool River.

== Notable people ==
- Xavier Clarke, Australian rules footballer

== Alternative names ==
- Gunbalang
- Gunbulan
- Walang

== Sources ==
- Hiatt, L. R. (1965). Kinship and conflict: a study of an aboriginal community in northern Arnhem Land (PDF). Australian National University Press.
- "New Michael Long sports academy using football to improve lives and communities". indigenous.gov.au. 19 January 2016.
- Kapitonov, Ivan (2021). A Grammar of Kunbarlang. De Gruyter Mouton. ISBN 978-3-110-74124-7.
- Tindale, Norman Barnett (1974). "Gambalang (NT)". Aboriginal Tribes of Australia: Their Terrain, Environmental Controls, Distribution, Limits, and Proper Names. Australian National University. ISBN 978-0-708-10741-6. Archived from the original on 20 March 2020.
