= Australian Kriol =

Creole language developed in Australia from an English-pidgin

- Native to: Australia Northern Territory Western Australia Queensland
- Region: Roper Gulf Region, Katherine Region, Victoria-Daly Region, Kimberley Region, North Queensland, Cape York Peninsula, Torres Strait Islands
- Ethnicity: Aboriginal Australians, Torres Strait Islanders, Papuan Australians
- Native speakers: 7,500 (2021 census); L2 speakers: 10,000 (1991)
- Language family: English Creole: Pacific; Australian Kriol
- Early forms: Outback Frontier Aboriginal English: Northern Territory Pidgin English
- Dialects: Eastside Kriol (Roper River Region); Westside Kriol (Victoria River Region); West Kimberley Kriol; East Kimberley Kriol; Gajadein Kriol (Katherine Mixed Kriol); Borroloola Kriol (Borroloola and Robinson River); West Daly Kriol; Topend Kriol (Greater Darwin Region); Arnhemland Kriol; Central Desert Kriol (Centralia); Mt. Isa Kriol (North Queensland); Cape York Kriol (Cape York Peninsula); Torres Strair Kriol (Torres Strait Islands); Tiwi Kriol (Tiwi Islands); Yolngu Kriol (Yolngu People - Gove Peninsula); Groote Eylandt Kriol (Groote Eylandt Archipelago)
- Writing system: Kriol Alphabet based on the English Alphabet

Language codes
- ISO 639-3: rop
- Glottolog: krio1252
- AIATSIS: P1
- Linguasphere: 52-ABB-ca (varieties: 52-ABB-caa to -caf
- Percentage of people in each local government area (LGA) of the Kimberley and the Top End who reported speaking Kriol at home in the 2021 census. Under 5% 5-10% 10-15% 15-20% 20-25% Over 50% (Roper Gulf only)

Australian Kriol, also known as Roper River Kriol, Fitzroy Valley Kriol, Australian Creole, Northern Australian Creole or Aboriginal English, is an English-based creole language that developed from a pidgin used initially in the region of Sydney and Newcastle in New South Wales, Australia, in the early days of European colonisation. Later, it was spoken by groups further west and north.

The pidgin died out in most parts of the country, except in the Northern Territory, where the contact between European settlers, Chinese people and other Asian groups, and the Aboriginal Australians in the northern regions has maintained a vibrant use of the language, which is spoken by about 30,000 people. Despite its similarities to English in vocabulary, it has a distinct syntactic structure and grammar. It is a language in its own right and is distinct from Torres Strait Creole.

== History ==
The first records of the progenitor to Kriol, a pidgin called Port Jackson Pidgin English (PJPE), are found from the 1780s, with the pidgin being used for communication between the white settlers around Port Jackson and the local indigenous population. During that period, relations between the native Australians and Europeans were strained and often violent. Aboriginal people fiercely defended their lands. However, the control of lands was eventually seized by the settlers when a cattle company acquired much of the area. The settlers became more determined to take full control of the land from the native people and carried out a campaign to do so.

European settlement in the Northern Territory was attempted over a period of about forty years. Settlement finally succeeded in 1870 with the founding of Darwin, and an influx of English and Chinese speakers followed. To communicate between these two groups and the local Aboriginal people, many pidgins developed throughout the territory based on PJPE. By 1900, PJPE had developed into Northern Territory Pidgin English (NTPE), which was widespread and well understood.

Then, by 1908, NTPE would creolise into Australian Kriol, starting first in the Roper River Mission. One reason for this was the resettlements and land seizures that nearly annihilated the indigenous population, as they created drastic social change. Another reason was that the Anglican mission had between 70–200 people at any given times from eight different aboriginal ethnic groups who spoke different native languages. Although adult members of these groups were multilingual because of frequent meetings and ceremonies, the children communicated almost entirely in NTPE, except for close friends and family with whom they would have shared a home language. But NTPE would not have been sufficient for communication so the children naturally expanded the pidgin until it creolised into Australian Kriol. Children from these communities disseminated English features throughout their communities. Although the relations between the missionaries and Aboriginal people were friendly, the missionaries were not responsible for the development of Kriol. In fact, they tried to introduce Standard English as the official language for the mission, which the Aboriginal children used in class and with the missionaries, but Kriol still flourished.

Not all speakers of NTPE would switch over to Australian Kriol though as many after 1908 continued to speak NTPE. Kriol gradually spread and this spread was significantly sped up by policy changes made after World War 2 as well as changes caused directly by World War 2. This process of creolisation entailed a massive increase in the lexicon as well as a complexification of the grammar of the language. When NTPE speaking communities creolised not all NTPE speakers would start speaking Kriol for those in more peripheral parts of the Kriol speaking area their NTPE was heavily influenced by English so when it creolised it became a dialect of Australian Aboriginal English heavily influenced by Kriol.

Kriol was not recognised as a language until the 1970s, as it was regarded as a dialect of English.

A Kriol orthography began development in 1973, shortly after the Australian Government's announcement of an education policy using English, Kriol, and Aboriginal languages. Though a small amount of work had been done in 1967 by Mary Harris and Margaret Sharpe, their work had not been built on, and Kriol orthography has little influence from their work. From 1973 to 1975 linguists John Sandefur and Sharpe worked on the orthography with only limited involvement from native speakers of Kriol. By mid 1976 Kriol speakers from a Ngukurr school had become involved in the project, ensuring the orthography would work for both the Bamyili and Ngukurr dialects, as at the time these two dialects were the most known amongst the wider Australian establishment. By November 1976 the orthography was complete and was launched with a four-week Kriol writers' course in Bamyili and Ngukurr schools.

In her first speech in April 2013, Josie Farrer spoke in Kriol and Gija, marking the first ever use of an indigenous language in the Western Australian Parliament.

== Status ==
The Kriol language, unlike many other Aboriginal languages, remains healthy, with most of its speakers under 30 years old. About 99% of Kriol speakers are Australian Aboriginals, while only 0.8% belong to other groups, indicating that Kriol functions primarily as an in-group language. While Kriol is predominantly spoken rather than written, with generally low literacy rates among its speakers, various organisations and initiatives are working to promote Kriol literacy and media presence through education, original content creation and translations of existing works.

Views on the Kriol language vary widely. Some dispute its status as a distinct language, dismissing it as either English or poorly spoken English. Others see it as a threat to traditional Aboriginal languages, while many embrace and actively support it. Government support remains limited, with only two bilingual programs ever established; those being in Barunga and Ngukurr. Although the Barunga program has since closed, both programs successfully incorporated Kriol as both a teaching medium and a subject of study.

Code switching between Kriol and English, as well as between Light and Heavy Kriol, is common practice. Light Kriol and English are typically used in formal settings, while Heavy Kriol is preferred among Aboriginal people and in casual situations, similar to how speakers switch between formal and informal English.

=== Decreolisation ===
In areas bordering Kriol-speaking regions, a process of decreolisation has occurred, with speakers shifting toward Australian Aboriginal English while retaining some Kriol features. This trend is most noticeable among mixed-race Aboriginal Australians living in larger towns with significant European populations. Historically, widespread discrimination led many to suppress their Aboriginal heritage and view Kriol as incorrect English that needed to be eliminated. These factors, combined with constant exposure to English, led to a gradual language shift. While racism has diminished, continued contact with English means that in some communities, although the Aboriginal population can speak Kriol, Aboriginal English remains the primary language for interaction with European-descent Australians and others.

Another form of decreolisation occurs when early Kriol speakers relocate to areas where Kriol is not used. Without regular exposure to Kriol and surrounded by English speakers, their language would shift toward English.

However, the extent of decreolisation poses no significant threat to Kriol. With a high birthrate among Kriol speakers and decreolisation affecting only a small minority in approximately 6 out of 250 Kriol-speaking communities, the language maintains its vitality.

== Dialects ==
=== Post-creole continuum ===
Kriol exists along a post-creole continuum, with dialects ranging from those closer to Australian Aboriginal English to those more distinct from it. Heavy Kriol, which differs more substantially from English, incorporates more words from Australian Aboriginal languages and features more divergent word order and phonology. Light Kriol, on the other hand, maintains more English-like characteristics, including English suffixes, similar phonology and a higher proportion of English vocabulary. Between these two extremes lies a spectrum of mesolects, representing varying degrees of difference from standard English.

Heavy Kriol	Light Kriol	English
gabarra	hed	head
gula	graul	growl/tell off
dirwu	daib	dive
hojij	hosis	horses

The choice between Light and Heavy Kriol often reflects speakers' level of integration into mainstream Anglo-Australian society. Indigenous Australians who are more integrated into broader society typically use Light Kriol, while those who maintain stronger traditional ties and often speak an Indigenous Australian language as their first language tend to use Heavy Kriol.

Mutual intelligibility between Kriol and English is limited, though it varies depending on the dialect. While Light Kriol is more comprehensible to English speakers than Heavy Kriol, even then understanding is superficial. English speakers may grasp the general meaning of Kriol speech but struggle to understand specific details.

=== Geographic dialects ===
Aside from this acrolectic spectrum, Australian Kriol encompasses several geographic dialects, organised in a hierarchy of regional and local variations. Major regional dialects are centred around Roper River, Barunga, Fitzroy Valley, Halls Creek, Daly River, Belyuen, Turkey Creek-Wyndham-Kununurra area and the Barkly Tableland, with possible distinct dialects around the Victoria River. Each regional dialect further subdivides into local dialects, typically associated with individual settlements, though these smaller variations remain largely unstudied.

These dialects differ in their phonology, grammar and lexicon. A general pattern emerges: dialects in more populated, accessible areas tend toward Light Kriol, showing stronger English influence, while those in more isolated, less populated regions typically align with Heavy Kriol. Each dialect community usually descends from speakers of a particular Indigenous language, leading to the incorporation of vocabulary from that language. While speakers of other dialects can understand these distinct vocabulary items, they typically do not use them themselves.

Among these geographic variations, the dialects of the Roper River and Barunga regions have received the most thorough documentation and study.

=== Sociolects ===
Australian Kriol also exhibits social dialects or sociolects. One notable variety is strit tok (street talk), a youth slang often criticised by traditional speakers as a corruption of "proper" Kriol. Another variant is Borunga Kriol, spoken by non-native Kriol speakers attempting to communicate with Kriol speakers. Borunga Kriol speakers fall into two groups: language learners who produce an "English-Kriol interlanguage" while acquiring the language, and those who intentionally speak a simplified, incorrect version of English in an attempt to mimic Kriol. This latter form, known as "Mock Kriol", bears little resemblance to authentic Kriol and represents an inaccurate imitation of the language.

=== Creolisation ===
Two distinct creole languages have also emerged from contact between Kriol and other Aboriginal languages. Gurndji Creole developed in the Victoria River District through extensive code-switching between Kriol and Gurindji. Similarly, Light Warlpiri emerged in the town of Lajamanu through rapid code-switching between Kriol, English and Warlpiri.

== Phonology ==
Consonants (Note: Some are exclusive to certain dialects)
		Bilabial	Labiodental	Interdental	Alveolar	Retroflex	Palatal	Labiovelar	Velar	Glottal
Plosive	Voiced	b		t̪	d	ɖ	c		g	
Plosive	Voiceless	p			t	ʈ			k	
Fricative			f		s		ʃ			h
Nasal		m			n	ɳ	ɲ		ŋ	
Lateral					l	ɭ	ʎ			
Trill/Tap					r					
Approximant						ɻ	j	w		

Vowels
	Front	Central	Back
Close	i ɪ		u
Mid	ɛ	ə	o
Open	æ	a ä	ɔ

Austral Kriol also has 7 diphthongs.

Australian Kriol is influenced by the phonologies of various Indigenous Australian languages, resulting in individual phonological variation based on the Indigenous languages of its speakers.

=== Phonotactics ===
Australian Kriol phonotactics dictates that consonant clusters at the start of words must be a plosive followed by a liquid, rhotic or glide consonant, the only exception is an alveolar fricative followed by a plosive. Consonant clusters at the end of words are nonexistent except for the clusters /lb/ and /ks/.

== Orthography ==
The Kriol alphabet is based on the English alphabet, but varies not only in what letters and digraphs are used, but also in the rules for said letters and digraphs. Each phoneme in Kriol can only be spelled one way, unlike in English orthography, where several different spellings can be used to make the same sound. Kriol, unlike English, also uses a phonetic orthography in which words are spelled to match how they sound.

The Kriol alphabet contains 21 letters, 11 consonant digraphs, 5 vowel digraphs and 5 punctuation marks.

Letters: A, B, D, E, F, G, H, I, J, K, L, M, N, O, Q, R, S, T, U, W, Y

Consonant Digraphs: Ly, Ng, Ny, Rd, Rl, Rn, Rr, Rt, Sh, Th, Tj

Vowel Digraphs: Ai, Au, Ei, Oi, Ou

Punctuation Marks: Period (.), Comma (,), Question mark (?), Exclamation mark (!), Quotation marks (" ")

== Morphology and syntax ==
As a general rule, the grammar of Kriol is a simplified version of that found in English, meaning that it is analytic, with words generally having only one form and additional meaning derived not from changing words but from word order and added new words.

=== Parts of speech ===
The parts of speech which Australian Kriol has are: verbs, modals, tense markers, adverbs, nouns, pronouns, adjectives, demonstratives, quantifiers, articles, plural markers, prepositions, and particles.

=== Pronouns ===
Kriol pronouns differentiate between different between first, second and third person, as well as between singular, plural, and dual plural inclusive and exclusive pronouns first person. The language also differentiates between subject, object, independent pronoun, and adnominal possessive. There are also reflexive and reciprocal pronouns.

Pronouns of Australian Kriol
			Subject	Object	Independent pronoun	Adnominal Possessive
1st Person	Singular		ai, mi	mi	mi	main, mi, mai
1st Person	Dual	Inclusive	yunmi, minyu, wi	yunmi	yunmi	yunmi
1st Person	Dual	Exclusive	min(du)bala, wi	min(du)bala, as	min(du)bala	min(du)bala
1st Person	Plural	Inclusive	minolabat, wilat, wi	as, minolabat	as, minolabat	as, minolabat
1st Person	Plural	Exclusive	mibala, wi, mela(bat)	mibala, as, mela(bat)	mibala, mela(bat)	mibala, mela(bat)
2nd Person	Singular		yu	yu	yu	yu, yus
2nd Person	Dual		yundubala	yundubala	yundubala	yundubala
2nd Person	Plural		yubala, yumob	yubala, yumob	yubala, yumob	yubala, yumob
3rd Person	Singular		im ~ i ~ hi	im	im	im, is
3rd Person	Dual		dubala	dubala	dubala	dubala
3rd Person	Plural		olabat, ol, dei	olabat, ol, dei	olabat, ol, dei	olabat, ol, dei
Reflexive				mijelp, jelp		
Reciprocal				gija, mijelp, jelp		

=== Demonstratives ===
		Pronomial	Adnomial	Adverbial Locative	Adverbial Directional
Proximal	Singular	dijan ~ diswan	dij ~ dis	hiya	dijei
Proximal	Plural	dislot ~ dislat	dislot ~ dislat		
Distal	Singular	tharran ~ jarran ~ jadan	that ~ jet ~ det	theya ~ jeya ~ deya	tharrei
Distal	Plural	thatlot ~ jatlot ~ jatlat	thatlot ~ jatlot ~ jatlat		

=== Suffixes ===
Various types of words in Kriol have one or more suffixes associated with them with certain suffixes being used for several different types of words.

Types of non spatial suffixes
	Suffix	Example	English
Adjective	-wan	nogudwan	bad
Adjective	-bala	granggibala	crazy
Progressive Verbs	-bat	lukinatbat	Watching
Quantifier	-bala	sambala	some
Transitive verbs	-im	Irim mi na	listen to me

In Australian Kriol, many spatial words from English have been transformed into suffixes attached to verbs they interact with. The specific suffixes vary between dialects but remain mostly similar.

Spacial suffixes
Kriol suffix	translation	example	translation
an	on	putiman	put on
ap	up	klaimap	climb up
(a)ran	around	lukaran	look around
(a)wei	away	ranawei	run away
at	out, at	kamat	come out
bek	back	ranbek	run back
dan	down/over	nakimdan	knock over
oba/ova	over	guwoba	go over
of/op/ap	off	gidof	get off

These spacial suffixes and the non spacial suffixes can be combined in words like pikimap (pick up) which contains the suffixes im and ap.

=== Word order ===
Kriol uses an SVO word order exclusively. In Kriol the order of possessor and possessum varies, with it being evenly split between possessor possessum and possessum possessor.

	Kriol	English
Possessor Possessum	blanga olgamen daga	the woman's food
Possessum Posessor	mani blanga mi	money of mine

In Kriol word order is evenly split between verb object adverb and Adverb verb object. Word order is used over inflections or subject object affixation or verbs to specify meaning.

=== Reduplication ===
In Kriol, reduplication can be used both on the root of a verb and on the entire verb to make the verb a progressive verb.

Word being reduplicated	English	Word when reduplicated	English
Gobek	Return	Gobekgobek	Returning
Rid	Read	Ridridbat	Reading

== Lexicon ==
The primary contributing language of Kriol is English, but it has received and continues to receive influence from Chinese Pidgin English, Alawa, Marra, Ngalakgan, Wandarrang, Mangarrayi, Ngandi, Nunggubuyu, Jawoyn, Dalabon, Rembarrnga, Barunga, Jaminjung, Ngarinyman, Wardaman, Walmatjari, Djaru, Miriwoong and Gija.

There are a significant number of loanwords from Australian Aboriginal languages in Australian Kriol. These words most frequently come from semantic domains which were of particular significance to Aboriginal Australians such as kinship, ceremony and nature or were primarily discussed among the family and language group such as familial terms. Examples of these include the words lambarra (father in law), corroboree (sacred dance) and jaojao (water lily stalk).

New words have often been coined to fill lexical gaps instead of borrowing from Aboriginal languages. For example the Kriol word mailawik comes from the English word week and the Aboriginal morpheme maila (poor), and thus literally means "poor week". It was used to refer to the week in the fortnightly payment system in which the employee would not be paid, which is referred to "off pay week" in Australian English.

Words were also sometimes semantically changed or expanded to fill new meanings.

Semantic Expansion in Kriol
Original Term	Kriol term	Added definition
Sugar Bag	jugabeg	Wild Honey
Wire	Waya	Three pronged fishing spear made of fencing wire
find	baindim	conceive

== Media ==
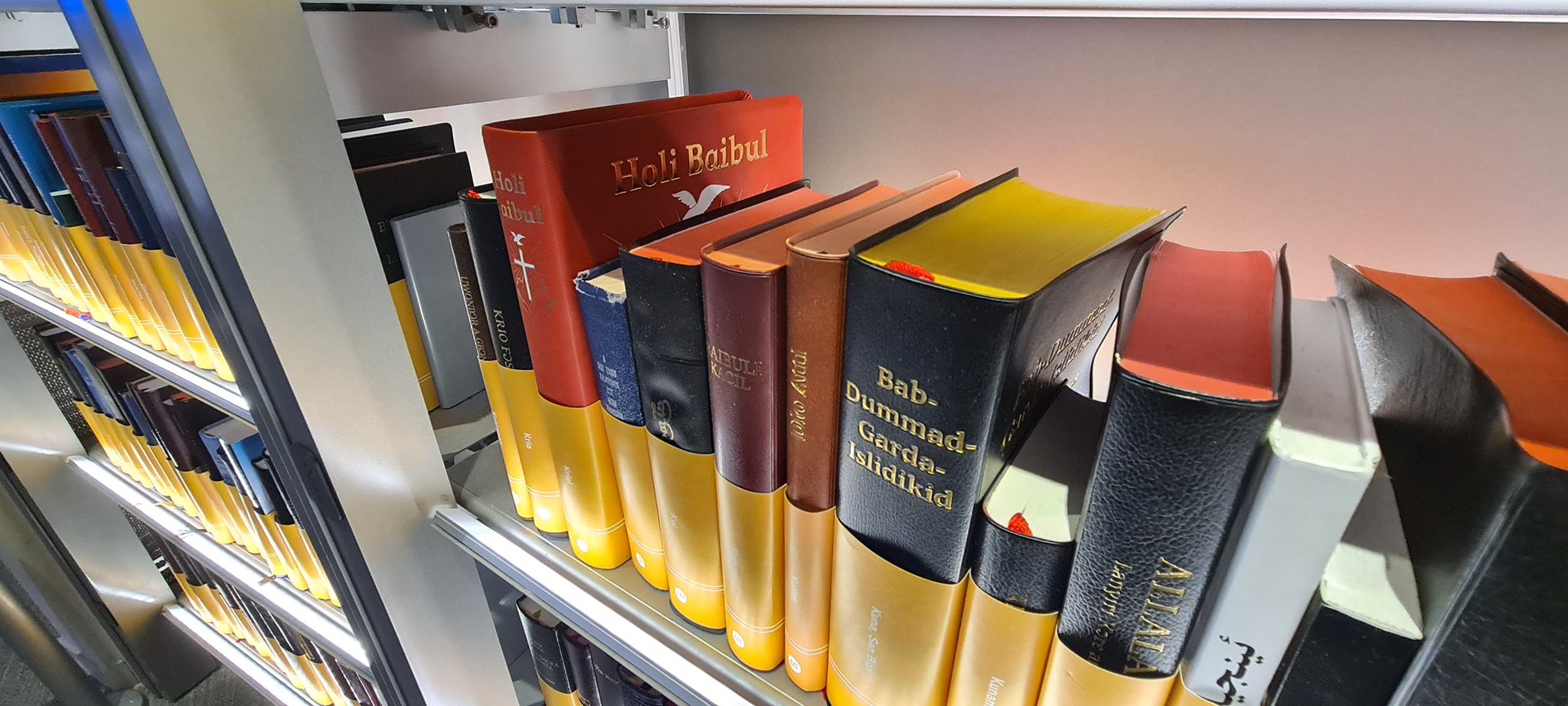
Located at the Museum of the Bible, a copy of the Australian Kriol Bible (Holi Baibul) is on display.

Many famous pieces of media such Shakespeare and Waltzing Matilda have been translated into Kriol, and many books have been published in Kriol. ABC and several other organizations currently make news in Kriol. Online there are several videos and texts available in Kriol, as well as resources for learning the language. There is also an Australian Kriol Wikipedia currently on the Wikimedia Incubator.

=== Bible translation ===
On 5 May 2007, the first complete edition of the Bible in the Kriol language was launched at Katherine in the Northern Territory. Translation took over 29 years. It was undertaken by a team of native Kriol speakers led by Rev. Canon Gumbuli Wurrumara and specialists from the Society for Australian Indigenous Languages.

The Kriol Bible is the first complete edition of the Bible in any Indigenous Australian language. The publication was a joint venture of The Bible Society, Lutheran Bible Translators, The Church Missionary Society, the Anglican church, Wycliffe Bible Translators, and the Australian Society of Indigenous Languages.

== Sample text ==
Kriol	English
[Genesis 1:1–2] Orait, longtaim wen God bin stat meigimbat ebrijing, nomo enijing bin jidan. Imbin jis eniwei, nomo garram enijing. Oni strongbala woda bin goran goran ebriwei, en imbin brabli dakbala, en det Spirit blanga God bin mubabat ontop langa det woda.	[Genesis 1:1–2] In the beginning God created the heavens and the earth. Now the earth was formless and empty, darkness was over the surface of the deep, and the Spirit of God was hovering over the waters.
Wen ola bigini dun Kriol la skul, im album alabat jidan strongbala. La run 33 alabat bin dum profail, bla dalim wi "hu yu?". La Rum 12, alabat bin drodrobat alabat femili en raidimdan wani dei gulum alabat gada Kriol	Our Kriol programs help students feel strong about themselves. In Room 33, students have been completing Kriol profiles about themselves while in Room 12, students did some great family portraits with all the labels in Kriol.

== Sentence example text ==
Simple sentences
Australian Kriol	English
1) Bat thad nyu-wan Wulis im gud-wan du, ngabi? 2) Im [la the natha beg.] 3) Wi garra jidan la woda olagija.	1. “But the new Woolies is good too, isn’t it?”; 2. “It’s in the other bag.”; 3. “We may have to live in the water forever.”

Complex sentences
Australian Kriol	English
1) Tubala kam-in hiya [we im=in hab-im bubala marrug]. 2) Wal jad lilboi im=in reken [frog bin lik-im-bat feis en pul-um-bat heya] 3) Yu wandi girr-im jat faiya bla mibala bikos mibala wand-im bla gug-um-bat taga.	1. “The two are coming here, the ones that he (a white man) had kept hidden way.”; 2. “Well the little boy thought that the frog was licking his face and pulling his hair.”; 3. “You should get that fire for us, because we want it to cook our food with.”
