= Kundedjnjenghmi dialect =

Australian Aboriginal language

Kundedjnjenghmi
- Native to: Australia
- Region: Northern Territory
- Ethnicity: Bininj
- Language family: Arnhem: Gunwinyguan; Gunwinggic; Bininj Kunwok; Kundedjnjenghmi

Language codes
- ISO 639-3: –
- Glottolog: kund1258
- AIATSIS: n171 Kundedjnjenghmi

Kundedjnjenghmi is a dialect of Bininj Kunwok, an Australian Aboriginal language. The Kundedjnjenghmi dialect is native to the high 'stone country' of the Arnhem Plateau, including the communities of Kabulwarnamyo and Kamarrkawarn. Younger speakers in this area have largely switched to other varieties of Bininj Kunwok, although they retain a passive knowledge of Kundedjnjenghmi. A number of songs by the Nabarlek band use the Kundedjnjenghmi dialect, as do traditional 'Kunborrk' songs.
