= Golden tree =

Golden tree may refer to:

- Sonagachi, also known as Golden Tree, the largest red-light district of Kolkata
- Grevillea pteridifolia, also known as golden tree, a plant species from Australia
