= Waray language (disambiguation) =

Waray language is a language of the Philippines, native to Eastern Visayas.

Waray language may also refer to:

- Warray language, an Australian language spoken in the Adelaide River area of the Northern Territory
- Waray Sorsogon language or Southern Sorsogon language, a language spoken in Sorsogon province in the Philippines
