= Macro-Gunwinyguan languages =

Australian Aboriginal languages

Macro-Gunwinyguan
- Arnhem
- Geographic distribution: northern Australia
- Linguistic classification: Macro-Pama–Nyungan?: Macro-Gunwinyguan
- Subdivisions: Maningrida; Gunwinyguan; East Arnhem; Marran; Alawa; Mangarrayi; Kungarakany (†); Gagudju †; ?Tiwi

Language codes
- Glottolog: gunw1250 Gunwinyguan mani1293 Maningrida mang1423 Mangarrayi-Maran kung1259 Kungarakany gaga1251 Gaagudju
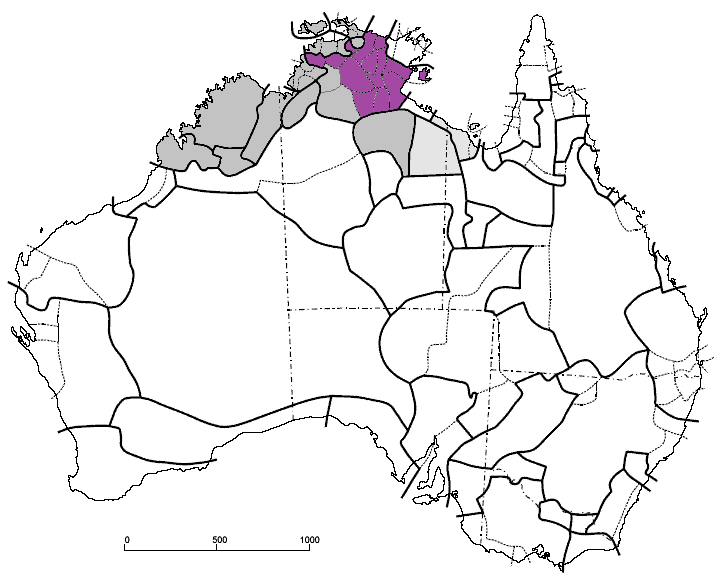
- The Arnhem languages (purple), and other non-Pama–Nyungan languages (grey). Below (closeup): the individual families.

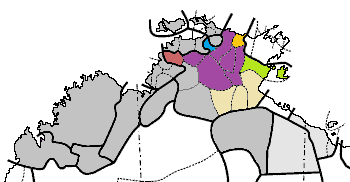
Kungarakany
Gaagudju
Maningrida
Gunwinyguan
East Arnhem
Marran

The Macro-Gunwinyguan languages, also called Arnhem or Gunwinyguan, are a family of Australian Aboriginal languages spoken across eastern Arnhem Land in northern Australia. Their relationship has been demonstrated through shared morphology in their verbal inflections.

Many of the languages have a fortis–lenis contrast in plosive consonants. Lenis/short plosives have weak contact and intermittent voicing, while fortis/long plosives have full closure, a more powerful release burst, and no voicing.

== Languages ==
Rebecca Green (2004) reconstructed the paradigms of 28 Proto-Arnhem verbs. The languages included by Green are as follows, though Green only accepts Maningrida as a demonstrated branch:

- Macro-Gunwinyguan
  - Maningrida
    - Burarra
    - Guragone
    - Djeebbana
    - Nakkara
  - ? East Arnhem:
    - Nunggubuyu
    - Ngandi †
    - Anindilyakwa (Enindhilyagwa)*
  - ? Marran:
    - Marra
    - Warndarang †
    - ?Yugul †
    - ?Alawa*
    - ?Mangarayi †
  - Kungarakany †
  - Gaagudju †
  - ? Gunwinyguan (Gunwinyguan proper)
    - Gunwinggic:
      - Kunwinjku (Gunwinggu, Bininj Kunwok)
      - Gunbarlang †
    - Jawoyn (Djauan)
    - Dalabon (Ngalkbun) †
    - Jala (Rembarngic):
      - Rembarunga
      - Ngalakgan †
    - Warrayic: †
      - Waray †
      - Uwinymil †

*Green does not address Anindilyakwa, Alawa, or Yugul. Yugul is too poorly attested for comparison based on her methods; the other two await validation.

This is close to what Evans (1997) proposed under the name Gunwinyguan (cf. his very different proposal of Arnhem Land languages).

Marra, Warndarrang, Alawa, and Mangarrayi have been argued to constitute a Marran family of considerable time depth (Sharpe 2008).

Heath (1990) demonstrated an East Arnhem family of Ngandi + Nunggubuyu, to which Enindhilyagwa was added (as a closer relative to Nunggubuyu) by Van Egmond (2012).

However, Green (2003) argues that only Maningrida has been established as a valid subgroup, and that the interrelationships of the other languages are as yet unclear. The evidence for Gunwinyguan and perhaps other nodes listed above may simply be reflections of a relationship of all Arnhem languages when only a subset of them was investigated. That is, these groups may be based on shared retentions of Proto-Arnhem rather than distinct historical developments. (However, in reviewing Green, Evans pointed out that much of the Maningrida morphology was also shared by Mangarrayi.) An agnostic view of the family would list each language separately, except for the established Maningrida branch:

Kungarakany, Mangarrayi, Marra, Maningrida, Ngalakgan, Bininj Kunwok (Gunwinggu), Warndarrang, Uwinymil, Gaagudju, Dalabon, Kunbarlang, Rembarrnga, Nunggubuyu, Jawoyn, Warray, Ngandi

Yangmanic, including Wardaman, had once been included in Gunwinyguan, but has been removed from recent classifications.

== External classification ==
Evans (1997) proposes that these languages are related to Pama–Nyungan in a family he calls Macro-Pama–Nyungan, but this has not yet been demonstrated.

In 2003, he proposed that they are also related to the Eastern Daly languages.

== Vocabulary ==
Capell (1940) lists the following basic vocabulary items for the Gunwinyguan languages:

| gloss | Gunwinggu | Gunbarlang |
|---|---|---|
| man | biniṉ | giɖimarg |
| woman | muli‘muliŋ | baramimbaṉ |
| head | gungɔidj | gɔidjgɔidj |
| eye | gunmin | wumu |
| nose | gungɛb | wumɛːli |
| mouth | gundaŋ | djaːɖɛɽ |
| tongue | gundjɛn | ŋaːg |
| stomach | gunjan | mugmaɳɖi |
| bone | gunmuruŋ | gɛːgɛg |
| blood | gungulba | moɭobin |
| kangaroo | gɔɳɔbɔlɔ | goːin |
| opossum | djɛːbui | gundärbu |
| emu | gurugaiju | maɳɖɛb |
| crow | waːg | djidaːwun |
| fly | bɔːd | mog |
| sun | gunduŋ | gaːnag |
| moon | diːd | wurana |
| fire | gunɽag | wiɖidj |
| smoke | gundɔlŋ | wungawu |
| water | gunɽɔin | njunjug |

Capell (1942) lists the following additional basic vocabulary items for the Gunwinyguan languages:

| gloss | Southern Gunwinggu | Muralidban | Andiljaugwa | Nunggubuyu | Wandarang | Ngandi | Rainbarngo | Buan | Gundangbon |
|---|---|---|---|---|---|---|---|---|---|
| man | binin | binin | nanamamalja | nawarinjuŋ | nawaɽiji | nijul | biː | jawurin | biji |
| woman | dalug | ŋalwareːrulg | wudáriŋga | ŋaramaninjuŋ | ŋiwoibi | namanaŋ | diŋ‘ | giɖigiɖ | girigidj |
| head | gungoidj | gungoidan | ariŋga | jinag | wugululu | gulaŋ | djara | gɔidj | gɔidj |
| eye | gunmiːm | gunmiːm | meːnba | bagaɭa | mamaguɽ | maŋandjula | gaindjulja | mïmï | mumu |
| nose | gungəb | gungəb | aminda | jɔmɔːr | wundjíriba | gwijiban | giːja | djɛː | djɛː |
| mouth | gundaŋ | gundaŋ | adira | ɽamadan | wuŋaːndal | gudagula | diːjälŋ | daːləː | dalugaɽa‘ |
| tongue | gundjen | gundjen | aljäljigba | laːn | wudjijil | gudälŋ | diːjälŋ | dɛl | djɛn |
| stomach | gunjam | gunmelem | mulgwa | ŋuɖan | wuŋandja | mowara | giːna | guː | ŋu‘ |
| bone | gunmuruŋ | gunmuruŋ | adidira | ŋagaɽa | wuŋaɽaga | guŋaɽaga | balmana | mɔː | mɔː |
| blood | gungulba | gungulba | meːra | wulaŋ | maŋulidji | mabaɳgo | gulbana | guraidj | gulba |
| kangaroo | goɳobolo | gundagi | juburáda | ŋargọ | mulbia | mulbia | bulaidj-bulaidj | guiṉ | guiṉ |
| opossum | djɛːbui | duri | juguŋba | jirgi | ajirgin | aɖawa | marŋo | dugula | dugula |
| emu | gurugaiju | | | wajin | ŋiwurugan | awurban | | ŋuroɖo | ŋuroɖo |
| crow | waːg | waːg | jiŋwa | wɔːwag | waɽgwaɽg | awa‘wa | wa‘wa‘ | wa‘wa‘ | wa‘wa‘ |
| fly | bɔːd | bɔːd | juwama | amun | awamun | abɔd | buad | mɔɽ | bɔːd |
| sun | gunduŋ | ŋalbɛnbe | mamaːwura | aɭir | ŋinguŋaru | mawaɭir | muda | walir | bɛbagar |
| moon | diːɖ | diːɖ | jimaːwura | labama | nadaŋadaŋa | nigurŋa | gurŋa | diɖ | gurŋa |
| fire | gunag | gunag | aŋuɽa | ŋuɽa | wuŋambur | gudaŋi | ŋuɽa | mimäl | mimäl |
| smoke | gundɔlŋ | gundɔlŋ | aŋwara | wuŋuban | wundular | gubán | dɔːɭŋ | dɔlgnɔ | djunör |
| water | gogo | gunɽɔːṉ | aguŋwa | agogo | wuŋaladja | gujärg | djula | waː | waː |

| gloss | Mara |
|---|---|
| man | gärijimar |
| woman | girija |
| head | maraŋuɽu |
| eye | maguɽ |
| nose | djiɽi |
| mouth | ŋaːndal |
| tongue | djiːjil |
| stomach | gunjan |
| bone | ŋajigad |
| blood | ŋulidji |
| kangaroo | girmọ |
| opossum | gudjaɳi |
| emu | djiwiɖiwiɖi |
| crow | waŋganaŋi |
| fly | guɳɖil |
| sun | gunaru |
| moon | waɖaŋari |
| fire | waɖgar |
| smoke | guŋoŋo |
| water | ŋọgọ |

== Proto-language ==
Proto-Gunwinyguan
- Reconstruction of: Gunwinyguan languages

Below are some reconstructed Proto-Gunwinyguan (i.e., Proto-Gunwinyguan proper) animal and plant names from Harvey (2003):

Proto-Gunwinyguan animal names
| no. | gloss | Proto-Gunwinyguan |
|---|---|---|
| 8 | gudgeon sp. | *cakorlk |
| 10 | centipede | *calarr |
| 18 | death adder | *campVn/rn |
| 26 | frill-necked lizard | *cangkurr |
| 31 | quoll | *cappo |
| 32 | long-horned grasshopper | *cappurtenyqrteny |
| 35 | crayfish | *carla |
| 38 | jabiru | *carnarran |
| 39 | whimbrel | *carnpalcarnpal |
| 42 | water goanna | *carrkka |
| 44 | female agile wallaby | *carrurtrtu |
| 49 | green tree frog | *catngerecngerec |
| 53 | koel | *cawok |
| 70 | rifle fish | *cetperte |
| 77 | willy wagtail | *cikirricikirric |
| 80 | whistleduck | *cilikuypi |
| 96 | quail | *cirrirnrti(t) |
| 102 | bony bream | *cirrpili |
| 103 | whistleduck | *cirrpiyuk |
| 105 | scorpion | *co(wo)c |
| 107 | hornet | *cokparl |
| 108 | carpet snake | *cokpiny |
| 121 | nail-tailed wallaby | *cotet |
| 127 | water goanna | *cucca |
| 128 | female black wallaby | *cukerre |
| 138 | bowerbird | *curerrk |
| 139 | kingfisher sp. | *curk |
| 142 | black-headed python | *curn |
| 143 | rock wallaby | *curnrtupolq |
| 145 | taipan | *currang |
| 148 | tawny frogmouth, owl sp. | *currul |
| 152 | kangaroo rat | *Cakot |
| 154 | fishtail palm | *Calmarr |
| 173 | tawny frogmouth | *Cawarl |
| 178 | willy wagtail | *Ciningkirric |
| 215 | jabiru | *kanci |
| 230 | bony bream | *karlarlppa |
| 232 | Long Tom fish | *karlerrq |
| 237 | black cockatoo | *karnamarr |
| 238 | black flying fox | *karnampal |
| 239 | emu, large feathers on emu | *karnanganyca |
| 241 | big bandicoot | *karnma |
| 249 | dingo | *karnrteken |
| 253 | black cockatoo | *karrak |
| 255 | spoonbill | *karral/rla |
| 264 | goshawk | *karrkkany |
| 275 | dingo | *kawirVq |
| 276 | nankeen night heron | *kawk |
| 277 | friarbird | *kaworlk |
| 336 | kookaburra | *korrowkkorrow |
| 344 | echidna | *kowarrang |
| 347 | freshwater crocodile | *koyow |
| 353 | emu | *kulppiny |
| 359 | tawny frogmouth | *kuluyqkuluy |
| 364 | blue-tongue lizard | *kungar(l)ak |
| 369 | black-headed python | *kunungu |
| 374 | paperbark sp. | *kurlkurl |
| 378 | ibis sp. | *kurnrtirnrtirn |
| 384 | blue-tongue lizard | *kurri |
| 385 | blue-tongue lizard | *kurrmul/rlu |
| 388 | olive python | *kurrucartu |
| 405 | saltwater crocodile | *kVngV |
| 408 | kookaburra | *kVrVwVk |
| 417 | sugar glider | *Lampalk |
| 433 | spotted bream | *Leppal |
| 442 | black cockatoo | *Lirrapin |
| 448 | butcherbird | *Lopolopo |
| 464 | black-headed python | *maccurn |
| 467 | pelican | *makkakkurr |
| 485 | echidna | *manappurn |
| 495 | centipede | *marla |
| 511 | water goanna | *marrampal |
| 523 | friarbird | *martawk |
| 528 | barramundi | *martpiny |
| 530 | barramundi | *martukkal |
| 561 | blue-tongue lizard | *milqtarl |
| 570 | barramundi | *mirricci |
| 586 | blue-tongue lizard | *morlel |
| 598 | rainbow serpent | *muc |
| 617 | spoonbill | *muqmu |
| 625 | flying fox | *murru |
| 637 | frogmouth | *Na-cik |
| 639 | barramundi | *Namarnkorl |
| 644 | black flying fox | *Nangamung |
| 645 | saltwater crocodile | *Nangkurru |
| 664 | grey-crowned babbler | *ngakngak |
| 667 | white corella | *ngalelek |
| 684 | white cockatoo | *ngarrac |
| 685 | saratoga | *ngarrayarl |
| 687 | short-necked turtle | *ngart |
| 690 | rifle fish | *ngatpan |
| 702 | white cockatoo | *ngerrk |
| 756 | tree rat; quoll | *pakkaci |
| 801 | spotted nightjar | *parnangka |
| 807 | kookaburra | *parraca |
| 808 | darter (bird sp.) | *parrakparrak |
| 812 | black wallaroo | *parrk |
| 820 | march fly | *partrti |
| 824 | pelican | *paya |
| 827 | file snake | *pekka |
| 831 | gecko spp. | *pelerrk |
| 839 | bustard | *penuk |
| 845 | plover | *perrepperrep |
| 846 | rainbow bee-eater | *perrertperrert |
| 847 | masked plover | *pettelerrelerre |
| 850 | file snake | *piccirri |
| 856 | galah | *pilkpilk |
| 866 | barramundi | *pirlmu |
| 873 | glossy ibis | *pirnrtu |
| 887 | archer fish | *poccalk |
| 904 | water python | *porlokko |
| 906 | brolga | *pornorrong |
| 915 | velvet-tailed gecko | *poywek |
| 923 | pheasant | *pukpuk |
| 932 | ghost bat | *pumapuma |
| 934 | file snake | *punupun |
| 941 | water goanna | *purarr |
| 954 | water python | *purrurtci |
| 963 | red-eyed pigeon | *rakul |
| 976 | Torresian imperial pigeon | *rumuq |
| 981 | sand goanna | *Talak |
| 997 | black cockatoo | *Tarrapiya |
| 1009 | plover | *Tetterran |
| 1012 | dollar bird | *Tewtew |
| 1020 | peewee | *Tirlkrtirlk |
| 1024 | moon; moon snake | *Tirt |
| 1025 | wedge-tailed eagle | *Tiwana |
| 1034 | rock wallaby | *Torriya |
| 1045 | ring-tailed possum | *Tukula |
| 1049 | bony bream | *Tulukkurr |
| 1067 | green tree frog | *thakparrarraq |
| 1093 | Long Tom fish | *thumpi |
| 1097 | bandicoot | *thungkaq |
| 1100 | king brown snake | *T(h)atpe |
| 1115 | crow | *wakwak |
| 1123 | bustard | *walppurrungku |
| 1171 | butcherbird | *warrkcirt |
| 1196 | rainbow fish | *werec |
| 1206 | possum | *wirik |
| 1216 | bird sp.; rainbow bee-eater; kingfisher; whipbirds | *wirritwirrit |
| 1217 | black-faced cuckooshrike | *wirriwirriyak |
| 1231 | cockroach | *wor(o)cwor(o)c |
| 1244 | possum sp. | *wumpu |
| 1274 | yabby | *yarr |
| 1291 | bird sp.; mopoke; kite | *yerr/riny |
| 1303 | water rat | *yirrkkup |
| 1314 | lightning; rain; Leichhardt's grasshopper [seen in wet season] | *yurr |

Proto-Gunwinyguan plant names
| no. | gloss | Proto-Gunwinyguan |
|---|---|---|
| 2 | Grevillea pteridifolia | *caca ~ *yacca |
| 12 | spinifex | *calng |
| 30 | wattle sp. | *capec |
| 36 | king brown snake | *carlung |
| 40 | banyan | *carnqpa |
| 54 | water lily stem | *cawqcaw |
| 60 | Grevillea sp. | *cenkererr |
| 63 | milkwood | *cenycok |
| 67 | pandanus mat | *cerrpe |
| 82 | Capparis umbonata | *ciliwirn |
| 85 | Pandanus aquaticus | *cimcim |
| 93 | mistletoe | *cirnirrin/ny |
| 141 | lancewood | *curluq |
| 223 | ironwood | *kappay |
| 235 | freshwater mangrove | *karlngka/iny |
| 236 | wattle sp., woomera type | *karlppu |
| 244 | Acacia sp. | *karnpirr |
| 258 | spinifex sp. | *karrarnrtalk |
| 278 | tree sp., Gardenia megasperma, Capparis umbonata | *kayapam |
| 321 | plant sp., bush potato | *kongkong |
| 329 | Planchonia careya | *korlq |
| 334 | pandanus husk | *korrmo |
| 341 | paperbark | *kot |
| 345 | paperbark humpy, bark of stringybark | *kowk |
| 377 | black plum | *kurnrtalq |
| 379 | Flacourtia territorialis | *kurnrtun/rn |
| 398 | Terminalia grandiflora | *kutt/rtrtu |
| 402 | Banksia dentata | *kuypuk |
| 431 | Opilia amentacea | *Leklek |
| 461 | wild passionfruit | *ma(rt)rtawk |
| 482 | Canthium lucidum | *mamtak |
| 513 | palm sp., Cycas media | *marrappi |
| 527 | eucalyptus sp. | *martpa |
| 529 | paperbark, deep coolamon | *martu |
| 576 | nut of pandanus | *moc |
| 599 | coolibah | *muccu |
| 602 | paperbark sp. | *mul/rlmu |
| 604 | conkerberry | *mululuk |
| 607 | ironwood | *mulyurruny |
| 627 | black currant | *murrungkurn |
| 677 | eucalyptus sp. | *ngapak |
| 689 | cycad | *ngaththu |
| 704 | black currant | *ngik |
| 708 | pandanus sp. | *ngokngo |
| 711 | river red gum | *ngolongkoq |
| 776 | Ficus opposita | *pampul/rla |
| 802 | Owenia vernicosa | *parnarr |
| 825 | green plum | *pe/irrke/iq |
| 826 | quinine tree | *pecca |
| 843 | eucalyptus sp. | *pernpern |
| 865 | Acacia holosericea | *pirliwirli |
| 880 | tea tree | *pirtippirti |
| 896 | Dalabon | *pon |
| 898 | wattle sp. | *pongka |
| 925 | paperbark sp. | *pul(p)pul |
| 935 | clump of bamboo; Bambusa arnhemica | *-puny |
| 953 | Cassytha filiformis | *purrurnpurrurn |
| 955 | Xanthostemon paradoxus | *purt/lu |
| 958 | tree sp. - Brachychiton diversifolium | *putput |
| 962 | paperbark | *rakkalaq |
| 971 | pandanus | *rok |
| 977 | ridge; blacksoil area; grass used in corroborees | *ruwurr |
| 999 | Phragmites | *Tarrin |
| 1058 | Leichhardt tree | *Tupal |
| 1089 | quinine brush | *thorrowq |
| 1091 | Acacia holosericea | *thukkul |
| 1095 | Canthium attenuatum, Exocarpos latifolius | *thumuk |
| 1096 | bloodwood | *thumurluk |
| 1101 | pandanus | *T(h)ayarr |
| 1154 | vine sp. - Cynanchum pedunculatum | *warnpek |
| 1169 | plant sp.; Exocarpos latifolus; lemon grass | *warrinycalan |
| 1181 | Grevillea pteridifolia | *watpar |
| 1239 | black plum | *wucal |
| 1259 | pandanus | *yakngarra |
