= Mangarrayi language =

Australian Aboriginal language

Mangarrayi
- Native to: Australia
- Region: Northern Territory
- Ethnicity: Mangarrayi
- Native speakers: 2 (2019)
- Language family: Macro-Gunwinyguan ?: Marran–Mangarrayi; Mangarrayi

Language codes
- ISO 639-3: mpc
- Glottolog: mang1381
- AIATSIS: N78
- ELP: Mangarrayi
- Mangarrayi is classified as Critically Endangered by the UNESCO Atlas of the World's Languages in Danger.

Mangarrayi (Manggarrai, Mungerry, Ngarrabadji) is an Australian language spoken in the Northern Territory by only two people as of 2019. It is related to the Marran languages, though its further classification is uncertain.

== History ==
Most Mangarrayi people live in the community of Jilkminggan, Northern Territory, with which it is traditionally connected with. The Mangarrayi people are the traditional owners of Jilkminggan and the surrounding land. It has been replaced in the domain of daily communication by Kriol.

=== Documentation ===
Margaret Sharpe originally sought to record the language, but turned to the study of Alawa after the station owner where her informants lived denied her access, having tired of the presence of researchers on the property.

== Classification ==
The online language database Glottolog classifies Mangarrayi as related to the Marran languages. Marran and Mangarrayi have been connected to other languages in the propsed Macro-Gunwinyguan or Arnhem family, though Glottolog considers the evidence inconclusive.

== Speakers ==
The 2016 Australian Bureau of Statistics official census indicates that there are no speakers of Mangarrayi remaining; however, elders Sheila Conway and Jessie Roberts are both speakers of Mangarrayi. The 2021 census recorded 10 speakers. Conway continues to make an important contribution to language revitalization projects in Jilkminggan. Other people with more limited command of Mangarrayi also reside at Jilkminggan.

== Phonology ==
=== Consonants ===
	Peripheral		Laminal	Apical		Glottal
	Labial	Velar	Palatal	Alveolar	Retroflex	Glottal
Plosive	p	k	c	t	ʈ	ʔ
Nasal	m	ŋ	ɲ	n	ɳ	
Rhotic				ɾ	ɻ	
Lateral				l	ɭ	
Approximant	w		j			

=== Vowels ===
	Front	Central	Back
High	i		u
Mid	e		o
Low		a	

Vowels /i, u, e, o/ can have lax allophones of [ɪ, ʊ, ɛ, o̞].

== Vocabulary ==
Capell (1940) lists the following basic vocabulary items for Mungarai (Mangarayi):

gloss	Mungarai
man	malaṉ
woman	gaɖugu
head	gaia
eye	djib
nose	miliŋ
mouth	djäɽäb
tongue	djawi
stomach	daɽa
bone	dama
blood	guranjin
kangaroo	garawi
opossum	widjwidj
crow	wagwag
fly	mɔːdj
sun	ganjwar
moon	giidj
fire	damaia
smoke	gunburau
water	ŋogo

=== Numeric system ===
Mangarrayi has a number system that extends only to three.

== Notes and references ==
=== References ===
- Sharpe, Margaret (2008). "Alawa and its Neighbours: Enigma Variations 1 and 2". In Bowern, Claire; Evans, Bethwyn; Miceli, Luisa (eds.). Morphology and Language History: In Honour of Harold Koch. John Benjamins Publishing. pp. 59–70. ISBN 978-9-027-24814-5.
- Jessie Garalnganyjak Roberts et al., 2011, Mangarrayi and Yangman plants and animals : Aboriginal biocultural knowledge from Elsey and the Roper River, north Australia, Darwin : Dept. of Natural Resources, Environment, the Arts and Sport : Diwurruwurru-Jaru Aboriginal Corp./Mimi Aboriginal Art & Craft
- Merlan, F., 1982, Mangarayi, Lingua Descriptive Series, vol. 4, Amsterdam
