= Nunggubuyu language =

Aboriginal Australian language

Nunggubuyu
- Wubuy
- Native to: Australia
- Region: Numbulwar, Northern Territory
- Ethnicity: Nunggubuyu people
- Native speakers: 283 (2021 census) perhaps 400 semi-speakers and second language speakers
- Language family: Macro-Pama-Nyungan?: Macro-Gunwinyguan; East Arnhem; Nunggubuyu

Language codes
- ISO 639-3: nuy
- Glottolog: nung1290
- AIATSIS: N128
- ELP: Wubuy
- Nunggubuyu is classified as Severely Endangered by the UNESCO Atlas of the World's Languages in Danger.

Nunggubuyu or Wubuy is an Australian Aboriginal language traditionally spoken by the Nunggubuyu people. It is the traditional language spoken in the community of Numbulwar in the Northern Territory, although Numbulwar is traditionally associated with the Warndarrang language.

The language is classified as severely endangered by UNESCO.

== Name ==
Wubuy is the language's endonym. The name Nunggubuyu probably originates from the English pronunciation of nun (gentilic prefix) and wubuy, meaning "people (speaking) Wubuy".

== Classification ==
The classification of Nunggubuyu is problematic. Heath (1997) postulates that Nunggubuyu is most closely related to Ngandi and Anindilyakwa. However, Evans (2003) believes that the similarities are shared retentions rather than shared innovations, and that Nunggubuyu is closest to the eastern Gunwinyguan languages.

Brett Baker (2004) demonstrates that Ngandi and Wubuy form an "Eastern Gunwinyguan" subgroup as distinct from the "jala"/"Rembarngic" subgroup which includes Rembarrnga and Ngalakgan. Furthermore, Van Egmond's (2012) study of the genetic position of Anindilyakwa supports Heath's hypothesis that Ngandi, Anindilyakwa and Wubuy/Nunggubuyu do constitute one subgroup within Gunwinyguan. Van Egmond and Baker (2020) expand Van Egmond's (2012) evidence with lexical comparison, demonstrating that Wubuy is related to both Ngandi and Anindilyakwa, but shares more sound changes and lexical items with the latter.

== Vitality ==
The language is classified as severely endangered by UNESCO, with only 283 speakers according to the 2021 census. Most children in Numbulwar can understand Nunggubuyu when spoken to, but cannot speak it themselves, having to reply in Kriol. To counter this, starting in 1990, the community has been embarking on a revitalisation programme for the language by bringing in elders to teach it to children at the local school.

== Phonology ==
=== Consonants ===
	Peripheral		Laminal		Apical	
	Bilabial	Velar	Palatal	Dental	Alveolar	Retroflex
Nasal	m	ŋ	ɲ	n̪	n	ɳ
Plosive	p	k	c	t̪	t	ʈ
Tap					ɾ	
Lateral				l̪	l	ɭ
Approximant	w		j			ɻ

/n̪/ is rare. /ɾ/ may optionally be pronounced as a trill when it occurs in word-initial position, which is rare.

=== Vowels ===
	Front	Back
High	i iː	u uː
Low	a aː	

== Numbers ==
Nunggubuyu uses a quinary number system.

base numeral			+5			×5		
1_{5}	1	anjbadj	11_{5}	6	maralibalinala mari anjbadj	10_{5}	5	marangandjbugidj
2_{5}	2	wulawa	12_{5}	7	maralibalinala mari wulawa	20_{5}	10	wurumulumara ngandjabugidj
3_{5}	3	wulanjbadj	13_{5}	8	maralibalinala mari wulanjbadj	30_{5}	15	wurumulumbulanbadj
4_{5}	4	wulawulal	14_{5}	9	maralibalinala mari wulawulal	40_{5}	20	wurumulumbulalwulal
10_{5}	5	marangandjbugidj	20_{5}	10	wurumulumara ngandjabugidj			

== Sample text ==
Ba-marang-dhayiyn
Ba-marang-gagagiyn
B a-marang-dhayiyn
Ba-marang-jaljaliyn
Ba-wan.ngang "hokey pokey"
Badhawawa-rumiyn
Aba dani-yung-bugij

(the Hokey Pokey in Wubuy)
