= Mayali dialect =

Australian Aboriginal language

Mayali
- Manyallaluk Mayali
- Native to: Australia
- Region: Northern Territory
- Ethnicity: Bininj
- Native speakers: 71 (2021 census)
- Language family: Arnhem: Gunwinyguan; Gunwinggic; Bininj Kunwok; Mayali

Language codes
- ISO 639-3: –
- Glottolog: naia1238
- AIATSIS: N44 Mayali

Mayali or Manyallaluk Mayali is a dialect of Bininj Kunwok, an Australian Aboriginal language. The Aboriginal people who speak Mayali are the Bininj people, who live primarily in western Arnhem Land. Mayali is spoken primarily in south-west Arnhem Land, particularly around Pine Creek, Katherine and Manyallaluk. Occasionally the term "Mayali" is used to refer to all Bininj Kunwok dialects collectively, however this is not generally accepted usage. Speakers of the Kundjeyhmi dialect of Bininj Kunwok often regard Mayali as similar to, or even the same as, Kundjeyhmi.
