= Tree rat =

Tree rat or tree-rat may refer to the following rodents:

- Black rat (Rattus rattus), occurring worldwide;
- Brachytarsomys (several species), from Madagascar;
- Callistomys (the painted tree-rat), from Brazil;
- Carpomys, from the Philippines;
- Chiromyscus (Fea's tree rat), from southeastern Asia;
- Conilurus, from Australia and southern New Guinea;
- Diplomys labilis, the rufous tree rat, from Panama, Colombia, and Ecuador;
- Diplothrix, the Ryukyus Islands tree rat, from the Ryukyu Islands;
- Echimys, from Amazonia;
- Kadarsanomys, Sody's tree rat, from Java;
- Lenothrix, the gray tree rat, from Southeast Asia;
- Lonchothrix, the tuft-tailed spiny tree rat, from Brazil;
- Makalata, from Amazonia;
- Mesembriomys, from Australia;
- Mesomys, from Amazonia;
- Niviventer langbianis, the dark-tailed tree rat, from Southeast Asia;
- Papagomys armandvillei, the Flores giant tree rat, from Flores;
- Pattonomys, from South America;
- Phyllomys, from the Atlantic Forest of eastern South America;
- Pithecheir, from Southeast Asia;
- Santamartamys, the red crested tree rat, from Colombia;
- Thallomys nigricauda, the black-tailed tree rat, from southwestern Africa;
- Toromys, the giant tree rat, from Brazil;
- Xenuromys, the mimic tree-rat, from New Guinea;
- Mesocricetus auratus, the Syrian hamster.
- Macaque. see Monkey hate article for more context
