= Wagiman =

Aboriginal Australian people

The Wagiman, also spelt Wagoman, Wagaman, Wogeman, and other variants, are an Aboriginal Australian people of the Northern Territory.

== Language ==
The Wagiman language is a language isolate. It has been contrasted for its comparative roughness to the smooth, euphonious sound of Marrithiel spoken down country by the Marrithiyal people.

== Country ==
The Wagiman had, in Tindale's estimation, approximately 1,800 square miles (4,700 km^{2}) of territory in the area southwest of the Daly River, and in the area of Dorisvale, and from Bamboo Creek northwards as far as Douglas Homestead. Their frontier to the west, west of Oooloo, lay on the Daly River Crossing close to Mount Nancar, a place where they were accustomed to meet up with the neighbouring tribes, the Kamor and Ngolokwangga. It was considered a stony country.

== Social organisation ==
The western tribes of the Wagiman were called collectively the Wongkakaringa, according to Tindale.

== Alternative names ==
- Wagaman, Wageman, Wogeman
- Wongkakaringa
- Ongkakaringa

== Sources ==
- Stanner, W. E. H. (June 1933a). "The Daly River Tribes: a Report of Field Work in North Australia". Oceania. 3 (4): 377–405. doi:10.1002/j.1834-4461.1933.tb01674.x. JSTOR 40327429.
- Stanner, W. E. H. (December 1933b). "Ceremonial economics of the Mulluk Mulluk and Madngella tribes of the Daly River". Oceania. 4 (2). JSTOR 40327457.
- Stanner, W. E. H. (June 1936). "Note on Djamindjung Kinship and Totemism". Oceania. 6 (4): 441–451. doi:10.1002/j.1834-4461.1936.tb00204.x. JSTOR 40327576.
- Stanner, W. E. H. (September 1938). "Notes on the Marithiel Language". Oceania. 9 (1): 101–108. doi:10.1002/j.1834-4461.1938.tb00220.x. JSTOR 40327703.
- Tindale, Norman Barnett (1974). "Wagoman (NT)". Aboriginal Tribes of Australia: Their Terrain, Environmental Controls, Distribution, Limits, and Proper Names. Australian National University.
