= Uwinymil language =

Extinct Australian Aboriginal language

Uwinymil
- Native to: Australia
- Region: Arnhem Land
- Ethnicity: Awinmul = Norweilemil
- Extinct: (date missing)
- Language family: Arnhem: Gunwinyguan; Warrayic; Uwinymil

Language codes
- ISO 639-3: None (mis)
- Glottolog: uwin1234
- AIATSIS: N37.1

Uwinymil, also spelt Uwinjmil and also known as Awinmul, is an extinct Australian Aboriginal language of Arnhem Land in the Northern Territory of Australia.

Speakers of the language were recorded as inhabiting the area around Mt Bundey and Mount Goyder.
