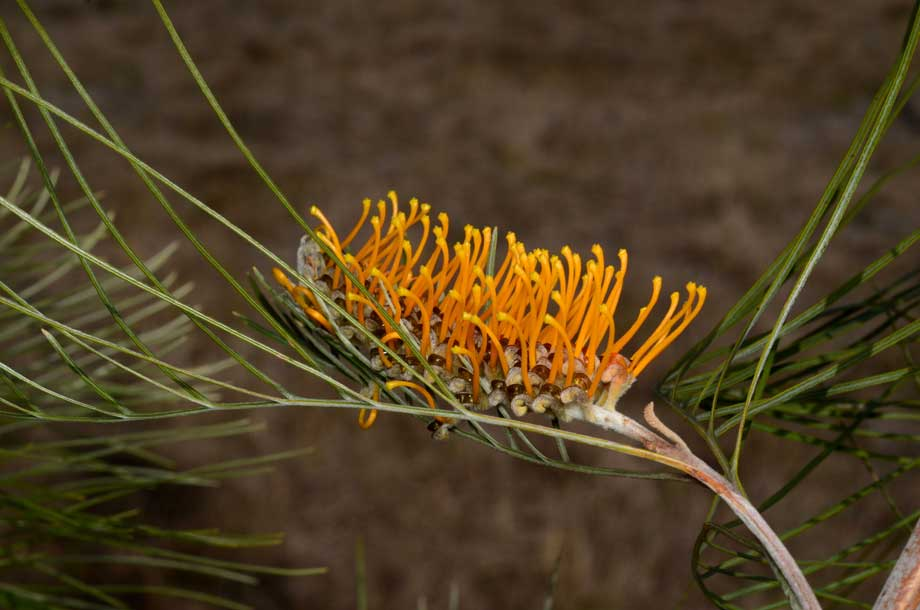
- Grevillea pteridifolia in Myall Park Botanic Garden

Scientific classification
- Kingdom: Plantae
- Clade: Tracheophytes
- Clade: Angiosperms
- Clade: Eudicots
- Order: Proteales
- Family: Proteaceae
- Genus: Grevillea
- Species: G. pteridifolia

Binomial name
- Grevillea pteridifolia Knight

Synonyms
- List: Grevillea chrysodendron R.Br.; Grevillea chrysodendrum R.Br. orth. var.; Grevillea mitchellii Hook.; Grevillea pteridifolia var. mitchellii (Hook.) Domin; Grevillea pteridifolia Knight var. pteridifolia; Grevillea pteridifolia var. typica Domin nom. inval.; Grevillea pteridiifolia Chippend. orth. var.; Grevillia pteridifolia Knight orth. var.

= Grevillea pteridifolia =

Golden grevillea

Species of shrub endemic to Australia

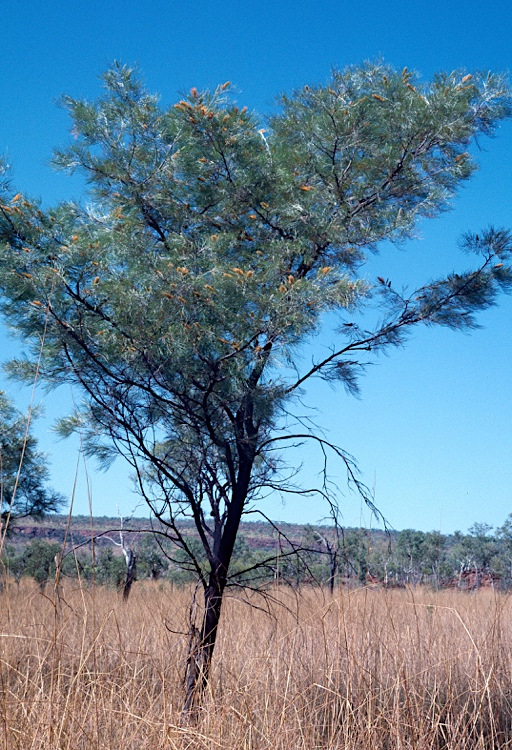
Habit in the Keep River National Park

Grevillea pteridifolia is a species of flowering plant in the family Proteaceae and is endemic to northern Australia. It is also known by many common names, including golden grevillea, silky grevillea, fern-leaved grevillea, golden parrot tree, golden tree, manbulu, yawuny and tjummula. It is a shrub or tree usually with pinnatisect leaves, and bright orange-yellow or reddish flowers.

== Description ==
Grevillea pteridifolia is a shrub or tree that typically grows to a height of 2–14 m (6 ft 7 in – 45 ft 11 in), or rarely a prostrate shrub. Its leaves are 100–450 mm (3.9–17.7 in) long and usually pinnatisect with 13 to 29 linear or very narrowly egg-shaped lobes 150–250 mm (5.9–9.8 in) long and 1–4 mm (0.039–0.157 in) wide. The edges of the leaves are rolled under, the exposed parts of the lower surface covered with silky hairs. The flowers are arranged in clusters on one side of a rachis 80–220 mm (3.1–8.7 in) long, the flowers at the base of the cluster opening first. The flowers are greyish-green to silvery on the outside, the inside and the style bright orange-yellow or reddish, the pistil 23–36 mm (0.91–1.42 in) long. Flowering occurs in most months with a peak from May to September and the fruit is a shaggy-hairy follicle 14–21 mm (0.55–0.83 in) long.

Plants from Queensland are non-lignotuberous shrubs to small trees with smooth bark and lighter inflorescences than other forms. A prostrate form which spreads up to 5 m (16 ft) across is found on exposed areas near Cooktown in north Queensland. Plants from Western Australia and the Northern Territory grow as a rough-barked lignotuberous shrub to small tree. A population of this last form from Kakadu National Park has all-silvery leaves.

== Taxonomy ==
Grevillea pteridifolia was first collected by Europeans from the vicinity of the Endeavour River sometime around 10 June and again from Lookout Point around 4 August 1770 by Joseph Banks and Daniel Solander, naturalists on the Endeavour during Lieutenant (later Captain) James Cook's first voyage to the Pacific Ocean. However, the description of the species was not published until Joseph Knight described it in his 1809 work On the cultivation of the plants belonging to the natural order of Proteeae as Grevillia Pteridifolia (the "Pteris-leaved Grevillia"). The following year Robert Brown gave it the name Grevillea chrysodendron in his work Prodromus Florae Novae Hollandiae et Insulae Van Diemen. In 1870, George Bentham used Brown's name in volume 5 of his landmark publication Flora Australiensis, however it has since been reduced to synonymy with Grevillea pteridifolia as it is not the oldest published name.

== Distribution and habitat ==
Grevillea pteridifolia is found from the Kimberley region of Western Australia, across the Northern Territory and into Queensland where it is found along the Great Dividing Range to the vicinity of Barcaldine. It is found in regions with wet summers, dry winters and 500 to 1,500 mm (20 to 59 in) annual rainfall.

== Uses and cultivation ==
Golden grevillea grows readily in warm climates, generally preferring extra water in summer and well-drained soils. The brittle branches can break in strong winds. Several popular garden grevilleas are hybrids between Grevillea pteridifolia and other species. Grevillea 'Sandra Gordon' is the result of crossing with G. sessilis. Grevillea 'Honey Gem' is a cross with a red form of Grevillea banksii. Similar to 'Honey Gem' is G. 'Winter Sparkles', another hybrid of G. pteridifolia and G. banksii.

The leaves were used as stuffing and as a herb when cooking emu by the Aborigines on Groote Eylandt, and used by early settlers to stuff pillows.

A series of compounds with antibacterial activity, called the kakadumycins, have been isolated from a streptomycete recovered from G. pteridifolia.
