= Fortis and lenis =

Phonemically contrasting consonant sounds

In linguistics, fortis (/ˈfɔːrtɪs/ FOR-tiss; Latin for 'strong') and lenis (/ˈliːnɪs/, /ˈlɛnɪs/ LEE-niss, LEN-iss; Latin for 'weak'), sometimes identified with 'tense' and 'lax', are pronunciations of consonants with relatively greater and lesser energy, respectively. English has fortis consonants, such as the p in pat, with a corresponding lenis consonant, such as the b in bat. Fortis and lenis consonants may be distinguished by tenseness or other characteristics, such as voicing, aspiration, glottalization, velarization, length, and length of nearby vowels. Fortis and lenis were coined for languages where the contrast between sounds such as those represented by ⟨p⟩ and ⟨b⟩ does not involve a difference of voicing (vibration of the vocal cords).

== History ==
Originally, the terms were used to refer to an impressionistic sense of strength differences, though more sophisticated instruments eventually gave the opportunity to search for the acoustic and articulatory signs. For example, Malécot (1968) tested whether articulatory strength could be detected by measuring the force of the contact between the articulators or of the peak pressure in the mouth. Because such studies initially found little to substantiate the terminology, phoneticians have largely ceased using them, though they are still commonly used as "phonological labels for specifying a dichotomy when used language-specifically." This can be useful when the actual articulatory features underlying the distinction are unknown, under-researched or irrelevant.

== Characteristics ==
=== Articulatory strength ===
Later studies have shown that articulatory strength is not completely irrelevant. The articulators in the mouth can move with a greater velocity and/or with higher electromyographic activation levels of the relevant articulatory muscles with fortis consonants than with lenis ones.

==== Oral pressure ====
Generally, voiceless stops have greater oral pressure than voiced ones, which could explain this greater articulatory energy. In Ewe, for example, the lips reach closure faster in articulating /p/ than in /b/, making the lip closure longer. These differences in oral articulatory energy in consonants of different laryngeal settings is fairly widespread, though the correlation of energy and voicing is not universal. Indeed, a number of languages have been proposed as making strength differences independently of voicing, such as Tabasaran, Archi, Udi, and Aghul.

==== Subglottal pressure ====
It is rare for the use of greater respiratory energy for segments to occur in a language, though some examples do exist, such as Korean, which makes a three way contrast amongst most of its obstruents with voiceless, aspirated, and a third faucalized voiced set that involves both an increase in subglottal pressure as well as greater glottal constriction and tenseness in the walls of the vocal tract. Igbo has also been observed to utilize an increase in subglottal pressure involving its aspirated consonants.

=== Consonant length ===
"Fortis" and "lenis" have also been used to refer to contrasts of consonant duration in languages like Jawoyn, Ojibwe, Dalabon, Kunwinjku, and Zurich German. The Zapotec languages are also considered to have contrast of length rather than of voicing. For example, in Mixe, lenis consonants are not only pronounced shorter than their fortis counterparts, but they are also prone to voicing in voiced environments, which fortis consonants are not.

This association with longer duration has prompted some to propose a diachronic link between fortis consonants and gemination. Payne (2006) even proposes that gemination is itself a process of fortition in Italian.

Many North Caucasian languages (Northwest and especially Northeast) have a consonantal distinction described as "strong" or "preruptive" that has concomitant length. Akhvakh and other Northeast Caucasian languages even possess a distinction between strong/long and weak/short ejective consonants: [qʼaː] ('soup') vs. [qʼːama] ('cock's comb')

=== Relationship between strength and length ===
Kodzasov (1977) describes the fortis consonants for Archi:

Strong phonemes are characterized by the intensiveness (tension) of the articulation. The intensity of the pronunciation leads to a natural lengthening of the duration of the sound, and that is why strong [consonants] differ from weak ones by greater length. [However,] the adjoining of two single weak sounds does not produce a strong one [...] Thus, the gemination of a sound does not by itself create its tension.

Fortis stops in Australian Aboriginal languages such as Rembarunga (see Ngalakgan) also involve length, with short consonants having weak contact and intermittent voicing, and long consonants having full closure, a more powerful release burst, and no voicing. It is not clear if strength makes the consonants long, or if during long consonants there is a greater opportunity for full articulation.

=== Enforcement of phonemic distinctions ===
Articulatory strength can reinforce other distinctions. Ewe, for example, which contrasts a voiceless bilabial fricative /ɸ/ and a voiceless labiodental fricative /f/, pronounces the latter markedly more strongly than /f/ in most languages. This helps differentiate what would otherwise be a very subtle distinction.

In English, use of the terms "fortis" and "lenis" is useful to refer to contrasts between consonants that have different phonetic attributes depending on context. The alveolar consonants /t/ and /d/, for example:

Allophones of American English /t/ and /d/
	lenis			fortis		
	form	example		form	example	
Word-initial	[d̥]	[ˈd̥ɑ̆k̚]	dock	[tʰ]	[ˈtʰɑ̆p̚]	top
Syllable-final	[d̥]	[ˈnɑd̥]	nod	[V̆t̚]	[ˈnɑ̆t̚]	knot
Syllable-final	[d̥]	[ˈnɑd̥]	nod	[V̆ˀt̚]	[ˈnɑ̆ˀt̚]	knot
Syllable-final	[d̥]	[ˈnɑd̥]	nod	[V̆ʔ]	[ˈnɑ̆ʔ]	knot
Stressed syllable-initial	[d]	[əˈdɑ̆pt]	adopt	[tʰ]	[əˈtʰɑ̆p̚]	atop
Word-internal unstressed	[Vɾ]	[ˈɑɾɹ̩]^{[a]}	odder	[V̆ɾ]	[ˈɑ̆ɾɹ̩]	otter
Word-internal unstressed	[V̆ɾ]	[ˈɑ̆ɾɹ̩]	odder	[V̆ɾ]	[ˈɑ̆ɾɹ̩]	otter
Following [s]^{[b]}				[t]	[ˈstɑ̆p̚]	stop

^a Depending on dialect, /t/ and /d/ may not neutralize with flapping, with the contrast manifesting itself in the preceding vowel's duration.
^b In the same syllable, the distinction between /t/ and /d/ is lost after [s].

As the above table shows, no one feature is adequate to accurately reflect the contrasts in all contexts. Word-initially, the contrast has more to do with aspiration; /t/ is aspirated and /d/ is an unaspirated voiceless stop. In the syllable coda, however, /t/ is instead pronounced with glottalization, unrelease, and a shorter vowel while /d/ remains voiceless. In this way, the terms fortis and lenis are convenient in discussing English phonology, even if they are phonetically imprecise.

In southern German dialects, the actual distinction underlying obstruent pairs varies somewhat depending on the dialect, but is often one of length—fortis sounds are pronounced geminated in all positions in a word, even at the end of a word or before other consonants.

== Notation ==
Voice onset time

+ Aspirated
0 Tenuis
− Voiced

The IPA provides no specific means for representation of a fortis–lenis contrast. The extensions to the International Phonetic Alphabet provide a diacritic for strong articulation (e.g. [t͈]) and weak articulation ([t͉]), but this does not cover all of the phonetic differences that have been categorized under fortis and lenis. Americanist phonetic notation uses fortis [t͈] and lenis [t᷂].

Different ways of transcribing the fortis–lenis contrast have been used. For instance, for the transcription of the Zürich German fortis–lenis contrast – which involves neither voicing nor aspiration – notations such as the following ones have appeared in the relevant literature:

- The fortis–lenis contrast may be transcribed with plain [p t k f s ʃ x] vs [b d ɡ v z ʒ ɣ].
- The fortis–lenis contrast may be transcribed as a gemination contrast ([pː tː kː fː sː ʃː xː] or [pp tt kk ff ss ʃʃ xx] vs [p t k f s ʃ x]).
- The fortis–lenis contrast may be transcribed as [p t k f s ʃ x] vs [b̥ d̥ ɡ̊ v̥ z̥ ʒ̊ ɣ̊], that is, the lenes are marked with the IPA diacritic for voicelessness. By strict IPA definition, ⟨b̥ d̥ ɡ̊ v̥ z̥ ʒ̊ ɣ̊⟩ in this context can only denote partially devoiced obstruents. This notation emphasizes that there is more than just voice to the contrast between [p t k f s ʃ x] vs [b̥ d̥ ɡ̊ v̥ z̥ ʒ̊ ɣ̊].

This means that depending on the system, ⟨p t k f s ʃ x⟩ may have opposite values, i.e. they may represent either fortis or lenis sounds.

== See also ==
- Irish phonology
- Tenseness

== Bibliography ==
- Blevins, Juliette (2004). Evolutionary phonology. Cambridge: Cambridge University Press.
- Catford, J.C. (1977). Fundamental problems in phonetics. Bloomington: Indiana University Press.
- Elugbe, Ben Ohi (1980), "Reconstructing the lenis feature in proto-Ẹdoid", Journal of African Languages and Linguistics, 2: 39–67, doi:10.1515/jall.1980.2.1.39, S2CID 143757407
- Fleischer, Jürg; Schmid, Stephan (2006), "Zurich German", Journal of the International Phonetic Association, 36 (2): 243–253, doi:10.1017/s0025100306002441
- Fletcher, Janet; Evans, Nicholas (2002), "An acoustic phonetic analysis of intonational prominence in two Australian languages", Journal of the International Phonetic Association, 32 (2): 123–140, doi:10.1017/s0025100302001019, S2CID 144244382
- Halle, Morris; Hughes, GW; Radley, JPA (1957), "Acoustic properties of stop consonants", Journal of the Acoustical Society of America, 29 (1): 107–116, Bibcode:1957ASAJ...29..107H, doi:10.1121/1.1908634
- Jaeger, Jeri J. (1983), "The fortis/lenis question: evidence from Zapotec and Jawoñ", Journal of Phonetics, 11 (2): 177–189, doi:10.1016/S0095-4470(19)30814-9
- Kodzasov, Sandro (1977), "Fonetika Archinskogo Jazyka. Part 2", in Kibrik, A.E.; Kodzasov, S.V.; Olovjannikova, I.P.; et al. (eds.), Opyt Strukturnogo Opisanija Archinskogo Jazyka, vol. 1, Moscow: Izdatel'stvo Moskovskogo Universiteta
- Ladefoged, Peter; Maddieson, Ian (1996). The Sounds of the World's Languages. Oxford: Blackwell. ISBN 0-631-19815-6.
- Malécot, André (1968), "The Force of Articulation of American Stops and Fricatives as a Function of Position", Phonetica, 18 (2): 95–102, doi:10.1159/000258603, S2CID 143341058
- Merrill, Elizabeth (2008), "Tilquiapan Zapotec" (PDF), Journal of the International Phonetic Association, 38 (1): 107–114, doi:10.1017/S0025100308003344, archived from the original (PDF) on 2019-12-16
- Nellis, Donald G.; Hollenbach, Barbara E. (1980), "Fortis versus lenis in Cajonos Zapotec phonology", International Journal of American Linguistics, 46 (2): 92–105, doi:10.1086/465639, S2CID 144452370
- Payne, Elinor (2006), "Non-durational indices in Italian geminate consonants", Journal of the International Phonetic Association, 36 (1): 83–95, doi:10.1017/s0025100306002398, S2CID 145195122
- Silverman, Daniel (2004), "On the phonetic and cognitive nature of alveolar stop allophony in American English" (PDF), Cognitive Linguistics, 15 (1): 69–93, doi:10.1515/cogl.2004.002, archived from the original (PDF) on 2016-03-22
- Slis, I.H. (1971), "Articulatory effort and its durational and electromyographic correlates", Phonetica, 23 (3): 171–188, doi:10.1159/000259338, S2CID 145206392
- Smith, Bruce L.; McLean-Muse, Ann (1987), "Kinematic Characteristics of Postvocalic Labial Stop Consonants Produced by Children and Adults", Phonetica, 44 (4): 227–237, doi:10.1159/000261800, PMID 3505356, S2CID 19489369
- Swadesh, Morris (1947), "The phonemic structure of Proto-Zapotec", International Journal of American Linguistics, 13 (4): 220–230, doi:10.1086/463959, S2CID 143985027
