= Gunwinyguan languages =

Language family of Australia

Gunwinyguan
- (dubious)
- Geographic distribution: Arnhem Land, northern Australia
- Linguistic classification: Arnhem (Macro-Gunwinyguan): Gunwinyguan
- Subdivisions: Gunwinggic; Dalabon; Jala; Jawoyn; Warrayic

Language codes
- Glottolog: gunw1250
- Gunwinyguan languages (purple) and other Non-Pama–Nyungan languages (grey). Clockwise from the north, the 5 groups are Gunwinggic, Dalabon, Jala, Jawoyn + Warray, Uwinymil. The heavy black line outlines other languages sometimes included in Gunwinyguan (see Arnhem languages).

The Gunwinyguan languages (Gunwinjguan, Gunwingguan), also core Gunwinyguan or Gunwinyguan proper, are a proposed language family of Australian Aboriginal languages in Arnhem Land, northern Australia. The most populous language is Kunwinjku, with some 1500 speakers.

Gunwinyguan languages have a fortis–lenis contrast in plosive consonants. Lenis/short plosives have weak contact and intermittent voicing, while fortis/long plosives have full closure, a more powerful release burst, and no voicing.

== Membership ==
In 2003, Rebecca Green proposed the following membership for Gunwinyguan:

- Gunwinggic: Kunwinjku (Gunwinggu), Kunbarlang
- Jawoyn (Djauan)
- Dalabon (Ngalkbun)
- Jala (Rembarngic): Rembarrnga, Ngalakgan
- Warrayic: Waray, Uwinymil

However, Green believes the similarities among these languages are due to shared retentions from Proto-Arnhem, and are not indicative of an exclusive relationship between them.

Yangmanic had once been included, but has been removed from recent classifications. Various other languages appear to be related to this Gunwinyguan core. This larger family is sometimes also called Gunwinyguan, but more unambiguously Macro-Gunwinyguan or Arnhem.
