= Bininj Kunwok =

Australian Aboriginal language

- Bininj Gun-Wok
- Gunwinggu
- Native to: Australia
- Region: Northern Territory
- Ethnicity: Bininj (Kunwinjku etc.)
- Native speakers: 2,257 (2021 census)
- Language family: Arnhem: Gunwinyguan; Gunwinggic; Bininj Kunwok
- Dialects: Kunwinjku; Kuninjku; Kune; Mayali; Kundjeyhmi; Kundedjnjenghmi

Language codes
- ISO 639-3: gup
- Glottolog: gunw1252
- AIATSIS: N186 Bininj Gun-wok
- ELP: Bininj Gun-wok

Bininj Kunwok is an Australian Aboriginal language which includes six dialects: Kunwinjku (formerly Gunwinggu), Kuninjku, Kundjeyhmi (formerly Gundjeihmi), Manyallaluk Mayali (Mayali), Kundedjnjenghmi, and two varieties of Kune (Kune Dulerayek and Kune Narayek). Kunwinjku is the dominant dialect, and also sometimes used to refer to the group. The spellings Bininj Gun-wok and Bininj Kun-Wok have also been used in the past, however Bininj Kunwok is the current standard orthography.

The Aboriginal people who speak the dialects are the Bininj people, who live primarily in western Arnhem Land. There are over two thousand fluent speakers in an area roughly bounded by Kakadu National Park to the west, the Arafura Sea to the north, the Blyth River to the east, and the Katherine region to the south.

As a recent umbrella term for a group of mutually intelligible dialects, Bininj Kunwok itself is not included in the Australian census, however the individual dialects are. In the 2021 census, 1494 people reported being Kunwinjku language speakers, as well as 423 of Kuninjku, 257 of Kune, 71 of Mayali and 12 of Gundjeihmi (Kundjeyhmi), totalling 2,257 speakers. Kundedjnjenghmi was not offered as an option according to the Australian Standard Classification of Languages (ASCL).

== Dialects and naming ==
Evans (2003), who introduced the cover term Bininj Gun-wok for all dialects, identifies six dialects: Kunwinjku, Kuninjku, Gundjeihmi (now Kundjeyhmi), Manyallaluk Mayali, Kundedjnjenghmi, and two varieties of Kune most commonly known as Kune Dulerayek and Kune Narayek; based on the fact that

- the phonology, grammar and lexicon of these dialects share significant clusterings of properties
- these distinctions are recognised, at least by the relevant group and its neighbours, by the use of distinct language names.

As of 2020, AUSTLANG, under the title "N186: Bininj Gun-Wok / Bininj Kunwok", cites Evans' grouping, but adds that others have used Kunwinjku as the equivalent of Bininj Gun-wok (Dixon 2002). It also notes that Mayali has also sometimes been used in the same way.

Kunwinjku is spoken in the largest population centre, the township of Gunbalanya, and is the most widespread, with an ethnic population of around 900, almost all of whom speak Kunwinjku in spite of increasing exposure to English. Kundjeyhmi is spoken in the central part of Kakadu.

As of 2020, only three of the 12 original languages spoken in the Kakadu area are regularly spoken: Kundjeyhmi, Kunwinjku and Jawoyn. Kundjeyhmi and Kunwinjku are dialects of Bininj Kunwok, while Jawoyn is a separate language spoken in the southern areas.

As of June 2015, the Gundjeihmi dialect group officially adopted standard Kunwinjku orthography, meaning it would in future be spelt Kundjeyhmi.

== Phonology ==
Bininj Kunwok is typical of the languages of central Arnhem Land (and contrasts with most other Australian languages) in having a phonemic glottal stop, two stop series (short and long), five vowels without a length contrast, relatively complex consonant clusters in codas (though only single-consonant onsets) and no essential distinction between word and syllable phonotactics. The consonant and vowel tables include the standardized pan-dialectal orthography.

=== Consonant inventory ===
		Peripheral		Laminal	Apical		Glottal
		Bilabial	Velar	Postalveolar	Alveolar	Retroflex	Glottal
Stop	Lenis	p ⟨b⟩	k ⟨k⟩	c ⟨dj⟩	t ⟨d⟩	ʈ ⟨rd⟩	ʔ
Stop	Fortis	pː ⟨bb⟩	kː ⟨kk⟩	cː ⟨djdj⟩	tː ⟨dd⟩	ʈː ⟨rdd⟩	
Nasal		m ⟨m⟩	ŋ ⟨ng⟩	ɲ ⟨ny⟩	n ⟨n⟩	ɳ ⟨rn⟩	
Lateral					l ⟨l⟩	ɭ ⟨rl⟩	
Rhotic					r ⟨rr⟩	ɻ ⟨r⟩	
Approximant		w ⟨w⟩		j ⟨y⟩			

=== Vowel inventory ===
Monophthongs
	Front	Central	Back
High	i ⟨i⟩		u ⟨u⟩
Mid	e ⟨e⟩		o ⟨o⟩
Low		ä ⟨a⟩	

Diphthongs
	Front		Back	
High	ui̯ ⟨uy⟩		iu̯ ⟨iw⟩	
Mid	ei̯ ⟨ey⟩	oi̯ ⟨oy⟩	eu̯ ⟨ew⟩	ou̯ ⟨ow⟩
Low	ai̯ ⟨ay⟩		au̯ ⟨aw⟩	

This is an abnormal vowel inventory for one of the Australian Aboriginal languages, as most of them simply have a three-vowel /i/, /u/, /a/ system with length distinctions. Bininj Kunwok is unique in that it does not have length distinctions for vowels (despite having them for consonants), and has the mid vowels /e/ and /o/ as well as the usual three.

== Grammar ==
Bininj Kunwok is polysynthetic, with grammatical relations largely encoded within the complex verb. The verb carries obligatory polypersonal agreement, a number of derivational affixes (including benefactive, comitative, reflexive/reciprocal and TAM-morphology) and has an impressive potential for incorporation of both nouns and verbs.

The Kunwinjku dialect preserved four noun classes but lost the core case marking on the nouns, and a handful of semantic cases are optional. Kune and Manyallaluk Mayali dialects have an optional ergative marker -yih. Nominals have extensive derivational morphology and compounding.

=== Morphology ===
Morphology is mainly agglutinating, with fusion zones at the edges of the word.

=== Syntax ===
Bininj Kunwok shows syntactic patterns characteristic of 'non-configurational' languages: nominal modifiers can appear without the N head (typical of many Australian languages), there is no rigid order within the 'nominal group', and the distinction between predicative and argumental use of nominals is hard to make.
