= Ngandi language =

Australian Aboriginal language

Ngandi
- Region: Northern Territory
- Ethnicity: Ngandi
- Extinct: 2019, with the death of C. W. Daniels
- Language family: Arnhem: East Arnhem; Ngandi

Language codes
- ISO 639-3: nid
- Glottolog: ngan1295
- AIATSIS: N90
- ELP: Ngandi

Ngandi is an extinct Australian Aboriginal language of the Wilton River, Northern Territory. It is closely related to Nunggubuyu.

In 2017 the last fluent speaker of Ngandi, Cherry Wulumirr Daniels, began teaching the language to younger people at Ngukurr. She died in 2019.

== Phonology ==
=== Consonants ===
| | | Labial | Dental | Alveolar | Retroflex | Palatal | Velar | Glottal |
|---|---|---|---|---|---|---|---|---|
| Plosive | voiceless | p | t̪ | t | ʈ | c | k | |
| Plosive | voiced | b | d̪ | d | ɖ | ɟ | ɡ | |
| Nasal | | m | (n̪) | n | ɳ | ɲ | ŋ | |
| Lateral | | | (l̪) | l | ɭ | | | |
| Rhotic | | | | ɾ ~ r | ɻ | | | |
| Semivowel | | | | | | j | w | |
| Laryngeal | | | | | | | | ʔ |

- Rhotic phonemes can be heard as either a tap [ɾ] or a trill [r].
- /l̪/ and /n̪/ are "not really" phonemes and occur only in two or three words for flora and fauna, or from loanwords from neighboring languages.

=== Vowels ===
| | Front | Back |
|---|---|---|
| High | i iː | u uː |
| Mid | ɛ | ɔ ɔː |
| Low | a aː | |

/e/ and /o/ are described as "more open" than their counterparts in Spanish.

== Media ==
A short film, Lil Bois, written in the language and directed by Daniels's nephew, was released in 2018.
