= Rembarrnga language =

Australian Aboriginal language

Rembarrnga
- Rembarunga
- Native to: Australia
- Region: Northern Territory
- Ethnicity: Rembarrnga
- Native speakers: 51 (2021 census)
- Language family: Arnhem: Gunwinyguan; Rembarngic (Jala); Rembarrnga
- Dialects: NE Rembarunga; Kaltuy (Galduyh)

Language codes
- ISO 639-3: rmb
- Glottolog: remb1249
- AIATSIS: N73
- ELP: Rembarrnga

Rembarrnga (Rembarunga) is an Australian Aboriginal language. It is one of the Northern Non-Pama–Nyungan languages, spoken in the Roper River region of the Northern Territory. There are 3 dialects of Rembarrnga namely Galduyh, Gikkik and Mappurn.

It is a highly endangered language, with very few remaining fluent speakers. It is very likely that the language is no longer being learned by children. Instead, the children of Rembarrnga speakers are now learning neighbouring languages such as Kriol in south central Arnhem Land, and Kunwinjku, a dialect of Bininj Kunwok, in north central Arnhem Land.

== Geographic distribution ==
Rembarrnga is traditionally spoken in central Arnhem Land in the Northern Territory of Australia. Speakers currently live in the remote towns of Maningrida and Ramingining, and in nearby outstations such as Borlkdjam, Buluhkaduru and Malnyangarnak. The language is also associated with several other homeland communities including Ankebarrbirri, Barunga, Beswick and Bulman.

It is a highly endangered language with very few remaining fluent speakers. Children of Rembarrnga speakers have increasingly adopted neighbouring languages including Kriol in southern Arnhem Land and Kunwinjku in northern Arnhem Land.

Neighbouring languages include Dalabon, Burarra, Ngalakan, Ngandi and the Bininj Kunwok dialects Kunwinjku and Kune.

== Language vitalisation ==
Linguists who have worked with Rembarrnga speakers to produce language materials include Graham McKay, Carolyn Coleman and Adam Saulwick. Principal works on Rembarrnga include a grammar, a dictionary and a learner's guide.

== Phonology ==
=== Consonants ===
	Peripheral		Laminal	Apical		Glottal
	Labial	Velar	Palatal	Alveolar	Retroflex	Glottal
Plosive	p~b	k~ɡ	c~ɟ	t~d	ʈ~ɖ	(ʔ)
Nasal	m	ŋ	ɲ	n	ɳ	
Lateral				l	ɭ	
Tap/Trill				ɾ~r		
Approximant	w		j		ɻ	

- Stop sounds are voiced as [b, d, ɖ, ɟ, ɡ] when in word-initial position or following nasal sounds.
- A glottal stop [ʔ] is heard in syllable-final position when after vowels or sonorant sounds.
- /ɾ/ can also be heard as a trill [r] in intervocalic position.

=== Vowels ===
	Front	Central	Back
High	i		u
Mid	e	ə	o
Low		a	

- Vowels /i, e, a, o, u/ are heard as [ɪ, ɛ, æ, ɔ, ʊ] in closed syllables before /k/ and laminal sounds, and in glottalized open syllables.

== Grammar ==
=== Vocabulary ===
Animals
English	Rembarrnga	English	Rembarrnga
Kangaroo	Kuwenj	Shark	Balangu
Crocodile	Mokko	Dragonfly	Derrko
Snake	Dadbah	Caterpillar	Jabalanj
Dog	Jamu	Lizard	Dengbol
Turtle	Wamarra	Grasshopper	Ledled
Frog	Karkman	Saltwater crab	Bangkabarra

Pronouns
English	Rembarrnga
I, me	Nginda
You	Danda

Counting
English	Rembarrnga
None / nothing	Waba
1	Wangkinj
2	Yabban
3	Kurlbburr
4	Bundah-barra yabban
5	Langa
Many	Jubul

Adjectives
English	Rembarrnga
Good	Wula
Bad	Jarlna
Big	Karlena
Small	Dakkuna
Hot	Kangarrngarr
Cold	Ngulbidj

Temporal adverbs
English	Rembarrnga
Today	Dawa
Yesterday, in the recent past	Dabarang
Tomorrow	Kudarji
Next, then	Walang
