= Jawoyn language =

Australian Aboriginal language

Jawoyn
- Djauan
- Region: Arnhem Land, Australia
- Ethnicity: Jawoyn people
- Native speakers: 15 (2021 census)
- Language family: Arnhem: Gunwinyguan; Jawoyn
- Dialects: Jawoyn; Genhinj'mi; Ngarla'mi; Lhetburrirt; Ngan-wirlang

Language codes
- ISO 639-3: djn
- Glottolog: djau1244
- AIATSIS: N57
- ELP: Jawoyn
- Jawoyn is classified as Severely Endangered by the UNESCO Atlas of the World's Languages in Danger.

Jawoyn (Jawonj, Jawany, Djauan, Jawan, Jawony; Adowen, Gun-djawan), also known as Kumertuo, is a moribund Gunwinyguan language spoken only by elders in Arnhem Land, Australia.

== Phonology ==
=== Consonants ===
		Peripheral		Laminal	Apical		Glottal
		Labial	Velar	Palatal	Alveolar	Retroflex	Glottal
Plosive	voiceless	p	k	c	t	ʈ	ʔ
Plosive	tense	pː	kː	cː	tː	ʈː	
Nasal		m	ŋ	ɲ	n	ɳ	
Lateral					l	ɭ	
Rhotic					ɾ ~ r		
Approximant		w		j		ɻ	

/ɾ/ can be heard as either a tap [ɾ] or a trill [r].

=== Vowels ===
	Front	Central	Back
High	i		u
Mid	e		o
Low		a	
