= Peripheral consonant =

Non-coronal (lip and nasal) consonants

In Australian linguistics, the peripheral consonants are a natural class encompassing consonants articulated at the extremes of the mouth: labials (lip) and velars (soft palate). That is, they are the non-coronal consonants (palatal, dental, alveolar, and postalveolar). In Australian languages, these consonants pattern together both phonotactically and acoustically. In Arabic and Maltese philology, the moon letters transcribe non-coronal consonants, but they do not form a natural class.

== Phonology ==
Australian peripheral consonants
	Bilabial	Velar
Stop	p	k
Nasal	m	ŋ
Approximant	w	

Australian languages typically favour peripheral consonants word- and syllable-initially, and they are not allowed or common word- and syllable-finally, unlike the apicals.

In the extinct Martuthunira, the peripheral stops /p/ and /k/ shared similar allophony. Whereas the other stops could be voiced between vowels or following a nasal, the peripherals were usually voiceless.

== See also ==
- Rhinoglottophilia
