= Djinang people =

Indigenous Australian people

The Djinang are an Aboriginal Australian people of the Northern Territory.

== Name ==
The tribal ethnonym comes from an old form of the proximate deictic ('this'), namely djining.

== Country ==
The Djinang territories are often described in a way that overlaps with those of the Yan-nhaŋu. Norman Tindale, for example, allocates to them the 700 square miles (1,800 km^{2}) stretching over the Crocodile Islands and Milingimbi south to the mainland around the middle reaches of the Blyth River. On the continent they are said to extend east as far as the Glyde Inlet and river, as far as the northern margins of the Arafura Swamp. The modern authority on them, Bruce Waters, states that they are concentrated on the mainland, with only a few members on the islands.

== Language ==
Djinang is classified as one of the Yolŋu languages, but is not mutually intelligible with them. It is most closely related to Djinba, with which it is about 60% cognate. In 1989 it was estimated that some 200 Djinang-speakers were living at Ramangiŋing, with small numbers also on Milingimbi and at Maningrida

== Social organization ==
The Djinang are composed of seven clans

- Manyarring
- Marrangu
- Murrungun
- Balmbi
- Djadiwitjibi
- Mildjingi
- Wu(r)laki

Terms like 'clan' do not convey adequately the nature of the groups in such bands. Marrangu-Djinang for example, haa been described as 'a local territory with focal sites and affiliated set of people and sacra. Each term — Marrangu and Djinang — when employed separately has potential to denote a range of additional cultural references.'

== History of contact ==
With the coming of mission stations to the area a large number of Djinang lived at Milingimbi, or ast Maningrida, down at least to the end of the 1960s. Though only a minority were converted to Christianity, the Djinang and the Djinba retain a strong sense of respect for the influence of the missions, which reduced the fear of sorcery, and revenge killings, that were a major concern to both tribes in their homelands.

== Some words ==
- ama (mummy)
- butjiy (dog)
- gandayala (plains kangaroo)
- ingki (no)
- maḻu (daddy)

== Alternative names ==
- Balmawi
- Balmbi
- Barlmawi
- Djinnang, Djinhang
- Jandjinang, Jandjinung
- Manjarngi, (clan name) Manyarrngi
- Milingimbi, Millingimbi
- Munnarngo, Manarrngu
- Wulläkki, Wulaki, Ullaki, Wulagi
- Yandjinung, Yandjinning, Yandjinang

Source: Tindale 1974, p. 224

== Sources ==
- Elliott, Craig (2015). "Conceptual Dynamism and Ambiguity in Marrangu Djinang Cosmology, North-Central Arnhem Land". In Toner, P. G. (ed.). Strings of Connectedness: Essays in honour of Ian Keen. Australian National University. pp. 101–117. ISBN 9781925022629. JSTOR j.ctt183q3jp.12.
- Keen, Ian (August 1995). "Metaphor and the Metalanguage: "Groups" in Northeast Arnhem Land". American Ethnologist. 22 (3): 502–527. doi:10.1525/ae.1995.22.3.02a00030. JSTOR 645969.
- Thomson, Donald F. (August 1939). "The Tree Dwellers of the Arafura Swamps: A New Type of Bark Canoe from Central Arnhem Land". Man. 39: 121–126. doi:10.2307/2793391. JSTOR 2793391.
- Tindale, Norman Barnett (1974). "Djinang (NT)". Aboriginal Tribes of Australia: Their Terrain, Environmental Controls, Distribution, Limits, and Proper Names. Australian National University. ISBN 978-0-708-10741-6. Archived from the original on 17 February 2018.
- Warner, William Lloyd (April 1930). "Morphology and Functions of the Australian Murngin Type of Kinship". American Anthropologist. 32 (2): 207–256. doi:10.1525/aa.1930.32.2.02a00010. JSTOR 661305.
- Warner, William Lloyd (April–June 1931). "Morphology and Functions of the Australian Murngin Type of Kinship (Part II)". American Anthropologist. 33 (2): 172–198. doi:10.1525/aa.1931.33.2.02a00030. JSTOR 660835.
- Waters, Bruce E. (1989). Djinang and Djinba - A Grammatical and Historical Perspective (PDF). Research School of Pacific Studies. ISBN 085883-392-1.
