= Nhangu language =

Australian Aboriginal language of the Crocodile Islands

Nhangu
- Yan-nhaŋu
- Jarnango
- Region: Crocodile Islands, Northern Territory, Australia
- Ethnicity: Yan-nhaŋu
- Extinct: by 2011
- Revival: 1994
- Language family: Pama–Nyungan languages: Yolŋu Matha; Northern (Dhangu); Nhangu
- Dialects: Gorlpa; Yannhangu
- Signed forms: Yan-nhaŋu Sign Language

Language codes
- ISO 639-3: Either: jay – Yan-nhangu lja – Golpa
- Glottolog: yann1237 Nhangu
- AIATSIS: N211
- ELP: Yan-nhangu
- Golpa

The Nhangu language (Nhaŋu), also Yan-nhaŋu (Jarnango) is an Australian Aboriginal language spoken by the Yan-nhaŋu people, inhabitants of the Crocodile Islands off the coast of Arnhem Land, in the Northern Territory of Australia. The Yan-nhaŋu language belongs to the Yolŋu Matha language group of the Yolŋu people of Arnhem Land in northern Australia. The varieties of the two moieties are (a) Gorlpa and (b) Yan-nhangu.

== Language revival ==
The Yan-nhaŋu Language Team, started in 1994 by Laurie Baymarrwangga with encouragement from Bentley James, consists of linguists and native speakers working to compile resources for the description of Yan-nhaŋu culture and the revitalisation of Yan-nhaŋu language.

Laurie, unable to speak English, was able to express her desire to save her language when she met Bentley on Murruŋga Island. Bentley had started work as the outstations teacher and had learnt Djambarrpuyŋu. Having started with only 250 words, this dictionary work culminated in the 2003 Yan-nhaŋu Dictionary. This work expanded to over 4,000 forms in the Yan-nhaŋu Atlas and Illustrated Dictionary of the Crocodile Islands (2014). The work has also initiated a family of projects aimed at sustaining the linguistic, cultural and biological diversity of the Crocodile Islands. These include the Yan-nhangu Ecological Knowledge (YEK) and bilingual resources database for schools, CII Cultural mapping project, Crocodile Islands Rangers and junior rangers programs, an ethnographic description of Yan-nhangu marine identity, learner's guide, and an online dictionary project.

== Language and speakers ==
Yan-nhaŋu is a Yolŋu Matha (people's tongue) language belonging to the traditional owners of the seas and Islands of the Crocodile Group. Yan-nhaŋu is a Pama–Nyungan language family, the largest indigenous language family in Australia. The majority of Yan-nhaŋu speakers reside in and around Maningrida and Milingimbi communities, and surrounding outstations such as Murruŋga. The Yan-nhaŋu speaking Yolŋu people are the traditional owners of the land and sea of the Castlereagh Bay area.

=== History and Culture ===
Yan-nhangu people own an area of the Arafura sea and thirty one islands of just under 10,000 square kilometres (3,900 sq mi). Sometime after 1600 the annual arrival of Maccassan sailors harvesting trepang (bech de mer) changed the timings and patterns of Yan-nhangu people's seasonal movements around the Crocodile Islands. The arrival of the Methodist mission to the island of Milingimbi in 1922 attracted large numbers of eastern of kin to settle permanently on the Yan-nhaŋu estate.

Before colonization, the number of Yan-nhangu people remained small, just a few hundred, with no more than fifty or so people belonging to each of the six clans (ba:purru). The Yan-nhaŋu are a Yolŋu people with a distinctly marine orientation arising from intimate coexistence with their salt water country. The sea is a crucial aspect of Yan-nhaŋu society, religion and language. The ocean’s movements, sounds and changes are considered to be physical indexes of ancestral action. People share their names with the names of the ocean, its waves, colors, spirits, and winds. The six Yan-nhaŋu language types are distinctive and may be used to distinguish Yan-nhaŋu people from their neighbors.

The Yan-nhangu language, the sites and phenomena of their seas and islands are all understood to be the bequest of the creation ancestors. Yan-nhangu estates, religious identities and languages are ancestral endowments that form linkages of connection and difference throughout the networks of Yolngu society. Yan-nhangu clan identities, estates, language and ritual resources are passed down through patrilineal descent. Yan-nhangu people continue to perform the rich ritual, musical, dance and artistic practices shared by Yolngu kin throughout north-east Arnhem Land. More so they continue through ritual and practical actions to care for their marine environments.

=== Varieties ===
Within Yan-nhaŋu there exist six clan (bäpurru) based varieties, three of which are Dhuwa and three of which are Yirritja. The Dhuwa varieties spoken today are those of the Gamalaŋga, Gorryindi, and Mäḻarra groups. Yirritja Yan-nhangu speakers belong to the Bindarra, Ngurruwulu and Walamangu patri-groups of the Crocodile Islands.

== Phonology and alphabet ==
Yan-nhaŋu phonology is typical of Yolŋu languages, Pama–Nyungan languages, and Australian languages in general. There are six places of articulation with a stop and a nasal in each, as well as laterals, glides, and a trill. There is also a glottal phoneme and a three vowel system common in Australian languages.

=== Consonants ===
Yan-nhaŋu is written with six voiceless and six voiced stops. If a stop occurs word-initially it is written voiced, while word-final stops are written as voiceless. The two series contrast word medially, however (intervocalically and after laterals and nasals). Yan-nhaŋu does not contain any fricatives, which is common for Australian languages. Lamino-dental consonants do not occur at the end of a word, but are in general more common than their alveolar counterparts. All consonants are represented in the table below.

	Peripheral		Laminal		Apical		Glottal
	Bilabial	Velar	Palatal	Dental	Alveolar	Retroflex	Glottal
plosive	b ⟨p, b⟩	ɡ ⟨k, g⟩	ɟ ⟨tj, dj⟩	d̻ ⟨th, dh⟩	d ⟨t, d⟩	ɖ ⟨t̠, ḏ⟩	ʔ ⟨'⟩
nasal	m ⟨m⟩	ŋ ⟨ŋ⟩	ɲ ⟨ny⟩	n̻ ⟨nh⟩	n ⟨n⟩	ɳ ⟨n̠⟩	
trill					r ⟨rr⟩		
lateral					l ⟨l⟩	ɭ ⟨ḻ⟩	
approximant	w ⟨w⟩		j ⟨y⟩			ɻ ⟨r⟩	

=== Vowels ===
Yan-nhaŋu follows the typical three vowel system of Australian languages, with three short vowels, each with a long counterpart. Long vowels can only occur in the first syllable of a word. Stress is always given to the first syllable of a word, regardless of vowel length.

short	long
a ⟨a⟩	aː ⟨ä⟩
i ⟨i⟩	iː ⟨e⟩
u ⟨u⟩	uː ⟨o⟩

== Grammar ==
The most important parts of speech in Yan-nhaŋu are nouns and pronouns, verbs, adjectives, and particles.

=== Nouns and Pronouns ===
In Yan-nhaŋu, nominals (nouns and pronouns) often take case suffixes to denote their grammatical role in a sentence. While nouns and pronouns carry out similar functions within a sentence, they differ in how they are marked. Cases that are marked by suffixes are the ergative, absolutive, dative, allative, locative, associative, originative, animate oblique, perlative, human ablative, proprietive, privative, and ‘kinship proprietive’. A more detailed description of suffixes for nouns and pronouns is given in the morphology section.

==== Examples of nouns ====
- ratha 'baby', 'child'
- moḻ' 'snake'
- wuŋgan 'dog'
- waḻirr 'sun'
- guya 'fish'
- muru 'food'

==== Pronouns ====
Yan-nhaŋu pronouns exist for first, second, and third person in both singular and plural forms. In the plural form, a distinction is made between dual and plural (if there are just two people or if there are more than two people.) Additionally, the first person plurals differentiate between inclusive (including the listener) and exclusive (the listener is not included).

		singular	dual	plural
1st person	exclusive	ŋarra	ŋalinyu	napu
1st person	inclusive	ŋarra	ŋali	lima
2nd person		nhunu	nhuma	nyili
3rd person		nhani	balay	dhana

Like nouns, pronouns are subject to transformation through morphological suffixes. Also, the addition of the suffix –pi or -bi to a pronoun transforms the pronoun into its emphatic form, which may be used to stress that person’s involvement in the action of the sentence, or to differentiate him or her from the sentence’s other pronouns, if they are present.

=== Verbs ===
Yan-nhaŋu verbs denote action within the sentence. Their conjugation is somewhat unusual and does not follow the standard inflections to denote temporal change. Rather, there are four major forms (primary, secondary, tertiary, and quaternary), each of which is used to denote tense or mood. The primary is used to indicate the present or future tense as well as the ‘yesterday’ past, the secondary is used most often for commands or as a future/irrealis, the tertiary is used to show past actions, and the quaternary usually serves as the habitual or irrealis. The exact delineation of the conjugation classes of Yan-nhaŋu verbs is not definite, but there exist groups of verbs that can be classified on the basis of their conjugations. See verb morphology for a detailed explanation.

=== Particles ===
Particles are an essential component of Yan-nhaŋu verb conjugation. Added to a sentence before a verb in the primary, secondary, tertiary, or quaternary form, they provide additional information about tense or mood. For example, the continuous particle mana is used very frequently in combination with the primary verb form to show a present continuous action that approximates the present progressive. Other particles include:

- baḏak – with secondary, continuous imperative
- baka – with secondary, indicates future irrealis
- bäyŋu – with primary, present habitual
- bilagu - with secondary acts as future irrealis, with quaternary shows conditional irrealis
- gurrku - with primary, indicates future tense
- mananha - with tertiary, shows past continuous
- nhakali – with secondary, indicates ‘should’
- wanha - with tertiary, shows completion of an action

=== Adjectives ===
Yan-nhaŋu adjectives may come before or after a noun. They can but are not required to take the grammatical suffix of the noun that they modify. They may also be used as adverbs to modify verbs.

==== Examples of Adjectives ====
- yindi ‘big’
- miku ‘red’
- miriŋu ‘bad’
- dhunupa ‘straight’
- mulkuruŋu ‘foreign’
- buḻaŋgitj ‘good’

==== Example adjectival vs. adverbial sentences ====
Nhaŋu ratha miriŋu.
this child bad
'This child is bad.'

Ŋarra mana miriŋu waŋa Yan-nhaŋumurru
1sg CONT bad see-PRS Yan-nhaŋu-PER
'I speak Yan-nhaŋu badly.'

=== Syntax ===
==== Noun Morphology ====
Verb transitivity plays an important role in Yan-nhaŋu morphology. If a noun is the subject of a transitive sentence (meaning that the verb has an object) it receives the ergative suffix. The ergative suffix is also used as an instrumental marker to show that a noun is being used by the sentence subject to carry out the transitive action. The subject of an intransitive sentence takes no morpheme ending. Pronouns do not receive ergative suffixes and take no ending as the subject of a transitive sentence. Inanimate objects of transitive verbs do not take a suffix, while humans and many animals take the accusative ending, as do the pronouns representing them.

Morpheme suffixes are also used to mark dative nouns in Yan-nhaŋu sentences. The dative ending is also used to turn nouns into possessives and is also attached to objects of the verb djäl, ‘want’. The associative morpheme is used to show that something is ‘related to’ or ‘associated with’ a noun. The animate oblique is used only for human and animal nouns to mean ‘with’ or ‘at’ the animate noun. The locative morpheme signifies ‘at a location’ or ‘with’ or ‘on’ something, and the originative denotes that the subject of the clause is ‘from’ an object, which becomes the human ablative if the object is animate. The privative indicates ‘without,’ the allative ‘to’ or ‘towards,’ and the perlative ‘through’ or ‘along.’ A noun can be made into an adjective using the proprietive, with signifies ‘having.’ For example, ratha, ‘baby’ becomes rathaway, meaning ‘pregnant.’ In a similar way, adding the privative morpheme suffix, transforms a noun into an adjective showing ‘without.’ Finally, the ‘kinship proprietive’ is a noun suffix that is used to show familial relationships.

Morpheme suffix categories may have one or more allomorphs, which are given in the table below. The choice of allomorph for a particular word is determined by the final phoneme of the noun stem.

Morpheme Suffix	Allomorphs
Ergative/instrumental	-thu -yu or -dhu
Human/animate accusative	-nha
Dative	-ku, -gu
Associative	-bu
Animate Oblique	-kara, -gara
Locative	-ŋa, -la
Originative	-ŋuru
Human/animate ablative	-kuŋu, -guŋu
Allative	-li
Perlative	-murru
Proprietive	-way
Privative	-nharraŋu
‘Kinship proprietive’	-'mirriŋu

==== Verb Morphology ====
Conjugation of Yan-nhaŋu verbs can be predicted mostly by patterns in the primary forms of the verbs. The following table is a classification scheme of Yan-nhaŋu verbs and their conjugations in the primary, secondary, tertiary, and quaternary forms.

Class	Conjugations				English translation
Class	Primary	Secondary	Tertiary	Quaternary	English translation
1: verbs ending in -thun / -yun	gabatthun	gabatthu	gabatthana	gabatthala	run
2: verbs ending in -kuma / -yuma / -miyama	buma	buŋu	bunha	buwa	hit
2: verbs ending in -kuma / -yuma / -miyama	garama (Note: garama and wakalama are similar but slightly irregular)	garama	garanha	garawa	go
2: verbs ending in -kuma / -yuma / -miyama	wakalama	wakala	wakalanha	wakalawa	crawl
3: verbs ending in -tjirri / -yirri	yindiyirri	yindiyi	yindiyina	yindiyala	get big
3: verbs ending in -tjirri / -yirri	ŋätji	ŋätji	ŋätjina	ŋätjiyala	cry
4: verbs ending in -a	ŋorra	ŋorritji	ŋorrinha/ŋorrunha	ŋorriyala	sleep
4: verbs ending in -a	bamparra	bampirriyi	bamparranha	bampirriyala	stand
4: verbs ending in -a	waŋa	waŋayi	waŋanha	waŋayala	talk
5: verbs ending in -an / -aṉ	ŋupaṉ	ŋupa	ŋupaṉa	ŋupala	chase
5: verbs ending in -an / -aṉ	bathan	batha	bathana	bathayala	cook
6: No change (Macassan loan words)	djäma	djäma	djäma	djäma	work
Irregular	ben	biya	binha	birra	eat
Irregular	byena	nyiniyi	nyininha	nyininiyala	sit
Irregular	bhapiyan	nhapiya	nhapiyanha	nhapiyala	do what?
Irregular	bin(a)(munu)	biya	binha	biyamunu	do this

Adding one of the gerundial allomorphs –nara, -nhara, or –nara to the end of a verb in its tertiary form transforms the verb into a noun. Conversely, nouns may be transformed into verbs by the addition of one of the allomorphs –tjirri, -yirri, or –djirri, ‘become,’ or –kuma, -guma, or –yuma, ‘make.’

===== Examples of verb to noun transformations =====
wapthana → wapthananara
‘jump’ {} ‘jumping'

bamparra → bamparranhara
‘stand’ {} ‘standing’

===== Examples of noun to verb transformations =====
yindi → yindiyuma
‘big’ {} {‘to make big’}

buḻaŋgitj → buḻaŋgitjkuma
‘good’ {} {‘to make good’}

bambay → bambayyirri
‘blind’ {} {‘to become blind’}

borum → borumdjirri
‘ripe’ {} {‘to ripen’}

==== Reduplication ====
Reduplication of some Yan-nhaŋu verbs can be used to express intensification or the habitual or repeated nature of the action, a common feature of indigenous Australian languages. One of more of the verbs initial syllables may be repeated in this process and phonetic transformations may occur, depending on the verb in question.

===== Examples =====
gabatthun → gabagabatthun
‘run’ {} {‘keep running’}

dhurrguyun → durrgudhurrguyun
{‘shake something’} {} {‘shake something repeatedly/vigorously’}

bil’yun → bilyu’pilyun
‘turn’ {} {‘keep turning,’ ‘turn repeatedly’}

==== Word Order ====
Word order in Yan-nhaŋu is relatively free, that is, there are many ways to form a grammatical sentence by varying the order of the words therein. This is due to the morphology of the language, whereby the function of a word in a sentence is denoted by its suffix and not its position. While it is not the case that any arrangement of words will create a logical sentence, the following examples show the flexibility of word order in Yan-nhaŋu.

Nhapiyan nhunu gurrku?
{Do what} 2sg. FUT.PTCL
'What will you do?'

Alternatively: Nhunu gurrku nhapiyan?

Moḻ’yu dharrkthana rathanha
snake-ERG bite-PST baby-ACC
'The snake bit the baby.'

Alternatively: Rathanha dharrkthana moḻ’yu.

Nhaŋu gulkuruŋu wurrpaṉ.
This small emu
'This is a small emu.'

Alternatively: Gulkuruŋu wurrpaṉ nhaŋu,

Or: Wurrpaṉ gulkuruŋu nhaŋu.

== See also ==
- Yolŋu
- Yolŋu Matha
- Dual (grammatical number)
- Transitivity (grammatical category)
- Australian Aboriginal kinship
