= Djinba people =

The Djinba are an Aboriginal Australian group of the Yolngu people of the Northern Territory.

== Name ==
Their endonym Djinba comes from their word for the demonstrative pronoun "this". The two moieties are Ganalbingu (Ganhalpuyngu) and Mandjalpingu (Manydjalpuyngu).

== Language ==
Djinba is one of the Yolŋu languages, and its closest relationship is to Djinang with which it is about 60% cognate.

== Country ==
The Djinba were inlanders whose territory has been estimated to extend over some 1,200 square miles (3,100 km^{2}), running south from the Arafura Swamp's northern margin to the upper Goyder River. The Djinang lie to their north-west, the Rembarrnga directly west, while to their south were the Ngandi and Diakui people (Ritharrngu) tribes.

== Social organisation ==
Norman Tindale claimed that the Djinba were the most northerly tribe in eastern Arnhem Land to retain the standard Australian tribal structure, meaning they were divided into Dua and Jiritja clans.

== Alternative names ==
- Jinba
- Outjanbah

== Notable people ==
- David Gulpilil

== Sources ==
- Keen, Ian (August 1995). "Metaphor and the Metalanguage: "Groups" in Northeast Arnhem Land". American Ethnologist. 22 (3): 502–527. doi:10.1525/ae.1995.22.3.02a00030. JSTOR 645969.
- Thomson, Donald F. (August 1939). "The Tree Dwellers of the Arafura Swamps: A New Type of Bark Canoe from CentralArnhem Land". Man. 39: 121–126. doi:10.2307/2793391. JSTOR 2793391.
- Tindale, Norman Barnett (1974). "Djinba (NT)". Aboriginal Tribes of Australia: Their Terrain, Environmental Controls, Distribution, Limits, and Proper Names. Australian National University. ISBN 978-0-708-10741-6. Archived from the original on 20 March 2020.
- Warner, William Lloyd (April 1930). "Morphology and Functions of the Australian Murngin Type of Kinship". American Anthropologist. 32 (2): 207–256. doi:10.1525/aa.1930.32.2.02a00010. JSTOR 661305.
- Warner, William Lloyd (April–June 1931). "Morphology and Functions of the Australian Murngin Type of Kinship (Part II)". American Anthropologist. 33 (2): 172–198. doi:10.1525/aa.1931.33.2.02a00030. JSTOR 660835.
- Waters, Bruce E. (1989). Djinang and Djinba - A Grammatical and Historical Perspective (PDF). Research School of Pacific Studies. ISBN 085883-392-1.
