= Djambu Barra Barra =

Indigenous Australian artist

- Born: circa 1946; Nilipidgi, Northern Territory, Australia
- Died: 2005 (aged 58–59); Ngukurr, Northern Territory, Australia
- Other names: Sambo Burra Burra, Sambo Barra Barra, Djambu Burra Burra
- Spouse: Amy Jirwulurr Johnson
- Relatives: Wally Wilfred (grandson)

Djambu Barra Barra (also known as Sambo Barra Barra) (1946–2005) was an Indigenous Australian artist based in Ngukurr, in the Northern Territory of Australia. Ngukurr is considered an artistically significant community with many diverse styles and artists, including Barra Barra. He is known for his brightly colored acrylic paintings depicting mainly Yirritja ancestral stories, including the Burdal Plains Kangaroo, the Guyal Sand Goanna, crocodiles, and the Devil Devil (Nagaran).

== Early life ==
Djambu Barra Barra (Dhuwa) was born around 1946 in Wagilak country near Nilipidgi on the Walker River. He was raised in the Wagilak community without communication or contact with Europeans, a unique upbringing compared to other artists from Ngukurr, a Northern Territory in Australia.

After his father (Wagilak) and his mother (Ritharrngu), along with the rest of his family, died, Barra Barra left Wagilak and traveled along Dreaming paths throughout Arnhem Land, following major ritual paths. He actively sought out knowledge about his own and other clans' rituals, ceremonies, and stories, particularly those in Central and Western Arnhem Land. This allowed him to gain experience in bark and ceremonial body painting, and techniques from both of these regions, like the use of the 'X-Ray' style, rarrk (sacred crosshatching), and large figures that occupy the frame, can be seen in his artwork.

In the 1960s, Barra Barra traveled back to the eastern side of Arnhem Land and lived in Ngukurr until the mid-1970s, moving to the Costello outstation after marrying Amy Johnson, who would also become a painter. Ngukurr originated from an Anglian mission by the Victorian Church Missionary Society in 1908. It was officially known as the Roper River Mission and focused on establishing industrial, agricultural, educational, and spiritual Christian foundations in the community. CMS was meant to serve in part as a refuge for the Aboriginal population in the wake of the Frontier War, a series of violent altercations between settler cattle farmers and indigenous populations. While the mission provided stable housing and meals, as well as English classes for children and taught agricultural technical skills, its purpose was also to siphon out Aboriginal traditions in favor of instilling a more European way of life out of sympathy. Because of the prevalence of the cattle industry and the mission, Ngukurr drew people from across Arnhem Land and became a place of flux for indigenous populations. This lack of cohesion set the context for the non-homogeneous artwork that would emerge from the region later on. The years following the end of the Australian Assimilation policy (1963) saw the slow decline of the mission, and in 1968, the Welfare Branch of the Northern Territory assumed control of the settlement, transitioning to the Ngukurr Town Council in 1973.

During his time in Ngukurr, Barra Barra adjusted to the semi-moiety system in place, which was a unique feature of Roper culture. Aboriginal Australian cultures assign natural objects (including plants, animals, and people) one of two Moieties: Dhuwa or Yirritja. This ancestry is traditionally passed down paternally, and can dictate the types of ceremonies, sacred clan designs, and spousal marriages that one can commit to and execute. Roper traditionally enforced semi-moieties, which determined specific ceremonies and designs that one could partake in, so Barra Barra's Yolngu ancestry was further classified as being of Dhuwa moiety with a Mambi subsection and Wamut skin group. After moving back to Ngukurr in the 1980s, Barra Barra integrated himself into the Ngukurr community through his extensive knowledge of Aboriginal ceremonies and culture, and was respected as a ceremony man. This was aided by his travels as a young man, and Barra Barra eventually became Ngukurr's initiation and funeral director, aided in part by his Wagilak upbringing, which participated in purification ceremonies during funerals in Ngukurr. However, because of his lack of land ownership, Barra Barra did not hold any political power within Ngukurr, despite his ceremonial duties and respect from the community.

== Context: Roper River and Ngukurr artistic community ==
Ngukurr Arts is the collaborative art community that formed at Roper River. The art community was formed as a way of integrating the number of Aboriginal cultures present in the area. The community is known for its cohesion of various artists, who come together as a group based on their passion for innovation. The artists all use bright, striking colours in their works. This dynamic style makes it hard to define Ngukurr Arts in any specific way as the Roper River artists strive to differentiate themselves from previously established Aboriginal tradition. Despite these differences, Ngukurr Art provided the artists with a workspace as well as a community for collaboration. This social network allowed many artists to then rise to fame in the global art market.

The Ngukurr Arts Initiative organized field trips to other art centers, secured continuous fundraising for artists, organized exhibitions, and taught principles of distribution, marketing, and management. Ngukurr Arts has been in long time conversation with Anthony and Beverly Knight, directors of the Alcaston Gallery in Melbourne. The Knights especially enjoyed Ginger Riley's works, and purchased them all. Many of these works are now featured in the National Gallery of Victoria. This level of investment and interaction helped to gain publicity for the Roper River artists in the Western art markets.

=== Roper River artists ===
Some other artists include Ginger Riley, Manduwalawala Willie Gudabi, Moima Willie, Gertie Huddleston and Amy Jirwulurr Johnson.

== Ngukurr arts and artistic career ==
In 1987, Barra Barra, along with other artists such as Ginger Riley Manduwalawala, took part in a screen printing workshop through the Ngukurr Adult Education Committee. The committee was the result of a Northern Territory Open College initiative that implemented oral history and bush medicine, and was headed by Brian Burkett and Gale Duell starting in 1985. Burkett and Duell traveled with a select group of artists from Ngukurr to Yuemdumu in the desert to learn more about the economic benefits of artistic creation. This inspired many artists to become more involved in artistic pursuits. Edie Kurzer, who initially oversaw a screen printing course from 1986 - 1987, began teaching T-shirt stencil methods, and the screen print workshops became social events for the community. However, Kurzer noticed that the workshop was expensive and not generating enough money to be sustainable, and several men like Willie Gudabi sought another medium to dabble in, potentially for cultural significance. John Nelson, who succeeded Kurzer, created a paint workshop targeted towards men who were interested in 1987. Nelson noticed that Barra Barra and Riley were quick and eager to paint, choosing brightly coloured and highly saturated screen printing ink and lawn curtain material.

Barra Barra began using acrylics on canvas and searched for his own style. In Ngukurr, drawing and painting were seen as forms of sorcery, and specific clan designs could not be referenced in order to maintain their secrecy. This forced Barra Barra and Ginger Riley to examine different solutions to this problem, and while Riley's stylistic evolution was more gradual, Barra Barra was quickly able to utilize techniques from his Yolngu heritage and his time traveling in Western and Central Arnhem Land.

Barra Barra, along with other Ngukurr artists, made their public debut at the 4th National Aboriginal & Torres Strait Islander Art Awards (NATSIAA) held at the Museum and Art Gallery of the Northern Territory. The Ngukurr artists' use of brightly coloured acrylics on canvas, along with their variation in styles and lack of cohesion between artists, made them prominent features, creating a large press coverage and gaining popularity with multiple galleries. Barra Barra's early work, Crocodile Story (1987), featured a crooked canvas shape due to a portion of a foot and tail extending outside of the frame. About the work, Barra Barra said, "The crocodile has creative thoughts, like humans. He knows how heavy the floods will be. He builds a very clever nest. His eyes are no longer eyes. They are fire". The painting, which depicts a crocodile surrounded by fish carrying a man to eat, demonstrates Barra Barra's use of "public" versions of ancestral stories, as the crocodile story's true meaning can only be known to certain trained men. The painting, featuring his signature complementary colour pallet, was extremely meaningful to him, and Barra Barra requested that such a painting was to be buried with him. However, many of the paintings made by Ngukurr artists were made exclusively for galleries, and few of them could be returned to their owners.

During this time, Barra Barra began to work with his wife, Amy Jirwulurr Johnson, and collaborated with her for nearly 20 years. She used similar bold contrasting colours as her husband, with a focus on primary colours and usually depicting animals and plants with meticulous detail. Their work shared some motifs and stylistic trends, although Amy Johnson's work presents portrays animals from her mother's country rather than the ancestral figures and totems found in her husband's work. She and Barra Barra were part of numerous group exhibitions at the Alcaston Gallery in Melbourne from 1989 to 1997, curated and represented by Beverly Knight of the Knight family, notable supporters of Ngukurr artists. This provided some relief from the slow fade of Ngukurr art and the departure of many members from the Ngkurr Adult Education Committee.

== Artistic style and figures ==
Barra Barra was best known for his use of bright, bold colours, and traditional designs, even being recorded asking for "fluoro colours" in 1987. He utilized primary and complementary colours to emphasize contrast between figures and background designs, often with even, thick brush strokes and outlines. He was also able to render rarrk—a traditional cross-hatching design—in acrylic paint, one of the only artists to successfully do so. Barra Barra also utilized dots in his designs, though his "rarrk-on-rarrk" work is the most well known. These designs, combined with the alternating contrasting colours, created a vibrating background that was meant to invoke awe and an overwhelming emotional response from viewers. His compositions were typically dense and dominated by large figurative forms, similar to those found in Western and Central Arnhem Land. This was different than his fellow Ngukurr artists, who drew figurative works as part of much larger landscapes or depicted many ancestral beings in their pieces. Barra Barra chose instead to focus on specific ancestral beings and stories, and figures were limited to only a few per piece. These figure heavy pieces were usually central and symmetrical in composition, and Barra Barra employed rhythm in his backgrounds and textural differences to draw attention to the chosen figures. Much of his artwork also utilized the X-ray style of the Western Arnhem Land rock art tradition, where internal organs are displayed, though Barra Barra's depiction of these organs vary depending on the piece.

Barra Barra depicted most of his central figures from his Yirritja heritage, which originated from his mother's side. Yolngu art can be generally divided into two representational groups: figurative and geometric. The figurative system consists of iconically motivated images, where there is a similarity between the signifier and the signified. Many of his paintings are in the figurative tradition, and feature ancestral beings and mortuary scenes, as well as iterations of both his and his mother's Dreamings, like the Plains Kangaroo, the crocodile, and the Guyal Sandridge Goanna. Barra Barra often altered the design of such beings to convey symbolic messages, like depicting kangaroo figure as having large feet to show their ability to travel long distances. Many of Barra Barra's paintings involved themes of death and rebirth, such as those featuring the Guyal Sandridge Goanna. Additionally, Barra Barra's paintings were based on Yirritja ceremonies. Some of his most famous works, depicting the Devil Devil (Nagaran), an evil sorcerer or magic man, were drawn directly from the Yaboduruwa ceremony. The Devil Devil is one of the most iconic and recognizable figures in Barra Barra's art, as noted by his pounce position, dilly bags, and his six-fingered left hand. This further emphasized Barra Barra's choice to capture his figures in motion.

== Legacy ==
Barra Barra died on 13 December 2005, after being hit by a rock following a family altercation. As one of the first key artists of what is now Ngukurr Art Centre, Djambu Barra Barra, along with Ginger Riley Manduwalawala, Willie Gudabi, and Amy Johnson, helped set a precedent for what Ngukurr artists could achieve. The success and recognition of Barra Barra and initial encouragement of the Ngukurr Adult Education Committee lay the foundation for other prominent artists like Angelina George and Wally Wilfred. Today, Ngukurr Arts Centre continues the legacy left by the Ngukurr Adult Education Committee and past artists through its Ngukurr Story Project, an oral history project that serves as a digital archive for Ngukurr residents, and an online shop selling prints, paintings, sculptures, and other objects.

== Works ==
Notable works
Title	Year	Medium	Dimensions	Location	Description
Untitled	1987	Synthetic polymer paint on canvas	155 x 122 cm		One of the first paintings ever done by Barra Barra. The painting is split in half, with one side being an abstract compilation of cross-hatching, while the other is a collection of Aboriginal motifs that Barra Barra refers to as his family.
Devil Devil Men	1987	Acrylic on canvas			Innovative depiction of dead mokuy and an elaborate, grand funerary scene.
Crocodile Story	1987	Acrylic on canvas	256 x 169 cm	The Holmes à Court Collection	This work was exhibited at the 4th National Aboriginal and Torres Strait Islander Art Awards in 1987.
Songs for Ceremony	1993		177 x 109.5 cm		
Cyprus Pine	1995	Synthetic polymer paint on canvas	295 x 130 cm	Museum and Art Gallery of the Northern Territory Collection	A monumental canvas depicting a large tree with bare limbs decorated with bands of yellow and blue. It demonstrates the duality of the tree, both as a living thing and ceremonial post
Crocodile Men's Stories	1996		191 x 181 cm		Depicts a scene of a crocodile next to the dead body of a boy it has killed. Showcases Barra Barra's skill of innovative crosshatching and depiction of animal bodies and spirits.
Medicine Man	1998		120 x 240 cm		Mokuy surrounded by a pile of bones. Barra Barra uses bright, contrasting colours to create a feeling of power to be associated with death.
Sans titre	2000		135 x 128 cm		
Devil Devil	2004		125 x 75 cm		
Dead Ones	2005		295 x 130 cm		Shows a funerary scene and ceremony connecting the deaths of a family of mokuy. Barra Barra's use of bright colours depicts the theme more positively despite traditionally negative connotations surrounding death. He makes it out to be a connecting process rather than a divisive one. This work was entered in the 2005 National Aboriginal and Torres Strait Islander Art Awards.

== Collections ==
- National Gallery of Australia
- National Gallery of Victoria
- University of Wollongong
- Kluge-Ruhe Aboriginal Art Collection of the University of Virginia

== Significant exhibitions ==
- 1987: National Aboriginal and Torres Strait Islander Art Award, Darwin
- 1987: Beat Strit – 10 years on, Melbourne
- 1989-1987: group shows at Alcaston Gallery (endorsed by Beverly Knight), Melbourne
- 1992: group show at Christine Abrahams Gallery (through Alcaston House), Melbourne
- 1992, 1995, 1996: group shows at Hogarth Gallery (through Alcaston House), Sydney
- 1994: group show at Gallerie Australis (through Alcaston House), Adelaide
- 1998: Devil Devil. Alcaston Gallery, Melbourne
- 1999: Daily Life in Ngukurr: Sambo Barra Barra and Amy Johnson. Rebecca Hosack Art Gallery, London.
- 2004-5: Colour Power: Aboriginal Art Post 1984. National Gallery of Victoria, Melbourne.
- 2009-2010: Colour Country: Art from the Roper River. Wagga Wagga Art Gallery, Wagga Wagga; Flinders University Art Museum, Adelaide; Drill Hall Gallery, Australian National University, Canberra; Museum and Art Gallery of the Northern Territory, Darwin.
