= Ritharrngu =

Aboriginal Australian people

The Ritharrngu (Ritharrŋu, Ritharngu) and also known as the Diakui (and variant spellings), are an Aboriginal Australian people of Arnhem Land in the Northern Territory, of the Yolŋu group of peoples. Their clans are Wagilak and Manggura (of the Dhuwa moiety), and Ritharrŋu (of the Yirritja moiety).

== Language ==
The Ritharrŋu language is a Yolŋu Matha language. In modern times Ritharrŋu has been observed to be undergoing significant structural changes away from Yolŋu, with innovations in its morphosyntaxis through assimilation of features characteristic of Nunggubuyu and Ŋandi.

== Country ==
The Ritharrŋu are estimated to have landed estates extending over approximately 2,200 square miles (5,700 km^{2}) east and south of the Arafura Swamp. They also inhabit the area east of the Goyder River, whose tributaries' headwaters form their southernmost frontier. They also inhabit the area around the Mitchell Ranges and the Koolatong River headwaters.

Wagilak are amongst the clans living at Ŋukurr (formerly Roper River Mission).

== Social organisation ==
The Ritharrŋu are organised into three clans, two pertaining to the Dhuwa moiety and one to the Yirritja moiety of the Yolŋu people.

Dhuwa moieties

- Wagilak (Wagelag, Wawilak, Waurilak, Nunydjulpi, Nundjulpi, Nundjulbi)
- Manggura (Manggurra)

Yirritja moiety

- Ritarngu (Ritarungo, Ritharrngu, Ridarngo, Ritaringo, Rittarungo, Ritharingau, Ridarngu, Buranadjini)

== Alternative names ==
- Dhiyakuy
- Dijogoi
- Djikai, Jikai, Tchikai

Source: Tindale 1974, p. 223

== Notable people ==
At Ŋukurr:

- Artist Djambu "Sambo" Burra Burra (born c.1946)
- Artist Amy Jirwulurr Johnson (wife of Burra Burra)

== Sources ==
- "Djambu Barra Barra Paintings". Japingka Aboriginal Art Gallery. 19 July 2014.
- Hall, Vic (1962). Dreamtime Justice. Adelaide: Rigby.
- Heine, Bernd; Kuteva, Tania (2005). Language Contact and Grammatical Change. Cambridge University Press. ISBN 978-0-521-60828-2.
- Power, Lisa (30 July 2010). "Crossing the divide". The Sydney Morning Herald.
- "Sambo Burra Burra Artist". personally-selected-aboriginal-art.com. 2010.
- Thomson, Donald F. (August 1939). "The Tree Dwellers of the Arafura Swamps: A New Type of Bark Canoe from Central Arnhem Land". Man. 39: 121–126. doi:10.2307/2793391. JSTOR 2793391.
- Tindale, Norman (1925). "Natives of Groote Eylandt and the west coast of the Gulf of Carpentaria, Part I". Records of the South Australian Museum. 3: 61–102.
- Tindale, Norman Barnett (1974). "Diakui (NT)". Aboriginal Tribes of Australia: Their Terrain, Environmental Controls, Distribution, Limits, and Proper Names. Australian National University.
- Warner, William Lloyd (April 1930). "Morphology and Functions of the Australian Murngin Type of Kinship". American Anthropologist. 32 (2): 207–256. doi:10.1525/aa.1930.32.2.02a00010. JSTOR 661305.
- Warner, William Lloyd (April–June 1931). "Morphology and Functions of the Australian Murngin Type of Kinship (Part II)". American Anthropologist. 33 (2): 172–198. doi:10.1525/aa.1931.33.2.02a00030. JSTOR 660835.
