= Djinang =

Djinang may refer to:

- Djinang language, and Australian Aboriginal language
- Djinang people, a sub-group of the Yolngu people of Australia
