= Djinba =

Djinba may refer to:

- Djinba people
- Djinba language
