= Nunggubuyu =

Nunggubuyu may refer to:

- Nunggubuyu people
- Nunggubuyu language
