= Goyder River =

River in the Northern Territory of Australia

Goyder
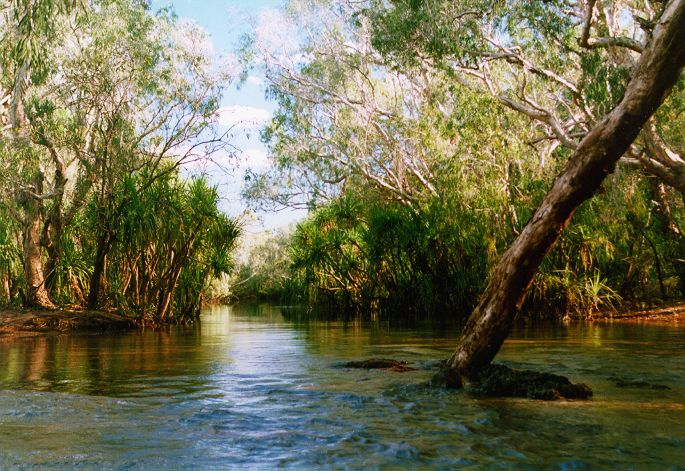
- Goyder River Crossing

- Location of the Goyder River mouth in the Northern Territory
- Etymology: George Goyder

Location
- Country: Australia
- Territory: Northern Territory

Physical characteristics
- Source: Mitchell Ranges
  - location: Arnhem Land, Australia
  - elevation: 63 m (207 ft)
- Mouth: Glyde river
  - location: Arnhem Land, Australia
  - coordinates: 12°28′58″S 134°57′58″E
  - elevation: 1 m (3 ft 3 in)
- Length: 171 km (106 mi)
- Basin size: 10,391 km^{2} (4,012 sq mi)
- Discharge
  - average: 25 m^{3}/s (880 cu ft/s)
  - minimum: 0.001 m^{3}/s (0.035 cu ft/s)
  - maximum: 1,413 m^{3}/s (49,900 cu ft/s)

Basin features
- Tributaries
  - left: Annie Creek
  - right: Sheridan Creek, Gulbuwangay River

The Goyder River is a river in the Northern Territory of Australia.

== Description ==
The headwaters of the river rise at the base of the Mitchell Ranges and are fed by spring discharge from an extensive dolomite aquifer that supports areas of rainforest along the banks. The river then flows north west before crossing the Central Arnhem Road then veering north and later forming multiple braided channels and feeding the Arafura Swamp before eventually discharging into the Glyde River which in turn empties into Castlereagh Bay and the Arafura Sea.

The swamp area occupies an area of 700 square kilometres (270 sq mi) in the dry season and is of great cultural significance to the Yolngu people, in particular the Ramingining community, which is located on the edge of the swamp.

The river catchment occupies an area of 10,391 square kilometres (4,012 sq mi) and is wedged between the Blyth River catchment to the west, the Walker and Roper River catchments to the south, and the Buckingham and Koolatong River catchments to the east.

Three tributaries discharge into the Goyder; Annie Creek, Sheridan Creek and the Gulbuwangay River.

The Goyder has a mean average discharge of 788,940 megalitres (1.032×10^{9} cu yd) with a maximum flow of 1,413 cubic metres (49,900 cu ft) per second and a minimum flow of 1,830 litres (483 US gal) per second. It is the ninth largest river system in the Northern Territory but has the second highest end of dry season flow-rate.

== Fauna ==
A range of fauna are found in the river, there are 39 species of fish including Macleay's glassfish, barred grunter, fly-specked hardyhead, freshwater sole, golden goby, northern trout gudgeon, Gulf saratoga, barramundi, oxeye herring, rainbowfish, black-banded rainbowfish, bony bream, salmon catfish, Berney's catfish, freshwater longtom, seven-spot archerfish and the sleepy cod.

== History ==
The traditional owners of the area are the Dalabon, Daikui and Djinba peoples, who have inhabited the area for thousands of years.

Thought to have been named in 1868 by Captain Francis Cadell during his expedition on HMS Firefly, the river is named for George Goyder, the Surveyor General of South Australia.

The explorer, David Lindsay, named the Glyde Inlet in 1883 while on expedition in Arnhem Land.

The MacCartney family started the Florida cattle station in the 1880s, but after constant clashes with local Aboriginal peoples the station was abandoned in 1893. The Arafura cattle station was established in 1903 by the Eastern, African and Cold Store Company on the 50,000-square-kilometre (19,305 sq mi) lease along the Goyder and Glyde Rivers. Joseph Bradshaw overlanded 5,000 cattle to stock the station from further south but five years later the station was abandoned also.

== See also ==
- List of rivers of Australia § Northern Territory
