= Amy Jirwulurr Johnson =

Indigenous Australian Artist

- Born: 1952
- Died: 2016 (aged 63–64)
- Spouse: Djambu Barra Barra
- Awards: 1993, Museums and Galleries Award, National Aboriginal and Torres Strait Islander Art Awards

Amy Jirwulurr Johnson (1953–2016) was an Aboriginal Australian artist of the Ritharrngu and Ngalakgan peoples of the Northern Territory of Australia. Along with her husband Djambu Barra Barra, Johnson was one of the first painters at Ngukurr Arts Aboriginal Corporation. Johnson is best known for her bright acrylic paintings on canvas, but she also worked in silkscreen prints, lithography, etchings, and natural pigments on canvas. Her works are held in numerous important public collections, including the National Gallery of Australia, the National Gallery of Victoria, and the University of Wollongong Collection. Johnson was awarded the 1993 Museums and Art Galleries Award at the National Aboriginal and Torres Strait Islander Art Awards.

== Early life and family ==
Amy Jirwulurr Johnson was born in 1953 at the Roper Valley Station where her father, Charlie Johnson, was working. He was a Rembarrnga man whose country was Makalawa, and he married Amy's mother, Jessica Johnson, a Ngalakgan woman from Duck Creek (Jilkmillikan). Johnson grew up attending a primary school at the Roper Valley Station before their family moved to Roper Bar where her father had gotten a job at the police station, and her mother at an office. There, she attended Urapunga School, where she claims to have been good at painting and drawing. In the late 1960s, the family moved again to Ngukurr around the same time the community was switching from Mission control to community control. Amy attended the Ngukurr School and was encouraged by a teacher to paint and draw in addition to her other woman-focused education of learning to cook and sew. She continued this work in Ngukurr after finishing school until going to Darwin for a short time and pursuing further studies at the Open College.

Upon her return to Ngukurr, she married artist Djambu Barra Barra at the Ngukurr Church in the mid-1970s, but retained her father's name. Before having children, they spent some time at the Costello Outstation, a location that her mother lived in for an extended period of time and had ties to. She had three children – Helen, Gerald, and Carl – who have since given her multiple grandchildren. The family moved between Ngukurr and Costello multiple times over the next decade until Johnson's mother passed around 1990, when they decided to stay in Costello a few more years.

Johnson learned about culture primarily from her mother and her husband. Her mother lived in Costello for an extended period of time, including the old Mission days when she only liked visiting the mission to buy food. Her mother told her stories about her travels around Arnhem Land, such as walking to Bulman, Burrungu, and along the Roper River. Johnson enjoyed spending time in the bush, and she and her husband retained their connection to it throughout their lives. She liked to live off bush tucker, and she and her husband enjoyed hunting and fishing in their free time.

== Career ==
Amy Jirwulurr Johnson's artistic career is one that developed and changed over time, beginning with learning to paint under her husband's guidance, essentially mirroring his work. They were in Ngukurr when the first painting workshops began in 1987, and they collaborated on many paintings between 1987–1998. These primarily focused on versions of a type of mortuary painting that is common across many parts of Arnhem Land. These can be characterized by wading birds hunting for fish, suggesting the spiritual and literal abundance of life in their country. From 1989–1997, they were collectively represented by Beverly Knight at the Alcaston Gallery in Melbourne. They were mostly represented in group shows, including exhibitions in 1989, 1990, 1993, and 1997. They also participated in group shows at other galleries, including the Hogarth Gallery in Sydney in 1992, 1995, and 1996, the Christine Abrahams Gallery in Melbourne in 1992, and the Gallerie Australis in Adelaide in 1994. Amy also exhibited in a number of exhibitions early in her career. This includes representation 1991 shows, including Aboriginal Art & Spirituality at the High Court Canberra, the Aboriginal Women's Exhibition, which travelled to a number of locations around Australia, and Ngundungunya: Art for Everyone at the National Gallery of Victoria. In 1993, she exhibited in Darwin at the Framed Gallery, which then facilitated an exhibition for works by her and her husband at the Rebecca Hossack Gallery in London in 1999. Also in 1993, she won the Museums and Art Galleries award for best painting in the Open Media category of the National Aboriginal Art Awards. In 1998, she and her husband began painting for the newly founded Ngukurr Art Centre, and she was frequently selected for entry into the National Aboriginal and Torres Strait Islander Art Awards (NATSIAA). At Ngukurr Art Centre, she was considered one of the "older artists" that were regulars at the centre, often painting at green plastic tables and exchanging comments about their work.

Her artistic divergence from her husband and her personal stylistic development is especially noticeable in her 1995 painting titled Women Fishing, which was entered the NATSIAA that year. This is one of the first paintings in which Amy includes human figures in the environment, depicted in the form of women going hunting and fishing. This painting follows a different symmetry from her earlier works, utilizing organic shapes that appear to mirror each other. This painting also includes a complex sky composition of clouds and birds, which would continue to be used in many of her later works. This work has since been acquired by the Museum and Art Gallery of the Northern Territory.

Another period of her artistic career began around 2002, when she began producing works with exceptional complexity, referring to them as her "landscape paintings." During this period, she confirmed that she was now fully artistically separate from her husband and presented herself as an autonomous artist. She spent time elaborating on previous tendencies in her earlier work, creating a distinct and personal style that featured a greater density of flora and fauna, activity and movement, and more complexities in composition, detail, and color palette. This made her representation of her experience and memories of her country much more personal.

== Iconography and themes ==
Amy Jirwulurr Johnson uses a multitude of stylistic diversities to paint variations of the same set of themes and iconographies. She primarily paints in the figurative tradition, creating the flora and fauna associated with her mother's country against a background of an environment, or simply collecting and arranging them against a minimal background of solid color. She focuses on her surroundings, painting the daily events of her country at Ngukurr. Her early paintings are compilations of species that are significant to her, which she calls the "culture ones," and the Yolngu people call Garma. These are paintings of totemic species that the artist is permitted to paint for public viewing, which is essentially their outside or mundane meanings. Represented animals include the short-necked turtle, the water goanna, the whistling duck, other larger water birds, and the pelican, which is her totem. She has also painted wallabies, two types of snakes, and multiple species of fish, including the black beam and the comb fish.

The narratives of the animals she paints are often relevant to the search for suitable sites to perform the initiation rituals for young boys. Unlike her husband, she doesn't portray major ancestral figures performing ceremonies, and she does not use cross-hatching or other sacred patterning that is associated with bark painting.

Generally, Johnson's paintings progressed in complexity throughout her career. Her compositions increased in decorative patterning and her environments became more detailed, with her later works blending animals into the complexity of the country in which they are depicted. She has painted many canvases that have animals and fish arranged over geometric shapes, and infills of dots or other patterning filling the background. She uses a variety of color palettes, from simple blocks of primary colors to complex arrangements of many colors, but she generally prefers bold, saturated colors that make her paintings more vibrant. She often uses flat, organic shapes in her backgrounds to suggest topographical regions of country. Her figures are often depicted performing actions, and can be depicted in sparse or dense groupings. Overall, her style is diverse, innovative, and unformulaic. Analyzing her paintings chronologically, Johnson challenges the previous notions of Aboriginal landscape paintings, "authenticity," and gender in the Aboriginal art world.

== Collections ==
- Museum and Art Gallery of the Northern Territory, Darwin
- National Gallery of Australia, Canberra
- National Gallery of Victoria, Melbourne
- University of Wollongong Collection, Wollongong.
