= Milingimbi Islands Important Bird Area =

Coordinates: 12°03′44″S 134°54′04″E

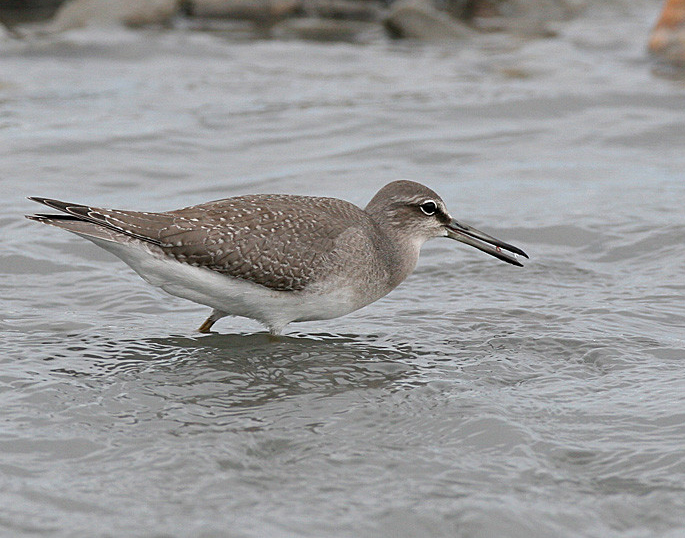
The IBA is an important site for grey-tailed tattlers

The Milingimbi Islands Important Bird Area comprises 94 km^{2} of land in the Milingimbi, or Crocodile Islands group, of the Northern Territory of Australia. The area is traditionally owned Aboriginal land. The mudflats are an important staging site for migratory waders, or shorebirds.

== Description ==
The islands lie close to the northern coast of Arnhem Land in Castlereagh Bay, not far from the mouth of the Glyde River. The IBA includes the small islands of Darbada, Yabooma, Crocodile, Gananggarngur and Mooroongga, as well as the coastal fringe of Milingimbi Island, and consists mainly of intertidal mudflats with fringing mangroves, saltmarsh and chenopod shrubland, with sandy beaches and dunes on exposed shores.

== Birds ==
The land so described has been identified by BirdLife International as an Important Bird Area (IBA) because it supports over 1% of the world populations of grey-tailed tattlers and pied oystercatchers, and large numbers of eastern curlews and great knots. Other birds recorded on the islands in large numbers include radjah shelducks, Terek sandpipers, bar-tailed godwits and common terns. chestnut rails are present on the islands.
