= Koolatong River =

River in the Northern Territory, Australia

Koolatong
- Location of the Koolatong River mouth in the Northern Territory

Location
- Country: Australia
- Territory: Northern Territory

Physical characteristics
- Source: Mitchell Ranges
  - location: Arnhem Land, Australia
- Mouth
  - location: Australia
  - coordinates: 13°12′37″S 135°55′26″E
  - elevation: 0 m (0 ft)
- Length: 92 km (57 mi)
- Basin size: 7,913 km^{2} (3,055 sq mi)
- Discharge
  - average: 25.4 m^{3}/s (900 cu ft/s)

The Koolatong River is a river in the Northern Territory, Australia.

Rising in the Mitchell Ranges the river initially flows north then turns east across the uninhabited plains eventually discharging into the Saint Nicholas Inlet and the Blue Mud Bay then into the Gulf of Carpentaria.

The catchment occupies an area of 7,913 square kilometres (3,055 sq mi) and is situated between the Buckingham River catchment to the north, the Walker River catchment to the south and the Goyder River catchment to the west. The river has a mean annual outflow of 800 gigalitres (1.046×10^{9} cu yd).

The estuary formed at the river mouth is in near pristine condition. The estuary occupies an area of 23.7 hectares (59 acres) of open water. It is river dominated in nature with a tide dominated delta having a single channel and is surrounded by an area of 51.3 hectares (127 acres) covered with mangroves.

The traditional owners of the area are the Murngin, also known as the Yolngu peoples.

== See also ==
- List of rivers of Australia § Northern Territory
