= Yan-nhaŋu =

Indigenous Australians of the Northern Territory,

The Yan-nhaŋu, also known as the Nango, are an indigenous Australian people of the Northern Territory. They have strong sociocultural connections with their neighbours, the Burarra, on the Australian mainland.

== Name ==
The Yan-nhaŋu people derive their ethnonym from the language they spoke, yän meaning 'tongue/speech' and nhaŋu a proximate deictic word signifying 'this'.

== Language ==
Yan-nhangu is a member of the Yolŋu language family.

== Country ==
In his classic survey of Australian tribes, Norman Tindale assigned their modern territory to the Djinang people. He writes that the Yan-nhaŋu (Nango) were indigenous to the Wessel Islands east of Brown Strait (from Jirrgari island to Cape Wessel), Galiwin'ku/Elcho Island (Note: The vocabulary of the Elcho Island community registered by Jennison in 1927 was however Dhuwal.) and Drysdale Island. Their territory also encompassed the Cunningham Islands. With regard to the Crocodile Islands group, Tindale designated Mooroonga and Yabooma as Yan-nhaŋu, adding that they were also present at Banyan Island, where the Woolen River debouches.

== Traditional social organization ==
The Yan-nhaŋu were formed of eight clans, belonging to either a Dua or Yirritja moiety:

Dua moieties (5 clans)

- 1. Bararparar (Bararrpararr)
- 2. Bararngu (Bararrngu, Barangu, Perango)
- 3. Jan:angu (Note: Variously named '(Yann[h]angu, Jarnangu, Janjango, Jaernungo, Yaernungo, Janango, Yanango, Yarenango, Murrungun, Gunbirr[dj]i, Malarra, Malara).')
- 4. Guri:ndi (Gurryindi)
- 5. Gamalangga (Garmalangga, Karmalanga, Kokolango, Kokolangomala)

Yirritja moieties. (3 clans)

- 6. Golpa (Kolpa, Golbu, Golba, Gorlba)
- 7. Jalukal (Yalukal, Jalugal)
- 8. Walamangu (Wolamangu, Wallamungo)

== History ==
In 1921, Elcho Island was chosen as the site for a Methodist Overseas Mission. However, oil drilling by the Naphtha Petroleum Company brought about the closure of the proposed mission site, which therefore was relocated to Milingimbi. This mission was established by James Watson in 1922, after that religious organisation had obtained a lease on the site in 1921. Following this twofold usurpation of their key homeland isles, the Yan-nhaŋu then found Milingimbi subject to an influx of other Yolŋu peoples from the mainland, who were drawn to the Mission. Inter-clan fighting erupted, and many Yan-nhaŋu shifted to the less accessible island of Murrungga.

== Ethnography ==
The Yan-nhangu were something of an anomaly in the ethnographic literature. They were described as extinct, and there was little mention of them, even down to as late as the 1980s. The visiting American anthropologist W. Lloyd Warner visited the Crocodile island group on two occasions in 1927 and 1928, as did others such as Donald Thompson in the 1930s.

In the early 1990s a young anthropologist, conversing in Djambarrpuyŋu with an elderly woman, Laurie Baymarrwangga, on a beach on the island of Murruŋga, discovered that she was still fluent in a language that had been barely recorded, apart from a minimal glossary of some 300 words Working together they recorded over the following decades a lexicon with over 4,000 words and a descriptive grammar of the language, together with a detailed mapping of their ecological and cosmological lore.

== Alternative names ==
- Nangu
- Nango
- Nhangu
- Murungga (name of Mooroonga Island)
- Miarrmiarr (? perhaps according to Tindale a clan name)

== Sources ==
- "AIATSIS map of Indigenous Australia". AIATSIS.
- Bowern, Claire; James, Bentley (2010). "Yan-nhaŋu language documentation and revitalisation" (PDF). In Hobson, John; Lowe, Kevin; Poetsch, Susan; Walsh, Michael (eds.). Re-awakening Languages: Theory and practice in the revitalisation of Australia's Indigenous languages. Sydney University Press. pp. 361–371.
- "Galiwin'ku". East Arnhem Land Regional Council. 2015.
- Holmes, Sandra Le Brun (1999). Faces in the Sun: Outback Journeys. Viking. ISBN 978-0-670-87738-6.
- James, Bentley (2009). Time and Tide: in the Crocodile Islands: Change and Continuity in Yan-hnaŋu Marine Identity (PDF) (Doctoral thesis). Australian National University.
- James, Bentley (2015). "The Language of 'Spiritual Power': From Mana to Märr on the CrocodileIslands". In Toner, P. G. (ed.). Strings of Connectedness: Essays in honour of Ian Keen. pp. 235–261. JSTOR j.ctt183q3jp.18.
- Jennison, J. C. (1927). "Notes on the language of the Elcho Island aborigines". Transactions of the Royal Society of South Australia. 51: 177–192.
- Keen, Ian (August 1995). "Metaphor and the Metalanguage: "Groups" in Northeast Arnhem Land". American Ethnologist. 22 (3): 502–527. doi:10.1525/ae.1995.22.3.02a00030. JSTOR 645969.
- McKenzie, Maisie (1976). Mission to Arnhem Land. Rigby.
- Morphy, Frances (1983). "Yolgnu". In Dixon, Robert M. W.; Blake, Barry J. (eds.). Handbook of Australian Languages. Vol. 3. John Benjamins Publishing. pp. 1–188. ISBN 978-9-027-22005-9.
- Tindale, Norman Barnett (1974a). "Djinang (NT)". Aboriginal Tribes of Australia: Their Terrain, Environmental Controls, Distribution, Limits, and Proper Names. Australian National University. ISBN 978-0-708-10741-6. Archived from the original on 17 February 2018.
- Tindale, Norman Barnett (1974b). "Nango (NT)". Aboriginal Tribes of Australia: Their Terrain, Environmental Controls, Distribution, Limits, and Proper Names. Australian National University. Archived from the original on 3 March 2021.
- Warner, William Lloyd (April 1930). "Morphology and Functions of the Australian Murngin Type of Kinship". American Anthropologist. 32 (2): 207–256. doi:10.1525/aa.1930.32.2.02a00010. JSTOR 661305.
- Warner, William Lloyd (April–June 1931). "Morphology and Functions of the Australian Murngin Type of Kinship (Part II)". American Anthropologist. 33 (2): 172–198. doi:10.1525/aa.1931.33.2.02a00030. JSTOR 660835.
