= Ritharrngu language =

Australian Aboriginal language

Ritharnggu
- Ritarungo, Ritharrŋu, etc.
- Native to: Australia
- Region: Northern Territory
- Ethnicity: Ritharrngu
- Native speakers: 9 (2021 census, listed as "Wagilak")
- Language family: Pama–Nyungan: Yolngu Matha; Southern (Dhuwal); Ritharnggu
- Dialects: Ritharngu; Wagilak
- Signed forms: Yolŋu Sign Language

Language codes
- ISO 639-3: rit
- Glottolog: rita1239
- AIATSIS: N104
- ELP: Ritharrngu

The Ritharnggu language (Ritharrŋu, Ritharngu, Ritarungo) is an Australian Aboriginal language of the Yolŋu language group, spoken in Australia's Northern Territory.

Dialects align with the two kinship moieties of the Ritharrngu people, one of several Yolngu peoples: (a) Ritharnggu (Yirritja moiety), and (b) Wagilak language (Dua moiety). The Manggurra (the other Dua clan) now speak Ritharnggu, but apparently shifted from Nunggubuyu.

== Language revival ==
As of 2020, Wägilak/Ritharrŋu is one of 20 languages prioritised as part of the Priority Languages Support Project, being undertaken by First Languages Australia and funded by the Department of Communications and the Arts. The project aims to "identify and document critically-endangered languages — those languages for which little or no documentation exists, where no recordings have previously been made, but where there are living speakers".

== Grammar ==
Ritharnggu has a split ergativity system. Pronouns use nominative/accusative alignment, humans and higher animals a tripartite system, and everything else ergative/absolutive.
