= Walker River (Northern Territory) =

River in the Northern Territory of Australia

Walker
- Location of the Walker River mouth in the Northern Territory
- Etymology: Thomas Walker

Location
- Country: Australia
- Territory: Northern Territory

Physical characteristics
- Source: Mitchell Ranges
  - location: Arnhem Land, Australia
  - elevation: 315 m (1,033 ft)
- Mouth: Blue Mud Bay
  - location: Gulf of Carpentaria, Australia
  - coordinates: 13°35′21″S 135°49′58″E
- Length: 119 km (74 mi)
- Basin size: 9,731 km^{2} (3,757 sq mi)
- Discharge
  - average: 106 m^{3}/s (3,700 cu ft/s)

Basin features
- Tributaries
  - left: Strawbridge Creek, Laurie Creek, Marura River
  - right: Conway Creek

The Walker River is a river in the Northern Territory, Australia.

== Course ==
The headwaters of the river are in the Mitchell Ranges and the river flows in a southerly direction between Mount Ramsay and Mount Fleming and through Fairy Glen then down onto a plain then cuts through Bath Range under Mount Rankine and veering eastward. The river then passes the Aboriginal communities of Marrkalawa and Andanangki the past the Coast Range and discharges into Blue Mud Bay and the Gulf of Carpentaria and the Arafura Sea.

The river catchment occupies an area of 9,731 square kilometres (3,757 sq mi) and is wedged between the Koolatong River catchment to the north, the Goyder River catchment to the west, and the Roper River catchment to the south. It has a mean annual outflow of 3,350 gigalitres (4.382×10^{9} cu yd).

The estuary formed at the river mouth is in near pristine condition with a tidal delta. The estuary at the river mouth occupies an area of 29.5 hectares (73 acres) of open water. It is river dominated in nature with a tide dominated delta with a single channel and is surrounded by an area of 30.9 hectares (76 acres) covered with mangroves.

== History ==
The traditional owners of the area are the Nunggubuyu people, who have inhabited the area for thousands of years.

The river was named by the explorer, David Lindsay, during his expedition through Arnhem Land in 1883. Lindsay named it after Thomas Walker, the leader of the Blue Mud Bay prospecting party, who was murdered by Aboriginal people in the area in 1875.

== See also ==
- List of rivers of Australia § Northern Territory
