= Buckingham Bay =

Bay in Northern Territory, Australia

Coordinates: 12°07′S 135°50′E

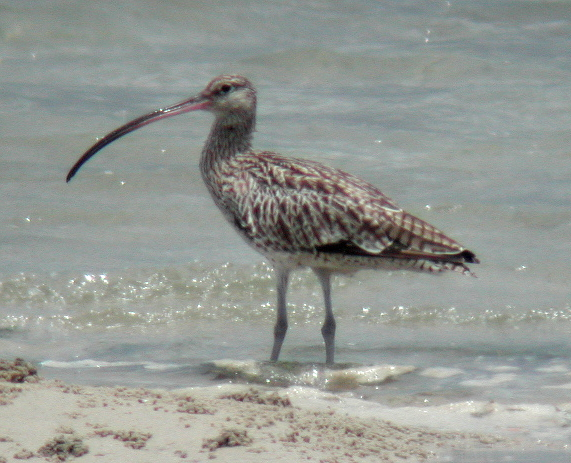
Buckingham Bay is an important site for the Far Eastern curlew

Buckingham Bay is a large, rectangular bay on the northern coast of Arnhem Land, in the Northern Territory of Australia. It lies 520 km east of Darwin and 120 km west of Nhulunbuy.

== Description ==
The bay is about 40 km long and 16 km wide. It is aligned from south-west where the Buckingham River enters, to north-east where it opens into the Arafura Sea. It is largely bordered by intertidal mudflats, with patches of mangroves along the lower reaches of the Buckingham River. The saline flats back on to a seasonally inundated floodplain. There are scattered patches of dry coastal vine thicket along the margins of the floodplain. The bay and adjoining plains are held by the Arnhem Land Aboriginal Land Trust as Aboriginal freehold land. The nearest communities are Galiwin'ku on Elcho Island 15 km to the north-west, and Gapuwiyak some 25 km to the south.

=== Birds ===
The bay's intertidal mudflats and seasonally flooded coastal plains have been classified by BirdLife International as an Important Bird Area (IBA). The area covered by the IBA is 32,642 ha. The bay is especially significant for the migratory waders, or shorebirds, that breed in northern Asia and Alaska during the northern summer and spend the non-breeding season in Australia. Up to about 20,000 wades have been recorded on the bay's mud and saline flats. Species for which count data indicate the site's global significance include black-tailed godwit (6000), eastern curlew (700), and great knot (5000).

Up to 8500 waterbirds have been recorded using the bay, with numbers of pied herons being globally significant. A waterbird breeding colony in the mangroves near the mouth of the Buckingham River contained 5500 birds in 1999, predominantly pied herons and intermediate egrets. Other birds for which the site is significant are brolgas and magpie geese.

=== Other animals ===
Introduced water buffalos and feral pigs threaten the wetlands.
