= Gapuwiyak, Northern Territory =

Gapuwiyak Northern Territory
- Coordinates: 12.5032°S 135.8057°E
- Population: 871
- Postcode(s): 0880
- LGA(s): East Arnhem Region
- Territory electorate(s): Arnhem
- Federal division(s): Lingiari

Gapuwiyak, also known as Lake Evella, is an Aboriginal Australian community located in north-eastern Arnhem Land, Northern Territory, 25 kilometres (16 mi) south of the head of Buckingham Bay and about the same distance south-west of Arnhem Bay. The settlement had a population of 871 people recorded at the 2016 census.

Gapuwiyak is adjacent to Lake Evella. The lake was seen by Harold Shepherdson from his Miles Hawk aeroplane in 1935 and he named it Lake Evella after his wife Ella, and Eva, the wife of a fellow missionary Rev. T.T. Webb. Gapuwiyak means "brackish water" (Gapu – water; Wiyak – salty).

In the 1960s David Burrumarra advocated for the creation of the community as a part of the outstation movement.

The community is serviced by a barge from Darwin once a week that comes up the Buckingham River.

The community comprises Aboriginal people from many different families or clans. It produces a newsletter called Gapuwiyak Dhäwu.

In April 2017, a four-day festival to mark the Rom ceremony was attended by about 500 people at Gapuwiyak School. The Yolngu Rom comprises the laws, values, beliefs, songs, language and culture of the people, and the young people learn from participation in the event, which is attended by people of all ages. It was planned to hold the event each term.

The health clinic transitioned to a community-managed model in 2018, and is managed by Miwatj Health Aboriginal Corporation.

== See also ==
- Lake Evella Airport
