= Yolŋu languages =

Family of Australian Aboriginal languages

Yolŋu Matha
- Yuulngu
- Geographic distribution: In northeastern Arnhem Land, including Elcho Island, Crocodile Islands, Wessel Islands, English Company's Islands, Northern Territory, Australia
- Ethnicity: Yolngu
- Native speakers: 4,600
- Linguistic classification: Pama–Nyungan: Yolŋu Matha
- Subdivisions: Signed form: Yolŋu Sign Language

Language codes
- Glottolog: yuul1239
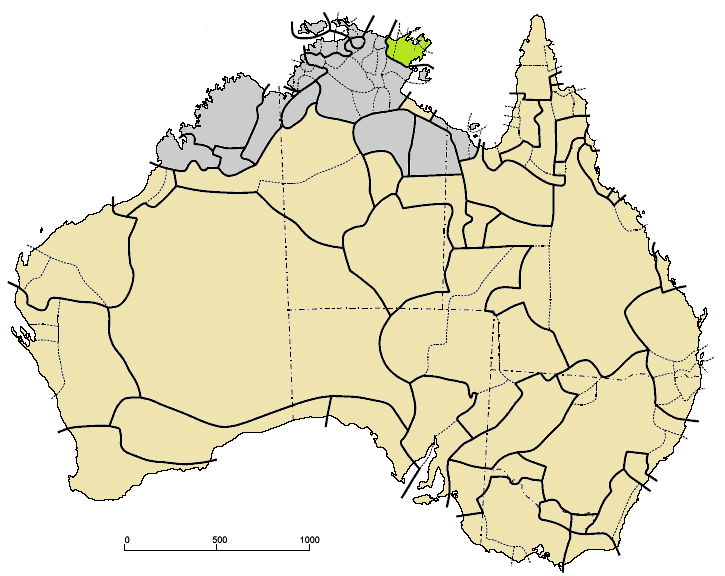
- Yolŋu languages (green) among other Pama–Nyungan (tan)

Yolŋu Matha (IPA: [ˈjuːlŋu ˈmat̪a]), meaning "the Yolŋu tongue", is a linguistic family that includes the languages of the Yolŋu clans, who are Aboriginal peoples of northeast Arnhem Land in northern Australia.

The family of languages includes the Dhangu-Djangu; Nhangu; Dhuwal; Ritharngu; Djinang; and Djinba languages.

== Varieties ==
Yolŋu Matha consists of about six languages, some mutually intelligible, divided into about thirty clan varieties and perhaps twelve different dialects, each with its own Yolŋu name. Put together, in 2002 there were about 4600 speakers of Yolŋu Matha languages. Exogamy has often meant that mothers and fathers speak different languages, so that children traditionally grew up at least bilingual, and in many cases polylingual, meaning that communication was facilitated by mastery of multiple languages and dialects of Yolŋu Matha.

The linguistic situation is very complicated, given that each of the 30 or so clans also has a named language variety. Dixon (2002) distinguishes the following:

Dhangu-Djangu language	Nhangu language	Dhuwal language	Ritharngu language	Djinang language	Djinba language
Wan.gurri	Gamalaŋga	Gupapuyngu	Ritharngu	Yirritjing	Ganhalpuyngu (Ganalbiŋu)
Lamamirri	Gorryindi	Gumatj	Wagilak	Wurlaki	Manjdjalpuyngu (Mandjalpiŋu)
Rirratjingu	Mäḻarra	Djambarrpuyngu		Djardiwitjibi	
Gaalpu	Bindarra	Djapu		Mildjingi	
Ngayimil	Ngurruwulu	Liyagalawumirr		Balmbi	
Warramiri	Walamangu	Guyamirlili		Djuwing	
Mandatja		Dhalwangu		Marrangu	
		Djarrwark		Murrungun	
				Manyarring	

Bowern (2011) adds the varieties in parentheses as distinct languages.

== Phonology ==
=== Consonants ===
The consonant inventory is basically the same across Yolŋu varieties, although some varieties show minor differences.

		Peripheral		Apical			Laminal	Glottal
		Bilabial	Velar	Alveolar	Dental	Retroflex	Palatal	Glottal
Plosive	Lenis	b ⟨b⟩	ɡ ⟨g⟩	d ⟨d⟩	d̪ ⟨dh⟩	ɖ ⟨d̠⟩	ɟ ⟨dj⟩	ʔ ⟨'⟩
Plosive	Fortis	p ⟨p⟩	k ⟨k⟩	t ⟨t⟩	t̪ ⟨th⟩	ʈ ⟨t̠⟩	c ⟨tj⟩	
Nasals		m ⟨m⟩	ŋ ⟨ŋ⟩	n ⟨n⟩	n̪ ⟨nh⟩	ɳ ⟨n̠⟩	ɲ ⟨ny⟩	
Rhotics				r ⟨rr⟩		ɻ ⟨r⟩		
Laterals				l ⟨l⟩		ɭ ⟨l̠⟩		
Approximants		w ⟨w⟩					j ⟨y⟩	

Yolŋu languages have a fortis–lenis contrast in plosive consonants. Lenis/short plosives have weak contact and intermittent voicing, while fortis/long plosives have full closure, a more powerful release burst, and no voicing.

=== Vowels ===
	Front	Central	Back
Close	i ⟨i⟩, iː ⟨e⟩		u ⟨u⟩, uː ⟨o⟩
Open		a ⟨a⟩, aː ⟨ä⟩	

A three-way vowel distinction is shared between Yolŋu varieties, though not all Yolŋu varieties have a contrast in vowel length. In the varieties that do have a length contrast, long vowels occur only in the initial syllable of words.

== In historical use ==
The 1963 Yirrkala bark petitions, a significant political statement asserting their rights to land, were written by elders of various Yolngu clans at Yirrkala mission and submitted to the Parliament of Australia, were written in a standardised Yolngu script developed by the missionary Beulah Lowe, based on Yolngu Matha languages, together with an English translation. One source suggests that it was based on the Gupapuyngu language

== In popular culture ==
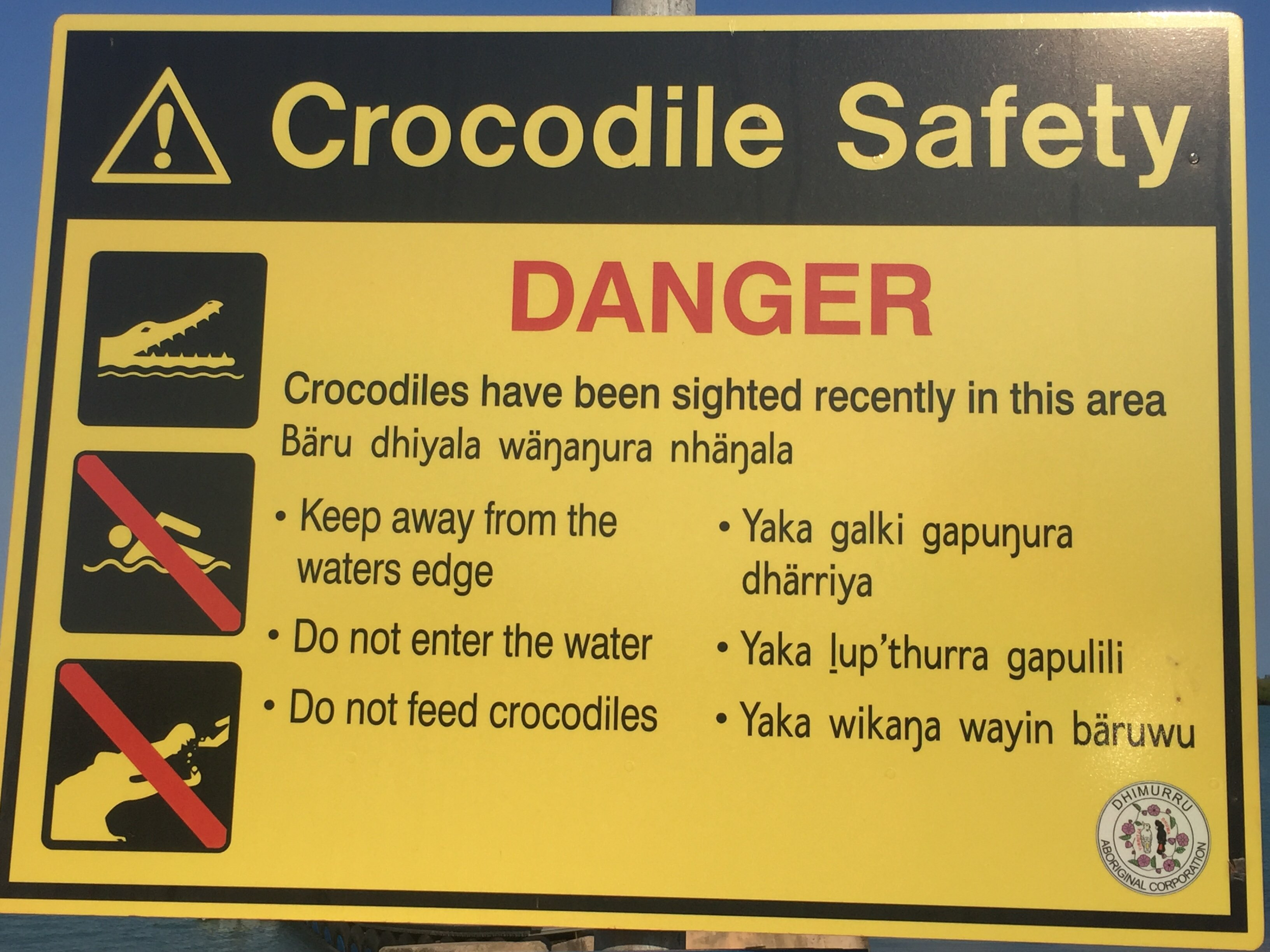
A bilingual sign in both English and Yolŋu Matha warning about crocodiles in Yirrkala, Northern Territory

The films Ten Canoes (2006) and Charlie's Country (2013), both directed by Rolf de Heer and featuring actor David Gulpilil, feature dialogue in Yolŋu Matha. Ten Canoes was the first feature film to be shot entirely in Australian indigenous languages, with the dialogue largely in the Ganalbiŋu variety of Yolŋu Matha.

Dr. G. Yunupingu was a popular Australian singer who sang in the Gumatj dialect of Yolŋu Matha, as did the Aboriginal rock group Yothu Yindi.

Baker Boy, from the community of Milingimbi in North Eastern Arnhem Land, released the song "Cloud 9" in 2017, in which he raps in Yolŋu Matha. As Young Australian of the Year in 2019, the International Year of Indigenous Languages, and with two of his songs in the 2019 Triple J Hottest 100, he raised the profile of Yolŋu Matha in mainstream media as well as giving people at home pride in their language.

On 17 June 2026, it was announced that five episodes of the animated series Bluey would be dubbed in Yolŋu Matha; the voice actors are from the north-east Arnhem Land area, including Dimathaya Burarrwanga (of the band King Stingray) as Bandit Heeler and Andrew Gurruwiwi as "Grandad" Mort Cattle.

== Dictionaries and resources ==
Dictionaries have been produced by Beulah Lowe, David Zorc and Michael Christie. A free, web-based searchable dictionary created by John Greatorex was launched in February 2015 by Charles Darwin University.

There are also several grammars of Yolŋu languages by Jeffrey Heath, Frances Morphy, Melanie Wilkinson and others.

A graduate certificate in Yolŋu studies is offered at Charles Darwin University, teaching Yolŋu kinship, law and the Gupapuyŋu language variety.

ABC Indigenous News Radio broadcasts a news program in Yolngu Matha and also in Warlpiri on weekdays. The Aboriginal Resource and Development Services (ARDS) broadcast live radio in northeast Arnhem Land, Darwin and Palmerston and provide recordings of past programs on the internet.

== Words and expressions ==
- Gakal 'skill, talent, ability'
- Bäru 'crocodile'
- Gapumirr 'with water' (bucket with water), 'watery'.
- Manymak 'good, OK'
- Yol or Yo (pronounced 'yo') 'yes'
- Yo manymak when used together the expression can be synonymous with either of its two component words and also used as a friendly greeting, the 'o' in yo is usually held for longer when used as part of this expression.
- Yaka 'ghost'
- Yothu 'child'
- Akka ‘sister’
- Yindi 'big'
- Yothu Yindi denotes the link between two different entities which is characterised as a mother-child relationship.

=== Austronesian loanwords ===
Like other languages of the Top End, Yolŋu-Matha contains many loanwords from Austronesian languages due to abundant contact with seafaring peoples from the Indonesian archipelago. Walker and Zorc have identified 179 Yolŋu-Matha words that are clearly of Austronesian origin, and have identified a further 70 possible Austronesian loanwords requiring further study.

Examples of Austronesian loanwords in Yolngu-Matha
Yolngu word	Austronesian source language	Austronesian word	Meaning in English
balaʔ	Makassarese	bállaʔ	house
balala	Makassarese	balála	greedy
balaŋu	Makassarese	balaŋo	anchor
baluka	Makassarese	palúkka	thief
baːwʔ	Makassarese or Buginese	báuʔ	fragrance
gaːruŋ	Malay	karoŋ	sack
barawu	Malay	perahu	boat

== Vocabulary ==
Capell (1942) lists the following basic vocabulary items:

gloss	Wan‘guri	Warameri	Galbu	Riraidjango	Yanango	Golba	Gobabwingo	Djambarbwingo	Dalwongo	Ridarngo	Gomaidj	Manggalili	Maṙaṙba	Djinba	Yandjinang
man	jọlŋọ	jọlŋọ	jọlŋọ	jọlŋọ	jọlŋọ	jọlŋọ	jọlŋọ	jọlŋọ	jọlŋọ	jọlŋọ	jọlŋọ	jọlŋọ	jọlŋọ	julŋi	djäriwidji
woman	baɖami	baɖami	miälg	da‘iga	miälg	miälg	miälg	miälg	mareːbulu	diŋ‘	daigaːwuru	daigaːwuru	miälg	miälg	miːlg
head	muɽguɽ	muɽguɽu	mulguɽ	mulguɽ	daːmbu	daːmbu	lia	lia	mulguɽ	lia	lia	lia	mulguɽ	gungu	gɔɳgi
eye	maŋudji	maŋudji	miːl, maŋudji	miːl	maŋudji	miːl	miːl	miːl	maŋudji	miːl	miːl	miːl	miːl	mili	mïːl
nose	ŋọrọ	gamuru	ŋọrọ	ŋọrọ	gamuru		ŋọrọ	ŋọrọ	ŋọrọ	ŋọrọ	ŋọrọ	ŋọrọ	ŋọrọ	ŋɔrɛ	ŋɔrɛ
mouth	ḏa	djurwara	ḏa	ḏa	durwara		ḏa	ḏa	ḏa	ḏɛlŋ	ḏa	ḏa	ḏa	ɽari	ɽari
tongue	ŋaːnar	maḏa	maḏa	ŋaːnar	ŋaːnar	mada	maḏa	maḏa	ŋaːnar	maḏa	ŋaːnar	ŋaːnar	maḏa	djäliŋan	djɛlaŋ
stomach	guru	gulun	gulun	dulmọ	gulun	gulun	gulun	gulun	dulmọ	gulun	gulun	gulun	gulun	gulun	budjiri
bone	maṙiṙin	ŋaɽaga	ŋaɽaga	ŋaɽaga	maṙiṙin		ŋaɽaga	ŋaɽag	ŋaɽaga	ŋaɽaga	ŋaɽaga	ŋaɽaga	ŋaɽaga	ŋaɽaga	ŋiɽigɛ
blood	gulaŋ	jilaŋ	gulaŋ	gulaŋ	gulaŋ	gulaŋ	maŋgo, gulaŋ	maŋgo, gulaŋ	gulaŋ	gula	gulaŋ	wuɽuŋgul	gulaŋ	gulaŋ	bɔṙɛ
kangaroo	wiːɖi	wiːɖi	mundbia	mulbia	wiːɖi		wiːɖi	wiːɖi	ganguɽul	ŋarggọ	mulbia	mulbia	mulbia	ŋarggọ	ŋargọ
possum	ɽubu	marŋo	marŋo	marŋo	marŋo	marŋo	marŋo	marŋo	ɽubu	marŋo	marŋo	ɽubu	marŋo	märŋo	marŋo
emu	maluiːja	wurban	’maluja	maluiːja	baɖaːwuma		wurban	wurban	wurban		wurban	wurban	wurban		wurban
crow	galgmanda	waːg	gälgäriŋọ	waːg	galgmanda		waːg	waːg	waːg	waːgia	waːg	waːg	waːg	waːgia	waːgire
fly	buad	gädiŋälọ	wurubul	buad	buad		wurulul	wurulul	gädiŋäli	buad	gädiŋälọ	gädiŋäli	wurulul	bolgi	muruläl
sun	walọ	walọ	walọ	walọ	bïːn	walọ	walọ	walọ	larŋgai	walir	walọ	walọ	walọ	djäɽbiɽ	walir
moon	wa̱lmura	boːla	ŋaɭindi	wa̱lmura	walmura	wa̱lmura	ŋaɭindi	ŋaɭindi	ŋaɭindi	ŋaɭindi, gulgia	ŋaɭindi	wirmu	naɭindi	galgi	ɽangu
fire	ŋurdja	ŋurdja	ḏäŋuḏa	ḏäŋuḏa	bwiːmar	guɽda̱	guɽḏa	guɽḏa	ḏäŋuḏa	guɽḏa	goɽḏa	’bujuga	ŋuɽa	djoŋgɛ	djoŋgɛ
smoke	ŋawurŋawur	ḏiliwur	ŋäräli	ŋäräli	ḏiliwur		ḏiliwur	ḏiliwur	ŋäräli	baːn	ḏiliwur	diliwur	ŋäräli	mälggɛ	ŋaɽimbi
water	ŋargula	gaɽmag	magadi	gabu	gabu	gabu	gabu	gabu	gudjärg	gabu	gabu	gudjäɽg	gabu	gabi	gabe
