= Nunggubuyu people =

Aboriginal Australian people

The Nunggubuyu are an Aboriginal Australian people of eastern Arnhem Land in the Northern Territory.

== Language ==
Nunggubuyu also called Wubuy is a non-Pama Nyungan language characterized by head marking with an intricate verb prefix morphology, bound pronominal forms for subject and object and prefixed noun classes. Together with Anindilyagwa it shares the distinction of being one of the most grammatically complicated Australian languages. (Note: 'The Nunggubuyu language, . may be an example of cultural complexity that approaches the limit of what the human mind is capable of learning, a complexity that may have arisen from millennia old relative isolation,') It has at least 28 loanwords from Makassarese language. Its affiliation with other native Australian languages is disputed. Some speak of a Nunggubuyu–Ngandi language family, or of it belonging to a larger Gunwingguan language family.

The first dictionary of the language was written by the missionary Earl Hughes, who lived among the Nunggubuy for 17 years and spoke the language fluently. Intensive follow-up work, resulting in two major monographs, was undertaken by Jeffrey Heath in the 1970s.

== Country ==
The Nunggubuyu's traditional lands extended over some 2,700 square miles (7,000 km^{2}) southwards from Cape Barrow and Harris Creek to the coastal area opposite Edward Island, and their western boundaries were formed by the Rose and Walker Rivers.

== History ==
The Nunggubuyu had very important cultural and economic ties with the Warndarang, extinct now as a distinct language group though descendants of several clans of the latter were absorbed by the Nunggubuyu.

== Social structure ==
As elsewhere in Australia, kinship and descent are dominant concerns of Nunggubuyu society. However they do not share the very frequent system of sections and subsections that determine affinal relations in many Australian tribes, but rather interpersonal genealogical relationships undergird the social structure. This feature, anomalous for the area, is one the Nunggubuyu share with Papuan and Melanasian peoples, such as the Marind-Anim people.

The society is structured by a four-fold division covering moieties, phratries, clans and patriarchal lineages.

There are two moieties: the Mandayung (with myths that tend to associate it with continuity and dispute resolution) and the Mandaridja, whose myths suggest experimentation and change. They mirror in some respects the dua/yiridja moiety structures of the Yolngu of northeast Arnhem Land. For this reason Mandaridja people absorb into their totemic systems things that are of foreign provenance, such as ships, planes and tractors. There are two mytho-ritual complexes divided among these respective moieties. The Mandayung are the proprietors of the Gunabibi (Kunapipi) cult, while the Mandaridja control the "Ru:1" cult.

== Sources ==
- Burbank, Victoria Katherine (2011). An Ethnography of Stress: The Social Determinants of Health in Aboriginal Australia. Springer. ISBN 978-0-230-11722-8.
- Capell, Arthur (September 1960). "Myths and Tales of the Nunggubuyu, S.E. Arnhem Land". Oceania. 31 (1): 31–62. doi:10.1002/j.1834-4461.1960.tb01738.x. JSTOR 40329241.
- Clunies Ross, Margaret (December 1978). "The Structure of Arnhem Land Song-Poetry". Oceania. 49 (2): 128–156. doi:10.1002/j.1834-4461.1978.tb01383.x. JSTOR 40330404.
- Evans, Nicholas (1992). "Macassan loanwords in topend languages". Australian Journal of Linguistics. 12 (1): 45–91. doi:10.1080/07268609208599471.
- Grimes, Barbara (2003). "Gunwingguan languages". In Frawley, William (ed.). International Encyclopedia of Linguistics: AAVE-Esperanto. Vol. 1. Oxford University Press. pp. 119–120. ISBN 978-0-195-13977-8.
- Heath, Jeffrey (1978). Linguistic diffusion in Arnhem Land. Australian Institute of Aboriginal Studies.
- Heath, Jeffrey (1980). Nunggubuyu myths and ethnographic texts (PDF). Australian Institute of Aboriginal Studies.
- Heath, Jeffrey (1982). Nunggubuyu Dictionary (PDF). Australian Institute of Aboriginal Studies.
- van der Leeden, A.C. (2013). "Nunggubuyu Aboriginals and Marind-Anim: Preliminary Comparisons between South-Eastern Arnhem Land and Southern New Guinea". In van Beek, W. E. A.; Scherer, J. H. (eds.). Explorations in the anthropology of religion: Essays in Honour of Jan van Baal. Springer. pp. 147–165. ISBN 978-9-401-74902-2.
- Leeding, Velma J. (1996). "Body parts and possession in Anindilyakwa". In Chappell, Hilary; McGregory, William (eds.). The Grammar of Inalienability: A Typological Perspective on Body Part Terms and the Part-whole Relation. Walter de Gruyter. pp. 193–249. ISBN 978-3-110-12804-8.
- McConvell, Patrick (2010). "Contact and Indigenous Languages in Australia". In Hickey, Raymond (ed.). The Handbook of Language Contact. John Wiley & Sons. pp. 770–783. ISBN 978-1-405-17580-7.
- Musgrave, Simon; Thieberger, Nick (October 2012). Nordhoff, Sebastian (ed.). "Language description and hypertext: Nunggubuyu as a case study" (PDF). Language Documentation & Conservation (Special Publication No. 4). Electronic Grammaticography: 63–77.
- Tindale, Norman Barnett (1974). "Nunggubuju (NT)". Aboriginal Tribes of Australia: Their Terrain, Environmental Controls, Distribution, Limits, and Proper Names. Australian National University Press. ISBN 978-0-708-10741-6.
