= Laurie Baymarrwangga =

Laurie Baymarrwangga (Baymarrwaŋa)
- Born: c. 1917; Murruŋga Island, Australia
- Died: 20 August 2014
- Occupation: Aboriginal Australian elder
- Known for: Intergenerational transmission of cultural knowledge and heritage, preservation of biological heritage, preservation of traditional languages.

Laurie Baymarrwangga (Gawany) Baymarrwaŋa (c. 1917 – 20 August 2014) was the senior Aboriginal traditional owner of the Malarra estate, which includes Galiwin'ku, Dalmana, Murruŋga, Brul-brul and the Ganatjirri Maramba salt water surrounding the islands and inclusive of some 300 other named sites. She devoted her life to the intergenerational transmission of the ancestral language and knowledge of her homelands on the Crocodile Islands, for the benefit of future generations.

She is a great-great-grandmother of the Malarra-Gunbiirrtji clan, and in 2012 was reportedly 95 years old. She spoke the Yan-nhangu language, Djambarrpuyŋu, and several other regional languages of northeast Arnhem Land.

She was named Senior Northern Territory Australian of the Year and Senior Australian of the Year in 2012. Her encyclopaedic knowledge was the inspiration for an ethnographic publication and a language documentation project.

== Early life ==
Laurie Baymarrwangga (Gawany) Baymarrwaŋa was born c. 1917, on Murruŋga Island (the largest of the outer Crocodile Islands of north-east Arnhem Land), in the Northern Territory of Australia.

== Career ==
She was first photographed by the Rev Harold Shepperdson on Milingimbi in 1925 and then by Donald Thomson on Murrungga Island in April 1937. She survived the World War II Japanese bombing of Milingimbi in 1943.

In the 1960s, she began a return to her island homeland at Murruŋga, becoming permanently resident in the 1970s. In 1968, she started a bilingual school under a tree on the island, and it was taken over by NT Education in 1975.

In 1993, she started the Yan-nhaŋu dictionary project with fellow speakers and the anthropologist Bentley James. (Yan-nhangu Dictionary 1994–2003) In her late eighties and with no English Baymarrwaŋa worked in Yolŋu matha with Bentley, and together they visited and recorded the first Yan-nhaŋu maps (600 sites). With barely 250 Yan-nhaŋu words recorded they began the Yan-nhaŋu dictionary team (1993–4) preparing the first Yan-nhaŋu dictionary, first ethnography, and using self-generated funds, created a family of lasting collaborative projects. Side by side they created, conceived, designed and ran the earliest Crocodile Islands Rangers and junior rangers programs, an on-line (talking-pictorial) trilingual dictionary for homelands schools, multi-generational "Language Nests" project, heritage protection projects on the fish-traps, fresh water wells, fire regimes, creating cultural artefacts, and care for and registration of sacred sites on the Crocodile Islands.

Claire Bowern compiled a learner's guide to the language. Together, Baymarrwaŋa and Bentley wrote the Yan-nhaŋu Atlas and Illustrated Dictionary of the Crocodile Islands with over four thousand Yan-nhaŋu words translated into Dhuwal/Dhuwala and English for children speaking Yolŋu and English. The Yan-nhaŋu Atlas and Illustrated Dictionary seeks to provide opportunities for new generations to know the language of place and walk in the footsteps of the ancestors. Together they handed out the atlas to over thirty homelands, twelve schools and hundreds of libraries Australia wide. The generosity and vision of this project spring naturally from the wisdom of kinship and reciprocity that are at the heart indigenous relations to country.

The Yan-nhaŋu dictionary team continues work on Yan-nhaŋu grammar.

In 1997, Baymarrwaŋa and Bentley introduced Yan-nhaŋu into the bilingual school curriculum.

In 2002, she initiated the Crocodile Islands Rangers, which she personally funded in 2009. They conceived of and negotiated the creation of a turtle sanctuary and were working towards a plan to feed local children every day with local fish caught and distributed by local rangers, "Lima gurrku guya riya-gunhanyini ŋalimalamagu gurruṯuwaygu : We will share our fish with our kin". (Baymarrwaŋa 2002) In 2010, after a struggle stretching back to 1945, Laurie received back payments for rents owed to her as the land and sea owner of her father's estate. She donated it all, around A$400,000, to improve education and employment opportunities on the islands and to establish a 1,000 square kilometre turtle sanctuary on her marine estate. [...] She wants us all to remain courageous and undaunted in our recognition of the value of cultural differences in creating a future and a nation of which we can all be proud".

== Death and legacy ==
Laurie died in August 2014. The Crocodile Islands Rangers, which she helped establish, stated "Our wonderful patron sadly passed peacefully away in August 2014". The anthropologist Dr. Bentley James, who worked with her to create the Yan-nhaŋu Atlas and Illustrated Dictionary, said on his website,

"The very much adored, and deeply admired paramount matriarch of the Yan-nhaŋu people Laurie Baymarrwaŋa passed peacefully away in her ninety seventh year on Wednesday 20th of August. Her life was inestimable, her virtue remarkable, and her passing bequeaths a fabulous legacy. Born in the time before the coming of the missions, she remembered the old ways, the ways of kin and country. Her dream to entrust this knowledge to new generations as a foundation, a font of strength and counsel in the law, drove her to create a homeland, a school, ranger and heritage programs, marine sanctuaries, language nests and an Atlas among other gifts. Senior Australian of the year 2012, her vast knowledge of generations of social and physical geography was revered by others who themselves are old and wise. To the very end she struggled to save her ocean home from mining and exploitation, unspoiled for future generations. Baymarrwaŋa’s love and generosity for the world is something one rarely sees . . . if only it were more common. A truly great leader, a nurturer, her spirit returns to the homelands that created and compelled her".

A painting of Baymarrwaŋa by artist Gill Warden was featured on the Australian Institute of Aboriginal and Torres Strait Islander Studies 2019 International Women's Day poster.

The film about her life, Big Boss: Last Leader of the Crocodile Islands, won the United Nations Association of Australia Media Peace Prize in the Promotion of Indigenous Recognition category in 2015.

== Awards and honours ==
- In 2011, she won a Lifetime Achievement Award from the NT Research and Innovation Board for the Crocodile Islands Initiative in honour of her ongoing struggle to care for the linguistic, cultural and biological diversity of her homelands and save them from administrative closure.
- She was the 2012 Senior Australian of the Year, awarded for her "leadership and commitment in caring for the Crocodile Islands biological and cultural environment".
