= Djinba language =

Indigenous Australian language

Djinba
- Native to: Australia
- Region: Northern Territory
- Ethnicity: Djinba
- Native speakers: 53 (2006 census)
- Language family: Pama–Nyungan: Yolngu Matha; Western (Djinang); Djinba
- Dialects: Ganalbingu; Mandjalpingu
- Signed forms: Yolŋu Sign Language

Language codes
- ISO 639-3: djb
- Glottolog: djin1252
- AIATSIS: N97
- ELP: Djinba

Djinba is an Australian Aboriginal Yolŋu language, spoken by the Djinba in eastern Arnhem Land, Northern Territory.

Dialects of the two moieties are (a) Ganalbingu (Ganhalpuyngu) and (b) Mandjalpingu (Manydjalpuyngu).

Speakers of Mandjalpingu include the actor and traditional dancer David Gulpilil.
