= Djinang language =

Australian Aboriginal language

Djinang
- Native to: Australia
- Region: Northern Territory
- Ethnicity: Djinang people
- Native speakers: 120 (2021 census); 33 Wurlaki
- Language family: Pama–Nyungan: Yolngu Matha; Western (Djinang); Djinang
- Dialects: Wurlaki; Djardiwitjibi; Mildjingi; Balmbi; Marrangu; Murrungun; Manyarring
- Signed forms: Yolŋu Sign Language

Language codes
- ISO 639-3: dji
- Glottolog: djin1253
- AIATSIS: N94_1
- ELP: Djinang
- Djinang is classified as Definitely Endangered by the UNESCO Atlas of the World's Languages in Danger (2010)

Djinang is an Australian Aboriginal language, one of the family of Yolŋu languages which are spoken in the north-east Arnhem Land region of the Northern Territory.

Dialects of the two moieties are:

- Yirritjing – Wurlaki, Djardiwitjibi, Mildjingi, Balmbi, and
- Djuwing – Marrangu, Murrungun, Manyarring.

Wurlaki is included in a language revival project, as one of many critically endangered languages.

== Introduction ==
=== History ===
Djinang is a language found in the Northern Territory of Australia in Arnhem Land. Djinang is a part of the Yolngu language family—consisting of 11 other languages. It is a part of the much larger Pama-Nyungan language family—285 languages. Mark Harvey (2011) writes "Pama-Nyungan is a genetic grouping, which occupies ca. 90% of the continent". Djinang has several dialects: Manyarring, Marrangu, Murrungun, Balmbi, Djaḏiwitjibi, Mildjingi, and Wuḻaki (Wurlaki), but has only one sister language, which is the endangered language of Djinba, spoken by 45 people.

=== Population ===
The people are simply called the Djinang. Based on the 2006 census their population is 220 people. The Djinang are genetically linked with 90% of Australia, which points to a common ancestor from the distant past. Multilingualism is highly prevalent, not just with the Djinang, but throughout all of Australia. It came as a necessity for very specific reasons. First, when visiting a clan that has a different language, it is proper etiquette to speak in the host's language. Not only is it polite, but more importantly to the Aboriginal people, it appeases the ancient ancestors of the host clan. Likewise, children usually have a father from one clan and a mother from another clan. While the father's language would be the child's primary language, the child would learn the mother's language and would speak to her in her own language.

The Djinang, and indeed all Aboriginal people, even though they are multilingual, but keep their primary language in a place of great importance. One reason for this is that their language is directly connected to their land. While the Djinang have no definite boundaries to their lands, they and the clans of surrounding areas know which sites belong to a language. Their land is what links the Djinang to their ancestors—a function of bapurrur. It is because of this "land–language" dependency that Australian languages are largely contained in a particular region.

== Sounds ==
The Djinang language is based on a set of 24 phonemes, of which only three of those phonemes are vowels; giving Djinang a high consonant-vowel ratio of seven. This differs from most Pacific languages as they tend to favor larger vowel variation along with a modest set of consonants. Thus most Pacific languages customarily have average to low consonant-vowel ratios.

=== Consonants ===
		Bilabial	Alveolar	Retroflex	Palatal	Velar
Plosive	voiceless	p	t	ʈ	c	k
Plosive	voiced	b	d	ɖ	ɟ	g
Nasal		m	n	ɳ	ɲ	ŋ
Lateral			l	ɭ		
Trill			r			
Approximant			ɻ		j	w

Djinang has 21 consonants. All languages in Australia share similar sound systems characteristic of few fricatives and sibilants, and the only allophones, are allophones of plosives. For example, the phonemes /b/, /d/, and /g/ could be sounded as /p/, /t/, and /k/ in certain Aboriginal languages. However, in Djinang there is a clear contrast between those phonemes along with the phonemes of c/ɟ.

=== Vowels ===
	Front	Back
High	i	u
Low	a	

Of Djinang's 24 phoneme set, only three are vowels. In addition to the low vowel count, or because of it, there are also no instances of diphthongs or triphthongs. Moreover, there is no distinction of vowel length; however, there are instances of vowel lengthening when certain conditions are met, but they do not warrant a unique designation.

=== Syllable structure ===
The syllable structure of the Djinang language would be classified as moderately complex. It has three underlying syllable patterns CV, CVC, and CVCC. Because of Djinang's syllable patterns there are very few words that actually start with vowels or with consonant clusters.

== Grammar ==
=== Basic word order ===
Djinang is classified as a suffixing language and, therefore, has a flexible typology, in other words it does not rely on word order to convey meaning. In regards to nouns Djinang depends on case (Nominative, Genitive, Ablative etc.) to show its function. When speaking of verbs Djinang relies heavily on suffixes to imply tense, mood, and aspect. With that being said, Djinang and, indeed most Australian languages, have a tendency to follow a subject, object, verb (S.O.V.) typology

=== Verbs ===
In Djinang verbs are extremely important in conveying the bulk of an utterance. Verbs are so prominent that pronouns and certain nouns would only be implied; ex:

irri mina-li
I carry-TODAY-PAST
'I carried (it)'

There are three major sets of verbs: classes I, II, III; within each class there are smaller groups separated by stem ending e.g. -i, -rr, -ji. Each verb is sorted by the suffix it uses to signal tenses specific to Djinang:

1. non-past
2. future
3. yesterday-past
4. imperative
5. today-past
6. today-past-irrealis
7. today-past-continuous

Additionally many verb stems contain a noun related to the definition of a verb; for example: djama – 'work' n. and djamadjigi – 'work', v. Customarily, dji is added to the noun, which creates the verb stem – in this case, djamadji; the suffix -gi places the verb in either the non-past or future tense.

Verb tenses
	class I	class II	class III
non-past	-(n)gi	-gi, rr	-ji
future	-gi	-gi	-dji
yesterday-past	-mi	-nmi	-0/ -rri
imperative	-wi	-rri	-yi
today-past	-(ngi)li	-(dji)ni	-ni
today-past-irrealis	-nyiri	-niri	-nyiri
today-past-continuous	-nyi	-ni	-nyi

=== Nouns ===
Nouns follow a similar process to verbs, but while verbs state when or how an action was done, nouns denote subject, object, and possession. Noun cases mark a noun as either the subject or object. They also mark implied prepositions like: 'to', 'for', 'from', etc. An example of an implied preposition is the Djinang word gurrbi 'camp' – gurrbile allative '(to) camp'. Furthermore in an Australian language there are three very important grammatical associations that nouns can take: Transitive subject (ergative), intransitive subject (nominative), and the object (accusative). Because word order is variable, these cases are important in building an intelligible utterance. The chart below lists the different noun cases with their functions and common endings.

Genitive (of, for)	-ang	-girang	
Dative (for)	-gi	-ri	
Ergative (subj. of trans. V)	-dji	-ri	-ir
Nominative (subj. of intrans. V)	-dji	-ri	-ir
Instrumental (with, by)	-dji	-mi	-ir
Essive	-ipmi	-le	-ngimi
Allative (to)	-li	-ngirinyi	
Accusative (obj)	-nyi		
Ablative (from, after)	-ngir		

=== Deictics and interrogatives ===
An interesting aspect of Djinang is the nominal class of words (deictics and interrogative). Deictics use the same cases as nouns. They also often convey number (singular/plural) and relative distance like 'this', 'here' or 'that', 'there'.

An example of suffix compounding in the deictic word class:

- nguṉuginyi 'that one' (accusative)
- nguṉugirang 'that one's' (genitive)
- nguṉugiranggima 'that one's' (genitive) (emphatic possessive)

Interrogative particles are quite simply the words that signify an utterance as a question, e.g. wari 'who', nyadji 'when'. In Djinang interrogative particles are found at the beginning of an utterance in exactly the same manner as the English language.

== Vocabulary ==
=== Indigenous vocabulary ===
- baḏayaladjidji 'be bright'
- galŋayngu 'king brown snake'
- ngagirrgi 'obscure'
- yalpung 'peel'
- bumirḻiḻi 'bald'
- ḏanyḏanyi 'midday'
- mapatj 'short pipe'
- ganydjarr 'power'

=== Loanwords ===
Loanwords derived from English:

- djakdjipin 'safety pin'
- djambaku 'tobacco'
- djandi 'Sunday'
- djatadi 'Saturday'
- gandin 'store (canteen)'
- garraktdji 'crosscut saw'
- kital 'cattle station'
- mitjigin 'mission'

== Endangerment ==
=== Materials ===
There is very little written about the Djinang language or its people. The majority of all papers written on Djinang were all written by the same author, Bruce E. Waters.

- "A Distinctive Features Approach to Djinang Phonology and Verb Morphology" (1979)
- "Djinang and Djinba: a grammatical and historical perspective" (1983)
- "A Grammar of Djinang" (1984)
- "Djinang and Djinba: a grammatical and historical perspective" (1989)

Anthropologist Ad Borsboom worked with the Djinang in the 1970s and has published papers about the Marrajiri ritual and song repertoire.

- Borsboom, A. P. (1978). Maradjiri: A modern ritual complex in Arnhem Land, Northern Australia. Nijmegen: Katholieke Universitiet.
- Borsboom, A. P. (1986). "The Cultural Dimension of Change: An Australian Example". Anthropos. 81 (4/6): 605–615. JSTOR 40461234.

Anthropologist Craig Elliott lived and worked with Djinang/Wurlaki people in the late 1980s and has also written about local cosmology and songs. His work contains much linguistic information.

- Elliott, Craig (1991). Mewal is Merri's name: form and ambiguity in Marrangu cosmology, North Central Arnhem Land (Master of Arts thesis). Canberra: Australian National University. doi:10.25911/5d74e699eebf0.
- Elliott, Craig (2015). "Conceptual Dynamism and Ambiguity in Marrangu Djinang Cosmology, North-Central Arnhem Land". In Toner, P. G. (ed.). Strings of Connectedness: essays in honour of Ian Keen. Canberra: Australian National University. pp. 101–117. ISBN 978-1-925022-62-9. JSTOR j.ctt183q3jp.12.

Djinang teaching staff, assistant teachers and literacy workers in Maningrida and Ramingining continue to produce literacy materials for use in their schools and for a local community audience. As part of the Maningrida Dictionary project in 1998–2001, linguist Anita Berghout and Wurlaki woman KB (now deceased) worked together on preparing a Djinang and Wurlaki dictionary and learner's guide (still unpublished).

=== Vitality ===
Although having a population of around 220 and no presence in modern medium (TV, radio, text, etc.), Ethnologue designates Djinang as being 6a (Vigorous); which is a language that is used for "face-to-face communication by all generations" and is sustainable.

The reasons for Djinang's robustness begin with where Djinang is located in Australia: Arnhem Land, which is the home of the entire Yolngu language family. It was declared an Aboriginal Reserve in 1931. It is a place that is still very much steeped in the traditional Aboriginal ways. It is a large secluded area that is considered by many people to be the least spoiled in the entire world. It is a place that is inaccessible to most people and forms of transportation. Because the majority of the Djinang people live similarly to how their ancestors did, their practices of exogamy and multilingualism are still in practice.

The Djinang place significant importance on their language, as reflected in their sacred songs and in the way language is passed on to children. Due to exogamy, children typically grow up with parents who speak different languages, leading them to learn both languages from an early age. This contributes to strong intergenerational language transmission.

The way of life both helps and hinders the growth of their language. Because of their semi-nomadic, semi-reclusive nature, large clans are not easily supported. However, on the other hand it is their close association with their traditional ways that ensures the transfer of language and culture from one generation to the next.

== Language revival ==
As of 2020, "Djinang/Wurlaki" is listed as one of 20 languages prioritised as part of the Priority Languages Support Project, being undertaken by First Languages Australia and funded by the Department of Communications and the Arts. The project aims to "identify and document critically-endangered languages – those languages for which little or no documentation exists, where no recordings have previously been made, but where there are living speakers".

== Sources ==
- Capell, A. (1979). "The History of Australian Languages: a First Approach" (PDF). Australian Linguistic Studies. C54: 419–619. doi:10.15144/PL-C54.419.
- Harvey, Mark (2011). "Lexical change in pre-colonial Australia". Diachronica. 28 (3): 345–381. doi:10.1075/dia.28.3.03har.
- Keen, Ian (1995). "Metaphor and the Metalanguage: 'Groups' in Northeast Arnhem Land". American Ethnologist. 22 (3): 502–527. doi:10.1525/ae.1995.22.3.02a00030. JSTOR 645969.
- Koch, Harold (2007). "An overview of Australian traditional languages" (PDF). In Leitner, Gerhard; Malcolm, Ian G. (eds.). The Habitat of Australia's Aboriginal Languages: Past, Present and Future. Walter de Gruyter. pp. 23–56. ISBN 978-3-11-019079-3.
- Lewis, Paul M.; Simons, Gary F.; Fennig, Charles D. (2013). Ethnologue: Languages of the World (17 ed.). Dallas, Texas: SIL International.
- Waters, Bruce (1979). A Distinctive Features Approach to Djinang Phonology and Verb Morphology (PDF). Work Papers of SIL-AAB, A:4. Darwin: Summer Institute of Linguistics. ISBN 0-86892-205-6.
- Waters, Bruce (October 1983). An interim Djinang dictionary (PDF). Work Papers of SIL-AAB, B:9. Summer Institute of Linguistics. ISBN 0-86892-270-6.
- Waters, Bruce (1989). Djinang and Djinba: a grammatical and historical perspective (PDF). Pacific Linguistics C 114. Canberra: Australian National University. ISBN 0-85883-392-1.
