= Willie Gudabi =

Painter

Willie Gudabi (c. 1916–1996), also known as Willie Gudapi and Willie Gudupi, was an Aboriginal Australian painter of the Alawa people, whose body of work, mostly painted in Ngukurr between 1987 and 1995, features personal ancestral culture and sacred history.

== Personal history ==
Willie Gudabi was born in Alawa country on Nutwood Downs Station around 1916, west of Mara country and due south of the Roper River. This was during the time of contact history, shortly after the massacres by European settlers. Although the Aboriginal people in the Roper region endured colonial destruction and control, important Aboriginal rituals survived and were passed down through ceremonial men in the community, like Willie Gudabi, who later in his life regularly conducted initiation and mortuary ceremonies.

Willie Gudabi worked in a humpy in the bush, then on the pastoral stations of Etsey, Hodgson Downs, Roper Valley, and Tanumbirini. He spent time on the Mission, and drove in Queensland with bullocks and cattle. Finally, he was made head stockman at Hodgson Downs. During this time, he was also initiated into traditional Aboriginal ceremonies.

Willie Gudabi married Moima Willie, a Ngalakan/Ngandi woman at the Mission.

== Artistic training ==
After many years of work in stock camps, Guabdi's health began to decline, so in the early 1980s, he started carving boomerangs to supplement his pension. Willie Gudabi moved to Ngukurr to continue crafting as a way to generate income.

Upset with the breakdown of traditions and lacking a means to pass along culture, Willie Gudabi joined a screen-printing workshop in Ngukurr in 1987 conducted by Edie Kurzer, a young visiting artist from Sydney, Australia. After completing the workshop, Willie Gudabi stayed with the printmaking group until 1988 at the open-air Beat Street Art Center.

Willie Gudabi was instrumental in the development of Ngukurr art. In Ngukurr, Willie Gudabi lobbied on behalf of the Ngundungunya Association to build a permanent art center. It would be years later before a more permanent art center was established and completed.

Willie Gudabi's first solo art show featuring his representational-style paintings was held at Beverly Knight's Alcaston House Gallery in Melbourne on November 22, 1988, where two of his paintings were sold. Beverly Knight continued to show Willie Gudabi's works, along with those of his wife, Moima Willie. By the mid-1990s, Willie Gudabi's works were in high demand.

== Artistic inspiration and works ==
"[Willie Gudabi's] body of work represents more than renderings of country and ancestor beings. It is also a secret personal history in which biographical and historical details are as much a part of the work as they are for many western artists. These elements combine with the sacred and the ceremonial to create a distinct painted world or more truly worlds within worlds, which operate on many layers and of which he is a part."

Aboriginal people have lived in Australia for thousands of generations as hunter-gatherer nomadic clans. The individual clans have deep cultural and spiritual ties, yet their connection with the ancestral world and cosmology unites the clans. However, beginning in 1770, British explorers landed on the southeastern shore of Arnhem Land, and a cultural obliteration began – subjecting Aboriginals to massacres, disease, forced integration, and the breakdown of Aboriginal traditions, including some forms of art and expression. Today, less than four percent of the Australian population are Aboriginals. Despite the European destruction, the world's longest enduring religion and longest continuing art form, rock art, was passed down regardless of the decline in population. Rock art is identified by the cross-hatched (rarrk) and dot-patterned painting styles found in Australia at more than 100,000 sites, namely shelters and caves. The cross-hatching and dotting are styles taken from ceremonial body painting traditions and are thought to have ancestral energy and properties.

Willie Gudabi was deeply connected to his country, ancestors, and ceremonies, as well as their depictions in ancient Aboriginal rock art. He "was obsessed with rock art in his country." The themes of the "pastoral industry and the intensive occupation by frontier pastoralists" feature prominently in Willie Gudabi's paintings. It has been noted that there are stylistic parallels with Willie Gudabi's paintings and those of the Alawa rock art, including the appearance of palimpsests (paintings within paintings and layered areas over one another), broad use of figures surrounded by dotted outlines, and the overall impression of overlapping fields and simultaneous action. Willie Gudabi also took inspiration from the ways that cave art gives the appearance of tricks of light, evoking a similar sense of depth in his paintings with elements of light and dark.

Willie Gudabi was an early advocate of the movement of creating art for those outside Arnhem Land. He highlighted ceremonies in his work, specifically those of initiation and mortuary. The richness and depth of Willie Gudabi's paintings include subject matter of flora, weapons, tools and depictions of ancestors – in both human and animal forms. The different sections within Willie Gudabi's paintings divide his narrative both figuratively, isolating the various parts of the story, and geographically, defining tangible clan estate boundaries. Willie Gudabi's work has been compared to that of the Yolngu bark painters, where action takes place across sections within the overall composition.

Willie Gudabi's work has been described as "a micro view looking down onto the ground, concentrating on a plethora of creatures that inhabit specific tracts of country and the ceremony that they enact. Everything is represented from the smallest to the most significant: the ants, the birds, the butterflies, the mosquitoes, the scorpions, the crustaceans, the wallaby, the goanna, a host of medicinal plants, spirit figures and the mysterious figure of Gudang. None of them are random or decorative and all have a role to play in his complex scenarios, which depict preparations and enactments of ceremony."

The cast of characters in Willie Gudabi and Moima Willie's co-created paintings is substantial, and time and place are intricately interwoven. In these shared paintings, there is a huge repertoire of ancestral spirits, such as bull ants and rainbow serpents. The canvases depict multiple events, telling stories of fights, epic battles, love, murder, song cycles, dreamings, and even the theft of ritual food.

Willie Gudabi used complementary colors and stark contrasts to create visually distinctive paintings, and his color selections indicated the time of year. For example, the wet season was expressed with lush greens while the dry season was illustrated with sombre-colored ochres. His use of bright and a diverse color palette is shared among other Ngukurr artists.

Willie Gudabi's "grandfather", a legend known as Gudang, is featured significantly in his paintings and represents the so-called "wild blacks" who refused to join pastoral stations and remained living a traditional life deep in the bush. Like his grandfather, Willie Gudabi also had the freedom and autonomy to live in country. It is unclear whether Gudang was a mythical, ancestral being or the actual last wild Alawa man who was a custodian of rock art sites. It is likely that Gudang may have been Willie Gudabi's uncle, his father's brother. Regardless of whether he was purely myth or an actual man, Gudang shaped Willie Gudabi's paintings and often inspired the subject matter of his works.

Willie Gudabi's works contain not only enactments of ceremony, but they are vignettes layered with ancestral stories. One example, as detailed by Robert Layton, is where Willie Gudabi interpreted stories of his Alawa forebearers seeing cart tracks on the 1870s stock route from Queensland to the Northern Territory at the Hodgson River. His ancestors, having never seen a wheeled vehicle, believed the tracks imprints were those of an enormous snake.

Willie Gudabi's work communicates a sense of urgency because he started painting later in life and was motivated to document stories and traditions to pass down to future generations.

== Artistic influence ==
Willie Gudabi's influence on other painters includes at least the following: Moima Samuels Willie (Gudabi's wife) and Gertie Huddleston. Willie Gudabi's works have been compared with other Ngukurr artists such as Edward Blitner. There are stylistic comparisons with Gertie Huddleston, who watched Willie Gudabi and Moima Willie paint.

== Collections ==
Art Gallery of New South Wales

Kluge-Ruhe Aboriginal Art Collection of the University of Virginia

National Gallery of Australia

National Gallery of Victoria
