= Buckingham River =

Buckingham
- Location of the Buckingham River mouth in the Northern Territory

Location
- Country: Australia
- Territory: Northern Territory

Physical characteristics
- Source: Mitchell Ranges
  - location: Arnhem Land, Australia
  - elevation: 75 m (246 ft)
- Mouth: Buckingham Bay
  - location: Australia
  - coordinates: 12°19′41″S 135°43′46″E
  - elevation: 0 m (0 ft)
- Length: 59 km (37 mi)
- Basin size: 7,510 km^{2} (2,900 sq mi)
- Discharge
  - average: 73.8 m^{3}/s (2,610 cu ft/s)

Buckingham River is a river in the Northern Territory of Australia.

The headwaters of the river are on the northern edge on the eastern side of the Mitchell Ranges near where the Central Arnhem Road crosses the Range. The river flows in a northerly direction though uninhabited country until it discharges into Buckingham Bay and the Arafura Sea.

The estuary formed at the river mouth is tidal in nature and in near pristine condition.

The catchment area of the river is 7,510 square kilometres (2,900 sq mi) and has an annual average discharge of 2,330 gigalitres (3.047524943×10^{9} cu yd).

The traditional owners of the area are the Murngin also known as the Yolngu peoples. The Aboriginal community of Gapuwiyak still has supplies taken by barge up the river to be delivered. The community is 20 kilometres (12 mi) by road from the landing.

== See also ==
- List of rivers of Australia § Northern Territory
