= Milingimbi Island =

Island in Northern Territory, Australia

A wooden bandicoot collected at Milingimbi Island

Milingimbi Island, also Yurruwi, is the largest island of the Crocodile Islands group off the coast of Arnhem Land, Northern Territory, Australia.

== Geography ==
Milingimbi lies approximately 440 kilometres (270 mi) east of Darwin and 200 kilometres (120 mi) west of Nhulunbuy.

=== Climate ===
Milingimbi has a tropical savanna climate (Köppen: Aw) with a wet season from November to April and a dry season from May to October. On average, the island experiences 87.1 clear days and 92.8 cloudy days per annum. Extreme temperatures ranged from 39.6 °C (103.3 °F) on 24 November 1975 to 8.9 °C (48.0 °F) on 20 July 1965. The wettest recorded day was 19 April 1964 with 264.9 mm (10.43 in) of rainfall.

The Milingimbi weather station recorded climate data for temperature, precipitation, solar exposure, 9 am conditions and 3 pm conditions. It was closed in 2003.

Climate data for Milingimbi (12.12°S 134.91°E) (4 m (13 ft) AMSL) (1923-2003)
Month	Jan	Feb	Mar	Apr	May	Jun	Jul	Aug	Sep	Oct	Nov	Dec	Year
Record high °C (°F)	37.0 (98.6)	38.8 (101.8)	35.2 (95.4)	35.6 (96.1)	35.6 (96.1)	34.7 (94.5)	32.0 (89.6)	33.9 (93.0)	35.0 (95.0)	36.7 (98.1)	39.6 (103.3)	38.0 (100.4)	39.6 (103.3)
Mean daily maximum °C (°F)	32.1 (89.8)	31.6 (88.9)	31.5 (88.7)	31.8 (89.2)	31.0 (87.8)	29.4 (84.9)	28.9 (84.0)	29.9 (85.8)	31.3 (88.3)	32.6 (90.7)	33.6 (92.5)	33.3 (91.9)	31.4 (88.5)
Mean daily minimum °C (°F)	24.5 (76.1)	24.4 (75.9)	24.2 (75.6)	23.5 (74.3)	22.0 (71.6)	19.6 (67.3)	18.4 (65.1)	19.2 (66.6)	21.1 (70.0)	23.2 (73.8)	24.7 (76.5)	25.0 (77.0)	22.5 (72.5)
Record low °C (°F)	18.0 (64.4)	19.5 (67.1)	18.3 (64.9)	17.4 (63.3)	11.7 (53.1)	10.8 (51.4)	8.9 (48.0)	11.0 (51.8)	13.9 (57.0)	15.0 (59.0)	17.7 (63.9)	16.7 (62.1)	8.9 (48.0)
Average precipitation mm (inches)	253.2 (9.97)	237.5 (9.35)	251.4 (9.90)	115.2 (4.54)	21.7 (0.85)	6.7 (0.26)	1.8 (0.07)	0.8 (0.03)	1.1 (0.04)	10.9 (0.43)	49.1 (1.93)	176.4 (6.94)	1,116.2 (43.94)
Average precipitation days (≥ 0.2 mm)	15.9	16.1	16.6	9.5	3.4	1.0	0.5	0.3	0.4	1.3	4.8	10.3	80.1
Average afternoon relative humidity (%)	73	75	72	66	62	61	59	57	57	58	60	65	64
Average dew point °C (°F)	24.7 (76.5)	24.8 (76.6)	24.1 (75.4)	23.0 (73.4)	21.6 (70.9)	19.7 (67.5)	18.9 (66.0)	19.0 (66.2)	20.5 (68.9)	21.9 (71.4)	23.2 (73.8)	24.0 (75.2)	22.1 (71.8)
Source: Bureau of Meteorology (1923-2003)

A newer weather station at the airport was open in 2003. It records temperature, precipitation and solar exposure.

Climate data for Milingimbi Airport (12.09°S 134.89°E) (15 m (49 ft) AMSL) (2003-2025)
Month	Jan	Feb	Mar	Apr	May	Jun	Jul	Aug	Sep	Oct	Nov	Dec	Year
Record high °C (°F)	37.6 (99.7)	37.4 (99.3)	38.7 (101.7)	35.8 (96.4)	35.2 (95.4)	35.0 (95.0)	34.3 (93.7)	35.0 (95.0)	36.6 (97.9)	38.1 (100.6)	37.8 (100.0)	39.5 (103.1)	39.5 (103.1)
Mean daily maximum °C (°F)	33.0 (91.4)	32.8 (91.0)	32.6 (90.7)	32.4 (90.3)	32.1 (89.8)	30.9 (87.6)	30.6 (87.1)	31.1 (88.0)	32.1 (89.8)	33.2 (91.8)	34.0 (93.2)	33.9 (93.0)	32.4 (90.3)
Mean daily minimum °C (°F)	25.5 (77.9)	25.3 (77.5)	25.1 (77.2)	24.0 (75.2)	22.5 (72.5)	20.2 (68.4)	19.3 (66.7)	19.3 (66.7)	21.5 (70.7)	23.9 (75.0)	25.5 (77.9)	26.0 (78.8)	23.2 (73.7)
Record low °C (°F)	20.1 (68.2)	20.5 (68.9)	21.3 (70.3)	19.6 (67.3)	15.2 (59.4)	10.0 (50.0)	11.2 (52.2)	12.1 (53.8)	14.2 (57.6)	18.3 (64.9)	20.7 (69.3)	22.3 (72.1)	10.0 (50.0)
Average precipitation mm (inches)	294.7 (11.60)	243.4 (9.58)	261.1 (10.28)	135.0 (5.31)	24.5 (0.96)	5.3 (0.21)	2.3 (0.09)	1.6 (0.06)	7.2 (0.28)	9.6 (0.38)	57.7 (2.27)	187.7 (7.39)	1,217 (47.91)
Average precipitation days (≥ 0.2 mm)	16.0	14.8	17.0	12.1	5.3	1.3	1.0	0.4	0.8	1.7	4.9	10.4	85.7
Source: Bureau of Meteorology (2003-2025)

== History ==
Aboriginal people have occupied the area for more than 40,000 years. It was an important ritual centre for the great ceremonies conducted by the Indigenous inhabitants. The Yan-nhangu-speaking Yolngu people are the traditional owners of Milingimbi and its surrounding seas and islands. In 1923, the Methodist Overseas Mission established a mission on the island, which attracted Aboriginal people from eastern clan groups. They included Gupapuyŋu- and Djambarrpuyŋu-, as well as Wangurri- and Warramirri-speaking people. Thomas Theodor Webb (1885–1948) headed the mission in the 1920s.

The island was bombed by the Japanese during World War II and most of its population moved to nearby Elcho Island. After the war, the island continued to be used as a Royal Australian Air Force base, before the missionaries returned in 1951.

Edgar Almond Wells was superintendent at the mission in the 1950s. Like Webb before him, he was interested in the Yolngu people's art, not only for the income it brought to the mission when sold, but also as means to better understand the Indigenous people's culture. The Musée d'ethnographie de Genève in Switzerland holds a wooden carving of a cormorant (wurran), a clan totem collected by Wells.

The mission administered the island until 1974, after which management was transferred to Milingimbi Community Incorporated. In 2008 Milingimbi, became part of the East Arnhem Regional Council, which took over local government.

== Language ==
English is a second, third or fourth language for most Aboriginal residents of Milingimbi. A successful bilingual program of the Milingimbi CEC, started in 1974, was stopped. Bilingual education continues on some of the surrounding outstations, run by traditional owners concerned to support the linguistic, cultural and biological diversity of the Crocodile Islands. To that end, the Yan-nhangu traditional owners have started the volunteer Crocodile Islands Rangers project to promote sustainable livelihood activities for local people in local languages.

== Facilities ==
The island has its own airfield, Milingimbi Airport, with the airport call-sign YMGB, and is also the site of a Bureau of Meteorology weather station. The island also has its own ALPA (Arnhem Land Progress Aboriginal Corporation) store, post office and an art gallery. Milingimbi has a community library serviced by East Arnhem Regional Council.

== Notable people ==
- Binyinyuwuy Djarrankuykuy was a leading Aboriginal artist from the island of Milingimbi. His works are held in major museums around the world.
- Tom Djäwa, an artist and community leader and elder, was part of recordings that appeared on the Voyager Golden Record, along with Mudpo and Waliparu.
- Artist David Malangi attended school at Milingimbi in his childhood.
- According to one account, the noted didgeridoo maker and player, Djalu Gurruwiwi, was born at Milingimbi.
- Northern Territory senior Australian of the Year 2012, Laurie Baymarrwangga, was the senior djungaya (manager) of Milingimbi Island. She was awarded the 2011 Northern Territory Innovation and Research Award for her projects, including the development of a Yan-nhaŋu Dictionary (1994–2012) and her work with the Crocodile Islands Rangers. In 1935, Baymarrwangga was photographed by Donald Thomson at Milingimbi and at Murrungga.
- Danzal Baker (known professionally as 'Baker Boy') is an influential music artist hailing from Milingimbi

== Sources ==
- Baymarrwangga, Laurie; James, Bentley; Lydon, Jane (2014). "'The Myalls' ultimatum': Photography and Yolgnu in Eastern Arnhem Land, 1917". In Lydon, Jane (ed.). Calling the Shots: Aboriginal Photographies. Aboriginal Studies Press. pp. 254–272. ISBN 978-1-922-05959-8.
- Betts, Alyssa (31 May 2016). "Remembering the bombing of Milingimbi". ABC News.
- Daley, Paul (17 December 2015). "Gurruwiwi, a living Yolngu legend". The Guardian.
- James, Bentley (2009). Time and Tide: in the Crocodile Islands: Change and Continuity in Yan-hnaŋu Marine Identity (PDF) (Doctoral thesis). Australian National University.
- James, Bentley (2015). "The Language of 'Spiritual Power': From Mana to Märr on the Crocodile Islands" (PDF). In Toner, Peter (ed.). North Australian Indigenous in Strings of Connectedness: Essays in Honour of Ian Keen. Australian National University. pp. 235–261.
- Keen, Ian (2005) [First published 1990]. "Ecological community and species attributes in Yolnghu religious symbolism". In Willis, Roy (ed.). Signifying Animals: Human Meaning in the Natural World. Routledge. pp. 80–96. ISBN 0-203-26481-9.
- "Milingimbi". East Arnhem Land Regional Council. 2015.
- Mundine, Djon (2015). "No Ordinary Place – The Art of David Malangi". National Gallery of Australia.
- Tindale, Norman Barnett (1974). "Djinang (NT)". Aboriginal Tribes of Australia: Their Terrain, Environmental Controls, Distribution, Limits, and Proper Names. Australian National University. ISBN 978-0-708-10741-6.
