= W. Lloyd Warner =

US-american anthropologist and sociologist

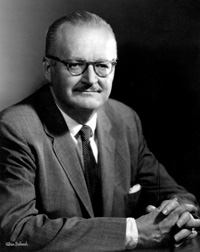
- W. Lloyd Warner
- Born: William Lloyd Warner; October 26, 1898; Redlands, California, U.S.
- Died: May 23, 1970 (aged 71); Chicago, Illinois, U.S.
- Scientific career
- Fields: Anthropology, sociology
- Workplaces: University of Chicago; Harvard University
- Doctoral students: Kingsley Davis; Erving Goffman

William Lloyd Warner (October 26, 1898 – May 23, 1970) was an American anthropologist and sociologist noted for applying the techniques of British functionalism to understanding American culture.

== Background ==
William Lloyd Warner was born in Redlands, California, into the family of William Taylor and Clara Belle Carter, middle-class farmers. Warner attended San Bernardino High School, after which he joined the army in 1917. He contracted tuberculosis in 1918 and was released from the service. In 1918, he married Billy Overfield, but the marriage lasted only briefly.

Warner enrolled in the University of California, Berkeley, where he studied English and became associated with the Socialist Party.

In 1921, he transferred to New York to pursue a career in acting. The plan did not work well, and Warner returned to Berkeley to complete his studies in English.

At Berkeley, he met Robert H. Lowie, a professor of anthropology, who encouraged him to turn to anthropology. Warner became fascinated by the work of Bronislaw Malinowski and A. R. Radcliffe-Brown, who introduced him to the British functionalist approach to social anthropology. He also developed friendships with anthropologists Alfred L. Kroeber and Theodora Kroeber. Warner received his degree of Bachelor of Arts from Berkeley in 1925.

== Research in Australia ==
From 1926 to 1929, Warner spent three years as a researcher for the Rockefeller Foundation and the Australian National Research Council, studying the Murngin people of Arnhem Land in northern Australia with his base at the Milingimbi Methodist Mission. He formed a deep friendship with Mahkarolla, his main Murngin informant, whom he described in an appendix to his 1947 book. From 1929 to 1935, Warner studied at Harvard in the Department of Anthropology and the Business School, trying to obtain his Ph.D. He used his study among Murngin for his dissertation, which was later published in his first book, A Black Civilization: A Social Study of an Australian Tribe (1937). He never defended the thesis, and accordingly, did not receive his doctoral degree.

While at Harvard, Warner taught at the Graduate School of Business Administration. From 1930 to 1935, he conducted his most influential study, which was known by the name The Yankee City Project. In 1932, he married Mildred Hall, with whom he had three children.

== Career at Harvard ==
Warner enrolled at Harvard (1929–1935) as a graduate student in the Department of Anthropology and the Graduate School of Business School Administration. His first book, A Black Civilization: A Social Study of an Australian Tribe (1937), followed the conventional anthropological path of studying so-called "primitive people."

During his years at Harvard, he became a member of a group of social scientists, led by Australian social psychologist Elton Mayo, the presumed father of the Human Relations Movement and also best known for his discovery of the so-called Hawthorne Effect (which in fact is widely contested) in the course of his motivational research at the Western Electric Company. Mayo (who was in fact the figurehead of an investigation team composed of T.N. Whitehead, F.J. Roethlisberger, W. J. Dickson, and others) was exploring the social and psychological dimensions of industrial settings and stimulated Warner's interest in contemporary society. Warner became involved in Mayo's project of studying the workplace and organizational structure using the Western Electric Hawthorne plant in Chicago as its location. Warner's contribution consisted of the introduction of anthropological techniques of observation and interviewing, an innovation that helped cultural explanations to emerge from data analysis. He was largely responsible for the design of the third phase of the Hawthorne project known as the Bank Wiring Observation Room (BWOR) which examined how workers actually performed their jobs, as opposed to what they stated they would do during interviews.

== Career in Chicago ==
In 1935, he was appointed professor of anthropology and sociology at the University of Chicago, where he remained until 1959, when he was appointed professor of social research at Michigan State University. During his Chicago years, Warner's research included important studies of black communities in Chicago and the rural South, of a New England community ("Yankee City"/Newburyport, MA), and a Midwestern community ("Jonesville" was Morris, Illinois). In addition to these community studies, Warner researched business leaders and government administrators, as well as producing important books on race, religion, and American society.

Warner's Yankee City study lasted nearly a decade and produced 5 volumes: The Social Life of a Modern Community (1941), The Status System of a Modern Community (1942), The Social Systems of American Ethnic Groups (1945), The Social System of a Modern Factory (1947), and The Living and the Dead: A Study in the Symbolic Life of Americans (1959).

== Criticisms ==
Despite his impressive productivity and wide range of interests, Warner's work has long been out of fashion. The noted Marxist sociologist Oliver Cromwell Cox's vigorous critique of Warner's framing of race in the Southern US as caste contributed to the disappearance of this once-fashionable conception. An empiricist in an era when the social disciplines were increasingly theoretical, fascinated with economic and social inequality in a time when Americans were eager to deny its significance, and implicitly skeptical of the possibilities of legislating social change at a time when many social scientists were eager to be policymakers, Warner's focus on uncomfortable subjects made his work unfashionable. Warner's interest in communities (when the social science mainstream was stressing the importance of urbanization) and religion (when the fields' leaders were aggressively secularist) also helped to marginalize his work. More positive assessments of his work have recently emerged.

== Bibliography ==
- Warner, W. Lloyd. 1967. The Emergent American Society.
- Warner, W. Lloyd. 1963. The American Federal Executive: A Study of the Social and Personal Characteristics of the Civil Service.
- Warner, W. Lloyd. 1963. Big Business Leaders in America.
- Warner, W. Lloyd. 1962. The Corporation in the Emergent American Society.
- Warner, W. Lloyd. 1961. The Family of God: A Symbolic Study of Christian Life in America.
- Warner, W. Lloyd. 1960. Social class in America: A Manual of Procedure for the Measurement of Social Status.
- Warner, W. Lloyd. 1959. The Living and the Dead: A Study of the Symbolic Life of Americans.
- Warner, W. Lloyd (ed.). 1959. Industrial Man: Businessmen and Business Organizations.
- Warner, W. Lloyd. 1955. Big Business Leaders in America,
- Warner, W. Lloyd. 1955. Occupational Mobility in American Business and Industry, 1928–1952.
- Warner, W. Lloyd. 1953. American Life: Dream and Reality.
- Warner, W. Lloyd. 1952. Structure of American Life.
- Warner, W. Lloyd. 1949. Democracy in Jonesville; A Study of Quality and Inequality.
- Warner, W. Lloyd. 1949. Social Class in America: A Manual of Procedure for the Measurement of Social Status.
- Warner, W. Lloyd. 1948. The Radio Day Time Serial: A Symbolic Analysis.
- Warner, W. Lloyd. 1947. The Social System of the Modern Factory. The Strike: A Social Analysis.
- Warner, W. Lloyd. 1946. Who Shall Be Educated? The Challenge of Unequal Opportunities.
- Warner, W. Lloyd. 1945. The Social Systems of American Ethnic Groups.
- Warner, W. Lloyd. 1944. Who Shall Be Educated? The Challenge of Unequal Opportunities.
- Warner, W. Lloyd. 1942. The Status System of a Modern Community.
- Warner, W. Lloyd. 1941. Color and Human Nature: Negro Personality Development in a Northern City.
- Warner, W. Lloyd. 1937. A Black Civilization: A Social Study of an Australian Tribe.
- Warner, W. Lloyd. 1933. Methodology and Field Research in Africa. Africa: Journal of the International African Institute, Vol. 6, No. 1, pp. 51-58
- Warner, W. Lloyd. 1931. Morphology and Functions of the Australian Murngin Type of Kinship (Part II), American Anthropologist, New Series, Vol. 33, No. 1, pp. 172-198.
- Warner, W. Lloyd. 1930. Morphology and Functions of the Australian Murngin Type of Kinship (Part I), American Anthropologist, New Series, Vol. 32, No. 2, pp. 207-256.

== Associated references ==
- Easton, John. 2001. Consuming Interests. University of Chicago Magazine 93(6)
- Marquand, John P. 1939. Wickford Point.
- Marquand, John P. 1947. Point of No Return. (one of the novel character represents Lloyd Warner

== Sources ==
- Abraham, Priya E. (2016). Cyberconnecting: The Three Lenses of Diversity. Routledge. ISBN 978-1-317-15523-2.
- Robinson, Gary W. (2004). "Living in Sheds, Suicide, Friendship and Research Among the Tiwi". In Hume, Lynne; Mulcock, Jane (eds.). Anthropologists in the Field: Cases in Participant Observation. Columbia University Press. pp. 153–167. ISBN 978-0-231-13005-9.
- Hamby, Louise (2008). "The Forgotten Collections Baskets reveal history". In Peterson, Nicolas; Allen, Lindy; Hamby, Louise (eds.). The Makers and Making of Indigenous Australian Museum Collections. Academic Monographs. pp. 355–385. ISBN 978-0-522-85568-5.
- Hamby, Louise (2011). "The Forgotten Collections Baskets reveal history". In Thomas, Martin; Neale, Margo (eds.). Exploring the Legacy of the 1948 Arnhem Land Expedition. Australian National University. pp. 213–237. ISBN 978-1-921-66645-2.
- Kirby, Neil; Kummerow, Elizabeth (2013). Organisational Culture. World Scientific. ISBN 978-9-814-52510-7.
- McCracken, Grant David (1990) [First published 1988]. "Ever dearer in our thoughts: patina and the representation of status before and after the 18th century". Culture and Consumption: New Approaches to the Symbolic Character of Consumer Goods and Activities. Indiana University Press. ISBN 978-0-253-20628-2.
- Mulvaney, D. J. (1990). Warner, William Lloyd (1898–1970). Australian Dictionary of Biography. Vol. 12. Melbourne University Press.
- "Prof. W. Lloyd Warner Dead; Known for Class Status Work". The New York Times. May 24, 1970. p. 81.
- Sharp, R. Lauriston (1939). "Review: W. Lloyd Warner, A Black Civilization: a Social Study of an Australian Tribe". American Anthropologist. 41 (1): 150–152. doi:10.1525/aa.1939.41.1.02a00250.
- Tindale, Norman Barnett (1974). "Murngin (NT)". Aboriginal Tribes of Australia: Their Terrain, Environmental Controls, Distribution, Limits, and Proper Names. Australian National University. ISBN 978-0-708-10741-6. Archived from the original on November 15, 2019.
