= Crocodile Islands =

Archipelago of the Northern Territory, Australia

- Location within Northern Territory

Geography
- Location: Off Arnhem Land, in the Arafura Sea
- Coordinates: 11°56′02″S 135°04′41″E

Administration
- Australia
- State: Northern Territory

The Crocodile Islands are a group of islands belonging to the Yan-nhaŋu people of the Northern Territory of Australia. They are located off the coast of Arnhem Land in the Arafura Sea.

As of 2023 the Crocodile Islands are protected as part of the National Reserve System as a protected area called the Crocodile Islands Maringa Indigenous Protected Area (IPA).

== List of islands ==
=== Larger islands ===
- Milingimbi Island, in the local language Yurruwi, is the largest of the inner islands in the group
- Murrungga (Mooroongga), the largest of the outer Crocodile islands, and the birthplace of Laurie Baymarrwangga, the last fluent speaker of Yan-nhangu.
- Rapuma (Yabooma)
- Gananggananggarr (Gananggaringur)
- Nilpaywa (Crocodile Island).

=== Smaller islands ===
- Darbada.
- Boojiragi (Budjirriki)
- Mardanaingura.
- Northwest Crocodile (Gurriba)
- North-east Crocodile Islands (Brul-brul)
- North-west Crocodile Reef (Gununba No 1).

== History ==
The islands were formed by stabilising sea levels 5000 years before present. They were discovered by the Dutch in the seventeenth century and named the Crocodils Eÿlandt. Several of the Crocodile Islands, with their associated mudflats, have been identified by BirdLife International as forming the Milingimbi Islands Important Bird Area (IBA) because they support large numbers of waders, or shorebirds. Murrungga Island has one of the most significant migratory bird nesting and breeding sites in the North of Australia. The enormous fresh water lakes of Garratha, Riyanhuna and Ganbuwa are home to hundreds of species of birds, as well as a large population of Saltwater Crocodiles, after which the islands are named.

== Access ==
Access to the islands is restricted; before visiting, permission must be sought from the appropriate land council.

== See also ==
- List of islands of Australia

== Sources ==
- Baymarrwangga, Laurie; James and, Bentley; Lydon, Jane (2014). "'The Myalls' ultimatum': Photography and Yolgnu in Eastern Arnhem Land, 1917". In Lydon, Jane (ed.). Calling the Shots: Aboriginal Photographies. Aboriginal Studies Press. pp. 254–272. ISBN 978-1-922-05959-8.
- "IBA: Miligimbi Islands". Birdata. Birds Australia.
- James, Bentley (2009). Time and Tide: in the Crocodile Islands: Change and Continuity in Yan-hnaŋu Marine Identity (PDF) (Doctoral thesis). Australian National University.
- Marlow, Karina (11 November 2015). "Crocodile Islands documentary wins UN Media Peace Award". NITV.
- Tindale, Norman Barnett (1974). "Djinang (NT)". Aboriginal Tribes of Australia: Their Terrain, Environmental Controls, Distribution, Limits, and Proper Names. Australian National University. ISBN 978-0-708-10741-6.
