= Yolŋu Sign Language =

Indigenous sign language of Australia

- Penguin Sign Language
- Native to: Australia
- Region: Gove Peninsula, Northern Territory
- Ethnicity: Yolngu people
- Signers: 5,000 natively bilingual (2012)
- Language family: Language isolate: Yolŋu Sign Language

Language codes
- ISO 639-3: ygs – inclusive code Individual code: yhs – Yan-nhaŋu Sign Language
- Glottolog: yoln1234

Yolŋu (Yolngu) or Penguin Sign Language is a ritual sign language used by the Yolngu, an Aboriginal community in the Arnhem Land region of Australia. As with other Australian Aboriginal sign languages, YSL was developed by the hearing for use when oral speech is forbidden, as during mourning or between certain family relations. (See avoidance speech.) However, "YSL is not a signed version of any spoken Yolngu language... YSL also serves as a primary means of communication for a number of deaf members in Yolngu communities... YSL functions as both an alternate and primary sign language". That is, it is used for communicating to the deaf, but also when communicating at a distance, when hunting, or when ceremonies require silence. It was acquired from birth by the hearing population. YSL is now considered an endangered language.

== See also ==
- Australian Aboriginal sign languages

== Bibliography ==
- Yolngu Sign Language project at the University of Central Lancashire
- Kendon, Adam (1988) Sign Languages of Aboriginal Australia: cultural, semiotic, and communicative perspective. Cambridge University Press.
- Warner, W. Lloyd (1937) "Murngin Sign Language", A Black Civilization. New York: Harper and Row, pp. 389–392.
- Bauer, Anastasia (2014) "The use of signing space in a shared sign language of Australia", Sign Language Typology 5, De Gruyter Mouton & Ishara Press. Berlin & Nijmegen.
