= Mitchell Ranges =

Australian mountain range

Coordinates: 13°04′45″S 135°30′13″E

Mitchell Ranges are a mountain range in Arnhem Land located approximately 510 kilometres (317 mi) east of Darwin in the Northern Territory, of Australia.

The Range is approximately 115 kilometres (71 mi) long running from north to south with a width of approximately 15 kilometres (9 mi). Several peaks are found within the range including; Mount Parson, Mount Fleming, Mount Ramsay and Mount Fawcett. The Parson Range is in the sound of the range.

The rocks that make up the range are Proterozoic sedimentary and include pebbly sandstones, moderately folded quartz sandstone, feldspathic sandstone and arkose.
