= Marra people =

Aboriginal people of the Northern Territory of Australia

The Marra, formerly sometimes referred to as Mara, are an Aboriginal Australian people of the Northern Territory.

== Language ==
Multilingualism was the norm in pre-contact Aboriginal Australia, though one's primary group identity was formed by the specific tongue that inscribed the landscape where any group habitually controlled. Marra is one of the three members of the Marran language family, together with Warndarrang (Note: Warndarrang may be borderline since some linguists regard it as, alternatively, a fringe member of the Macro-Gunwinyguan language family.) and Alawa, a typology established by Stephen Wurm in 1971. Arthur Capell included it as a new example of a semi-classifying language in 1942. (Note: 'A new sub-group has been created, occupied by the Mara language, together with Alawa. These languages have a feminine for the demonstratives and the pronoun, and Alawa also for certain verb forms, but they make no agreement in the adjective. This sub-group has been denominated "semi-classifying", because it has thus the elements of the dual- classifying group, but they are not fully developed, as e.g. in Nagara.') It is notable for having 8 conjugation classes, and a further 21 sub-conjugation classes for just twice that number of inflecting verbs.

According to Greg Dickson, Marra, which is "critically endangered" with only four completely fluent speakers (2015), has played a key role in the formation of the Roper River variety of Kriol.

== Country ==
Marra lands, in Norman Tindale's reckoning, covered some 3,000 square miles (7,800 km^{2}) from the tidal reaches of the Roper River to an area close to the mouth of the Hodgson River. The southern extension ran to the Limmen Bight River. The eastern flanks ran to the coast and Maria Island, while to the north they extended as far as Edward Island. The neighbouring tribes of the Marra were the Yanyuwa to the east, the Alawa on their southern frontier, the Mangarayi to the west, the Warndarang to the north (with the border around the Roper River) and formerly, perhaps the Yugul resided to their northwest.

== Social organisation ==
Alfred Radcliffe-Brown used the Mara social organisation as a type for classifying a semi-moiety structure typical of the area's tribes. He described the Mara as characterised by patrilineal moieties each of which had two semi-moieties and designated them in the following pattern.

Moiety	semi-moiety
Muluri	Murrungun
Muluri	Mambali
Umbana	Burdal
Umbana	Guyal

Lauriston Sharp describes this as follows:

This general type of social organization is now known as the Mara type, after one of the tribes in the area. The kinship structure of these tribes is of the Central Australian Aranda type in which the kin are grouped into four patrilineal lines of descent stemming from the father's father, father's mother's brother, mother's father, and mother's mother's brother. In the grouping of the kin into larger divisions under this Mara type of organization, the father's father's and mother's mother's brother's lineages together form one named patrilineal moiety, while the father's mother's brother's and mother's father's lines form the other moiety. Each one of the four patrilineal descent lines accordingly constitutes a patrilineal semi-moiety. The tribes of this area recognize these semi-moieties as absolute social segments, and give to each a distinctive name.

Contemporary research has established that the Marra, their land, and named sites, together with every living species that is selected as important for them, belong to four patrilineal semi-moieties, presented in the following model:

Patrilineal semi-moieties
Mambali	Murrungurn	Guyal	Burdal

== Diet ==
Though mainly a saltwater people, the Marra also availed themselves of all of the abundant resources offered by the inland woodland and freshwater river systems. Fish, crustaceans, mussels (mindiwaba, a saltwater variety) and bird flesh culled by hunting in the wetlands and estuaries, together with green olive ridley and flatback turtles and their eggs, while dugongs, the flesh of file snakes and pythons were also hunted. Inland, emu and five species of kangaroo were ample. As the water retreated with the onset of the dry seasons, the harvesting of the corms and seeds of waterlilies, and digging for bush potatoes, yams, swamp arrowgrass roots and water chestnuts was facilitated. The fruits of the Buchanania obovata were also prized.

== Dreaming ==
In the Marra dreamtime (jijan, or in Kriol drimin), there are several creation narratives, thematically centred on beings such as, in approximate translation, mermaids (Gilyirring/gilyirring), winds/whirlwinds (Walulu), the king brown snake (Bandiyan), the goanna, (Wardabirr), the olive python/quiet snake (Gurrujardbunggu, the black-headed python (Bubunarra), taipan (Garrimarla), the antelopine wallaby (Barlin.gama) and the catfish (Ngurru).

== History of contact ==
Before the coming of white colonists, the Marra may have had some prior contact with Asians. Their word for food/flour/bread, gandirri, has been hypothesised by Nicholas Evans to be a loanword from the Maccassan kanre, meaning food, esp. cooked rice, and if so, would be some evidence that the Marra people had enjoyed direct contact with Macassar traders from southeast Asia.

Matthew Flinders was the first European to set foot on Maria Island in 1802, and noted from fires and footprints that it was inhabited. Ludwig Leichhardt traversed their coastal lands in late 1845, and noted that even in the hardiest conditions of the dry period, it was well-populated. He was the first European to have been sighted by Marra people. The construction of the Overland Telegraph began to make the first major impact on the Marra, as materials were shipped in near Roper Bar, where a large depot was established with upwards of 300 Europeans. One of the people to work with these Europeans was Gajiyuma, who became a maritime pilot for them.

In 1872, with the advent of Wentworth D'Arcy Uhr and Dillon Cox, who encountered roughly 130 Marra dressed in ceremonial costume as they trespassed with their stock into the latter's territory. The Marra were reported as trying to spear horses, and the colonials formed a square and shot away with a Martini–Henry effective up to 1,000 yards, several revolvers, and five Westley Richards shotguns. Numerous Marra were downed, but they persisted fearlessly with their spear-throwing for a half an hour despite the heavy losses. This was the first massacre to take place on Marra lands. Over the following years several white intruders died or were killed, and several reprisals took an unknown toll of more Marra. Paul Foelsche, in response to one such incident, proposed making a punitive expedition against whole tribes in retaliation, specifying in his request that the party in pursuit of a vendetta be given total immunity from prosecution: the proposal was vetoed. Generally, what happened along the stockroute crossing westwards from Queensland and through Marra territory was summed up in one late memoir, in the following terms:

There is no doubt that during the cattle migration and the gold rush to the Kimberleys, the whites shot down the blacks like crows all along the route.'

Virtually the whole of Marra territory was swallowed up in the 12,000-square-kilometer Valley of Springs pastoral lease taken up by John Costello around 1884, who found the "unoccupied land" he took over peopled by numerous Aboriginal people.

Soon after the establishment of the Roper River Mission in 1908, some Marra people together with the remnants of many other uprooted indigenous groups, Alawa, Warndarrang, Ngalakgan and Ngandi, shifted there, but a good number still remained in their home country, and Herbert Basedow described them in 1907 as a large tribe.

== Alternative names ==
- Mara
- Leelalwarra
- Walkonda (?)

== Some words ==
- munanga (white man, European)

== Sources ==
- Basedow, Herbert (1907). "Anthropological notes on the Western Coastal tribes of the Northern Territory of South Australia". Transactions of the Royal Society of South Australia. 31. Adelaide: 1–62.
- Capell, A. (June 1942). "Languages of Arnhem Land, North Australia". Oceania. 12 (4): 364–392. doi:10.1002/j.1834-4461.1942.tb00365.x. JSTOR 40327959.
- Dickson, Greg (2015). Marra and Kriol: the loss and maintenance of knowledge across a language shift boundary (PhD thesis). Australian National University.
- Dickson, Greg (2016). "Rethinking the substrates of Roper River Kriol: The Case of Marra". In Meakins, Felicity; O'Shannessy, Carmel (eds.). Loss and Renewal: Australian Languages Since Colonisation. Walter de Gruyter. pp. 145–175. ISBN 978-1-614-51879-2.
- Heath, Jeffrey (1981). Basic Materials in Mara: Grammar, Texts, and Dictionary. Pacific Linguistics.
- Koch, Harold (2004). "A methological history of Australian language classification". In Bowern, Claire; Koch, Harold James (eds.). Australian Languages: Classification and the Comparative Method. John Benjamins Publishing. pp. 17–59. ISBN 978-9-027-24761-2.
- Linklater, William; Tapp, Lynda (1968). Gather No Moss. Macmillan of Australia.
- Lowrie, James (1886). "Roper River Tribe". In Curr, Edward Micklethwaite (ed.). The Australian race: its origin, languages, customs, place of landing in Australia and the routes by which it spread itself over the continent (PDF). Vol. 1. Melbourne: J. Ferres. pp. 276–278.
- McGregor, William B. (2013). Verb Classification in Australian Languages. Walter de Gruyter. ISBN 978-3-110-87087-9.
- Nordlinger, Rachel (1998). A Grammar of Wambaya, Northern Territory (Australia) (PDF). Pacific Linguistics.
- Pensalfini, Rob (2004). "Eulogizing a language: the Ngarnka experience" (pdf). International Journal of the Sociology of Language (164): 141–156.
- Radcliffe-Brown, A. R. (April 1930a). "The Social Organization of Australian Tribes". Oceania. 1 (1): 34–63. doi:10.1002/j.1834-4461.1930.tb00003.x. JSTOR 40373034.
- Radcliffe-Brown, A. R. (October–December 1930b). "The Social Organization of Australian Tribes Part II (Continued)". Oceania. 1 (3): 322–341. doi:10.1002/j.1834-4461.1930.tb01652.x. JSTOR 40327330.
- Sharp, Lauriston (December 1935). "Semi-Moieties in North-Western Queensland". Oceania. 6 (2): 158–174. doi:10.1002/j.1834-4461.1935.tb00178.x. JSTOR 40327545.
- Spencer, Sir Baldwin; Gillen, Francis J. (1904). Northern Tribes of Central Australia (PDF). Macmillan Publishers.
- Spencer, Baldwin (1914). Native tribes of the Northern Territory of Australia (PDF). London: Macmillan Publishers.
- Tindale, Norman Barnett (1925). "Natives of Groote Eylandt and the west coast of the Gulf of Carpentaria, Parts I-II". Records of the South Australian Museum. 3: 61–102, 103–134.
- Tindale, Norman Barnett (1974). "Mara (NT)". Aboriginal Tribes of Australia: Their Terrain, Environmental Controls, Distribution, Limits, and Proper Names. Australian National University. ISBN 978-0-708-10741-6.
