= Gertie Huddleston =

Aboriginal Australian artist

- Born: c. 1916–1933
- Died: 2013
- Known for: Contemporary Indigenous Australian art
- Spouse: Bill Huddleston
- Relatives: Betty Roberts (sister), Angelina George (sister), Eva Rogers (sister), Dinah Garadji (sister)
- Awards: 1999 National Aboriginal & Torres Strait Islander Art Award

Gertie Huddleston (c. 1916/1933–2013) was a contemporary Indigenous Australian artist who worked in the Ngukurr community.

== Early life and influences ==
Gertie Huddleston's date of birth is uncertain, and estimates range from 1916 to 1933. She was born and raised at the Roper River Mission, now the Ngukurr community, an Anglican mission in Southern Arnhem Land. Her Warndarrang and Mara heritage stems from her father, while her Ngandi and Yugul heritage stems from her mother. Her upbringing at the mission, along with her parents' beliefs, influenced Huddleston's Christian faith, and her work addressed both her faith and her roots in Aboriginal culture. Her time spent at the mission enlarged her knowledge of gardening and caring for the landscape, and she spoke highly of her time spent working on the mission gardens with her family. Mission gardens are a recurring theme in Huddleston's paintings, focusing on the use of the natural landscape, depicting scenes of abundance in the context of human control.

Gertie Huddleston's father was Old Joshua, a Wandarang man and Mara speaker from the area surrounding Boomerang Lagoon (Malanyboyboy), about 50 km north of Ngukurr. Her paternal grandmother was also a Mara speaker, and was from the Limmen Bight area. Her mother, Eizabeth, was Ngandi and Yugal, and her country is the area around Numbulwar. Family contact with the mission began when her grandfather began walking from Boomerang Lagoon to the mission to obtain tobacco and other supplies. Her father met her mother, who was working as a seamstress that sewed clothes for young boys, after he moved to the mission full-time, and they had a Christian marriage. Huddleston has four sisters, Betty Roberts, Angelina George, Eva Rogers, and Dinah Garadji, who are all married and all work as artists. Huddleston and her four sisters are collectively referred to as the Joshua sisters.

Huddleston's father as well as her fiancé, Bill Huddleston, served as soldiers in World War II. Bill and Gertie were married shortly after the end of the war, and moved to the Roper Valley Cattle Station, about 60 km (37 mi) outside of Ngukurr. Huddleston worked as a cook and her husband as a stockman there for almost a decade before moving back to Ngukurr in the late 1960s.

Gertie left Ngukurr to go to Darwin in 1982 while her daughter, Miriam, was hospitalized there for seven weeks. She stayed in Darwin for seven years, during which her husband abandoned her and their children. While she faced difficulty raising them alone, it gave her the opportunity to travel Arnhem land to visit family in other parts of the territory. Gertie returned to Ngukurr in the 1980s and settled, beginning her artistic journey in 1993. Many of her paintings feature elements of the different locations and landscapes she saw while living and traveling throughout Arnhem land. She represents them in different ways, with some paintings being a single landscape, a set of panels of various locations, and sometimes even locations superimposed into a single landscape.

Willie Gudabi and his wife Moima Willie were artistic inspirations and mentors to Huddleston. She claims they did not teach her how to paint, but she would go to their home to avidly watch them paint. Some of their influence can be seen in Huddleston's paintings that include insects and small animals, much like Willie Gudabi's paintings.

== Career ==
Huddleston left Ngukurr in 1982 to move to Darwin for her daughter, who was a patient in a hospital for several weeks, before travelling and exploring Arnhem Land and Central Australia. Images from these travels, including Gunbalanya, the Flinders Range and the deserts appear in a few of her paintings, including the 1996 piece Different Landscapes around Ngukurr. Describing one of the panels in this piece, Huddleston noted that "...me and my sisters and my brothers and my daddy and mummy. We were travelling all over when we were small... St. Vidgeon area. Like that's our country. Big waterhole there. I was thinking about that too you know when I was drawing that. We have the cave, caves where dead people died inside the cave. They bin reckon big snake went there and burnt them... and left only the bones". Thus, Huddleston's work incorporates themes of landscape and country, family history and ancestral past, and memory and imagination. Additionally, she includes Christianity as a recurring motif in her paintings. Sometimes it is through obvious title references, as in the case of her 1999 piece Garden of Eden II. Ahw noted the abundance of trees and bushes in reference to biblical significance of her landscape. The layered bush gardens within her works give expression to syncretic belief systems. In one interview in which she described the Myall lookout, she stated: "there are lots of different trees and bushes around this area. Ghost gums, cycads, palms and many others. Lots of different plants and a lotta bush tucker. Winter-time, after rain. I am a Christian and this painting reminds me of the Garden of Eden - like in the Bible". Although Huddleston's work is not known for overly biblical imagery, biblical undertones can be read into her interpretation of landscape and country. Cath Bowdler, in her catalogue for Colour Country: Art from the Roper River, explains how Christianity informs the artist's work: "Huddleston is a practising Christian, who also maintains traditional beliefs and knowledge systems. Her paintings represent an Aboriginal world-view as well as a Christian one in which she depicts ‘country’ consciously and joyously as paintings reflect a wholly Indigenous experience of ‘country’ despite their Christian allusions and their superficial resemblance to Western landscape paintings. Gertie's story of walking between two worlds is reflected in her paintings". Huddleston, along with her four sisters, began using a new style of acrylic painting on canvas and paper in the late eighties. Her early work was based on the work of Willie Gudabi and Moima Willie, until she was able to develop her style. This own style consisted of a rich palette of colours and intricately detailed flora and fauna of Australia. In addition to this, her paintings contained various types of brush strokes which reflect the embroidery that she learned as a young girl in the Roper River Mission. Huddleston's newfound art techniques were modernist in comparison to other Aboriginal artists. Her use of colours and choice to complement her nature-based paintings with metaphorical storytelling elements, made her paintings extremely pleasing to Western viewers.

In 1987, under the guidance of the Northern Territory Open College of TAFE, the Ngukurr Arts Centre began using acrylic paint on canvas as major medium. According to Janet McKenzie's review of Colour Country: Art from the Roper River, "The introduced materials provided an essential catalyst for an outpouring of imagery, for the development of dynamic and innovative works."

Huddleston began painting with the Ngukurr Arts Centre in 1993, six years after attending art workshops for the first time. Her work explores the intersection of natural and artificial colours and landscapes. She began her artistic career with embroidered work that she learned from the mission and sold through the mission shop in Sydney, which heavily influenced her later painting style. Brenda Croft, senior curator of Aboriginal and Torres Strait Islander art at the National Gallery of Australia, states that Huddleston "embroiders the canvas with paint" through her inclusion of patchwork, tapestry and quilting in her acrylic style. Her use of embroidery imagery and technique "links the celebration of female work with the Women's Movement and the reappraisal of marginalised individuals and cultures against the hegemony of Western art".

Huddleston especially enjoyed painting flowers, an inspiration she felt both through the mission and the bush, and gardens are a recurring theme in her paintings. The mission gardens where she worked in her youth grew many flowers for service or funerary purposes, and the bush where she spent time with her family as a child taught her the meanings and uses of local flora. She painted local wildflowers, bush fruits, cut flowers, flowers form her imagination, and flowers that she had previously embroidered using Semco transfer patterns, such as waratahs and roses. Additionally, her painted flowers also often served as indicators of the season her paintings were set in. Huddleston uses gardens not only to represent her memories of the mission gardens, but sometimes represents some sections of the bush as ordered gardens as well. This mixture of Christianity and Aboriginal spaces are common in Huddleston's paintings, as she views both the gardens and the bush to be God-made and not contradictory of each other.

Although Huddleston never made traditional objects, but they sometimes appear in her paintings. In 1994-1995, she created a number of paintings that focused on decorated objects and tools, absent of her usual landscape elements. These objects include boomerangs, coolamons, and the pandanus baskets and mats that her mother used to make.

Karen Brown became Huddleston's art dealer in 1993 following an invitation from Huddleston to visit Ngukurr to see the artwork by her and her sisters. Brown requested that the Joshua sisters paint for the Karen Brown Gallery in Parap, and she represented the Joshua sisters collectively until 2001. Brown organised a show at the Shades of Ochre Gallery on the Esplanade and followed by three more shows in 1995, 1996, and 1997 at the Rebecca Hossack Gallery in London. In 1997 her work was included in the Ngundungunya: Art For Everyone show at the National Gallery of Victoria, putting her career in the national spotlight. In 2000, she went on to exhibit her work at the Adelaide Biennial of Australian Art: Beyond the Pale at the Art Gallery of South Australia.

Her work Different Landscapes around Ngukurr was selected for the 14th National Aboriginal and Torres Strait Islander Art Award in 1997, and her work Garden of Eden II would win the General Painting Prize at the 1999 National Aboriginal & Torres Strait Islander Art Awards (NATSIAA).

== Collections ==
- Flinders University Art Museum
- National Gallery of Australia
- National Gallery of Victoria
- Museum and Art Gallery of the Northern Territory

== Main exhibitions ==
- 1997: Ngundungunya: Art For Everyone. National Gallery of Victoria, Southbank, Australia.
- 2000: Adelaide Biennale: Beyond the Pale. Art Gallery of South Australia, Adelaide, Australia.
- 2006: Dreaming Their Way: Australian Aboriginal Women Painters. National Museum of Women in the Arts, Washington DC and The Hood Museum of Art at Dartmouth College, Hanover, NH.
- 2009-2010: Colour Country: Art from the Roper River. Wagga Wagga Art Gallery, Wagga Wagga, NSW; Flinders University Art Museum, Adelaide; Drill Hall Gallery, Australian National University, Canberra; Museum and Art Gallery of the Northern Territory, Darwin.
