= Yugul language =

Extinct Australian Aboriginal language

Yugul
- Yukul
- (unattested)
- Native to: Australia
- Region: Northern Territory
- Ethnicity: Yukul
- Extinct: (date missing)
- Language family: Arnhem: Marran; Yugul

Language codes
- ISO 639-3: ygu
- Glottolog: yugu1250
- AIATSIS: N85

Yugul or Yukul is an extinct and unattested Australian Aboriginal language of the Marran family. The name "Yukul" has been used in various ways by people of Ngukurr, where this language may have been spoken, including as a cover term for languages of the area. A summary of the available information on Yukul is presented in Baker (2010). However, on the basis of place names, Harvey (2008) notes that Yugul appears to be closely related to Marra.

== Names ==
The Yugul and Warndarrang, and possibly other groups, were generally designated (ṛa)-ṇuŋguḷaŋur according to Isaac Joshua, the last fluent speaker of Warndarrang. It was translated as 'fish hunters' by Aboriginal speakers of English, but etymologically translates to 'corroboree people', derived from gentilic ṇuN- (where ⟨N⟩ represents an unspecified nasal consonant) and wu-ḷaŋur 'corroboree'. The name "Yugul" has been used both to refer specifically to the Yukul people, as well as collectively, referencing more than one language group.

== Geographical distribution ==
The Yugul were divided into two groups. The Yugul proper lived around Ngukurr, while the Yugulmanggi lived to the south. It is also associated with the Roper River. Norman Tindale located the "Jukul" near Roper Bar, as well as on the south bank of the Roper River at the mouth of the Hodgson River.

== History ==
Yugul was described as a lingua franca by consultants in the region. In historical records, the name "Yugul" is often not mentioned. The first mention of it may be Robert Hamilton Mathews referencing the "Yookull" as one of the tribes inhabiting the country including Elsey Creek and the Katherine and Roper Rivers, mentioning that they were organized into eight sections. Donald Thomson does not mention the Yugul explicitly, but one of his photographs has a caption that reads '"Old Yellow Finger", Mau’wu’riringa – Yukul'.

== Vocabulary ==
No vocabulary explicitly bearing the name of Yugul has ever been recorded. However, two vocabularies were collected from the area associated with Yugul at the time of earliest contact with non-Indigenous people. During the construction of the Australian Overland Telegraph Line, William A. Crowder recorded ten words from a "Roper native language" around 1871 to 1872, presumably at Narakgarani, a location "just east" of Roper Bar. It is most likely that this vocabulary is of Yugul, as it is improbable that Crowder met Marra people at that time, and the words do not resemble Ngalakgan, the language now associated with Roper Bar.

gloss	"Roper native language"	Marra	Other languages
food	Tercunderie	gandirri 'flour, food' (?)	Alawa
shells	Co'biarr		Wandarang: gamba (?)
fish hook	Cara'boo	garrubi	
reed ring for arm	Ilgarra	rilgarra 'vine fron which reed rings are made'	Warndarang, Ngalakgan
hair	Been-der	binja	Alawa: mbinjur
knife	Bee-car		Alawa: bijabija 'yamstick, digging stick'
teeth	Marl-dull	ngarndal 'mouth' (?)	Alawa
hand	Moor-etch	murrji	Warndarang
foot	Darra-loo	jarrbu (?)	
nose	In-Jerra	n-jiri	
