= Yukul =

Yukul or Jukul may refer to:

- Yukul people, an ethnic group of Australia
- Yukul language, an extinct Australian language

== See also ==
- Yucul
- Yugul (disambiguation)
- Yukulta
