= Yugul =

Yugul may refer to the following topics associated with Northern Territory, Australia:

- Yugul people, an ethnic group
- Yugul language, an extinct language
- Yugul (band), a contemporary blues band

== See also ==
- Jugul
