= Warndarang =

Warndarang is an alternative spelling of Warndarrang. It may refer to:

- Warndarrang people
- Warndarrang language
