= Ngukurr Airport =

Airport in Northern Territory, Australia

- IATA: RPM; ICAO: YNGU

Summary
- Airport type: Public
- Operator: Yugul Mangi Community Government Council
- Location: Roper River, Northern Territory, Australia
- Elevation AMSL: 45 ft / 14 m
- Coordinates: 14°43′22″S 134°44′51″E

Map
- Location in the Northern Territory

Runways
Direction	Length		Surface
Direction	m	ft	Surface
11/29	1,530	5,020	Asphalt
- Sources: Australian AIP and aerodrome chart

Ngukurr Airport (IATA: RPM, ICAO: YNGU) is located in Roper River, Northern Territory, Australia, adjacent to the remote Aboriginal community of Ngukurr.

== Airlines and destinations ==
Airlines	Destinations
Mission Aviation Fellowship	Darwin, Gove

== See also ==
- List of airports in the Northern Territory
