= Margaret Sharpe =

Linguist in Australia

- Partner: Isidore Dyen

Academic background
- Education: University of Queensland (PhD)

Academic work
- Discipline: Linguist
- Sub-discipline: Australian Aboriginal languages

Margaret Clare Sharpe is a linguist of Australian Aboriginal languages, specialising in Yugambeh-Bundjalung languages, with particular regard to Yugambir, She has also done significant salvage fieldwork on the Alawa language from the Northern Territory.

== Career ==
Sharpe completed her doctoral dissertation on the language of the Alawa people at the University of Queensland in 1965. After a further stint of fieldwork between June 1966 and May 1968, this was updated and issued as a monograph under the imprint of the Australian Institute of Aboriginal Studies in 1972. In the meantime she worked with one of the last speakers of Yugambir, Joe Culham, then in his eighties, and wrote up the results in a 53-page analysis published shortly after his death in 1968.

As part of her work on Alawa, she translated both Alawa language stories and kriol versions of the same given by her informant Barnabas Roberts concerning violent encounters between white settlers and the Alawa. According to one reviewer, their juxtaposition underlined that Aboriginal story-telling in their English dialects can be at times as, if not more, revealing as what is recorded of an event in their mother tongue. (Note: Perhaps the best illustration of the value of Aboriginal English is Barnabas Roberts' story, given to Margaret Sharpe in 1967...Roberts' Roper Creole/English testimony of violent contact between Aborigines and whites, and Sharpe's Alawa translation of a related incident are placed back-to-back. Even the translator admits that the Aboriginal English is "fuller than the Alawa version (in translation) in some respects" Hercus and Sutton p.63. It certainly is." (Headon 1988, p. 37))

Sharpe went on to work as a lecturer at the Department of Aboriginal and Multicultural Studies of the University of New England, on the Yugambeh-Baandjalung dialect chain. She has also been active in teaching Indigenous groups about the 'disappearing languages' their forefathers spoke.

Sharpe has also written three novels, one of which, A Family Divided, deals with interracial conflict and friendship.

Sharpe speaks a dialect of Bundjalung, she describes her skills as "not terribly fluently" and, despite this, has recorded talk in conversations with the Yugambeh language instructor Shaun Davies. She remains an adjunct lecturer, and is now returning to her original interest in science by completing a PhD in astrophysics.

== Honours ==
In 2017, Sharpe was designated a Kaialgumm, "champion in the fight", by the Yugambeh Museum in recognition of her decades-long scholarship and teaching in documenting, and helping to revive, the Yugambeh language.

== Sources ==
- Cunningham, M. (1969). A Description of the Yugumbir Dialect of Bandjalang (PDF). Vol. 1. University of Queensland Papers. pp. 69–122.
- Headon, David (1988). ""The Coming of the Dingoes": Black/White Interaction in the Literature of the Northern Territory". In Nelson, Emmanuel Sampath (ed.). Connections: Essays on Black Literatures. Aboriginal Studies Press. pp. 25–40. ISBN 978-0-855-75186-9.
- Marciniak, Catherine; Sharpe, Margaret (22 August 2017). "Margaret Sharpe: Linguist of Australian Aboriginal Languages". ABC North Coast.
- Sharpe, M. (1986). "Moving into the Mission; Stealing on the Station". In Hercus, Luise; Sutton, Peter (eds.). This is what Happened: Historical Narratives by Aborigines. Australian Institute of Aboriginal Studies. ISBN 978-0-855-75144-9.
- Sharpe, M. (1993). "Teaching a Disappearing Language". In Walsh, Michael; Yallop, Colin (eds.). Language and Culture in Aboriginal Australia. Aboriginal Studies Press. pp. 73–84. ISBN 978-0-855-75241-5.
- Sharpe, Margaret C. "Margaret Sharpe blog".
- Sharpe, Margaret C. (1965). Alawa Phonology and Grammar (PDF). University of Queensland.
- Sharpe, Margaret C. (1972). Alawa Phonology and Grammar. Canberra: Australian Institute for Aboriginal Studies. ISBN 978-0-85575-012-1 – via Internet Archive.
- Sharpe, Margaret C. (1985). "Bundjalung settlement and migration" (PDF). Aboriginal History. 9 (1): 101–124.
- Sharpe, Margaret C. (1998). Dictionary of Yugambeh including neighbouring dialects (PDF). Pacific Linguistics. ISBN 0-85883-480-4.
- Sharpe, Margaret C. (1999). Alawa Wanggaya: Alawa-Kriol-English Dictionary. Katherine, NT: Diwurruwurru-Jaru.
- Sharpe, Margaret C. (2005). An Introduction to the Yugambeh-Bundjalung Language and its Dialects (4th ed.). Armidale, NSW: University of New England.
- Sharpe, Margaret C. (2007). "A revised view of the verbal suffixes of Yugambeh-Bundjalung". In Siegel, Jeff; Lynch, John Dominic; Eades, Diana (eds.). Language Description, History and Development: Linguistic Indulgence in Memory of Terry Crowley. John Benjamins Publishing. pp. 53–68. ISBN 978-9-027-25252-4.
- Sharpe, Margaret C. (2008). "Alawa and its Neighbours: Enigma Variations 1 and 2". In Bowern, Claire; Evans, Bethwyn; Miceli, Luisa (eds.). Morphology and Language History: In honour of Harold Koch. John Benjamins Publishing. pp. 59–70. ISBN 978-9-027-29096-0.
- Sharpe, Margaret C.; Tunbridge, Dorothy (2003) [First published 1997]. "Traditions of extinct animals, changing sea-levels and volcanoes among Australian Aboriginals: evidence from linguistic and ethnographic research". In Blench, Roger; Spriggs, Matthew (eds.). Archaeology and Language I: Theoretical and Methodological Orientations. Routledge. pp. 345–361. ISBN 978-1-134-82877-7.
- "UNE lecturer declared a 'champion' of Aboriginal language". Armidale: University of New England. 24 July 2017.
