= Lonely Boys =

Music band from Ngukurr in Arnhem Land, Northern Territory, Australia

Lonely Boys is a band from Ngukurr, Northern Territory, a remote aboriginal community, Ngukurr on the Roper River in Arnhem Land. A six-piece guitar inspired rock band, they play a mix of punk, rock and metal.

In 2006, they won the Barunga Festival battle of the bands, and in the same year also appeared at the Groovin' the Moo festival in Darwin.

In 2015, they headlined at the Barunga Festival.

The group won the 2016 NT Rock Song of the Year for 'Murray Island' from their EP The Hunter.

In 2017, Lonely Boys were the headline act alongside the Irrunytju Band for the Sand Tracks First Nations contemporary music tour, participated in the Barunga Festival and were the opening act for Queens Of The Stone Age, in Darwin.

Their lead guitarist died in a car crash on October 21, 2018.

Their lead singer died after being struck by a car near his hometown on December 12, 2020.

== Members ==
- Ambrose Daniels
- Winston Joshua (Foster)
- Thomas Wurramara
- Burt Rami
- Kasley Daniels
- Leon Daniels
- Dylan Daniels
- Benjamin Wilfred
- Anton Rami
- Ben Mangi

== Discography ==
- Lonely Child (2007)
- The Hunter EP (2017) - Skinnyfish
