= WND =

WND or wnd may refer to:

- WorldNetDaily, an American far-right news and opinion website
- WND, the Amtrak station code for Windsor station, Connecticut, United States
- WND, the National Rail station code for Wendover railway station, Buckinghamshire, England
- wnd, the ISO 639-3 language code for Warndarrang language, Australia
