= Gajiyuma =

Australian Aboriginal leader (died 1909)

Gajiyuma, also known as Old Bob or King Bob (? – February 1909), was a member of the Marra people from the Roper River region in the Northern Territory of Australia.

He became a prominent Aboriginal man in the region and was one of the first to interact with the staff of the Overland Telegraph Line as they travelled through his Country, and later encouraged people to move to the newly established Roper River Mission for safety.

== Life in the Northern Territory ==
Little is known of Gajiyuma's life before he met with and began to interact with the staff constructing the Overland Telegraph Line at the depot they had constructed on the Roper River in 1871. He soon began advising the construction crews about the conditions of the area, which he knew well, especially in relation to his knowledge of the river; he soon became a maritime pilot for them. In this role, he would join vessels, such as the Omeo and the Young Australian, at the mouth of the river and guide their passage. It was during this period that he was first given the nickname 'Bob'.

In 1873, when the Roper River section of the telegraph was completed, the crews moved on, and the need for Gajiyuma declined. Despite this, he remained camped, alongside his family, at the mouth of the river, awaiting ships to pilot. These ships were primarily bringing supplies for the stores, police stations, and pastoral stations in the region; they would also, less frequently, ship ore from mines in Pine Creek.

By the early 1900s, Gajiyuma had come to be known as 'Old Bob', and his son, 'Bob', undertook most of the piloting work.

In 1906, Gajiyuma sought out Alfred Giles, who was traveling through the area, to emphatically state his ownership of land in the Roper River.

When the Church Missionary Society opened its first mission on the Roper River in 1908, it had Gajiyuma's strong support. In 1906, Gajiyuma assisted Gilbert White in selecting the location of the Church of England mission at Ngukurr, which was known as the Roper River Mission. Gajiyuma then greeted the missionaries when they arrived in 1908 and began to be called 'King Bob' by them. After the mission was established, Gajiyuma travelled widely to tell his people that the mission was a safe space and could protect them from the massacres happening in the region. He was able to bring more than 200 people to the mission, which far exceeded the expectations of those who had established it.

Of this Bogdan Zieba stated:

Gajiyuma chose the mission as the place of the salvation for the dispersed Aboriginal tribes who survived the persecution. During the last months of his life, he worked spreading the message in the region: “They aren’t going to shoot everyone! They are just schoolteachers!” Gajiyuma brought to the mission over 200 survivors from Alawa, Mara, Ngalakan, Ngandi, Nunggubuyu, Rembarrnga, Warndarang and Mangarayi tribes. Without his vision, faith and determination the Roper River Mission would probably have never come into existence.

— Bogdan Zieba, A theological and philosophical interpretation of the history of events and developments leading to the establishment of Nungalinya College (2022)

Gajiyuma died in February 1909 at the mission.
