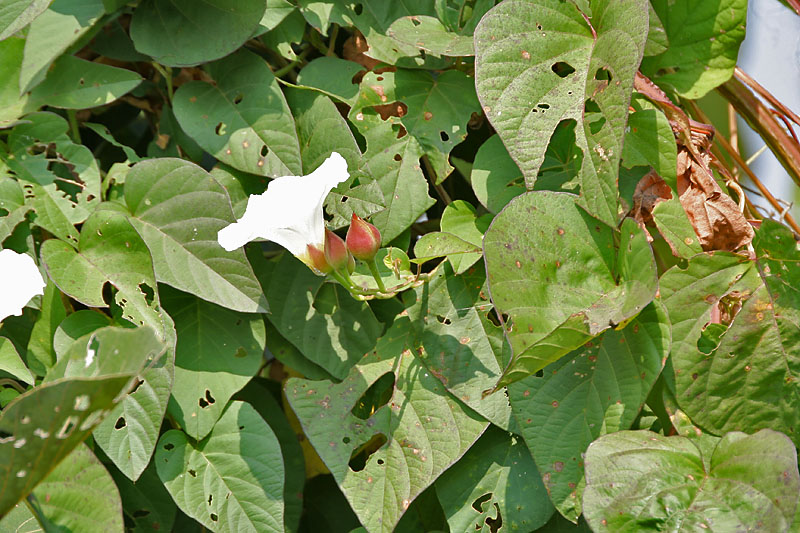
- in Kawal Wildlife Sanctuary, India.

Scientific classification
- Kingdom: Plantae
- Clade: Tracheophytes
- Clade: Angiosperms
- Clade: Eudicots
- Clade: Asterids
- Order: Solanales
- Family: Convolvulaceae
- Genus: Operculina
- Species: O. turpethum

Binomial name
- Operculina turpethum (L.) Silva Manso

Synonyms
- Merremia turpethum (L.) Shah & Bhatt.

= Operculina turpethum =

Species of flowering plant

Operculina turpethum (syn. Ipomoea turpethum) is a species of plant in the morning glory family, known commonly as turpeth, fue vao, and St. Thomas lidpod.

It is large, robust, perennial, herbaceous, and hairy vine growing 4 to 5 meters in length. It is found in India, in the North Circars and Deccan region up to 3000 ft, East Africa, Papua New Guinea and Australia in both Queensland and the Northern Territory of Australia, near Shoal Bay and Maria Island.

The leaves are alternate, very variable in shape, ovate, oblong and truncate or cordate at the base approximately 5.5–15 cm long. Its flowers are white, large, axillary, and solitary. The fruit is a capsule up to 1.5 cm in diametre, with conspicuous enlarged sepals and thickened pedicles.
