= Alawa people =

Alawa
Total population
- possibly several hundred (Less than 1% of the Australian population)

Regions with significant populations
- Australia (Northern Territory)

Languages
- Alawa language, English, Australian Kriol language

Religion
- Aboriginal mythology

Related ethnic groups
- Ngandji people

The Alawa people are an Indigenous Australian people from Arnhem Land in the Northern Territory of Australia. The suburb of Alawa in the Darwin's north, is named in their honour.

== Language ==
The Alawa language is a non-Pama-Nyungan language, classified by Jeffrey Heath as one of three of a subgroup, together with Marra and Warndarang, though this is now contested. It had only 18 speakers in a report dated 1991 (Ethnologue). That number was reduced to 12 by 2013. The speakers of Alawa are mainly adults, and most of the Alawa speak Kriol, though there are Alawa language revival efforts at the Minyerri School in the Alawa community.

== Country ==
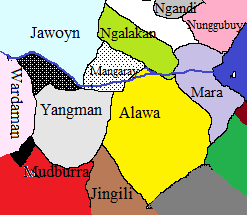
Traditional lands of the Aboriginal tribes in the Roper River area of the Northern Territory

Traditional Alawa territory covered some 1,600 square miles (4,100 km^{2}) and extended from the southern tributaries of the Roper River upstream from the mouth of the Hodgson River west to Roper valley; south to Mason Bluff (Mount Mueller) and Hodgson Downs; east to the headwaters of Mountain Creek. Many Alawa people now live in Minyerri.

== Lifestyle ==
The traditional lifestyle of the Alawa consisted of harvesting and hunting the abundant food resources provided by their land, which was rich in species of turtle, duck, crocodiles and fish. They had a technique of conserving foods for considerable periods. Norman Tindale was shown in 1922 a refuge cave they maintained at Mountain Creek well stocked with buried stores of water lily seeds, and roots, which were first sun-dried, then rubbed with red ochre before being wrapped and packed in paperbark sheets. After the loss of their lands they specialized in working as jackaroos on pastoral stations.

== History ==
The Alawa tribe, like many others in the Roper River region, were hunted down in an extermination policy developed by the pastoral company that took over the Hodgson Downs in 1903, and remnants took refuge from the killing teams by seeking the protection of pastoralists who would employ them, or on church missions.

== Native title ==
Together with the Ngandji people, the descendants of the Alawa have laid a native title claim to the Cox River block.

== Sources ==
- Clarke, Philip A. (2011). Aboriginal People and Their Plants. Rosenberg Publishing. ISBN 978-1-921719-73-8.
- Edmonds, Angelique (2007). "Sedentary topography: the impact of Christian Mission Society's 'civilising' agenda on the spatial structure of life in the Roper Region of northern Australia". In Macfarlane, Ingereth; Hannah, Mark (eds.). Transgressions: Critical Australian Indigenous Histories. Australian National University. pp. 193–209. ISBN 978-1-921313-43-1.
- Sharpe, Margaret (2008). "Alawa and its Neighbours: Enigma Variations 1 and 2". In Bowern, Claire; Evans, Bethwyn; Miceli, Luisa (eds.). Morphology and Language History: In Honour of Harold Koch. John Benjamins Publishing. pp. 59–70. ISBN 978-90-272-4814-5.
- Tindale, Norman Barnett (1974). "Alawa (NT)". Aboriginal Tribes of Australia: Their Terrain, Environmental Controls, Distribution, Limits, and Proper Names. Australian National University Press. ISBN 978-0-7081-0741-6. Archived from the original on 20 March 2020.
