= Maria Island, Gulf of Carpentaria =

Island in Northern Territory, Australia

Coordinates: 14.874°S 135.739°E

Maria Island (Marra: Gurrululinya) is an island in the Gulf of Carpentaria, in the Northern Territory. It is sacred to local indigenous Australian people, an important ecological niche for various species of wildlife, and the object of interest to mining companies. The first Europeans to sight the island were the Dutch, who mapped it as a cape, and its status as an island was only thereafter determined when Matthew Flinders sailed around it in late December 1802.

== Description ==
Maria Island lies 20 miles offshore of the southwestern coast of the Gulf of Carpentaria, in Limmen Bight. It, and the wetlands, and seas in its vicinity, rich in seagrasses are an important nesting and feeding site for three species of turtle, and contains substantial colonies of silver gulls. The interior is stocked with large numbers of the northern brown bandicoot while herds of dugong and dolphin pods frequent its waters. It is also an important feeding and breeding area also for critically endangered curlew sandpipers, great knot, and freshwater sawfish. Three species of turtle, among them the olive ridley and flatback turtle, exploit the sand dunes on the edges of the island to lay their eggs.

== Aboriginal traditions ==
16 sacred sites on the island Maria Island have been registered with the Northern Territory Aboriginal Areas Protection Authority. According to one tradition, it is the resting-place of their Kangaroo Dreaming which lay down there after travelling through the desert. It is also regarded as the site of a poisonous she-oak that may kill certain intruders.

== Mining ==
In 2011, the Western Desert Resources Corporation, together with its partner Sherwin Iron, announced plans that it was planning to run a pipeline from its Roper Bar mining site to carry slurry to the island for treatment there before being offloaded into barges that would ferry the material to ships in deeper water for export to East Asian steel mills. The following year, in 2012 Maria Island was included in the Limmen National Park established that year, though the agreement excised considerable portions of land for mining exploration.

In 2014, the two companies collapsed in the wake of a slump in the iron ore market. Sometime afterwards the Dubai company Al-Rawda Resources expressed interest in resurrecting the earlier project, by planning to establish a coastal facility on the area's wetlands where barges could load ore for shipment to container vessels 6 lying 6 kilometers north of Maria Island. The Marra community expressed concerns that the infrastructure, if established, would contaminate what is a pristine reserve.

== Sources ==
- Dickson, Greg (2015). Marra and Kriol: the loss and maintenance of knowledge across a language shift boundary (PhD thesis). Australian National University.
- Murdoch, Lindsay (27 June 2011). "If miners talked to us, they'd know about sacred island's poison tree, say elders". Sydney Morning Herald.
- Hancock, David (21 March 2012). "Huge national park declared in Northern Territory". Australian Geographic.
- Bardon, Jane (11 August 2017). "Indigenous leaders ask NT Government to reject iron mine revival". ABC News.
- "Save Maria Island". Environment Centre, NT. 2012.
