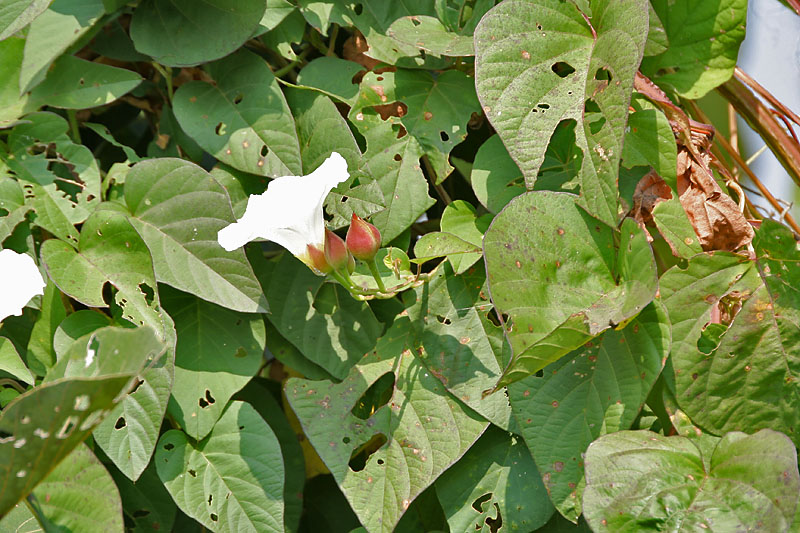
- Operculina turpethum

Scientific classification
- Kingdom: Plantae
- Clade: Tracheophytes
- Clade: Angiosperms
- Clade: Eudicots
- Clade: Asterids
- Order: Solanales
- Family: Convolvulaceae
- Genus: Operculina (L.) Silva Manso

Type species
- Operculina turpethum Silva Manso

= Operculina =

Genus of flowering plants

Operculina is a genus of plants in the morning-glory family which that are found throughout the world.

== Species ==
The following species are recognised in the genus Operculina:

- Operculina aequisepala (Domin) R. W. Johnson
- Operculina brownii Ooststr.
- Operculina codonantha (Benth.) Hallier f.
- Operculina hamiltonii (G. Don) D. F. Austin & Staples
- Operculina leptoptera Urb.
- Operculina macrocarpa (L.) Urb.
- Operculina maypurensis (Hallier f.) A.R.Simões & Staples
- Operculina petaloidea (Choisy) Ooststr.
- Operculina pinnatifida (Kunth) O'Donell
- Operculina polynesica Staples
- Operculina pteripes (G. Don) O'Donell
- Operculina riedeliana (Oliv.) Ooststr.
- Operculina sericantha (Miq.) Ooststr.
- Operculina tansaensis Santapau & Patel
- Operculina turpethum Silva Manso (Indian Jalap)
- Operculina ventricosa (Bertero) Peter
