= Hodgson River =

River in the Northern Territory of Australia

Coordinates: 14°47′16″S 134°35′14″E

The Hodgson River is a tributary of the Roper River between Roper Bar and Ngukurr, Northern Territory, Australia.

The river is in the Limmen National Park and the traditional owners of the river are the Yukul people.

The river flowed through the now defunct Hundred of Fasque.
