= Ngalakgan =

The Ngalakgan are an indigenous Australian people of the Northern Territory.

== Language ==
Ngalakgan is generally classified as a member of the Gunwinyguan family.

== Country ==
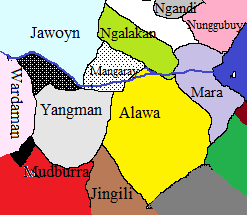
Traditional lands of the Aboriginal tribes in the Roper River area of the Northern Territory

Ngalakgan territory covered an estimated 3,000 square miles (7,800 km^{2}), north of the Roper River as far as Mainoru, and ran from east of the Wilton River to the upper Maiwok and Flying Fox creeks. The Jawoyn lay directly west, the Dalabon to the northwest, the Rembarrnga to their immediate north, the Ngandi and Yukul to their east, while the Alawa lay on their southern flank.

== Ethnography ==
Norman Tindale was the earliest ethnographer to work directly with, and study, the Ngalakgan, in 1922 during his first fieldwork trip.

== Alternative names ==
- Ngalagan, Ngalakan. Ngalarkan
- Nalakan, Nalagen
- Nala-nalagen
- Nullakun, Nullikan, Nullikin
- Ngulkpun

== Sources ==
- Baker, Brett (2008). Word Structure in Ngalakgan. CSLI Publications. ISBN 978-1-575-86562-1.
- Ponsonnet, Maïa (2014). The Language of Emotions: The case of Dalabon (Australia). John Benjamins Publishing Company. ISBN 978-9-027-26920-1.
- Tindale, Norman (1925). "Natives of Groote Eylandt and the west coast of the Gulf of Carpentaria, Part I". Records of the South Australian Museum. 3: 61–102.
- Tindale, Norman Barnett (1974). "Ngalakan (NT)". Aboriginal Tribes of Australia: Their Terrain, Environmental Controls, Distribution, Limits, and Proper Names. Australian National University. ISBN 978-0-708-10741-6. Archived from the original on 21 March 2018.
