= Warndarrang =

Aboriginal Australian people of the Northern Territory

The Warndarrang people, (waɳʈaraŋ), also spelt Warndarang, Wanderang, and other variants were a predominantly coastal Aboriginal Australian people of eastern Northern Territory. Though extinct as a distinct ethnolinguistic group, their descendants survive among the neighbouring Nunggubuyu.

== Language ==
Warndarang has been classified as a member of the Gunwinyguan language group. Though thought to be extinct by 1974, some sources state that a fluent speaker was interviewed in 1989 and provided significant amounts of oral text in the language, together with a translation into Kriol.

== Country ==
The traditional lands of the Warndarang extended over an area in Arnhem Land of some 1,100 square miles (2,800 km^{2}) from the Gulf of Carpentaria and the Phelp River inland to Mount Leane. To their north were the Nunggubuyu while their western borders reached inland, eastwards to the Ngandi territories between the Walker and Rose rivers.

== History ==
In 1903 the Eastern and African Cold Storage Supply Company purchased the Hodgson Downs cattle station and other tribal lands, and embarked on a policy of systematic extermination of all Aboriginal people residing on the land which the company directors wished to turn into a pastoral empire. Hunting gangs consisting of 10-14 Aboriginal (though not local) men, armed and under the supervision of a white or "half-caste" foreman, were commissioned to clear the land by shooting any Aboriginal person on sight. When the Church of England established the Roper River Mission in 1908, the remnants of the Warndarang, together with survivors of other local clans of peoples such as the Alawa, Marra, Ngalakgan, Ngandi, and the southern clans of the Rembarrnga and Nunggubuyu gathered there for sanctuary from the onslaught. Eventually several clans of the Warndarung were assimilated by the Nunggubuyu by adopting their language.

== Sources ==
- Capell, Arthur (March 1960). "The Wandarang and Other Tribal Myths of the Yabuduruwa Ritual". Oceania. 30 (3): 206–224. doi:10.1002/j.1834-4461.1960.tb00221.x. JSTOR 40329205.
- Edmonds, Angelique (2007). "Sedentary topography: the impact of Christian Mission Society's 'civilising' agenda on the spatial structure of life in the Roper Region of northern Australia". In Macfarlane, Ingereth; Hannah, Mark (eds.). Transgressions: Critical Australian Indigenous Histories. Australian National University. pp. 193–209. ISBN 978-1-921-31343-1.
- Evans, Nicholas (1992). "Macassan loanwords in topend languages". Australian Journal of Linguistics. 12 (1): 45–91. doi:10.1080/07268609208599471.
- Heath, Jeffrey (1978a). Linguistic diffusion in Arnhem Land. Australian Institute of Aboriginal Studies.
- Heath, Jeffrey (1978b). Ngandi grammar, texts, and dictionary (PDF). Australian Institute of Aboriginal Studies. ISBN 0-85575-081-2.
- Heath, Jeffrey (1980). Nunggubuyu myths and ethnographic texts (PDF). Australian Institute of Aboriginal Studies. ISBN 978-0-855-75120-3.
- Rieländer, Klaus (1997). "The Right to Have TV". In Riemenschneider, Dieter; Davis, Geoffrey V. (eds.). Aratjara: Aboriginal Culture and Literature in Australia. Rodopi. pp. 211–222. ISBN 978-9-042-00132-9.
- Tindale, Norman Barnett (1974). "Wandarang (NT)". Aboriginal Tribes of Australia: Their Terrain, Environmental Controls, Distribution, Limits, and Proper Names. Australian National University Press. ISBN 978-0-708-10741-6.
