= Roper Bar =

Roper Bar Yurlhbunji (Ngalakgan)
- Town
- Coordinates: 14°44′06″S 134°31′44″E
- Country: Australia
- State: Northern Territory
- Location: 312 km (194 mi) from Katherine; 606 km (377 mi) from Darwin; 1,235 km (767 mi) from Alice Springs

Government
  - Federal division: Lingiari
- Time zone: UTC+9:30 (ACST)

Roper Bar (Ngalakgan: Yurlhbunji) is a location in Australia's Northern Territory. It lies on the traditional land of the Ngalakgan people. This part of Australia is extremely remote for travellers, although there are a number of Aboriginal communities in the region including Ngukurr, Urapunga and Minyerri. A four-wheel drive trek through these parts can be an extension of the Gulf Track on a journey further up north to Darwin or Arnhem Land.

== Location ==
Roper Bar is a settlement on the Roper River, 606 km southeast of Darwin, 312 km east of Katherine and 1,235 km from Alice Springs. The first European to explore the Roper River was Ludwig Leichhardt in 1845 as he made his way from Moreton Bay to Port Essington. Leichhardt crossed the river at Roper Bar, a rocky shelf that lies at the high tide limit on the river. He named the river after John Roper, a member of the expedition.

The town is a small settlement with a police station, a motel, the Roper Bar store, a caravan park and roadhouse facilities. Fishing in the Roper River, particularly for the prized barramundi, has attracted fishermen to the area. The Roper Highway is a flat and monotonous, partially unsealed road that connects Roper Bar to the Stuart Highway. At the road's end is a tropical river which, like all of the rivers around the Gulf of Carpentaria, is unsuitable for swimming as it is the habitat of the saltwater crocodile.

== History ==
The traditional owners of the area were the Ngalakgan Aboriginal people, one of the Gunwinyguan people who traditionally spoke the Ngalakgan language, although today many speak the Arnhem Kriol.

The first European to the hundred was Ludwig Leichhardt who crossed the Roper River at the Roper Bar in 1845, and in 1855 Augustus Charles Gregory passed to the south of the hundred on his route to Gladstone, Queensland.

In the 1870s pastoral leases were being taken up, gold had been discovered at Pine Creek to the north and in 1872 a store depot for the Australian Overland Telegraph Line was established at Roper Bar, it being the furthest point up river that was navigable to ships. The hundred was anticipated to be the seat of a prosperous port.

In the 1890s the area was a favourite stop over for drovers bringing cattle between Queensland and the Kimberley region, and it had a very wild reputation.

In 1902 Jeannie Gunn moved to nearby Elsey Station and wrote of her experience in the area, in the novel We of the Never Never.
