= Yugul (band) =

- Origin: Ngukurr, Australia
- Genres: Blues
- Years active: 1969–1975, 2001-
- Labels: Skinnyfish Music

Yugul are a blues band from Ngukurr, a small community in southeast Arnhem Land. They are the first Aboriginal blues band in the Northern Territory and one of the longest running, having been established around 1968. They released their debut album in 2003 with help from Charles Darwin University, Blues Across the River, which is credited as being one of Australia's great blues albums.

== Discography ==
=== Albums ===
List of albums, with selected details
| Title | Details |
|---|---|
| Blues Across the River | Released: 2003; Format: CD; Label: Skinnyfish Music (SFYU040101) |
