= Warndarrang language =

Extinct Australian Aboriginal language

Warndarang
- Waɳʈaraŋ
- Pronunciation: [waɳʈaraŋ]
- Native to: Australia
- Region: Arnhem Land, Northern Territory
- Ethnicity: Warndarang people
- Extinct: 1974, with the death of Isaac Joshua
- Language family: Arnhem?: Marran; Warndarang

Language codes
- ISO 639-3: wnd
- Glottolog: wand1263
- AIATSIS: N120
- ELP: Warndarrang

Warndarrang (waɳʈaraŋ), also spelt Warndarang, Wanderang, Wandaran, and other variants is an extinct Aboriginal Australian language in the Arnhem family, formerly spoken by the Warndarrang people in southern Arnhem Land, along the Gulf of Carpentaria. The last speaker was Isaac Joshua, who died in 1974, while working with the linguist Jeffrey Heath.

Warndarrang is characterised by an unusually simplified nominal case system but highly intricate pronominal and demonstrative systems. It is a primarily prefixing language with agglutinating verbal complexes and relatively straightforward syntax.

Warndarrang is closely related to Mara, which was traditionally spoken to the south of Warndarang and today has a handful of speakers. The languages Alawa and Yugul, spoken to the west of Warndarrang and both apparently extinct, are also related.

Heath's Warndarang grammar contains a 100-page grammatical description, a handful of texts, and a brief wordlist. A Warndarang story of the Hodgson Downs massacre is published separately, and both Margaret Sharpe and Arthur Capell collected material in the 1960s and 1940s, respectively, much of which is unpublished but was incorporated into Heath's grammar.

== Language and speakers ==
Warndarang is a member of the Gunwinyguan family, the second-largest Australian language family after Pama–Nyungan. Warndarang is an extinct language – the last speaker died in 1974 – but was traditionally spoken along the Gulf of Carpentaria, in Arnhem Land (Northern Territory, Australia) near the mouths of the Roper, Phelp, and Rose Rivers. The term ɳuŋguɭaŋur, meaning 'corroboree people', was used by Warndarang speakers to refer to the people in the Roper River area, though waɳʈaraŋ was used to refer to speakers of Warndarang specifically.

Within the Gunwinyguan languages, Warndarang is most closely related to Mara, a language today spoken by only a handful of people. Warndarang and Mara, together with Alawa and Yugul, form what used to be known as the "Mara-Alawic family" and today is considered a subgrouping of the Gunwinyguan family. Mara was traditionally spoken to the south of Warndarang, along the coast and the Limmen Bight River, while Yugul and Alawa were spoken inland, to the west of Warndarang. Yugul and Alawa both appear to be extinct. Warndarang territory was bordered on the north by the languages Ngandi and Nunggubuyu, with which Warndarang had significant contact. Ngandi is extinct, though many Nunggubuyu children are semi-speakers.

The Warndarang people classified themselves into four patrilineal semimoieties used in ritual settings: mambali, muruŋun, wuʈal, and guyal (wuyal). Mambali and muruŋun were considered to be associated, as were wuʈal and guyal, enough so that a person of one semimoiety learned and was permitted to sing the traditional songs of the associated semimoiety. Each semimoiety was associated with a particular watering hole and animal totems (for example, muruŋun had the totem ŋarugalin, 'dugong [Dugong dugon]'), though anybody could drink from the watering holes and a person was permitted to consume his or her totem. This structure is very similar to those of the Mara and Nunggubuyu people.

The majority of Warndarang material was collected by the linguist Jeffrey Heath in 1973 (two days) and 1974 (fifteen days) from a single informant, Isaac Joshua. Isaac was born in approximately 1904 in the Phelp River region, moving as a young man to work as a stockman with the Mara people. As such, he had spoken very little Warndarang in decades preceding Heath's arrival, speaking instead in Mara, English, Kriol, or Nunggubuyu, but proved to be a good informant, especially knowledgeable on flora-fauna and religiously significant terms. Brief work on Warndarang by Margaret Sharpe in the 1960s also used Isaac Joshua as the sole informant, though Arthur Capell's work in the 1940s used Isaac's brother, Joshua Joshua. An elderly woman by the name of Elizabeth Joshua remembered a small amount of Warndarang, and Heath checked a few points with her after Isaac's death.

== Grammar ==
(All grammatical information from Heath (1980) unless otherwise noted.)

=== Phonetics ===
==== Consonant inventory ====
Warndarang has a consonant inventory similar to that of many Australian languages. There are five main places of articulation – bilabial, apico-alveolar, retroflex, lamino-alveolar, and velar – with a stop and a nasal in each, with the addition of a rarely used interdental stop. There are also two laterals, two rhotics, and two semi-vowels. The presence of a glottal stop is debatable; the glottal stops that Heath heard were unstable and appeared to be optional.

As there is no standard Warndarang orthography, the following is used through this article. IPA symbols, when different from the presented orthography, are included in brackets.

	Peripheral		Laminal		Apical	
	Bilabial	Velar	Palatal	Dental	Alveolar	Retroflex
Plosives	b [p]	g [k]	j [c]	d̪ [t̪]	d [t]	ʈ
Nasals	m	ŋ	ɲ		n	ɳ
Laterals					l	ɭ
Tap					r [ɾ]	
Approximants	w		y [j]		ɻ	

==== Vowel inventory ====
Warndarang has three commonly used vowels: /a/, /i/, and /u/. A small number of words also contain an /e/, though there is some evidence that these are all loanwords. (Mara also has a very small quantity of lexical items containing an /e/, all of which are related to insect terminology.) Additionally, the vowel /o/ appears in exactly one Warndarang word: the interjection yo!, meaning 'yes, good!' and found in many nearby languages as well as in the local English-based creole. Heath observed no allophones within the five vowels.

=== Phonology ===
==== Rules for consonant clusters ====
Word- or stem-final clusters in Warndarang are formed by the combination of a lateral, rhotic, or semi-vowel (l, ɭ, r, ɻ, y, or w) and a velar or lamino-alveolar stop or nasal (g, ŋ, j, or ɲ). The only word- or stem-initial clusters are nasal-stop combinations in which the nasal is usually not pronounced.

Medial (inter-word or inter-stem) double consonant clusters are common. Nasal + stop clusters, both homorganic (formed with phonemes from the same place of articulation) and non-homorganic, are frequent, as are nasal + nasal clusters. Stop + nasal clusters are rare, but they do occur. Liquids (laterals or rhotics) can be combined with stops or nasals, though (stop or nasal) + liquid are not found. Geminate clusters (in which the same consonant is repeated twice) are found only in reduplicated words such as garaggarag, 'darter (Anhinga novaehollandiae)'.

Medial triple clusters are rare, though are seen in laterals or rhotics followed by homorganic (same place of articulation) nasal + stop clusters, as in buɻŋgar 'dirty water' (both /ŋ/ and /g/ are velar). A small number of reduplicated words display other consonant combinations, as in guralgguralg 'common koel (Eudynamys orientalis)'.

==== Rules for vowel clusters ====
When two vowels come into contact across morphemes, the cluster is simplified to one vowel. Gemination, the repetition of the same vowel, results in that vowel. Any vowel followed by an /i/ will become an /i/. /u/ + /a/ will become an /u/, and /a/ + /u/ will become an /a/. Heath was not able to acquire enough data to determine a rule for /i/ + /a/ or /i/ + /u/, and only the underlying triple-vowel sequence /uai/, which becomes an /i/, was observed out of all possible three-vowel combinations.

==== Rules for word-initial phonemes ====
At the beginnings of words or stems, apico-alveolar and retroflexed consonants are not distinguished. When words are reduplicated or pronounced directly after a vowel, however, Heath was able to hear slight retroflexion, and so these words are typically analyzed to begin with a retroflex, with the exceptions of /nd/ versus /ɳʈ/, in which Heath found a contrast, and the single word daga meaning 'sister', which was never heard as *ʈaga.

Nearly all Warndarang words begin with consonants; the few, chiefly adverbial, exceptions are posited by Heath as underlyingly beginning with a semivowel /w/ or /y/.

==== Rules for stops ====
Stops are typically voiced in all but syllable-final positions, where they are voiceless, and nearly all stops are lenis. The interdental stop d̪, however, which occurs primarily in loans from Nunggubuyu, is fortis and voiceless no matter its position. Nasal-stop combinations can occur only at the beginning of prefixed noun stems, though in prefix-less nouns only the stop is pronounced, with the sole exception of the archaic reduplicated verb mbir-mbir 'to make a nest'.

Stops occurring for the second time in words are frequently lenited: a second /b/ or /g/ will become a /w/ and a second /j/ a /y/. This pattern is usually observed in reduplicated words, as in gujirwujir 'jellyfish' or jaɻi-yaɻi 'to do continuously'. Exceptions occur, however – for example, there is no lenition in the word buwa-buwa 'to face punishment by spearing' and the noun mawaɻayimbirjimbir 'hook spear' has the first j leniting, not the second.

Stop nasalization occurs when a stop is followed by a nasal across a morpheme boundary, though such nasalization is optional: both giadmayi (underlying form) and gianmayi are acceptable forms of 'they (two) went'. Stop gemination across morpheme boundaries almost always results in simplification to a single phoneme.

==== Reduplication ====
Reduplication is found frequently in Warndarang. A reduplicated verb typically indicates that the action is repeated, done continuously, or performed by many people. For example, ala-biyi-wiyima means 'they were all fighting' and waɻ-waɻŋawiɳʈima means 'I saw him frequently'. In nouns and adjectives, reduplication often but not always takes the meaning of plurality, often with humans, as in wulu-muna-munaɳa-ɲu 'white people' or wu-ɭuɭga-ɭuɭga 'islands'.

Reduplication can be full (the entire word is repeated), monosyllabic (only one syllable of the word is repeated), or bisyllabic (two syllables of the word are repeated).

=== Nominal morphology ===
Nouns and adjectives can be distinguished in meaning only; they are treated identically grammatically. Therefore, when the word "noun" is used in this section, it refers to both nouns and adjectives.

==== Nominal classes ====
Nouns referring to humans fall into one of six classes, denoted by prefixes:

Nominal classes
Prefix	Meaning	
ɳa-	singular	masculine
ŋi-	singular	feminine
yiri-	dual (two of the noun)	
yili-	paucal (three, four, or five of the noun)	
wulu-	plural (more than five of the noun)	
ɻa-	indefinite	

The prefix ɻa- is used for human nouns where the number or gender are either unknown, unimportant, or clear from context.

There are also six noun classes for non-human nouns, also marked by prefixes. The assignment of nouns to a noun class is apparently arbitrary, though there are a few generalizations:

Prefix	Generalized usage
ɳa-	place names
ŋi-	animal terms
ɻa-	large animals
wu-	tree names
ma-	plants with edible underground portions
yiri-	dual (two of the noun)

Some nouns were found to vary in their noun classes, alternating prefixes without any apparent change in meaning. Note that while there is a singular-dual distinction, there is no morphological way to distinguish non-human singular nouns from non-human plural nouns.

==== Case markings ====
Nouns in Warndarang can be marked with suffixes for one of six cases:

grammatical cases
Suffix	Case	Meaning
-ø	nominative	
-wala	ablative	from X or after X
-miri	instrumental	by means of X
-ɲiyi	allative	to or toward X
-ni	purposive	to obtain X
-yaŋa	locative	in, at, on, into, or onto X

The nominative case is used for the subjects of clauses are well as both direct and indirect objects and in some situations where the instrumental or purposive might be more expected. Unlike in many other Australian languages, the subject–object distinction is marked on the verb and not on the noun.

Additionally, there is also an absolutive suffix, which is added before the locative or the nominative marking and to most unmarked nouns. This suffix depends on the last phoneme of the stem:

absolutive suffixes
Suffix	Environment
-yu	/i/
-ɲu	/u/, /a/, /y/
-u	laterals or rhotics
-gu	nasals or stops

There is also a rare diminutive suffix -gaɲa-.

==== Articles ====
In addition to the class markers, there are also articles that mark the number and gender of the nouns.

In human nouns, there are 4 articles. For non-human nouns, there are 6 articles corresponding to the non-human noun classes.

human noun articles
ɳa-nu	masculine singular
ŋa-nu	feminine singular
wuru-nu	dual (two of the noun)
wulu-nu	plural (three or more of the noun)

non-human noun articles
ɳa-nu	ɳa-prefixed nouns
ŋa-nu	ŋi-prefixed nouns
ɻa-nu	ɻa-prefixed nouns
wu-nu	wu-prefixed nouns
ma-nu	ma-prefixed nouns
wuru-nu	dual (yiri-prefixed nouns)

The -nu in these articles can be optionally omitted.

==== Kin terms ====
Typically, possession in Warndarang is simply marked with juxtaposition, in which a pronoun possessive and the possessor in the nominative case directly follows the possessed object. In kinship terms, however, possession is marked with special affixes. First person kinship possession is marked with ŋa-, second person kinship possession is marked with ø-, and third person by a noun class prefix and the absolutive suffix. There is no distinction of number in the possessors. For example:

ŋa-baba	my/our father
ŋa-bujin	my/our wife
ø-baba	your father
ø-bujin	your wife
ɳa-baba-ɲu	his/their father
ŋi-bujin-gu	his/their wife

Unfortunately, there is little data on kinship terminology; the semantic domains of each term within the system are unclear. Furthermore, the correct marker for plural kinship nouns, such as to say "his fathers", is unknown.

==== Vocatives ====
Vocatives, nouns referring to the person being addressed, include kinship terms and nouns capturing the person's age, gender, or social status. Personal names were typically not used to directly address a person. Kinship vocatives typically included possessive prefixes but not articles; e.g., ŋa-baba would mean 'my father' when the speaker addressed his or her father, while ɳa-nu ŋa-bana would mean 'my father' when the speaker was referring to his or her father in the presence of a third party.

There are also vocative interjections, used for obtaining the attention of the addressee: ɳamaɻ 'hey you' (singular), ŋudjuguɲay 'hey you' (dual), and ŋuduguɲay 'hey you' (plural).

==== Quantifiers ====
In addition to the classifiers and articles marking the singular/dual/paucal/plural distinction, Warndarang can also indicate the number of an object with quantifiers that precede the noun.

waŋgiɲ	'one'
wudŋuy	'two'
mudŋuy	'two'
muluŋuy	'a few' (three to five)
wudŋuy ɳa-gayi	'two another' (three)
ɻa-waŋgin ɻa-murji	'one hand' (five)
ɻa-waŋgin ɻa-murji baʈa ɻa-gayi ɻa-murji	'one hand, then another hand' (ten)

==== Pronouns ====
Independent Warndarang pronouns are distinguished by person (first, second, and third), number (singular, dual, and plural), gender (masculine versus feminine in the third-person singular) and inclusivity (dual/plural first person including the addressee or dual/plural first person excluding the addressee). Nonhuman pronouns also mark noun class. Possessive pronouns mark for person, number, and inclusivity, but not for gender or for non-human noun class.

Pronouns are also marked as prefixes on transitive and intransitive verbs, with different prefixes for different transitive pronoun combination. For instance, a first-person singular subject and a third-person singular object would be marked by the prefix ŋa-, but a third-person singular subject and a first-person singular object would cause the marking ŋara-. Furthermore, the form of these prefixes can depend on the environment, as a few prefixes have different forms depending on whether they precede a vowel, a nasal, or a non-nasal consonant.

		Role	Object											
		Person	First					Second			Intransitive	Third		
Role	Person	Number	Singular	Dual Exclusive	Plural Exclusive	Dual Inclusive	Plural Inclusive	Singular	Dual	Plural	Intransitive	Singular	Dual	Plural
Subject	First	Singular						ŋa-	ŋarŋu-	ŋalŋu-	ŋa-	ŋa-	ŋarŋu-	ŋalŋu-
Subject	First	Dual Exclusive						ñir(i)-	ñiriŋu-	ñiliŋu-	ñir(i)-, occasionally ñid-	ñir(i)-	ñiriŋu-	ñiliŋu-
Subject	First	Plural Exclusive						ñir(i)-	ñiriŋu-	ñiliŋu-	ñidi-	ñir(i)-	ñiriŋu-	ñiliŋu-
Subject	First	Dual Inclusive									ña- before C, ñan- before V	ña- before C, ñan- before V	ñarŋu-	ñalŋu-
Subject	First	Plural Inclusive									ŋala-	ŋala-	ŋalarŋu-	ŋalalŋu-
Subject	Second	Singular	ŋara-	ñiriru-	ñililu-						ñi-, ∅- in imperative	ñi-, ∅- in imperative	ñurŋu-	ñulŋu-
Subject	Second	Dual	ŋararu-	ñiriru-	ñililu-						Cud-, extended form Curi-	Curu-	Curŋu-	Culŋu-
Subject	Second	Plural	ŋararu-	ñiriru-	ñililu-						Cudu-	Curu-	Curŋu-	Culŋu-
Subject	Third	Singular	ŋara-	ñiriru-	ñililu-	ñararu-	ŋalalu-	ñi-	ŋururu-	ŋululu-	Wa-	Wa-	Warŋu-	Walŋu-
Subject	Third	Dual	ŋararu-	ñiriru-	ñililu-	ñalalu-	ŋalalu-	ñuru-	(?)	(?)	Wad-, War-	Wara-	Warŋu-	Walŋu-
Subject	Third	Plural	ŋararu-	ñiriru-	ñililu-	ñalalu-	ŋalalu-	ñuru-	(?)	(?)	Wala-	Wara-	Warŋu-	Walŋu-

==== Demonstrative pronouns ====
Demonstratives – pronouns that distinguish nouns using a particular frame of reference – in Warndarang are complex. The primary system describes where in space the object is, and is preceded by the noun-class prefix, here indicated by *.

*-niya	proximate
a-*-ni	immediate
*-wa, *-ni	near-distant
*-niɲi	distant
*-nɲaya	anaphoric

The "anaphoric" demonstrative is used when the demonstrative category is clear from context, often because it has recently been mentioned.

The suffix –wala, usually considered to be the ablative marker, can be added to a demonstrative to mean that the noun is moving toward the center of the frame of reference, an affix also found in the languages Ngandi and Nunggubuyu to the north. Likewise, the locative marker -yaŋa, when added to a demonstrative, takes the meaning of motion in any direction except that towards the center of the frame of reference. There is also an unproductive a-*-niɲi demonstrative, used with the class wu, to mean 'that one over there'.

==== Demonstrative adverbs ====
Each of the demonstrative pronouns can be taken with the prefix wu- and used as adverbs to indicate overall location rather than the location of a specific object. Like the demonstrative pronouns, the adverbs can also take the ablative suffix -wala. In this case, -wala adds the meaning of 'from', as in wu-niya-wala 'from there, near-distant', or of time, with wu-niya-wala glossed as 'after that'. These meanings are apparently identical to that of the adverb wudjiwa to mean 'after that' or 'from there'. Addition of the locative -yaŋa gives the adverb the meaning of 'in that direction'.

Adverbs for the cardinal directions are found in the locative, directional, and ablative cases, though their forms are fairly irregular:

	Locative	Directional	Ablative
East	gaŋu	yini-ɲi	ana-yini
West	argaɭi	argaɭi-ɲi	an-argaɭi
North	guymi	wuɲmi-ɲi	ana-wuɲmi
South	wagi	wayburi	ana-yiwayi

If the adverb in the locative is reduplicated, it takes the meaning of 'farther in that direction'. There are three other Warndarang directional adverbs not yet mentioned: arwaɻ 'region up from the coast', yaɭburi 'downward', and wanga-ɲi 'in another direction'.

=== Verbal morphology ===
The most basic verb complex in Warndarang consists of a pronominal prefix (see above), an inflected verb stem, and a set of suffixes marking tense, mood, and aspect. There might be other prefixes in front of the pronominal prefix, such as the negative gu- or the potential u-.

In some constructions, there is a "main verb," which presents the basic idea, and then an inflectable "auxiliary verb" which refines the meaning of the main verb. If that is the case, the main verb becomes one of the prefixes to the auxiliary verb.

Some Warndarang verbs can only serve as main verbs and some only as auxiliary verbs, though most can serve as either.

==== Verbal suffixes ====
The suffix of a verbal complex can indicate one of the following eight categories: past actual punctual, past actual continuous or future positive continuous, past irrealis, present actual, present irrealis, future positive punctual, future negative, or imperative. Positive and irrealis forms require the potential prefix u-.

The forms of this suffix depend on the verb to which they are added. For example:

	-ba- 'to hit, to kill'	-ida- (auxiliary verb) 'forcible manipulation of an object'	-ilama- 'to cut up'
past actual punctual	-ba-ø	-ida-ø	-ilami-ø
past actual continuous future positive continuous	-bu-ɻa	-ida-ŋa-ø	-ilama-ŋa-ø
past irrealis	-bi-ni	idi-ø	-ilami-ø
present actual	-ba-ri	-ida-ŋa-ni	-ilama-ŋa-ni
present irrealis	-ba-ri	-ida-ŋa-ri	-ilama-ŋa-ri
future positive punctual	-b-iɲ	-id-iɲu	-ilam-iɲu-
future negative	-bi-ø	-ida-ø	-ilami-ø
imperative	-bi-ŋu	-ida-ø	?

==== Reflexive-reciprocal ====
Reflexive/reciprocal markers are included within the inflected verb stem. The reflexive marker is -i- and indicates either 'do to oneself' or a passive meaning. For example, ɭar-ŋa-g-i-ma-ø could either mean 'I cut myself' or 'I was cut', with the -g-i- the reflexive form of the root -ga-. A few verb stems can take the reflexive to indicate that the object is unimportant, such as in the transitive verb–auxiliary pair war+ga meaning 'to sing (about something)' in the form war-ŋa-g-i-ma-ø to mean 'I was singing', with no object, rather than 'I was singing about myself' or 'a song about me was being sung'.

The reciprocal marker is -yi- or occasionally -ji- in some older forms. Both the reflexive and reciprocal markers have cognates in Nunggubuyu and Ngandi.

==== Negation ====
A verbal complex in the negative always begins with the prefix gu-. In complexes where the pronominal prefix is either third person intransitive or third-to-third transitive, the prefix -yu- is also included, after the negative and after the main verb (if there is one) but before the pronominal prefix.

==== Other verbal prefixes ====
After the negative gu- prefix comes the opportunity for the prefix -ɻaŋani- meaning 'no one' and indicating that "no one" is the subject of the verbal complex. After this slot comes the benefactive -ma-, which indicates that the pronominal prefix of a transitive verb is referring to the indirect object rather than to the direct object (the default assumption). After this slot comes the rare prefix -man-, whose meaning Heath was unable to determine but appears to indicate the speaker's involvement in the verbal complex.

After these four possible prefixes would come the main verb, if there was one, and then the centripetal prefix -ya- to indicate that the action is directed towards the frame of reference rather than away from it. The word ŋa-gaya, for instance, means 'I took it', but the addition of ya- to ya-ŋa-gaya shifts the meaning to 'I brought it'. After the centripetal prefix would come the third-person negation prefix (see above) and then finally the potential prefix -u- to indicate possibility, that something can, should, could have, or should have been done.

==== Compounding ====
The process of verbal compounding is not as productive in Warndarang as it is in surrounding languages, though it does occur, usually when an adverb is added to the beginning of the main verb of the verbal complex. These are distinguished from simple juxtaposition (in which the adverb would not be part of the verbal complex) in that prefixes such as the negative gu- precede the adverb.

==== Interrogation ====
To ask a yes/no question in Warndarang, an assertion is stated with a slight intonational difference (rise on the penultimate syllable, fall on the ultimate syllable, as opposed to a level tone falling off), though jabay 'maybe' can be added to the end of the statement to underscore the questioning nature. The first would be the equivalent of the English "you're going to the store?" and the second of "you're going to the store, right?".

Other sorts of questions require interrogative particles, usually preceded by the noun classifier wu-. The word meaning 'what thing?' is wu-ngaŋa, for example, which can be turned to 'why?' by adding the purposive -ni to create wu-ngaŋa-ni or the purposive and the word aru 'because', aru wu-ngaŋa-ni. The particle 'when', however, is mala-wunga, probably from wunga meaning 'to do what?' though mala- as a prefix is found nowhere else in Warndarang.

=== Syntax ===
Rather as in English, most Warndarang clauses are subject–verb (SV) for intransitive clauses and agent–verb–object (AVO) for transitive clauses. Other orders are possible, however, with clauses rearranged in what is known as focusing.

==== Focusing ====
To focus (emphasize) a component of a Warndarang sentence, the constituent is brought to the beginning of the clause, separated from the remaining words with the particle wu-nu. For example, the statement ɲala-ɲala wu-nu ŋabaɻu-ŋa-maɻi 'I nearly died' focuses ɲala-ɲala, emphasizing that the speaker nearly died. In English, this is primarily done through tone; in German, this is done by placing the constituent in the first position within the phrase.

Focusing is often used to indicate clause subordination, though replacing wu-nu with an article that agrees with the head noun more formally indicates relative clauses. For example, the focused ɳa-jawulba-ɲu wu-nu ŋabaɻa-mi 'the old man who died' could also be stated as ɳa-jawulba-ɲu ɳa-nu ŋabaɻa-mi, with the ɳa-nu referring to the masculine, singular state of ɳa-jawulba-ɲu, 'the old man'.

==== Nominalization ====
Nominalization, the transformation of a verb or member of another non-nominal syntactic class into a noun, is rare in Warndarang, with just a few, unproductive examples in the text. There is one recorded instance of -maŋgara being added to a verb to mean 'the time at which the action occurred': mud-maŋgara, from mud 'to break', follows the well-attested word ʈuʈul 'right up to, all the way to' to mean 'up to the point of breaking'. Similarly, there is one record of wu-ŋgar-maɳjar-ni, from -ɳgar- 'to dance', to mean 'for dancing'.

==== Conditional clauses ====
Heath was unable to elicit or find any conditional constructions ("if X, then Y") during his study; the closest examples in the text use the word jabay 'maybe' ("Maybe he will come, maybe I will kill him") or place both clauses within the past potential.

The word aru 'because', however, was often used to construct clauses meaning 'because of X, Y did Z'.

== Example sentences ==
The first two sentences are taken from Heath 1980. The third sentence is from Heath 1984. All were spoken by Isaac Joshua and published by Heath with his permission.

Wu-nu wu-niya ɻa-maɻawuriɳa, ɻa-maɻawuriɳa, wu-nu jaɻag-jaɻagara-bani, yo, wu-naya wu-nu ʈiwar-ija yo, mangarŋararu-ba.
NH.CL-ART NH.CL-PROX {NH.CL-magical poison} {NH.CL-magical poison} NH.CL-ART {make continuously-3P.SBJ>3S.OBJ-AUX} yes-INTERJ NH.CL-PROX NH.CL-ART {to throw-3P.SBJ>3S.OBJ-AUX} yes-INTERJ {throw on body-3P.SBJ>1S.OBJ-AUX}
Heath's translation: 'This is magical poison. They always make poison. Someone threw it here, someone threw it on my body.'

- Wu-nu: wu non-human noun classifier, nu article
- wu-niya: wu non-human noun classifier, proximate demonstrative niya
- ɻa-maɻawuriɳa: ɻa non-human noun classifier, maɻawuriɳa 'magical poison'
- jaɻag-jaɻagara-bani: jaɻag-jaɻag 'make continuously' (reduplication of 'make'), ara pronoun prefix (third person plural subject, third person singular object), bani auxiliary verb
- yo: interjection 'yes', used frequently in narratives
- wu-naya: wu non-human noun classifier, naya from proximate demonstrative niya
- ʈiwar-ija: ʈiw 'to throw', ar from pronoun prefix ara (third person plural subject, third person singular object), ija auxiliary verb
- mangarŋararu-ba: magar 'throw on body', ŋararu pronoun prefix (third person plural subject, first person singular object), ba auxiliary verb

2) Gu-ɻaŋani-biŋju-ga, wu-yagu wu-njaɻi, ɻa-njaɻi ŋaldudga-jani ɻa-ŋuɳu-ɲu.

Heath's translation: 'There were so many fish that no one could have caught them all.'

- Gu-ɻaŋani-biŋju-ga: gu negative prefix, ɻaŋani no one, biŋ 'finish', ju third person negation, zero marking pronoun prefix (third person singular subject, third person singular object), ga auxiliary verb
- wu-yagu: wu non-human noun classifier, yagu 'not'
- wu-njaɻi: wu non-human noun classifier, njaɻi 'many'
- ɻa-njaɻi: ɻa non-human noun classifier, njaɻi 'many'
- ŋaldudga-jani: ŋaldud 'abundant', ga pronoun prefix (third person singular subject), jani auxiliary verb
- ɻa-ŋuɳu-ɲu: ɻa non-human noun classifier, ŋuɳu 'fish', ɲu absolutive suffix

Gu-ɻaŋani-biŋju-ga, wu-yagu wu-njaɻi, ɻa-njaɻi ŋaldudga-jani ɻa-ŋuɳu-ɲu.
{NEG-no one-finish-3.NEG-AUX} NH.CL-not NH.CL-many NH.CL-many abundant-3SG.SUB-AUX NH.CL-fish-ABS
Heath's translation: 'There were so many fish that no one could have caught them all.'

3) Wu-nɲaya, wiya ara-ŋama-ŋama ɻa-yaraman-gu wu-nɲya-wala wu-nu ʈuɳg-iŋa ʈuʈul wu-niɲi Roper Valley.

Heath's translation: 'There they [Long Peter, the subject of the narrative, and companions] ate some of the horses. Then they left for Roper Valley.'

- Wu-nɲaya: wu non-human noun classifier, nɲaya there (anaphoric form, refers to Hodgson Downs)
- wiya: 'enough'
- ara-ŋama-ŋama: ara pronoun prefix (third person plural subject third person singular object), ŋama 'ate' (reduplicated to mean 'ate continuously or repeatedly')
- ɻa-yaraman-gu: ɻa non-human noun classifier for large animals, yaraman 'horse', gu absolutive
- wu-nɲya-wala: wu-nɲya same as above, wala absolutive marker
- wu-nu: wu non-human noun classifier, nu article
- ʈuɳg-iŋa: ʈuɳ 'set off' (i.e., leave, depart) main verb, g pronoun prefix (third person singular subject), iŋa auxiliary verb
- ʈuʈul: 'all the way to'
- wu-niɲi: wu non-human noun classifier, niɲi demonstrative (distant)

== Comparison of the Maran languages ==
Warndarrang (a language extinct since 1974) and Marra (a language with only a small number of partial speakers) are each other's closest relatives. Together with Alawa (a language extinct since the early 1970s) and Yugul (listed separately in AUSTLANG, a language attested by speakers of Warndarang, Marra, and Alawa but apparently extinct, though the community is still thriving), these languages form the Maran subgroup of the Gunwinyguan language family. The three documented languages share much vocabulary and have many similar grammatical structures, though there are significant differences, and Warndarang has been heavily influenced by loanwords from Nunggubuyu and Ngandi to the north.

=== Verbal comparison ===
All three languages are prefixing, and their verbs consist of either a single inflected stem or an uninflected "main verb" preceding an inflected auxiliary verb. Such verbal particles are absent in the languages to the north. The Maran languages also share verbal features such as particle reduplication within the verbal complex indicating a repeated or continuous action (a pattern common in Australian languages), and the negation of verbs is indicated by a particle immediately preceding the verb complex (gu in both Warndarang and Mara but ŋayi in Alawa).

Mara has a significantly more complex verbal inflection system than Warndarang (sixteen different tense/aspect/mood categories in Mara but only eight in Warndarang and apparently seven in Alawa), an unusually intricate system for Australian languages. Both languages, however, have conjugation paradigms that are highly verb-specific.

In addition to the similarities in the order of the verb complex, Mara and Warndarang also both use word order to focus, or highlight, a particular item within the clause, though otherwise the word order in Mara is far stricter than that in Warndarang.

=== Nominal comparison ===
Alawa divides its nouns into two genders (masculine and feminine) while Mara has three classes (masculine, feminine, and neuter) and Warndarang six. All three languages distinguish between singular, dual, and plural, with Warndarang having an additional "paucal" (three to five) class for human nouns. The use of noun cases in Warndarang and Mara are nearly identical – Mara condenses the allative and locative cases and adds a pergressive case – though the only cognate across the paradigm is the purposive -ni. The case marking system of Alawa is apparently not related. The demonstratives in Warndarang and Mara cover approximately the same semantic categories (proximate, immediate, distant, and anaphoric, though Warndarang adds an intermediate near-distant), though the forms themselves have little similarity. In fact, the Mara demonstratives inflect for case, number, and gender, while Warndarang demonstratives engage a single basic form. Again, the Alawa demonstrative system is entirely separate, drawing only a single distance distinction ("this" versus "that") but with more nuanced anaphoric distinctions.

The directional terminology between Warndarang and Mara shares many cognates, such as gargaɭi (Mara) and argaɭi (Warndarang) for 'west' or guymi (both languages) for 'north', though Mara again has a far more intricate and irregular morphological system to distinguish cases in these terms. Mara also has an up/down directional distinction that is absent in Warndarang. There is no Alawa data for cardinal directions.

=== Lexical comparison ===
Cultural terminology between the three languages is distinct. Mara has an extremely complex kinship terminology system, including a large number of dyadic terms; Warndarang's system appeared to be much simpler, though the linguist Jeffrey Heath was unable to elicit much kinship information before his informant died. Alawa has a morphologically irregular system similar to Mara's, but lacks the dyadic terms and shares few cognates (exceptions include baba for 'older sibling'). A cursory analysis of the flora-fauna terms in the three languages also reveals few cognates. The semi-moieties in Warndarang and Mara have nearly identical names, however, though the groups were associated with different totems, songs, and rituals.

== See also ==
- Non-Pama–Nyungan languages
