= Minyerri, Northern Territory =

Minyerri
- Town
- Coordinates: 15°13′40″S 134°04′42″E
- Country: Australia
- State: Northern Territory
- LGA: Roper Gulf Region

Government
  - Territory electorate: Arnhem
  - Federal division: Lingiari

Population
  - Total: 618 (2016)
- Postcode: 0852

Minyerri, alternatively spelt as Miniyeri or Miniyerri is a town located 240 km south-east of Katherine in the Northern Territory. The town has a population of 618 people, and is part of the Roper Gulf Shire Council area. The languages spoken in this community include Alawa, Kriol and English.

The services available in the community include preschool, primary and secondary educational services, a women's centre, a Centrelink storefront, two retail stores, a police station, and an air strip.

There is mobile phone coverage in the area, and a mail plane visits every Tuesday.

A permit is required for non-Aboriginal people to enter the community. The Hodgson River is in close proximity. The area experiences both Wet and Dry seasons, with temperatures ranging from Dry season overnight lows of 10 °C through to daytime highs of 40 °C in the buildup. The annual rainfall is 800–1000 mm.

The community has been resisting plans to frack the area for shale gas, due to concerns about the impacts on their pastoral leases and herbal medicine industry.
