= Yukul people =

Indigenous people of the Northern Territory, Australia

The Yukul, also written Jukul, were an indigenous Australian people of the Northern Territory.

== Language ==
Little to no material has been salvaged of the Yukul language, since it was never studied; no examples of their speech that would allow grammatical analysis exist, and only a few words were taken down. Though believed to be similar to Alawa and Marra, there is no evidence for such an inference. Most of the younger generation now speak a variety of kriol.

== Country ==
Yukul lands covered an estimated 600 square miles (1,600 km^{2}). on the southern bank of the Roper River at the mouth of the Hogson River and around Leichhardt Bar (Urapunga). Their northern boundary lay around Mount Favenc.

== Social organization ==
A brief description of their class divisions was given by R. H. Mathews in 1900.

== History ==
A massive land seizure in the densely populated Gulf Country started in 1881, with 14 colonial landholders taking up stations that averaged some 16,000 square kilometres (6,200 mi^{2}) each. Within the following 3 decades an estimated 600 indigenous people were shot down to make way for the cattle and sheep pastured on these runs. A Church Mission was established at Ngukurr in 1908 to take in the remnants of decimated tribes.

== Recent times ==
Many Yukul now live at Ngukurr.

== Alternative names ==
- Jokul
- Yikil, Yookil, Yookull
- Yikul
- Yookala
- Yukul

Source: Tindale 1974, p. 227

== Sources ==
- Adone, Dany (2003). "Restricted Verb Movement in Ngukurr kriol". In Adone, Dany (ed.). Recent Development in Creole Studies. Walter de Gruyter. pp. 91–108. ISBN 978-3-110-94831-8.
- Mathews, R. H. (1900). "Marriage and descent among the Australian aborigines". Journal of the Proceedings of the Royal Society of New South Wales. 34. Sydney: 120–135. doi:10.5962/p.359341. S2CID 259735456.
- Roberts, Tony (November 2009). "The brutal truth: What happened in the gulf country The Monthly Essays November". The Monthly.
- Sharpe, Margaret (2008). "Alawa and Its Neighbours: Enigma Variations 1 and 2". In Bowern, Claire; Evans, Bethwyn; Miceli, Luisa (eds.). Morphology and Language History: In honour of Harold Koch. John Benjamins Publishing. pp. 59–70. ISBN 978-3-110-27977-1.
- Spencer, Baldwin (1914). Native tribes of the Northern Territory of Australia (PDF). London: Macmillan Publishers.
- Tindale, Norman Barnett (1974). "Jukul (NT)". Aboriginal Tribes of Australia: Their Terrain, Environmental Controls, Distribution, Limits, and Proper Names. Australian National University.
