= Marra language =

Australian Aboriginal language

Marra
- Marranbala
- Pronunciation: [mara]
- Native to: Australia
- Region: Arnhem Land, Northern Territory
- Ethnicity: Marra people
- Native speakers: 8 (2016 census)
- Language family: Arnhem: Marran; Marra

Language codes
- ISO 639-3: mec
- Glottolog: mara1385
- AIATSIS: N112
- ELP: Marra

Marra, sometimes formerly spelt Mara, is an Australian Aboriginal language, traditionally spoken on an area of the Gulf of Carpentaria coast in the Northern Territory around the Roper, Towns and Limmen Bight Rivers. Marra is now an endangered language. The most recent survey was in 1991; at that time, there were only 15 speakers, all elderly. Most Marra people now speak Kriol as their main language. The remaining elderly Marra speakers live in the Aboriginal communities of Ngukurr, Numbulwar, Borroloola and Minyerri.

Marra is a prefixing language with three noun classes (masculine, feminine, and neuter) and a singular-plural-dual distinction. It is characterized by an intricate aspectual system, elaborate kin terms, no definite structure for relative clause construction, and a complex demonstrative system. Unlike many languages in the area, it has little avoidance language and no difference in the speech of male and female speakers.

== Language and speakers ==
Marra is a member of the Arnhem family, the second-largest Australian language family after Pama–Nyungan. The Marra people refer to themselves as Marranbala or Marra, and their language as Marra. In addition to Warndarrang, which was spoken to the north of Marra along the Roper River, Marra was also in contact with Alawa (spoken inland, to the west), Binbinga and Wilangarra (West Barkly languages to the south), and Yanyuwa (a Pama–Nyungan language to the southeast).

The Marra people were traditionally divided into three clans that lived along the Limmen Bight River in Arnhem Land (Northern Territory, Australia): burdal, murrungun, and mambali. In the 1970s, when the first serious fieldwork was being done on Marra, the mambali clan was extinct, though a family with the surname Riley of the burdal clan and a man by the name of Anday of the murrungun clan were able to provide the linguist Jeffrey Heath with cultural and linguistic information.

The three clans, together with the Warndarrang-speaking guyal group, made up a set of four patrilineal semimoieties, each of which had their own set of songs, myths, and rituals. Each semimoiety was also associated with a totem (olive python or fork-tailed catfish for mambali, goanna for guyal, black-headed python or antilopine kangaroo for burdal, and king brown snake for murrungun) and had responsibilities for that totem. Note that Warndarang people use the same system of semimoieties, under the names mambali, murrungun, wurdal, and guyal (wuyal).

In the years 1973–1975 and 1976–1977, the linguist Jeffrey Heath worked with some of the surviving speakers of Marra to create a sizeable grammar and dictionary. With the help of four principal informants – Mack Riley, Tom Riley, Johnnie (who was Warndarrang but spoke Marra and Nunggubuyu for most of his life), and Anday – Heath was able to collect grammar and vocabulary information as well as extensive texts on clan songs and totem rituals.

== Marra grammar ==
(All grammatical information from Heath 1981 unless otherwise noted.)

=== Phonetics ===
==== Consonant inventory ====
Marra has a consonant inventory nearly identical to those of Warndarrang and Alawa. There are two additional phonemes: the interdental /n̪/ and /l̪/ which occur only in a few flora-fauna terms, and are likely loanwords from either Nunggubuyu or Yanyuwa, both of which languages use these phonemes frequently.

With the interdentals excepted, the Marra consonants consist of a stop and a nasal in each of five places of articulation with two laterals, two rhotics, and two semivowels.

A standard orthography has been developed over several years of work with Diwurruwurru-Jaru Aboriginal Corporation (also known as the Katherine Regional Aboriginal Language Centre). The standard orthography is used throughout this article, but the table below also gives the equivalent IPA symbols in brackets where appropriate. The interdental sounds have not been included in the table as they are only found in loanwords.

	Peripheral		Laminal	Apical	
	Bilabial	Velar	Alveolar		Retroflex
Plosive	p ⟨b⟩	k ⟨g⟩	c ⟨j⟩	t ⟨d⟩	ʈ ⟨rd⟩
Nasal	m	ŋ ⟨ng⟩	ɲ ⟨ny⟩	n	ɳ ⟨rn⟩
Vibrant				r ⟨rr⟩	
Lateral				l	ɭ ⟨rl⟩
Approximant	w		j ⟨y⟩	ɻ ⟨r⟩	

It is not clear if the vibrant is a trill or a tap.

==== Vowel inventory ====
Marra has three main vowels:

	Front	Back
High	i	u
Low	a	

The vowel /e/ is found in exactly two words, renburr, "paper wasp", and reywuy, "sandfly", and the vowel /o/ in one word, yo!, a common interjection meaning "yes!" found throughout the area, including in the local English-based creole.

There is no contrast in Marra vowel length, though the first vowel of a two-syllable word is often lengthened, as are the word-final vowels in a particular style of story-telling.

Words cannot begin with a vowel, with the exception of a handful of stems beginning with /a/.

=== Phonology ===
==== Clusters ====
Vowels clusters do not occur; all but one of adjacent underlying vowels are deleted. The only permitted word-initial consonant clusters are homorganic (involving the same place of articulation) nasal + stop combinations, particularly mb or ngg. The nominative prefix n-, when added to a stem beginning with a cluster, is usually pronounced with the preceding syllable, and the n- with combined with /r/ or /n/ results in the addition of the meaningless particle –nga- between the prefix and the stem.

Word-final consonant clusters can only take the form liquid (lateral or rhotic) plus noncoronal (labial, laminoalveolar, or velar) stop or nasal. Within a word, triple clusters are limited to a liquid and a homorganic nasal + stop cluster or to a liquid, a noncoronal, and any other consonant. Examples of this include gurralgmaninja, "kookaburra", and bulnggan, "extinguished fire". Many double-consonant clusters can occur.

==== Lenition ====
In segments that are repeated in a word – either by reduplication or by chance morphology – the second stop is often lenited into a semivowel or lost altogether. /j/ and /ʈ/ will become /y/, /b/ will become /w/, and /g/ will either become /w/ or Ø. This lenition can optionally occur at the beginning of a small number of nouns when the stem is preceded by a prefix ending in a vowel.

There are also several instances of word-initial lenition of /g/ or /b/ to /w/, in cardinal directions, kin terms, and a few other isolated examples. At the beginning of verb stems, the underlying combination rrn will have the surface form of n, whereas an n followed by the phonemes l, rl, rr, r, n, or ny in any other context results in the deletion of the initial n.

==== Nasalization ====
Stops are frequently nasalized (pronounced as the nasal at the stop's place of articulation) when followed by a nasal or any other non-stop. Examples of this include the reduplicated man-mad "to mix a lot" from mad "to mix" or the noun + case ending of nga-lurlbam-nyu from lurlbab "juvenile euro (Macropus robustus)".

=== Nominal morphology ===
In Marra, there is no clear grammatical distinction between nouns, adjectives, and adverbs; they are all treated the same morphologically. Personal and demonstrative pronouns, however, each form a distinctive word class, and all can be clearly distinguished from verb complexes.

Noun phrases typically consist of an article, a noun, and the possibilities for adjuncts, which often but not always follow the main noun.

==== Articles ====
Nouns are usually preceded by an article, which marks case, gender, and number. The nominative articles, for instance, are as follows:

nominative articles
masculine singular	nana
feminine singular	ngana
neuter	n-gana
dual	warra
plural	wala

==== Case prefixes ====
In additional to the articles, each noun is marked with a prefix containing information about case (nominative or non-nominative), gender (masculine, feminine, or neuter), and number (singular, plural, dual), as follows:

Case prefixes
	Nominative	Non-nominative
Masculine singular	ø-	na-
Feminine singular	n-	ya-
Neuter	n-	nya-
Dual	wurr-	wirri-
Plural	wul-	wili-

Almost all non-human singular nouns are marked as masculine, though some specifically-female marsupial terms can be marked as feminine. The neuter case is reserved for body parts, topographic terms, abstract conceptions, and the word gurnarru, "sun".

==== Case suffixes ====
Nouns in Marra are marked by suffixes for one of six cases:

1. nominative
2. ergative/instrumental/genitive
3. allative/locative
4. ablative
5. pergressive
6. purposive

The nominative (-ø) is used for intransitive subjects or transitive objects – such a case is usually called the "absolutive", though some languages to the south of Marra have an absolutive case that is distinct from this usage.

The ergative or instrumental case (also –ø, though takes the non-nominative prefix) is used to mark the subject of a transitive verb (the usual meaning of "ergative") or to mark the object used to complete the action of the verb (the usual meaning of "instrumental"). This case, along with a genitive pronoun, is also used to mark possession (see below).

The allative/locative case (-yurr) signals the idea of direction of motion ("to X"), static location ("in/on/at X"), or motional location ("by/through X"). Though this meaning is within the domain of the pergressive case in many related languages, the Marra pergressive (-ya, "through" or "along") is restricted to body-part or topographic terms.

The ablative case is used to specify the origin of motion. It takes the form –yani for most nouns but -yana for place names.

Lastly, the purposive –ni indicates the goal of the verb, as in the sentence bu-ngarlini na-yija-ni, "I set fires for game" (i.e., in order to hunt or obtain game), where the verb bu-ngarlini is intransitive and thus yija, "game" takes the purposive and not the nominative.

==== Possession ====
Possession is typically marked by a genitive pronoun, though if the possessor noun (in the ergative/instrumental case) is present the pronoun is sometimes omitted. For example, n-nga-radburr n-jawurru means "his camp" with the third person singular genitive pronoun jawurru, and either nariyi-marr n-nga-radburr n-jawurru or nariyi-marr n-nga-radburr can mean "the man's camp."

==== Quantifiers ====
Marra has five basic numerals, one through five:

1	wanggij or wangginy	"one"
2	wurruja	"two"
3	wurruja-gayi	"two-another"
4	wurruja wurruja	"two two"
5	mani n-murrji	"like hand"

The numerals six through ten are expressed by combining "five" with another number, e.g., mani n-murrji wurruja wurruja for "nine". There are also more general quantifiers such as jari and mijimbangu, "many"; dangulirrnya, "big group" (non-human); garnyirrimba, "big group" (human); and murrgu, "a few".

==== Reduplication ====
Like many Australian languages, Marra has a process known as reduplication, where some or all of a stem is repeated. With human nouns, reduplication takes the meaning of three or more of that noun, such as jawu-yawulba, "three or more old people" from jawulba, "old person", and a few topographic nouns can be reduplicated to mean the collective plural, as in lurlga-lurlga, "islands".

With both human and non-human nouns, reduplication along with the pergressive case suffix can create the meaning "having X" or "having lots of X", as in girri-girriya-ya, "having a woman" (being a married man) from girriya, "woman".

A few verb stems also display partial reduplication to indicate a repeated action, as in da-dad-gujujunyi, "he repeatedly tied it or them up" as opposed to dad-gujujunyi, "he was tying it or them up".

==== Personal pronouns ====
In addition to the pronoun markers on nouns (see above) and verbs (see below), Marra also has independent personal pronouns. Unlike other nouns, pronouns do not show a nominative/ergative distinction but instead use the nominative form to mark all subjects as well as the direct object of a transitive verb. Because these pronouns are marked within the verb clause, their inclusion is often optional and can be used to highlight a particular point in what is known as the "emphatic" case.

Personal pronouns have paradigms in seven cases – nominative, emphatic, genitive, ablative, oblique stem, allative/locative, and purposive – for each of first person (singular, exclusive dual, inclusive dual, exclusive plural, and inclusive plural), second person (singular, dual, and plural), and third person (masculine singular, feminine singular, neuter singular, dual, and plural).

==== Demonstrative pronouns ====
There are five categories for demonstrative pronouns: proximate, localized immediate, unlocalized immediate, distant, and anaphoric. With the proximate stems, there are separate forms for predicative (in the "predicate" of the sentence, or the part that modifies the subject) or nonpredicative nouns.

Proximate refers to the area around the speaker, the equivalent of "here". The immediate refers to the area around the person being addressed or to the area approximately two meters away from the speaker. The localized immediate specifies the location, whereas the unlocalized immediate, which is rarer, is more general.

The distant category refers to anything outside of the immediate, either visible to the speaker or invisible. The anaphoric category is anything within the distant category that has previously been referred to, indicating that the location is not new to the discourse.

These pronouns have separate forms for masculine singular, feminine singular, neuter, dual, and plural, each of which has a nominative and non-nominative form. They are generally formed by the prefixes ni- MSG, ngi- FSG, n-gi- NEUT, wirr- or warra- DU, and wil- or wila- PL for the nominative or na- MSG, ya- FSG, nya- NEUT, wirri- DU, and wili- PL for the non-nominative and the suffixes -nya (non-predicative proximate), -n-garra (predicative proximate), -ya (unlocalized immediate), -yarra (localized immediate), -nanya or -ninya (distant), and -nangga or -ningga (anaphoric), though there are irregular forms for some combinations.

From these, one can form demonstrative adverbs, in the locative or allative cases. These have the same spatial meaning as the corresponding demonstrative pronouns, but they refer to a general location rather than the location of a specific noun. The allative forms are summarized in the following table:

Allative forms
Proximate	predicative	gin.garra
Proximate	non-predicative	ginya
Immediate	localized	gayarra
Immediate	unlocalized	gaya
Distant		gananya
Anaphoric		ganangga

To make the locative forms, the gi-/ga- in the table above is replaced by the prefix wi-/nya- (proximate), warri-/nyarri- (immediate), or wani-/nyani- (distant or anaphoric), and the suffix -yu(rr) is added.

==== Cardinal directions ====
Like many of the languages of Arnhem Land, Marra's cardinal directions correspond closely with English "north, south, east, west", but have intricate case morphology.

	West	East	North	South
Simple locative ("in the west")	garrgali	gangu	guymi	bayi
Distant locative ("far in the west")	garrgala	ganga	guyma	baya
Emphatic distant locative	garrgarrgala	ganga-ganga	guyma-guyma	baya-baya
Pergressive ("along/across the west")	garrgala-marryi	ganga-marryi	guyma-marryi	baya-marryi
Allative ("westward")	warrgali	nguwirri	yimbirri	wayburri
Ablative ("from the west")	warrgali-yana	wangga-yana	yimi-yana	wa-yana
Lateral ("on the western side")	warrgarrgali-yana	wanggangga-yana	yimiyimi-yana	wayawa-yana

There are also directional words for "up" and "down" (i.e., upriver, downhill, etc.) that display a similar morphological complexity:

up		down	
locative	garraja	locative (inside, under)	yigal
locative	warraja	locative (on the bottom)	wurlungun
pergressive	warraja–marryi	pergressive (along the bottom)	wurlungun-marryi
allative (uphill, upriver)	warrajarri	pergressive (inside, along the bottom)	wurlungunyi
vertical allative (straight up)	garraja-wili	allative (downward)	warlburri
lateral	warraji-yana	ablative (from below)	wirlyana
lateral	warrarraji-yana	lateral (on the bottom side)	wirlya-wirl-yana

==== Interrogation ====
Yes–no questions in Marra are identical to assertions, with a slight intonation difference. There is no tag for these statements (an equivalent to the English "right?" or "aren't you?"), though the local English-based creole's question marker ngi occasionally appears in modern Marra speech.

Other types of interrogative clauses involve words that can also take an indefinite form, as in ngani, which can mean "who?", "someone", or "anyone". If the distinction between interrogative and indefinite is unclear from context, the adverb jabay "maybe" can be added to indicate that the phrase is an assertion and not a question.

These interrogative words take a prefix to mark number and gender – masculine singular is the default, though any additional presupposed information can be included in the marking. Case suffixes can also be marked. These particles are typically clause-initial and then followed by the assertion whose details are being elicited. For instance, na-nginjani-ni wu-rlini? literally means "for what? he went" with the sense of "why did he go?" and nginjani gana rag-ninyi? means "what? you killed it" or "what did you kill?".

=== Verbal morphology ===
A basic verb complex in Marra consists of a pronominal prefix, an inflectable verb-stem, and suffixes marking tense, aspect, and mood. Often, however, there is an uninflectable "main verb" that specifies the meaning of the verb that is then followed by the inflectable "auxiliary verb". Some verbs in Marra can only be main verbs or auxiliary verbs, though many can serve in both positions.

==== Order of the verb complex ====
The morphemes of the verb are ordered in the complex as follows:

1. Negative (prefix gu- or preceding word ganagu or ŋula)
2. Benefactive ma- or marl-
3. Main verb
4. Centripetal ya- or nga-
5. Third person present marker –wa-
6. Pronoun prefix
7. Reduplication of any prior prefixes
8. Durative stem-initial prefix
9. Auxiliary verb
10. Tense, aspect, mood suffix
11. Reflexive/reciprocal suffix -rlana

The benefactive prefix indicates that something was done "for" somebody as, as in ma-rang-nan.ganyi, "he killed it for me". Ma- is used when there is a main-auxiliary distinction; marl- is used when there is only one verb in the complex. The centripetal particle is used to indicate motion within the speaker’s frame of reference, with the idea of the motion coming "back" or "This way". It is the only way to distinguish the meaning of verbs "to take" from "to bring" or "to go" from "to come".

==== Inflectional categories ====
Marra has sixteen possible inflectional (tense/aspect/mood) categories:

- Past punctual positive
- Past continuous durative positive
- Past continuous nondurative positive
- Past potential positive
- Past potential negative
- Past negative
- Present negative
- Present positive
- Evitative positive
- Future indefinite positive
- Future punctual positive
- Future continuous durative positive
- Future continuous nondurative positive
- Imperative positive
- Desiderative positive
- Future negative

Marra aspect is split between continuous and punctual (also known as "perfective") actions, with the former divided into durative (happened throughout) and non-durative (happened over time, but not the entire time). The positive/negative division distinguishes things that did, are, or will happen from things that did not, are not, or will not happen, a category termed in the analyses of some neighboring languages as "irrealis".

The "future indefinite" category is quite rare and takes the meaning of "might". The "past potential" refers to something that was just about to happen (but did not, due to an interruption) or should have happened.

The evitative category might be translated as "lest" or "or else", indicating that something undesirable might occur if something else is or is not done. For example, nga-nanggu-wa wuninggi rang-ningganjiyi means "give it to me, or else I will hit you". Note that the evitative is normally paired with another clause (as Heath says, it “does not normally stand alone as a simple prediction of impending doom”), usually in the imperative.

The past continuous durative positive, present negative/positive, future indefinite positive, future continuous durative positive, and desiderative positive all take a "durative" morpheme in the verb complex's "durative stem-initial prefix" slot; all other categories are unmarked.

The forms of these suffixes differ by auxiliary verb.

==== Pronominal prefixes ====
As in Warndarrang and other related languages, a different pronominal prefix is added to the verb for each combination of subject and object. For example, a verb with a second-person singular subject and a first-person exclusive dual object would take the prefix nirrgu- but the person-person exclusive dual subject with a third-person dual object would take the prefix nimbirr-. Within the second-person subject, third-person object paradigm, there are also different pronouns for imperative and non-imperative verbs. There are extremely complicated rules, with many exceptions, for generating these pronouns. When the third person or third person subject/third person object category is marked, the additional prefix –wa- is added to the complex.

=== Syntax ===
==== Word order ====
Within a noun phrase (NP) or verb complex, word order is almost completely fixed. Articles are followed by demonstrative pronouns are followed by the main noun are followed by adjectives, though genitive pronouns may either follow or precede the main noun. For verbs, the negative particles must immediately precede the verb complex, and within the complex the order of the morphemes is strictly set.

Within the clause, however, the order of the NPs, verb complexes, and adverbs is free. The first element is typically considered to be the most important element. If the first element is not a verb complex, the main verb complex commonly but not always assumes the second position; there appears to be no difference in meaning between those sentences that place the verb complex in the second position and those that do not.

==== Subordinated clauses ====
Subordinated clauses are typically marked by a particle or conjunction such as bigana, "because" or waninggayani, "after that". If, however, the clause can be reduced to a single verb complex, that word is typically nominalized using the suffixes –manjarr or –manggirri and then placed following the head noun.

== Avoidance terminology ==
Marra, like many languages of the area, has taboos preventing the direct interaction of siblings of the opposite sex, beginning around age eight (the age of circumcision in males). The only specific avoidance term in Marra, however, is marlayarra, used by a sister of a boy who has been circumcised to address or refer to him. In any other situation, the term for a circumcised boy is warlima.

Marra does not have the complex avoidance speech or male-female language distinction that is found in neighboring Yanyula. Men are, however, not supposed to pronounce the names of their mother-in-law (wife’s mother), their wife's mother's brother, or their wife's brother, though these taboos are relaxed as a man ages.

== Comparison of the Marran languages ==
Warndarrang (a language not spoken since 1974) and Marra (a language with only a small number of speakers) are each other’s closest relatives. Together with Alawa (also critically endangered) and Yugul (a language attested by speakers of Warndarrang, Marra, and Alawa but apparently extinct, these languages form the Marran subgroup of the Gunwinyguan language family. The three documented languages share much vocabulary and have many similar grammatical structures, though there are significant differences, and Warndarrang has been heavily influenced by loanwords from Nunggubuyu and Ngandi to the north.

=== Verbal comparison ===
All three languages are prefixing, and their verbs consist of either a single inflected stem or an uninflected "main verb" preceding an inflected auxiliary verb. Such verbal particles are absent in the languages to the north. The Marran languages also share verbal features such as particle reduplication within the verbal complex indicating a repeated or continuous action (a pattern common in Australian languages), and the negation of verbs is indicated by a particle immediately preceding the verb complex (gu in both Warndarang and Marra but ngayi in Alawa).

Marra has a significantly more complex verbal inflection system than Warndarrang (sixteen different tense/aspect/mood categories in Marra but only eight in Warndarrang and apparently seven in Alawa), an unusually intricate system for Australian languages. Both languages, however, have conjugation paradigms that are highly verb-specific.

In addition to the similarities in the order of the verb complex, Marra and Warndarrang also both use word-order to focus, or highlight, a particular item within the clause, though otherwise the word-order in Marra is far stricter than that in Warndarrang.

=== Nominal comparison ===
Alawa divides its nouns into two genders (masculine and feminine) while Marra has three classes (masculine, feminine, and neuter) and Warndarrang six. All three languages distinguish between singular, dual, and plural, with Warndarrang having an additional "paucal" (three to five) class for human nouns. The use of noun cases in Warndarrang and Marra are nearly identical – Marra condenses the allative and locative cases and adds a pergressive case – though the only cognate across the paradigm is the purposive -ni. The case marking system of Alawa is apparently not related. The demonstratives in Warndarrang and Marra cover approximately the same semantic categories (proximate, immediate, distant, and anaphoric, though Warndarrang adds an intermediate near-distant), though the forms themselves have little similarity. In fact, the Marra demonstratives inflect for case, number, and gender, while Warndarrang demonstratives engage a single basic form. Again, the Alawa demonstrative system is entirely separate, drawing only a single distance distinction ("this" versus "that") but with more nuanced anaphoric distinctions.

The directional terminology between Warndarang and Marra shares many cognates, such as garrgali (Marra) and arrgarli (Warndarrang) for "west" or guymi (both languages) for "north", though Marra again has a far more intricate and irregular morphological system to distinguish cases in these terms. Marra also has an up/down directional distinction that is absent in Warndarrang. There is no Alawa data for cardinal directions.

=== Lexical comparison ===
Cultural terminology between the three languages is distinct. Marra has an extremely complex kinship terminology system, including a large number of dyadic terms; Warndarrang’s system appeared to be much simpler, though the linguist Jeffrey Heath was unable to elicit much kinship information before his informant died. Alawa has a morphologically-irregular system similar to Marra's, but lacks the dyadic terms and shares few cognates (exceptions include baba for "older sibling"). A cursory analysis of the flora-fauna terms in the three languages also reveals few cognates. The semi-moieties in Warndarrang and Marra have nearly identical names, however, though the groups were associated with different totems, songs, and rituals.

== See also ==
- Non-Pama–Nyungan languages
- Grammatical aspect
