= Ngukurr =

- Town
- Coordinates: 13°44′00″S 134°44′00″E
- Country: Australia
- State: Northern Territory
- LGA: Roper Gulf Region
- Location: 636 km (395 mi) SE of Darwin

Government
  - Territory electorate: Arnhem
  - Federal division: Lingiari

Population
  - Total: 1,088 (SAL 2021)
- Postcode: 0852

Ngukurr (/ˈnʊkər/ NUUK-ər, Aboriginal pronunciation: [ŋʊkur]), formerly Roper River Mission (1908−1968), is a remote Aboriginal community on the banks of the Roper River in southern Arnhem Land, Northern Territory.

The community is home to various clans and language groups, with Kriol being the predominant language. The Aboriginal people collectively refer to themselves as Yugul Mangi, and the township is governed by the Yugul Mangi Development Aboriginal Corporation (YMD), representing approximately 200 people across seven clans.

Founded as the Roper River Mission in 1908, the settlement was taken over by the Northern Territory Government's Welfare Department in 1968, and handed over to the community in 1988, at which time it was renamed Ngukurr.

== History ==
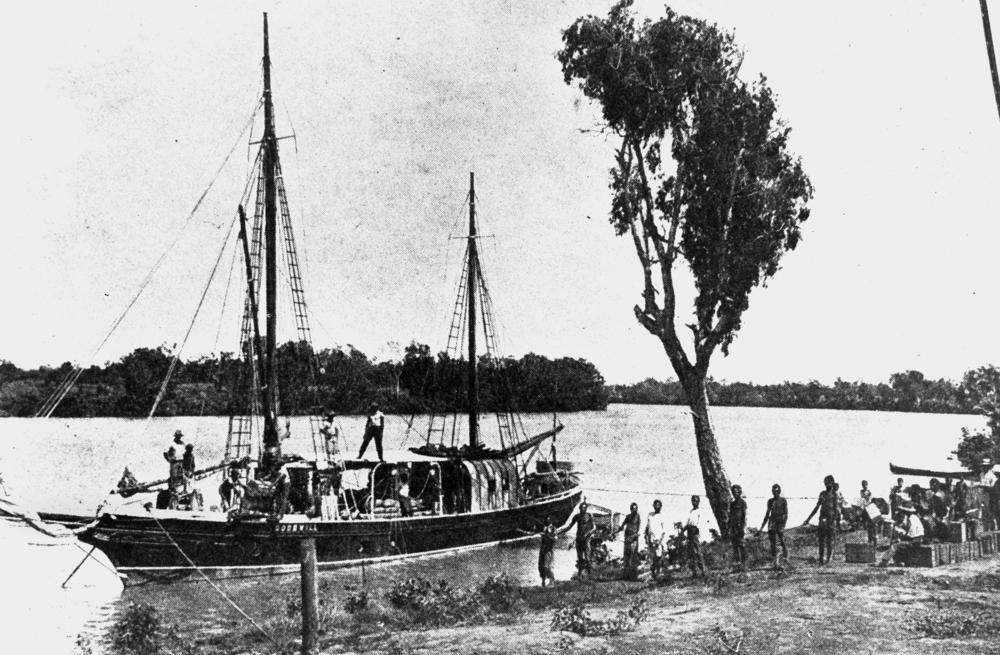
Goodwill (ship) at Roper River in 1917.

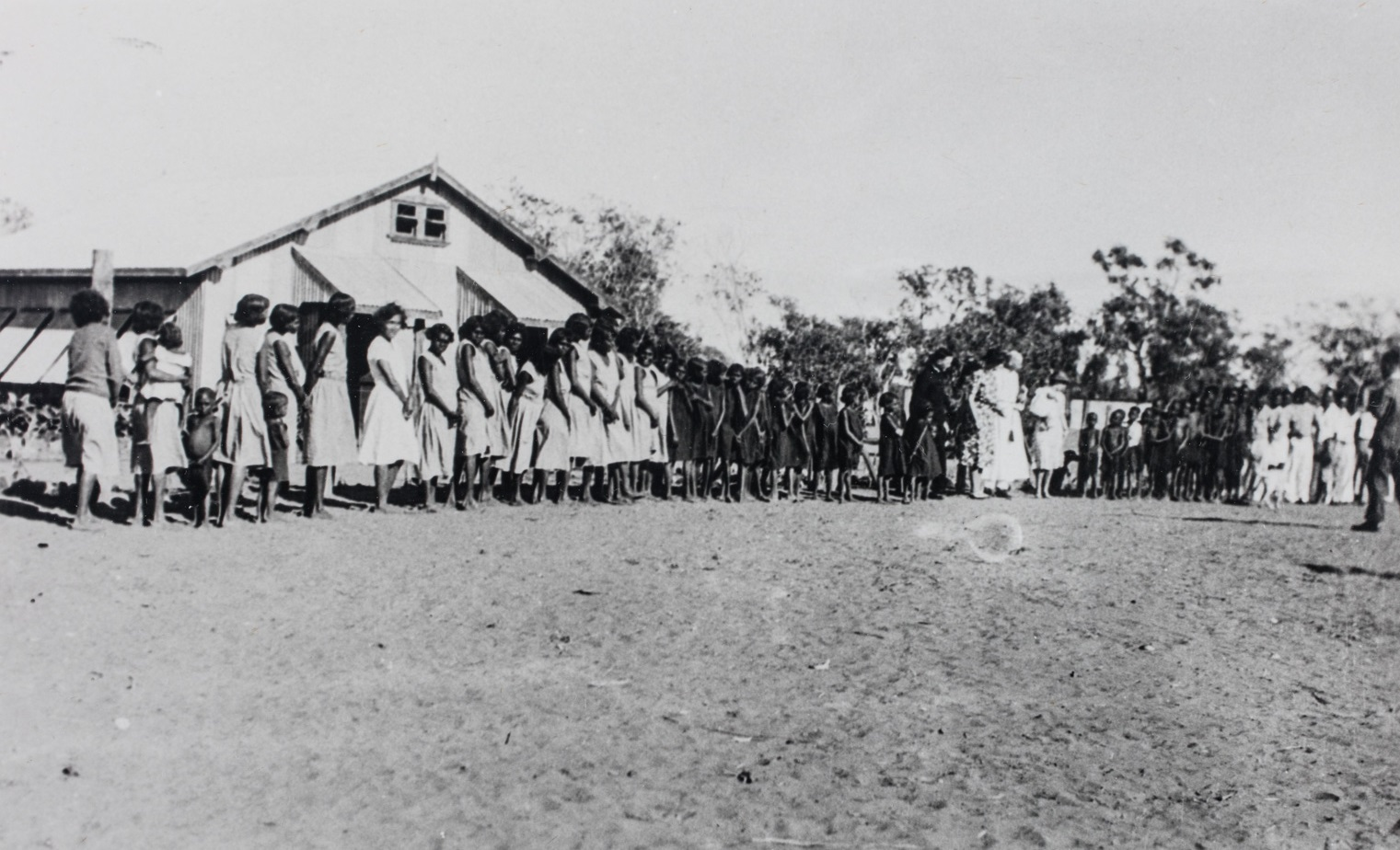
Residents outside Roper River Mission, 1938

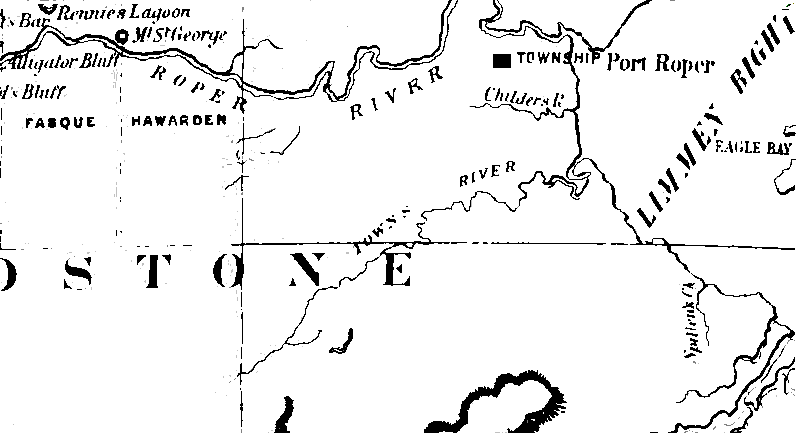
1886 map by John Sands

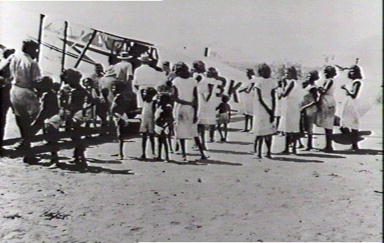
Connellan Airways at Roper River in 1948.

The town was originally settled by the Church Missionary Society in 1908, known then as the Roper River Mission. As well as bringing "Christianity and civilisation" to the local Aboriginal people, it was intended to provide a dwelling place for them, to be safe from mass killings by white settlers.

The Eastern and African Cold Storage Company had driven the people off their lands, planning to set up cattle stations and export the meat around the world. The missionaries protected them from death by starvation or massacre, but banned their languages and traditional ceremonies.

One of the Marra people, Gajiyuma, helped guide his people to the newly established mission as he believed it would protect them.

Children had to live in dormitories, while their parents and relatives lived elsewhere. A separate compound for leprosy sufferers was created in 1928. The mission moved to the present site in 1940, after a major flood destroyed the mission station.

After the Bombing of Darwin during World War II in 1942, the mission children were relocated to New South Wales, and then South Australia and Alice Springs.

The Welfare Branch of the Northern Territory Government took over management of the town in 1968.

In 1988, control of the community was handed to the Yugul Mangi Community Government Council, and the township was renamed Ngukurr. In 2008, Yugul Mangi Development Aboriginal Corporation (YMD) was established.

== Language ==
The main language spoken by Ngukurr residents is Kriol, which is spoken by 72.4% of all residents. There are a number of traditional Australian Aboriginal Languages that people of Ngukurr have as part of their heritage, including Alawa, Marra, Warndarrang, Ngandi, Ngalakgan, Nunggubuyu, Ritharrngu and Wägilak. These languages are all endangered languages. The Ngukurr Language Centre carries out various programs to support the revitalisation of the community's traditional languages. Kriol programs are supported by a local program called Meigim Kriol Strongbala. English is the primary language used in government services such as health, education and local government. Below is a table of the most common languages spoken at home in Ngukurr, as of 2016.

Language	Number	Percentage
Kriol	841	72.4%
English	85	7.3%
Djambarrpuyŋu	13	1.1%
Anindilyakwa	4	0.3%
Murrinh Patha	4	0.3%
English only	85	7.3%
Language other than English	123	73.7%

== Administration ==
Yugul Mangi Development Aboriginal Corporation (YMD) was established in 2008 after changes to the Local Government Act, which created the Roper Gulf Shire (now Roper Gulf Regional Council). YMD works closely with the Regional Council to provide services and economic opportunities in Ngukurr and surrounding areas. It represents about 300 people of the seven clans of South East Arnhem land.

== Crossing Roper Bar ==
In 2004, pianist and composer Paul Grabowsky visited Ngukurr in order to meet the traditional songmen. He met with the elders and heard two Wagilak songmen sing, and asked permission to bring his orchestra on a return visit. When he returned in 2005, he brought singer-songwriters Archie Roach and his wife Ruby Hunter, along with 10 members of his Australian Art Orchestra. After working together for five days, the musicians staged a concert in the town. The European musicians learnt about the manikay (song cycles) and were led to experiment with whole new ways of exploring sound.

The resulting project, called Crossing Roper Bar, toured the Northern Territory, played at the Birrarung Marr park in Melbourne, the National Gallery of Victoria, Apollo Bay Music Festival and the Sydney Opera House. When the group travelled to Gulkula to play at the 2006 Garma Festival, the Yolngu songmen from nearby regions were amazed, thinking that those songs had been lost long ago. In 2010 a Crossing Roper Bar album was released.

== Notable people ==
Phillip Roberts was a resident of the Roper River Mission (now Ngukurr) and his biography became an award-winning book, I, the Aboriginal, by Douglas Lockwood.

Relton Roberts, Australian rules footballer, was born and raised there, and played professionally in the Australian Football League.

Actor and musician, Tom E. Lewis, grew up in the Roper River Mission before moving into acting with his role in the film The Chant of Jimmie Blacksmith. His mother, Angelina George, also grew up in the Roper River Mission and, along with her sisters, became a renowned painter.

Dexter Daniels made significant contributions to the 1960s movement to award Aboriginal stockman equal pay, a movement that was further highlighted by the famous Wave Hill walk-off.

The Reverend Canon Michael Gumbuli Wurramara (AM) became the Northern Territory's first Indigenous Anglican priest in 1973 when he became rector of St Matthew's Anglican Church in Ngukurr.

Cherry Wulumirr Daniels received a medal of the Order of Australia in 2016 for service to her community. Her career included working as a teacher and educator, leading a local women's Indigenous ranger group and teaching her traditional language of Ngandi.

Artist and custodian of traditional law for the Wagilak people, Djambu "Sambo" Barra Barra (born c.1946) and his wife Amy Jirwulurr Johnson, also a noted artist, live at Ngukurr.

Yugul blues band was formed in 1968 in Ngukurr, and are credited as being the longest running, and the first, Aboriginal blues band in the Northern Territory.

Visual artist Ginger Riley Munduwalawala learnt to paint in Ngukurr, his work capturing the vibrancy of country.

The six-piece guitar rock band, Lonely Boys were from in Ngukurr.

== Wuyagiba and "bush uni" ==
Wuyagiba is a remote community two hours drive from Ngukurr, home to the Wuyagiba Study Hub, also known as the "bush university". Founded by Helen and Kevin Rogers four years ago, the study hub offers "two-way learning" for students who have completed year 12. This combines the teaching of academic skills needed for further study along with local culture, including bush medicine and bush tucker. Students are taught for full days, five days a week, for a term of ten weeks.

=== Climate ===
Ngukurr has a tropical semi-arid climate (Köppen: BSh), with insufficient summer precipitation to qualify as a tropical savanna climate. The town has a short wet season from December to March and a long dry season from April to November. On average, the town is quite sunny, experiencing 121.3 clear days and 73.9 cloudy days per annum. Extreme temperatures ranged from 44.5 °C (112.1 °F) on 29 October 2023 to 5.6 °C (42.1 °F) on 20 July 1965 and on 24 June 2019. The wettest recorded day was 2 January 1976 with 271.5 mm (10.69 in) of rainfall.

The Ngukurr weather station recorded climate data for temperature, precipitation, solar exposure, 9 am conditions and 3 pm conditions. It was closed in 2013.

Climate data for Ngukurr (14.73°S 134.73°E) (34 m (112 ft) AMSL) (1910-2012)
Month	Jan	Feb	Mar	Apr	May	Jun	Jul	Aug	Sep	Oct	Nov	Dec	Year
Record high °C (°F)	43.4 (110.1)	40.3 (104.5)	42.0 (107.6)	37.6 (99.7)	36.5 (97.7)	36.0 (96.8)	36.4 (97.5)	37.4 (99.3)	40.0 (104.0)	44.5 (112.1)	43.6 (110.5)	43.8 (110.8)	44.5 (112.1)
Mean daily maximum °C (°F)	35.5 (95.9)	35.0 (95.0)	34.0 (93.2)	33.9 (93.0)	31.8 (89.2)	29.9 (85.8)	29.6 (85.3)	31.9 (89.4)	34.9 (94.8)	37.5 (99.5)	38.8 (101.8)	37.7 (99.9)	34.2 (93.6)
Mean daily minimum °C (°F)	24.9 (76.8)	24.8 (76.6)	23.9 (75.0)	21.9 (71.4)	19.1 (66.4)	16.3 (61.3)	15.1 (59.2)	16.2 (61.2)	19.0 (66.2)	22.6 (72.7)	24.9 (76.8)	25.4 (77.7)	21.2 (70.1)
Record low °C (°F)	20.2 (68.4)	19.9 (67.8)	16.1 (61.0)	14.2 (57.6)	10.6 (51.1)	6.1 (43.0)	5.6 (42.1)	9.1 (48.4)	10.6 (51.1)	12.5 (54.5)	17.9 (64.2)	19.2 (66.6)	5.6 (42.1)
Average precipitation mm (inches)	182.8 (7.20)	176.5 (6.95)	174.8 (6.88)	55.9 (2.20)	10.7 (0.42)	5.1 (0.20)	1.1 (0.04)	0.7 (0.03)	1.8 (0.07)	13.5 (0.53)	42.4 (1.67)	131.6 (5.18)	815.5 (32.11)
Average precipitation days (≥ 0.2 mm)	12.0	11.4	9.8	3.7	1.1	0.5	0.3	0.2	0.3	1.2	3.9	8.9	53.3
Average afternoon relative humidity (%)	57	57	54	45	39	36	32	29	25	28	30	43	40
Average dew point °C (°F)	22.7 (72.9)	23.0 (73.4)	21.3 (70.3)	18.5 (65.3)	14.2 (57.6)	11.7 (53.1)	9.3 (48.7)	9.6 (49.3)	10.1 (50.2)	13.0 (55.4)	15.5 (59.9)	19.8 (67.6)	15.7 (60.3)
Source: Bureau of Meteorology (1910-2012)

A newer weather station at the airport was open in 2012. It records temperature, precipitation and solar exposure.

Climate data for Ngukurr Airport (14.72°S 134.75°E) (14 m (46 ft) AMSL) (2012-2025)
Month	Jan	Feb	Mar	Apr	May	Jun	Jul	Aug	Sep	Oct	Nov	Dec	Year
Record high °C (°F)	43.5 (110.3)	41.8 (107.2)	42.7 (108.9)	40.2 (104.4)	37.4 (99.3)	35.9 (96.6)	37.3 (99.1)	38.2 (100.8)	41.0 (105.8)	42.9 (109.2)	43.9 (111.0)	44.0 (111.2)	44.0 (111.2)
Mean daily maximum °C (°F)	36.9 (98.4)	36.0 (96.8)	36.1 (97.0)	35.3 (95.5)	33.0 (91.4)	31.4 (88.5)	31.1 (88.0)	33.0 (91.4)	36.4 (97.5)	39.1 (102.4)	39.7 (103.5)	38.6 (101.5)	35.6 (96.0)
Mean daily minimum °C (°F)	25.9 (78.6)	25.3 (77.5)	24.6 (76.3)	22.1 (71.8)	18.5 (65.3)	15.8 (60.4)	14.4 (57.9)	15.1 (59.2)	19.1 (66.4)	23.1 (73.6)	25.6 (78.1)	26.1 (79.0)	21.3 (70.3)
Record low °C (°F)	21.4 (70.5)	18.7 (65.7)	15.6 (60.1)	12.4 (54.3)	7.3 (45.1)	5.6 (42.1)	5.8 (42.4)	6.8 (44.2)	9.2 (48.6)	15.2 (59.4)	17.9 (64.2)	20.0 (68.0)	5.6 (42.1)
Average precipitation mm (inches)	168.0 (6.61)	169.1 (6.66)	154.5 (6.08)	41.2 (1.62)	8.5 (0.33)	0.5 (0.02)	0.5 (0.02)	0.1 (0.00)	5.3 (0.21)	17.6 (0.69)	60.3 (2.37)	127.7 (5.03)	741.0 (29.17)
Average precipitation days (≥ 0.2 mm)	16.2	12.6	11.8	4.4	1.8	0.5	0.7	0.4	0.4	2.0	5.6	10.4	66.8
Source: Bureau of Meteorology (2012-2025)
