= Ngandi =

Indigenous Australian people

The Ngandi were an indigenous Australian people of the Northern Territory. The Ngandji are another tribe, and the two are not to be confused.

== Country ==
The Ngandi's lands, some 1,500 square miles (3,900 km^{2}) in extent, encompassed the area around the upper Wilton River, Mainoru River. Their eastern boundary was close to the sources of the Rose River.

== Alternative names ==
- N'gundi
- Ngalbon, Ngalgbun
- Nandi

== Notable people ==
The Australian ethnographer Norman Tindale was accompanied on his first fieldwork in 1921-1922 among the Groote Eylandt Ingura by a Ngandi tribal songmaker and trader, Maroadunei by name but known as 'Tim,' who acted as Tindale's interpreter, helper and handyman.

Tim, the white man's name he liked to be called, had been for many years a carrier of trade parcels of unifacially flaked quartzite blades of leilira type, used as spearheads and knives, from the stone mines east of the Katherine River in southern Arnhem Land. For half of his adult life he had traveled through much of eastern Arnhem Land, keeping south of the border of the spread of the rite of circumcision, singing and dreaming up new songs for ceremonies, and on occasion introducing new drone-pipe rhythms to the people of the several tribes among whom he was a welcome guest. These songs and his neatly wrapped trade parcels were his passport to visit distant tribes and to see places denied to most tribesmen.

== Sources ==
- Tindale, Norman Barnett (1974). "Ngandi (NT)". Aboriginal Tribes of Australia: Their Terrain, Environmental Controls, Distribution, Limits, and Proper Names. Australian National University Press. ISBN 978-0-708-10741-6.
