= Alawa language =

Australian Aboriginal language

Alawa
- Native to: Australia
- Region: Northern Territory; Arnhem Land, Roper River.
- Ethnicity: Alawa
- Native speakers: 5 (2021 census)
- Language family: Macro-Pama-Nyungan?: Macro-Gunwinyguan; Marran?; Alawa

Language codes
- ISO 639-3: alh
- Glottolog: alaw1244
- AIATSIS: N92
- ELP: Alawa
- Alawa is classified as Critically Endangered by the UNESCO Atlas of the World's Languages in Danger.

Alawa (Galawa) is a moribund Indigenous Australian language spoken by the Alawa people of the Northern Territory. In 1991, there were reportedly 18 remaining speakers and 4 semi-speakers; by 2021, the number of people speaking it at home had dropped to 5.

== History ==
By 1972, younger Alawa people had switched to a language they called Pidgin English used in "many conversations", only speaking Alawa with elders. The 2021 Australian census reported five speakers of Alawa.

=== Documentation ===
Prior to 1972, when Alawa Phonology and Grammar by Margaret Sharpe was published, very little had been documented of Alawa. Arthur Capell published a description of phonological and grammatical aspects of Alawa in 1942. The book I, the Aboriginal also contains words in Alawa.

== Phonology ==
=== Consonants ===
Alawa has a typical consonant inventory for an Indigenous Australian language, with five contrastive places of articulation, multiple lateral consonants, and no voicing contrast among the stops.

Consonant phonemes
	Alveolar		Palatal	Peripheral	
	Alveolar	Retroflex	Alveo-palatal	Velar	Bilabial
Prenasalised Stop	ⁿd	ⁿɖ	ⁿd̠ʲ	ᵑɡ	ᵐb
Devoiced Stop	t	ʈ	t̠ʲ	k	p
Nasals	n	ɳ	n̠ʲ	ŋ	m
Laterals	l	ɭ	l̠ʲ		
Vibrants	r				
Glide	ɹ		j	w	

Prenasalized stops are interpreted by Sharpe as being perceived by native Alawa speakers as a single unit, even though "the level at which [prenasalized stops] are regarded as two segments is significant". The vibrant phoneme /r/ is mostly articulated as a trill at the end of a word. Sometimes, /ɹ/ is only barely voiced, in which case it may sound as though it were an allophone of /r/.

=== Vowels ===
The vowel system of Alawa is made up of four vowel phonemes: the high front vowel /i/, the high back vowel /u/, the mid front vowel /e/, and the low central vowel /a/.

Vowel phonemes
	Front	Central	Back
High	i		u
Mid	e		
Low		a	

There are no rounding contrasts or length contrasts in Alawa.

== Vocabulary ==
Capell (1942) lists the following basic vocabulary items in Alawa:

gloss	Alawa
man	lilmi
woman	girija
head	guɽuguɽu
eye	gulur
nose	gujumur
mouth	ŋaːndal
tongue	djeːjälŋ
stomach	gundjäl
bone	galawa
blood	ŋulidji
kangaroo	girimbọ
opossum	gudjaɳi
emu	djinaliri
crow	waŋgunaji
fly	wuɳɖil
sun	marawaɭbaɭ
moon	aɖaŋari
fire	wubu
smoke	guŋuŋu
water	ŋọgọ

=== See also ===
- Wightman, Glenn Mitchell (1991), Alawa ethnobotany: Aboriginal plant use from Minyerri, northern Australia, vol. 11, Conservation Commission of the Northern Territory, Wikidata Q109466390
