= Roper River =

River in Northern Territory, Australia

Roper
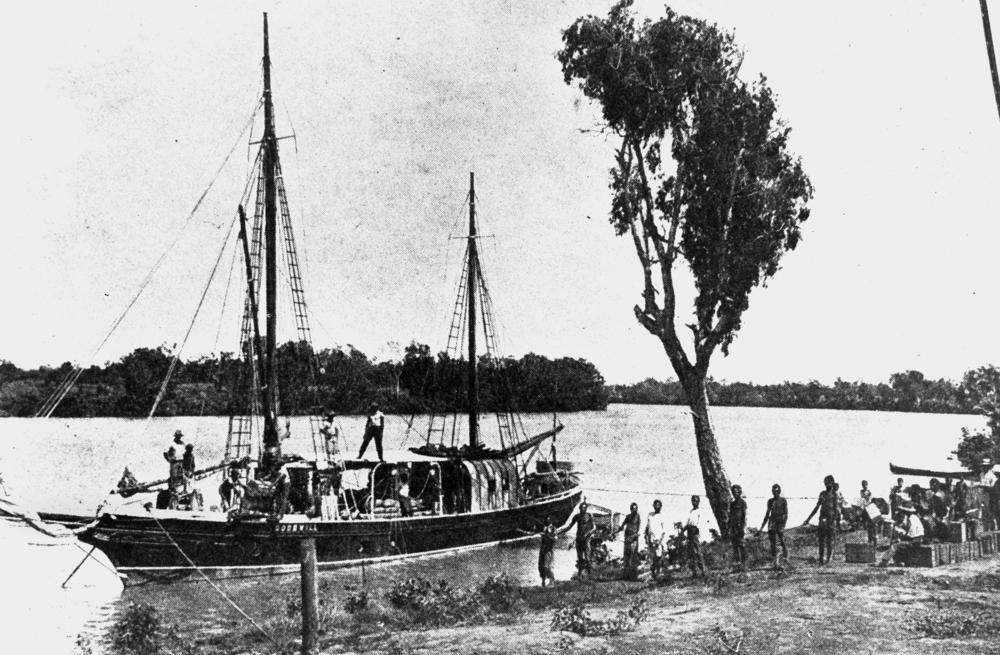
- Goodwill on the Roper River

- Location of the Roper River mouth in the Northern Territory
- Native name: Ropa Riba (Australian Kriol)

Location
- Country: Australia
- Territory: Northern Territory

Physical characteristics
- Source confluence: Waterhouse River and Roper Creek
  - location: east of Mataranka
  - coordinates: 14°55′58″S 133°08′59″E
  - elevation: 126 m (413 ft)
- Mouth: Limmen Bight
  - location: Gulf of Carpentaria
  - coordinates: 14°42′40″S 135°19′42″E
  - elevation: 0 m (0 ft)
- Length: 400 km (250 mi)
- Basin size: 81,794 km^{2} (31,581 mi^{2})
- Discharge
  - location: Limmen Bight (near mouth)
  - average: 5,540,000 ML/a (176 m^{3}/s) to (Period: 1971–2000)296.9 m^{3}/s (10,480 cu ft/s)
- Discharge
  - location: Ngukurr (105 rkm; Basin size: 69,553.2 km^{2} (26,854.6 sq mi)
  - average: (Period: 1971–2000)253.5 m^{3}/s (8,950 cu ft/s)
- Discharge
  - location: Red Rock (161 rkm; Basin size: 47,400 km^{2} (18,300 sq mi)
  - average: (Period: 1966–1999)88.8 m^{3}/s (3,140 cu ft/s) to (Period: 1971–2000)106 m^{3}/s (3,700 cu ft/s)
  - minimum: 0 m^{3}/s (0 cu ft/s)
  - maximum: 1,395 m^{3}/s (49,300 cu ft/s)
- Discharge
  - location: Mataranka (Confluence of Waterhouse River and Roper Creek, 400 rkm; Basin size: 5,950.6 km^{2} (2,297.5 sq mi)
  - average: (Period: 1961–1999)20.5 m^{3}/s (720 cu ft/s) to (Period: 1971–2000)22.2 m^{3}/s (780 cu ft/s)
  - minimum: 0.7 m^{3}/s (25 cu ft/s)
  - maximum: 182.5 m^{3}/s (6,440 cu ft/s)

Basin features
- River system: Roper River
- Tributaries
  - left: Waterhouse, Chambers, Maiwok Creek, Flying Fox Creek, Jalboi, Wilton, Phelp
  - right: Roper Creek, Elsey Creek, Strandways, Hodgson, Mountain Creek
- National park: Elsey National Park

The Roper River in 1946

The Roper River (Australian Kriol: Ropa Riba) is a large perennial river in the Katherine region of the Northern Territory of Australia.

== Location and features ==
Formed by the confluence of the Waterhouse River and Roper Creek, the Roper River rises east of Mataranka in the Elsey National Park and flows generally east for over 400 km (250 mi) to meet the sea in Limmen Bight on the Gulf of Carpentaria. The river is joined by fifteen tributaries, including the Chambers, Strangways, Jalboi, Hodgson and the Wilton Rivers. The river descends 126 m (413 ft) over its 400 km (250 mi) course and has a catchment area of 81,794 km^{2} (31,581 mi^{2}), which is one of the largest river catchment areas in the Northern Territory. The Roper River is navigable for about 145 kilometres (90 mi), until the tidal limit at Roper Bar, and forms the southern boundary of the region known as Arnhem Land. Mataranka Hot Springs and the township of Mataranka lie close to the river at its western end. Port Roper lies near its mouth on Limmen Bight.

The river has a mean annual outflow of 5.54 km^{3}/a (176 m^{3}/s). It is one of only few major rivers in the Northern Territory that flows all year round sustained by groundwater.

Annual flooding is essential for the health of its nationally significant coastal wetlands and seagrass beds of Limmen Bight, that are habitat for turtles and dugongs, as well as the barramundi, prawns and crabs that are fished recreationally and commercially.

== History ==
The traditional owners of the Roper River are the Ngalakgan, Alawa, Mangarrayi, Ngandi, Marra, Warndarrang, Nunggubuyu, Ritharrngu-Wagilak and Rembarrnga peoples.

The first European to explore the Roper River was Ludwig Leichhardt in 1845 as he made his way from Moreton Bay to Port Essington. Leichhardt crossed the river at Roper Bar, a rocky shelf which conveniently lies at the high tide limit on the river. He named the river after John Roper, a member of the expedition stating: "I found myself on the banks of a large fresh water river from 500 to 800 yards broad, with not very high banks... it was the river Mr Roper has seen two days before, and I named it after him, as I had promised to do."

== Tributaries ==
The largest tributaries of the Roper River:

Left tributary	Right tributary	Length (km)	Basin size (km^{2})	Average discharge (m^{3}/s)
Roper		400^{*}	81,794	296.9
Phelp		123	5,305	40
	Mountain Creek		633.6	3.65
	Hodgson	230	14,109	89.6
Wilton		225	12,694	85
Jalboi		90	2,271	8.6
Flying Fox Creek		178	3,037	12
Maiwok Creek		167	2,770	10.2
	Strangways	185	6,142	18
Chambers		70	1,051	4.1
	Elsey Creek		21,210	23.8
Waterhouse		199	3,649	14.8
	Roper Creek	110	2,108.7	7.4

^{*}Roper River (400 km (250 mi) with Waterhouse River (199 km (124 mi) is 599 km (372 mi) long; Roper River with the Roper Creek (110 km (68 mi) is 510 km (320 mi) long;

== Roper River Mission ==
The Roper River Mission was established by the Church of England Missionary Society in 1908. After it was closed in 1968, the government took over management of the community. In 1988, control of the town was handed to the Yugul Mangi Community Government Council, and the township was renamed Ngukurr.

== See also ==
- List of rivers of Australia § Northern Territory
