= Kolorbidahdah =

- Town
- Interactive map of Kolorbidahdah
- Coordinates: 12°33′33.40″S 134°14′14.28″E
- Country: Australia
- State: Northern Territory
- Region: Arnhem Land
- LGA: West Arnhem Regional Council
- Location: 491 km (305 mi) from Darwin; 81.3 km (50.5 mi) from Maningrida

Government
  - Territory electorate: Arafura
  - Federal division: Lingiari
- Time zone: UTC+9:30 (ACST)

Kolorbidahdah is a remote Aboriginal community located in West Arnhem Land, in the Northern Territory of Australia. It lies approximately 81 kilometres from Maningrida and around 8 hours' drive from Darwin. It is part of the local government area of West Arnhem Regional Council and is within the Djelk Indigenous Protected Area.

== Culture ==
=== Bininj identity ===
Kolorbidahdah is part of the cultural region of the Bininj people of western Arnhem Land. The term Bininj, from the Bininj Kunwok languages, broadly means “Aboriginal person” or “man” in contrast to non-Aboriginal people who are often referred to as "Balanda". Bininj groups are often identified through the languages and dialects they speak including Kuninjku, Kune, Kundjeyhmi and others.

=== Languages ===
Language remains central to everyday life in Kolorbidahdah and many residents are multilingual. The primary language spoken is Kune. Other regional languages such as Dalabon, Rembarrnga and Kuninjku are also spoken.

== Aliases ==
Kolorbidahdah is the most common spelling for the community. Other recorded spellings include Kolobidadah, Korlorbidahdah, Korrlorbirrahda, Korlobirrahda, Korlobidahdah and Kolobidada.

== Notable people ==
=== Musicians ===
- Wildfire Manwurrk is a National Indigenous Music Awards-winning Indigenous rock band from Kolorbidahdah to play in their traditional languages of Kune, Rembarrnga and Dalabon.
- Tara Rostron is a singer, songwriter and bass guitarist for Ripple Effect Band, an all-women group based in Maningrida. The band sings in several languages of Maningrida including Ndjébbana, Kune, Burarra, Kuninjku and Na-kara languages.

=== Models ===
- Cindy Rostron is a model, social media influencer and Djelk ranger who won the Cecilia Cubillo Young Achiever Award at the National Indigenous Fashion Awards. She has appeared on the front page of several modelling publications including Vogue magazine.

=== Artists ===
- Kune, Dalabon and Rembarrnga woman Jay Jurrupula Rostron is a renowned artist, printmaker and painter. She won the Textile Design award at the 2024 National Indigenous Fashion Awards.
