= Gurr-Goni =

Indigenous Australian people of the Northern Territory

The Gungorogone are an indigenous Australian people of the Northern Territory.

== Name ==
The tribal autonym is formed by an apparent suffix gurr- and -goni, their word for 'this'.

== Language ==
Guragone is a non-Pama-Nyungan language belonging to the Gunwinyguan family of languages, and has been described by Rebecca Green. It is one of the four Maningrida languages, the others being Ndjebbana, Nakkara and Burarra. Despite their genetic similarity, shared vocabulary rates are low, with 22% between Gurr-goni and Ndjebbana, and 24% between Gurr-goni and Nakkara. It has two dialects, associated with the two moieties, respectively gun-dakangurrngu Gurrgoni, or 'hard Gurr-goni' and gunnjalkitj or 'soft' Gurrgoni.

== Country ==
The Gungorogone were inlanders living south of Maningrida, who dwelt in the area to the southeast of the headwaters of the Tomkinson River, on and to the west of the Cadell River.

Neighbouring tribes were the Dangkolo and Manengkererrbe clans to their west, Gunavidji and Nakkara on their northern frontier. Running clockwise, the Burarra and Gun-nartpa, Ngulinj clan, and finally, the Kardbam clan on their southern flank.

== Social organization ==
The Gungorogone were composed of 5 clans in recent memory:

- The Boburerre (Yirrtjinga dialect)
- The Andirrdjalaba (Yirrtjinga dialect)
- The Gulumarrarra (Djowunga dialect)

Extinct clans:

- The Atbimingi (Djowunga dialect)
- The Marrarditj (Yirrtjinga dialect)

In terms of social structure, they comprise two moieties, differentiated linguistically by distinct dialects:

- The Yirrtjinga moiety
- The Djowunga moiety

== Alternative names ==
- Gungoragone
- Gungoro:lgo:ngi
- Gungarawoni
- Gungurulgungi

== Sources ==
- Capell, Arthur (June 1942). "Languages of Arnhem Land, North Australia". Oceania. 12 (4): 364–392. doi:10.1002/j.1834-4461.1942.tb00365.x. JSTOR 40327959.
- Elkin, A. P.; Berndt, R. M.; Berndt, C. H. (June 1951). "Social Organization of Arnhem Land". Oceania. 21 (4): 253–301. doi:10.1002/j.1834-4461.1951.tb00176.x. JSTOR 40328302.
- Green, Rebecca (1995). A grammar of Gurr-goni (North Central Arnhem land) (PDF). ANU doctoral thesis.
- Tindale, Norman Barnett (1974). "Gungorogone (NT)". Aboriginal Tribes of Australia: Their Terrain, Environmental Controls, Distribution, Limits, and Proper Names. Australian National University. ISBN 978-0-708-10741-6. Archived from the original on 20 March 2020.
