= Kune dialect =

Australian Aboriginal language

Kune
- Native to: Australia
- Region: Northern Territory
- Ethnicity: Bininj
- Native speakers: 257 (2021 census)
- Language family: Arnhem: Gunwinyguan; Gunwinggic; Bininj Kunwok; Kune

Language codes
- ISO 639-3: –
- Glottolog: gune1238
- AIATSIS: N70 Kune

Kune is a dialect of Bininj Kunwok, an Australian Aboriginal language. The Aboriginal people who speak Kune are the Bininj people, who live primarily in western Arnhem Land. Kune is spoken primarily in the south-east of the Bininj Kunwok speaking areas, particularly in the Cadell River district south of Maningrida. Grammatically Kune is closely related to other varieties of Bininj Kunwok, although it differs in vocabulary. According to the 2021 Australian Census, Kune was spoken by approximately 257 people.

== Geographic distribution ==
Kune is spoken in western Arnhem Land in the Northern Territory of Australia primarily in the south-eastern part of the Bininj Kunwok dialect area. Its main stronghold is the Cadell River district, south of Maningrida including outstations such as Kolorbidahdah, Buluhkaduru and Bolkdjam.

Speakers of Kune are part of the Bininj people of western Arnhem Land. Many speakers move between outstations and the township of Maningrida, and the dialect continues to be used in everyday communication, often alongside English and Kriol.

== Grammar ==
=== Pronouns ===
English	Personal	Possessive	Person
I, me	ngaye	ngardduk	First-person
I + you	ngarrku	ngarrku	First-person
We (two of us, but not you)	ngarrewoneng	ngarrewoneng	First-person
We (three of us, including you)	karrewoneng	karrewoneng	First-person
We (all of us, including you)	kadberre	kadberre	First-person
We (all of us, excluding you)	ngad	ngadberre	First-person
You	ngudda	ke	Second-person
You two	ngurrewoneng	ngurrewoneng	Second-person
You all	ngudberre	ngudberre	Second-person
He, him	nungka	nuye	Third person
She, her	ngaleng	ngarre / ngalengarre	Third person
They (2+)	berrewoneng	berrewoneng	Third person
They	bedda	bedberre	Third person

== Notable people ==
=== Musicians ===
- Wildfire Manwurrk is a National Indigenous Music Awards-winning rock band from Kolorbidahdah. The group performs songs in several traditional languages including Kune, Rembarrnga and Dalabon.
- Ripple Effect Band is an all-women rock band based in Maningrida. The band performs in multiple Maningrida languages including Ndjébbana, Kune, Burarra, Kuninjku and Na-kara.

=== Media ===
- Looking after Yaimini (Australia, 1986) is a documentary film portraying the life of a Kune-speaking family living at Yaimini outstation in central Arnhem Land. The film follows an extended family led by a senior elder and explores themes such as connection to land, cultural practices, kinship, and everyday life in an outstation (homelands) setting.
