= Cindy Rostron =

Australian model (born 2005)

- Born: 2005 (age 20–21)
- Occupations: Model; ranger
- Years active: 2021–present

Cindy Rostron (born 2005) is an Australian model, actress and Indigenous ranger. Rostron has modelled for the cover of Vogue Australia and in various shows at Australian Fashion Week.

== Early life ==
Rostron is a Kune, Dalabon, and Rembarrnga woman, with the skin name Bangardidjan/Bangin. She grew up in Kolorbidahdah, an outstation near Maningrida, a small community in West Arnhem Land in the Northern Territory of Australia. She attended school in Maningrida. Her mother, Jay Jurrupula Rostron, is Baraba from Banam-banamdih, and works as a textile artist at Bàbbarra Designs, part of Bàbbarra Women's Centre. Rostron's mother has designed some of the clothes that Rostron has modelled. Rostron's father, Victor Rostron, is Bununggu from Buluh Kaduru and is a ranger. Growing up, Rostron admired her father's work and wanted to become a ranger herself. Her father, her four brothers, and her cousin are part of a band called Wildfire Manwurrk.

Rostron is multilingual, speaking English, Kune and Rembarrnga.

Rostron initially gained a following on Instagram and TikTok by posting short dances and videos of her daily life. She later decided to use her platform to increase representation of Indigenous Australians.

== Modelling career ==
Rostron modelled for the first time by taking part in a fashion parade at the Barunga Festival in 2021, alongside her sister, Tara Rostron. In the parade, she modelled for Bàbbarra Designs. Later in 2021, she modelled for the We Wear Australian campaign by Showroom X.

Rostron was first noticed by Vogue while she was doing a photoshoot in Broome and Kununarra, in the Kimberley region of Western Australia.

In 2022, Rostron modelled for photographer Renae Saxby for a photographic portrait titled Bangardidjan, which is also Rostron's skin name. Saxby's portrait of Rostron won the National Photographic Portrait Prize Highly Commended award in 2023.

Rostron appeared on the cover of Vogue Australia in the May 2022 issue, alongside three other Indigenous models; Charlee Fraser, Magnolia Maymuru, and Elaine George, who was the first Indigenous Australian model to be featured on the cover of Vogue. Rostron was also featured in the Vogue Australia September 2023 issue.

Rostron has participated in the Country to Couture showcase each year from 2023 to 2026. The showcase presents the creations of Indigenous fashion designers and textile artists, including Rostron's mother, with the designs being presented by Indigenous models. In 2025, Rostron modelled at the showcase for Bula'bula Arts' and Black Cat Couture NT's joint project.

She has also participated in Australian Fashion Week several times, beginning in 2022. In 2023, Rostron modelled in nine shows. In 2025, Rostron modelled again at Australian Fashion Week, working with fashion designer Ngali.

At the National Indigenous Fashion Awards in 2025, Rostron won the Cecilia Cubillo Young Achiever Award.

In 2026, Rostron participated in a collaboration between Bàbbarra Designs and Tharangini Studio, a design studio in Bengaluru, India. The partnership won the Community Collaboration award at the 2026 National Indigenous Fashion Awards. Rostron said this collaboration held cultural significance to her, as her paternal grandfather is Indian. In the same year, Rostron was involved in a NAIDOC Week art exhibition for Lismore Regional Gallery, titled Deadly Weavers.

== Other ventures ==
In 2022, Rostron was involved in the Strong Women for Healthy Country Network, attending and documenting the forum held in Eastern Arrente Country. She attended again in 2023.

Rostron additionally has a career as a Djelk ranger, performing land management to maintain the environment and care for Country. The Djelk rangers are also known as the Bawinanga rangers, and they operate around the Djelk Indigenous Protected Area. She first joined the "Learning On Country" ranger training program at her school in 2020. She also uses TikTok and Instagram as part of her work to represent her community.

In 2026, Rostron starred in Maŋutji (Catching Eyes), a romantic comedy short film shot in Yirrkala, Arnhem Land. The film focuses on two teenage football players falling in love while navigating cultural boundaries. The film's dialogue is in Yolngu-Matha, an Indigenous language of Arnhem Land which Rostron did not know how to speak until working on the film. According to director Sienna Stubbs, Rostron was able to learn the language in around three days.
