= Burarra people =

Indigenous Australian people from near Maningrida in the Northern Territory

The Burarra people, also referred to as the Gidjingali, are an Aboriginal Australian people in and around Maningrida, in the heart of Arnhem Land in the Northern Territory. Opinions have differed as to whether the two names represent different tribal realities, with the Gidjingali treated as the same as, or as a subgroup of the Burarra, or as an independent tribal grouping. For the purposes of this encyclopedia, the two are registered differently, though the ethnographic materials on both may overlap with each other.

According to Norman Tindale, there are five sub-groups of Burarra people: Anbara (or Anbarra), Marawuraba, Madia, Maringa and Gunadba. The Burraras' closest neighbours are the Dangbon/Dalabon, Nakara and Yolngu peoples.

== Name ==
The ethnonym Burarra means 'those people'. Norman Tindale classified the Gidjingali as being eastern Burarra, speaking a dialect only slightly different from Burarra. Les Hiatt argued in 1965 that they were a distinct "tribe". Others take Hiatt's Gidjingali to be essentially synonymous with Burarra, and the words are used now interchangeably. Tindale considered Burarra to be an exonym applied to them by outsiders, and speculated that their "real" name might be Ngapanga.

== Language ==
Burarra is a prefixing Arnhem land language belonging to the Maningrida family of non-Pama-Nyungan languages. Bururra is spoken by approximately 2,000 people, many of them multilingual.

== Country ==
Burarra traditional land covers some 200 square miles (520 km^{2}) on both banks of the Blyth River, for a distance of roughly 20 miles inland. Their eastward extension runs as far as and east to Cape Stewart. Facing the Arafura Sea, their territory also extends to some islands, (Note: This was formerly denied by Tindale, who wrote:'They did not possess coastal resources.' (Tindale 1974, p. 221)) opposite those of their northern maritime neighbours, the Yan-nhaŋu of the Crocodile Islands. Despite speaking markedly different languages – one prefixing, the other suffixing – the Burarra and the Yan-nhaŋu have strong sociocultural links.

Their land adjoins that of the Dangbon (or Dalabon), Nakara (Nagara) and Yolngu peoples.

== Social organisation ==
Though neighbours of such Yolngu peoples as the Djinang, Burarra marriage practices are markedly at odds with those of the Yolngu. Ian Keen has said that there are five major differences:

- (a) Yolngu men are more polygamous than their Burarra peers;
- (b) while the Yolngu have a Karadjeri system of kin classification, the Burarra's resembles that of the Aranda;
- (c) the rules governing spousal choice are at odds, as are their respective expectations about how flexible older men should be in ceding rights over women to younger men;
- (d) Land-owning groups are structured somewhat differently; and
- (e) Whereas for the Burarra the named community forms the basic unit for certain types of political action, the Yolngu organise such activities on a clan basis (occasionally with another clan).

=== Clans and moieties ===
The Burarra, according to Tindale, consist of five subgroups:

1. Anbara (western bank of the mouth of the Blyth River)
2. Marawuraba (from the coast to the east of Blyth River)
3. Madia (Cape Stewart area)
4. Maringa
5. Gunadba (Gunaidbe)

Each of the five have a Yirritja/Dua moiety division.

== Alternative names ==
- Barera
- Baurera
- Burada
- Burara
- Burarra
- Burera
- Gidjingali

Source: Tindale 1974, p. 222

== Modern period ==
Questacon, Australia's national science and technology centre in Canberra, has produced a website about the "people, land, language and traditional technologies of the Burarra people", called Burarra Gathering.

== Some words ==
- gurakadj (shame/fear)

== See also ==
- Australian Aboriginal culture § Examples of ceremonies for description of the rom ceremony practised by the Anbarra people

== Sources ==
- Bagshaw, Geoffrey (2014). "Gapu Dhulkway, Gapu Maramba: conceptualisation and ownership of saltwater among the Burarra and Yan-nhangu peoples of northeast Arnhem Land". In Peterson, Nicolas; Rigsby, Bruce (eds.). Customary marine tenure in Australia. Sydney University Press. pp. 247–284. ISBN 978-1-743-32389-2.
- "Burarra people and their land". Questacon - The National Science and Technology Centre. 20 September 2013.
- Keen, Ian (December 1982). "How Some Murngin Men Marry Ten Wives: The Marital Implications of Matrilateral Cross-Cousin Structures". Man. New Series. 17 (4): 620–642. doi:10.2307/2802037. JSTOR 2802037.
- Tindale, Norman Barnett (1974). "Barara (NT)". Aboriginal Tribes of Australia: Their Terrain, Environmental Controls, Distribution, Limits, and Proper Names. Australian National University. ISBN 978-0-708-10741-6. Archived from the original on 20 March 2020.
- Vaughen, Jill (2018). Singer, Ruth; Vaughen, Jill (eds.). ""We talk in saltwater words": Dimensionalisation of dialectal variation in multilingual Arnhem Land". Language & Communication. 62: 119–132. doi:10.1016/j.langcom.2017.10.002. S2CID 150153425.
- "Welcome to Burarra Gathering". Questacon. 2017.
- Wierzbicka, Anna (1999). Emotions Across Languages and Cultures: Diversity and Universals. Cambridge University Press. ISBN 978-0-521-59971-9.
