= Gadjalivia =

The Gadjalivia were an indigenous Australian people of Arnhem Land in the Northern Territory. They are now regarded as extinct.

== Language ==
Arthur Capell classified the Gadjalivia language (Gudjälavia) as a dialect of Burarra.

== Country ==
Norman Tindale estimated that their lands encompassed some 200 square miles (520 km^{2}), inland to the west of the Blyth River.

== History ==
Following a drastic reduction in their numbers, remnants of the tribe, surviving around the Cadell River, are said to have been assimilated into the Nagara.

== Alternative names ==
- Gajalivia
- Gudjalibi
- Gudalavia
- Gudjaliba
- Gadjalibi
- Gadjalibir

== Sources ==
- Berndt, Ronald Murray; Berndt, Catherine Helen (1951). Sexual behaviour in Western Arnhem Land. Viking Fund Publications in Anthropology. Johnson Reprint Corporation, New Haven.
- Capell, A. (June 1942). "Languages of Arnhem Land, North Australia". Oceania. 12 (4): 364–392. doi:10.1002/j.1834-4461.1942.tb00365.x. JSTOR 40327959.
- Keen, Ian (December 1982). "How Some Murngin Men Marry Ten Wives: The Marital Implications of Matrilateral Cross-Cousin Structures". Man. New Series. 17 (4): 620–642. doi:10.2307/2802037. JSTOR 2802037.
- Tindale, Norman Barnett (1974). "Gadjalivia (NT)". Aboriginal Tribes of Australia: Their Terrain, Environmental Controls, Distribution, Limits, and Proper Names. Australian National University. ISBN 978-0-708-10741-6. Archived from the original on 20 March 2020.
