= Burarra =

Burarra may refer to:

- Burarra people, an ethnic group of Australia
- Burarra language, an Australian language

== See also ==
- Burara, a genus of butterflies
