= Gurr-Goni language =

Australian Aboriginal language

Guragone
- Gungurugoni
- Region: Northern Territory
- Ethnicity: Gungurugoni
- Native speakers: 40 (2021 census)
- Language family: Macro-Gunwinyguan: Maningrida; Guragone

Language codes
- ISO 639-3: gge
- Glottolog: gura1252
- AIATSIS: N75
- ELP: Gurr-goni
- Gurrgoni is classified as Vulnerable by the UNESCO Atlas of the World's Languages in Danger.

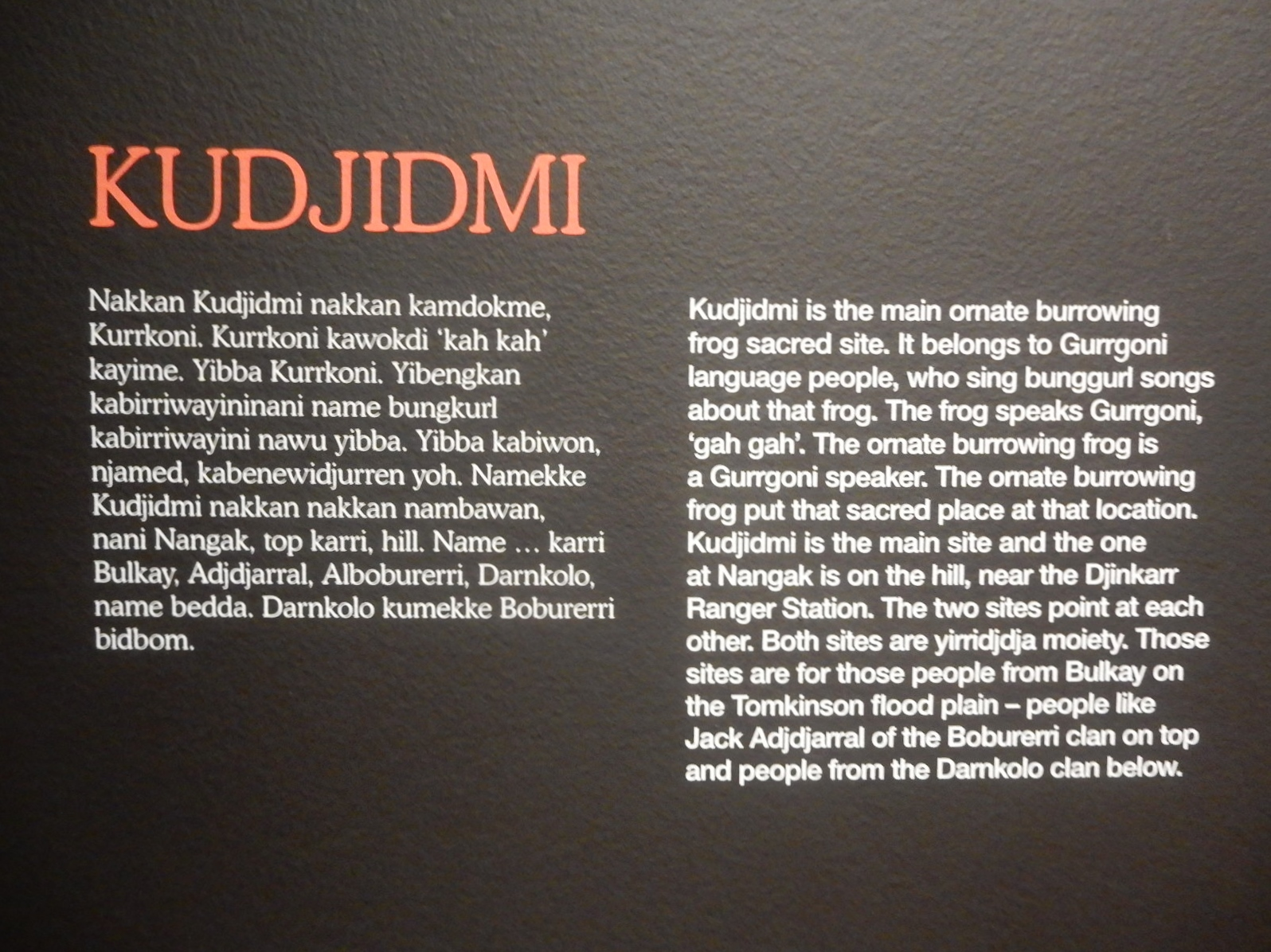

Gurr-goni, also spelled Guragone, Gorogone, Gun-Guragone, Gunagoragone, Gungorogone, Gurrogone, Gutjertabia, is an Australian Aboriginal language spoken in Arnhem Land. There were about 60 speakers in 2011, all trilingual in Burarra or Kuninjku.

== Phonology ==
=== Vowels ===
	Front	Back
Close	i	u
Mid	ɛ	o
Open	a	
