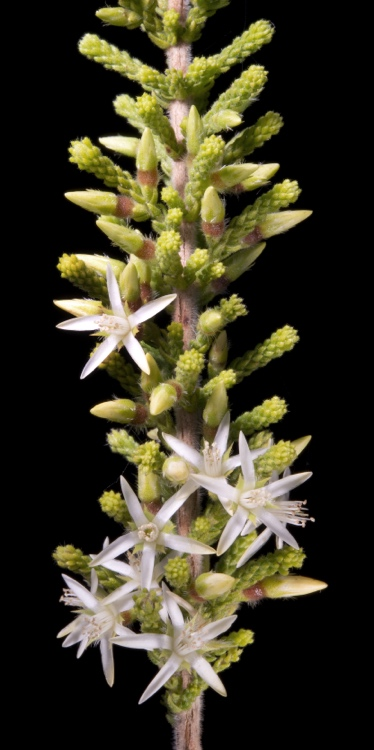
- On the Mitchell Plateau

Conservation status
- Data Deficient (IUCN 3.1)

Scientific classification
- Kingdom: Plantae
- Clade: Tracheophytes
- Clade: Angiosperms
- Clade: Eudicots
- Clade: Rosids
- Order: Myrtales
- Family: Myrtaceae
- Genus: Calytrix
- Species: C. achaeta

Binomial name
- Calytrix achaeta (F.Muell.) Benth.

Synonyms
- Calycothrix achaeta F.Muell.; Calythrix achaeta Benth. orth. var.; Calythrix cuspidata Druce nom. inval., nom. nud.; Lhotskya cuspidata F.Muell. nom. inval., nom. nud.; Lhotzkya cuspidata F.Muell. orth. var.

= Calytrix achaeta =

Species of flowering plant

Calytrix achaeta, commonly known as the white-flowered turkey bush, kerosene wood or fringe-myrtle, is a species of flowering plant in the myrtle family Myrtaceae and is endemic to north-western Australia. It is a shrub or tree with hairy branchlets, egg-shaped, linear or lance-shaped leaves, and white to cream-coloured flowers with 12 to 18 stamens in a single row.

== Description ==
Calytrix achaeta is a shrub or tree that typically grows to a height of 1–4 m (3 ft 3 in – 13 ft 1 in) and has hairy branchlets. Its leaves are widely spaced on main stems, but overlap on leafy side-shoots, egg-shaped, linear or lance-shaped, 0.8–2.5 mm (0.031–0.098 in) long and 0.3–1 mm (0.012–0.039 in) wide on a petiole up to 0.25 mm (0.0098 in) long, with a linear stipule up to 0.2 mm (0.0079 in) long at the base of the petiole. The flowers are arranged singly in leaf axils on a peduncle 0.25–0.5 mm (0.0098–0.0197 in) long with hairy, more or less round 1.0–2.5 mm (0.039–0.098 in) long, but that fall off as the flower develops. The floral tube is 1.5–3 mm (0.059–0.118 in) long with 10 ribs, and is spindle-shaped or cylindrical. The sepals lobes are 1.5–3 mm (0.059–0.118 in) long and 1.0–1.5 mm (0.039–0.059 in) wide and the petals are white to cream-coloured, lance-shaped, narrowly elliptic or linear, 2–5 mm (0.079–0.197 in) long and 1.0–1.75 mm (0.039–0.069 in) wide. There are about 12 to 18 white stamens in a single row, each 0.25–4 mm (0.0098–0.1575 in) long. Flowering occurs from January to August, and the seed is oval, 1.75–2.0 mm (0.069–0.079 in) long and 1.0–1.2 mm (0.039–0.047 in) wide.

== Taxonomy ==
The species was originally described in 1859 by the botanist Ferdinand von Mueller who gave it the name Calycothrix achaeta in the Transactions of the Philosophical Institute of Victoria from specimens collected "on the sandstone table land of Arnhem's Land". In 1867, George Bentham transferred the species to Calytrix as C. achaeta in his Flora Australiensis.

== Distribution and habitat ==
White-flowered turkey bush is found on flats or hills in the Kimberley region of Western Australia and the Top End of the Northern Territory where it grows in sandy soils over laterite, quartzite or granite.

== Ecology ==
This species has a lifespan of 11 to 20 years and forms a lignotuber from which it is able to resprout from following a fire.

== Uses ==
The Kunwinjku peoples know the plant as mandjumbak and the Kundjeyhmi know it as andjumbak. Indigenous Australians used the wood from the plant to make fish hooks, spearthrower pegs and for firewood.
