= Dalabon =

Dalabon or Dangbon may refer to:

- Dalabon people, an ethnic group of Australia
- Dalabon language, an Australian language
