= Ken Maddock =

Australian anthropologist

- from 1983
- Born: 1937; Hastings, New Zealand
- Died: 2 June 2003 (aged 65–66)
- Occupation: Emeritus Professor & Anthropological Scholar
- Known for: Social Anthropology of Aboriginal Australian Peoples
- Notable work: The Australian Aborigines : a portrait of their society. Penguin Press. London

Kenneth James Maddock (1937 – 2 June 2003) was an anthropologist in Australia, and scholar of Australian Aboriginal societies.

Over a period of approximately 40 years (from the 1960s through to the end of the 1990s) Maddock's range of interests, his depth of scholarship, his analytical acumen, and his lucidity of exposition lead him to make a contribution to the social anthropology of Aboriginal Australians "...second to none...".

== Biography ==
Maddock was born in Hastings, New Zealand, in 1937, obtained a Bachelor of Arts degree in Law, then (in 1964) a Masters of Arts in Anthropology at the University of Auckland.

Maddock's research interests took him to Aboriginal Australia where he undertook ethnographic fieldwork exploring religious beliefs and rituals of Aboriginal peoples in Arnhem Land under Dr L.R. Hiatt's supervision, and by 1969 completed a Doctor of Philosophy (PhD) on the Dalabon with the University of Sydney.

He obtained a position as the first lecturer to work with Macquarie University's foundation professor of Anthropology, and by 1991 achieved his own personal chair, retiring from the chair in 1995 yet continuing his association with the Department as one of Macquarie University's longest serving and most distinguished academics, until his death in 2003.

He is survived by his wife Sheila and three children, Catherine, James and Harold. .

== Selected bibliography ==
Maddock left a significant body of notes, papers and records of and about Aboriginal Australians plus records detailing some of the ramifications of researching Aboriginal Australians in the shadow of Australian land rights laws.

The record he has left behind includes, significantly, the following three books:

- Maddock, Kenneth (1972) The Australian Aborigines : a portrait of their society. Penguin Press. London
- Maddock, Kenneth (1980) Anthropology, law and the definition of Australian Aboriginal rights to land. Katholieke Universiteit. Faculteit der Rechtsgeleerdheid, Instituut voor Volksrech. Nijmegen, The Netherlands
- Maddock, Kenneth (1983) Your land is our land : Aboriginal land rights. Penguin. Ringwood, Victoria. ISBN 0-14-022505-6
