= Dalabon people =

Australian Aboriginal people

The Dalabon or Dangbon are an Australian Aboriginal people of the Northern Territory.

== Location ==
The Dalabon language is classified among the far East Arnhem Land language group, and as belonging to the Gunwinyguan language family. It is under severe threat of extinction.

At the time of European colonialisation, the tribal territory of the Dalabon is thought to have covered some 2,000 square miles (5,200 km^{2}), in south-western Arnhem Land. The anthropologist, Norman Tindale, placed their northern boundary at the upper Goyder River, and their heartland around the headwaters of the Phelp, Rose and Hart rivers. Linguistics scholar, Maïa Ponsonnet, states that, before the colonial period, the Dalbon people were located in Central Arnhem Land, with clan estates extending further north in the direction of the Arafura Sea.

Their immediate tribal environment consisted of several peoples: the Jawoyn to their southwest, Kune and Mayali speakers of the Bininj Kunwok dialect chain on their west-north western boundaries, the Ngalakgan on their southern frontier, and the Rembarrnga beyond their eastern limits.

The Dalabon today mainly live in an area east of Katherine, in Wugularr (formerly Beswick), Barunga (formerly Bamyili), Bulman and Weemol.

== Name ==
Traditionally, the people now called Dalabon had no collective name for themselves, and the term itself derives from the language spoken by members of the community.

Alternative names include:

- Buan, Bu:wan, Boun
- Ngalkbon

Anthropologist Norman Tindale posited the existence of a "tribe", the Dangbon, whom he considered distinct from the Dalabon; however, he was unable to provide an estimate for their tribal lands, other than locating these Dangbon to the east of the Liverpool River's headwaters and at those of the Cadell and Mann Rivers. He also provided a list of alternative names for this group:

- Gundangbon
- Dangbun
- Dangbar (typo)
- Gumauwurk

Contemporary scholarship now regards Dangbon as an alternative name for the Dalabon.

== The society ==
The Dalabon were semi-nomadic hunter gatherers, with access to abundant food resources culled throughout a mixed savannah and forest area which experienced three seasonal changes: a humid wet monsoonal period from December to April, followed by three cool dry months (May to July), and closing with the gradual onset of warming from August to November as a prelude to the return of the rainy summer season.

=== Social organization ===
Dalabon society had eight subsections, each of which had a male and female name, and which can be analysed in terms of three dichotomies. The first taxonomy identifies people in terms of patrimoieties of the Dua/Yirritja (Note: Ponsonnet transcribes the Dalabon form of these names, common in the area (see Yolngu) as Duwa/Yirridjdja. (Ponsonnet 2014, p. 34)) type. A second division of descent is matrilineal; the intersection of these two forms four sections. A third system has subsections to elicit the ideal father-and-son pairs.

The structure of these moieties and semi-moieties affects the ritual choreography of two major ceremonies, Gunabibi and Yabuduruwa, held on alternating years by the Dalabon and some contiguous tribes.

== Culture ==
=== Ethnographic studies ===
Kenneth Maddock did the first comprehensive studies of the Dalabon.

More recently, ethnographic work has also been conducted by linguists Nicholas Evans and Maïa Ponsonnet.

=== Mythology ===
In the earliest times, according to Dalabon cosmology, men passed the night-time under water, and had stumps for legs. The crocodile was master of the secret of fire. This changed when the kingfisher filched a firebrand from the crocodile, and set fire to the landscape, and men were burnt, leading them to learn the art of cooking and also acquire the legs they now have. Two pairs of immemorial, ancestral people (Nayunghyungkig), the Yirritja men Bulanj and Kodjok, and the Duwa women Kalidjan and Kamanj – collectively referred to as the Nakoorkko – wandered the earth, laying down the law inscribed in the nature of the Dalabon landscape and its reflex in Dalabon social customs.

=== Customs ===
Kenneth Maddock found the Dalabon still preserved a custom, which they called magard, which had been briefly noted earlier among the Yolngu and the Burarra, and called Mirriri, according to which a man whose classificatory sister had been subject to obscene abuse (Note: Evans, arguing that √beng covers more or less the idea of 'mind' in English, though perhaps etymologically related to a word for 'ear', writes: "The propound √beng, .. hardly ever occurs outside verbal formations. The main use of this word as a free form is with the specialized meaning '(taboo on)(a man) swearing at, concerning or in presence of sister'." (Evans 2007, pp. 72, 76)) implying she was engaged in sexual improprieties, was obliged to assault her, armed with a spear, boomerang or sticks. W. Lloyd Warner took the practice as a ritual expression of displeasure performed to allay the outbreak of hostilities between the respective clans of husband and wife; Lester Hiatt thought his material suggested rather a brother's disavowal of incestuous interest in his sister; Maddock took the Dalabon custom as a predictable ceremonial affirmation of a social relation forming part of a larger body of tribal etiquette. (Note: Burbank studied the same practice among the Nunggubuyu.(Burbank 1985, p. 47))

Linguist Nicholas Evans notes that the Dalabon root √men, with more or less the general sense of 'social conscience / awareness', emerges in an adjectival compound form like men-djabalarrk (obedient) that is applied also to non-human beings like a dog.

== Sources ==
- Burbank, Victoria K. (September 1985). "The Mirriri as Ritualized Aggression". Oceania. 56 (1): 47–55. doi:10.1002/j.1834-4461.1985.tb02107.x. JSTOR 40330847.
- Capell, Arthur (March 1960a). "The Wandarang and Other Tribal Myths of the Yabuduruwa Ritual". Oceania. 30 (3): 206–224. doi:10.1002/j.1834-4461.1960.tb00221.x. JSTOR 40329205.
- Capell, Arthur (September 1960b). "Myths and Tales of the Nunggubuyu, S.E. Arnhem Land". Oceania. 31 (1): 31–62. doi:10.1002/j.1834-4461.1960.tb01738.x. JSTOR 40329241.
- Evans, Nicholas (2007). "Standing up your mind: Remembering in Dalabon". In Amberber, Menghistu (ed.). The Language of memory in a Crosslinguistic Perspective. John Benjamins Publishing. pp. 67–95. ISBN 978-9-027-22375-3.
- Garde, Murray (2013). Culture, Interaction and Person Reference in an Australian Language: An ethnography of Bininj Gunwok communication. John Benjamins Publishing. ISBN 978-9-027-27124-2.
- Maddock, Kenneth (March 1970). "A Structural Interpretation of the Mirriri". Oceania. 40 (3): 165–176. doi:10.1002/j.1834-4461.1970.tb01088.x. JSTOR 40329867.
- Maddock, Kenneth (1989). "The Complexity of Dual Organization in Aboriginal Australia". In Maybury-Lewis, David; Almagor, Uri (eds.). The Attraction of Opposites: Thought and Society in the Dualistic Mode. University of Michigan Press. pp. 77–96. ISBN 978-0-472-08086-1.
- Ponsonnet, Maïa (2014). The Language of Emotions: The case of Dalabon (Australia). John Benjamins Publishing Company. ISBN 978-9-027-26920-1.
- Tindale, Norman Barnett (1974a). "Dalabon (NT)". Aboriginal Tribes of Australia: Their Terrain, Environmental Controls, Distribution, Limits, and Proper Names. Australian National University Press. ISBN 978-0-708-10741-6. Archived from the original on 20 February 2018.
- Tindale, Norman Barnett (1974b). "Dangbon (NT)". Aboriginal Tribes of Australia: Their Terrain, Environmental Controls, Distribution, Limits, and Proper Names. Australian National University Press. ISBN 978-0-708-10741-6. Archived from the original on 20 March 2020.
- Warner, William Lloyd (1937). A Black Civilization: A Social Study of an Australian Tribe. Harper & Brothers.
