= Yarrenyty Arltere Artists =

Indigenous Australian art collective

The Yarrenyty Arltere Artists are a collective of contemporary Indigenous artists who work across soft sculpture, painting, printmaking and video work. They are based out of the Yarrenyty Arltere (Larapinta Valley) town camp, an Aboriginal community on the west side of Alice Springs/Mparntwe in the Northern Territory of Australia.

== History ==
Yarrenyty Arltere Artists were established in 2000 as an offering of the town camp's Learning Centre. The collective was formalised as a social enterprise in 2008, and currently operates as an initiative of Tangentyere Council.

Prominent artists working at Yarrenyty Arltere include Dulcie Sharpe, Rhonda Sharpe and Marlene Rubuntja. The collective includes Arrernte, Luritja, Warlpiri and Pintupi artists, all who live in the town camp.

Their work is represented in national art collections around Australia including the National Gallery of Australia Queensland Gallery of Modern Art, National Gallery of Victoria and Museum and Art Gallery of the Northern Territory. Their work has been featured in major exhibitions including the Biennale of Sydney, and Tarnarthi.

== Major Exhibitions ==
- 2017 — Tarnanthi, Art Gallery of South Australia
- 2017 – NGV Triennial, National Gallery of Victoria
- 2018 – 21st Biennale of Sydney, In Our Hands
- 2022 – 4th National Indigenous Art Triennial, Ceremony, National Gallery of Australia
- 2025 — 5th National Indigenous Art Triennial,After the Rain, National Gallery of Australia

== Accolades ==
- 2013 – Rhonda Sharpe, Winner, Wandjuk Marika 3D Memorial Award, National Aboriginal and Torres Strait Islander Art Award
- 2015 – Rhonda Sharpe, Winner, 3D Award, National Aboriginal and Torres Strait Islander Art Award
- 2016 – Marlene Rubuntja, Winner, Vincent Lingiari Art Award
- 2021 – Rhonda Sharpe, Winner, Woollahra Small Sculpture Prize
- 2025 – Rhonda Sharpe, Winner, Textile Design Award, National Indigenous Fashion Awards
