= Iwantja (band) =

- Origin: Indulkana, South Australia, Australia
- Genres: Rock, metal, blues, reggae
- Years active: 2002–present
- Label: Wantok Musik
- Members: Jeremy Whiskey; Steven Brumby; Jacob Baker; Stewart Gaykamangu; Grant Cooley
- Past members: Angus Pearson; Nigel Baker; Geoffrey Baker; Ossie Goodwin; Jason Cullinan

Iwantja are an Australian Indigenous band from Indulkana in the APY lands formed in 2002. The band sings in Pitjantjatjara and Yankunytjatjara. They won the 2011 Deadly Award for Most Promising New Talent in Music.

== Later years ==
Jeremy Whiskey and Steven Brumby, along with Sammy Inkamala would form the Mr. J Whiskey Trio. They played a number of events which included the 2021 Adelaide Fringe Festival.

== Discography ==
Title	Details
Palya	Released: 2011; Label: Wantok Musik – w0006; Format: CD, digital download
