= Divide and Dissolve =

Australian instrumental doom metal band

- Origin: Melbourne, Victoria, Australia
- Genres: Doom metal
- Years active: 2015–present
- Label: Invada
- Members: Takiaya Reed
- Past members: Sylvie Nehill
- Website: divideanddissolve.com

Divide and Dissolve is an instrumental doom metal band based in Melbourne, Australia.

== Background ==
From 2017 to 2022, the band was a duo made up of saxophonist and guitarist Takiaya Reed, who is of Tsalagi and African-American heritage, and percussionist Sylvie Nehill, who is of Māori and White-Australian heritage. The pair met in 2016.

While the band's songs are primarily instrumental, their song titles are often highly political, and in interviews they have referenced their wish for their music to be "decolonising, decentralising, disestablishing, and destroying white supremacy."

== Career ==
In 2018, the music video for "Resistance" was removed from YouTube after it was criticised by a number of politicians and media outlets. The video features the band spitting and spraying urine-coloured water on monuments of colonial figures like Captain James Cook and John Batman. The video was subsequently reinstated, and YouTube apologised for the removal, stating, "When it’s brought to our attention that a video has been removed mistakenly, we act quickly to reinstate it."

Following two albums released by Australian record label Dero Arcade, the band's third album Gas Lit was released on vinyl and CD by English-based Invada Records in 2021, after a digital release in 2020. The album was produced by Unknown Mortal Orchestra’s Ruban Nielson.

The band's fourth album, Systemic, also produced by Nielson, was released in 2023. Founding member Sylvie Nehill left the band following the recording, and the band continued with Reed and a rotating line-up of drummers. With Reed as the sole full-time member, they released their fifth album Insatiable in 2025.

Along with the Californian group, Brant Bjork Trio and Jeremy Whiskey, Divide and Dissolve was booked to appear at the Blacken Open Air event on 23 September 2025.

== Discography ==
=== Albums ===
List of albums, with selected details
Title	Details
Basic	Released: March 2017; Format: LP, Digital; Label: DERO Arcade (DOR-00)
Abomination	Released: February 2018; Format: LP, Digital; Label: DERO Arcade (DOA-007)
Gas Lit	Released: January 2021; Format: LP, Digital, CD; Label: Invada Records (INV251LP)
Systemic	Released: June 2023; Format: LP, Digital, CD; Label: Invada Records (INV299)
Insatiable	Released: April 2025; Format: LP, Digital, CD; Label: Believe Direct Limited / Bella Union

== Awards and nominations ==
=== Australian Music Prize ===
The Australian Music Prize (the AMP) is an annual award of $50,000 given to an Australian band or solo artist in recognition of the merit of an album released during the year of award. It commenced in 2005.

Year	Nominee / work	Award	Result	Ref.
2025	Insatiable	Australian Music Prize	Nominated	

=== Music Victoria Awards ===
The Music Victoria Awards are an annual awards night celebrating Victorian music. They commenced in 2006.

Year	Nominee / work	Award	Result	Ref.
2017	Basic	Best Heavy Album	Won	
2018	Abomination	Best Rock/Punk Album	Nominated	
2021	Divide and Dissolve	Best Heavy Act	Nominated	
