= Jeremy Whiskey =

- Genres: Hard rock, rock
- Instrument: Guitar
- Years active: 2000s–present
- Formerly of: Iwantja, Mr. J Whiskey Trio, Jeremy Whiskey Project

Jeremy Whiskey is an Australian indigenous Hard Rock guitarist who has collaborated with established and upcoming indigenous musicians.

== Background ==
Jeremy Whiskey is a Pitjantjatjara and Yankunytjatjara man, hailing from APY Lands in South Australia. Described as a virtuoso by Off The Leash magazine, he grew up being influenced by The Shadows and The Doors. He has been involved in Mparntwe's heavy metal scene.

Whiskey fronted the Iwantja Band which was made up of himself on guitar and vocals, Ossie Goodwin on guitar, Steven Brumby on bass, Jacob Baker on drums and Stewart Gaykamangu on vocals and keyboard. He toured and recorded with them for years. He also formed the Mr. J Whiskey Trio which was made up of himself, Sammy Inkamala and Steven Brumby. The ensemble has played a number of events including the 2021 Adelaide Fringe Festival.

His solo album Dreamtime was released in 2022.

In a review of the Palya album by Iwantja, the reviewer said that if Jeremy Whiskey wasn't a guitar hero in the mold of the great Sixties axemen, he'd eat his words and his guitar strings.

== Career ==
In 2021, Whiskey played at the Adelaide Fringe Festival. The performance was reviewed by Barry Lenny of Broadway World. Prior to the Fringe Festival event, Lenny's only experience of Whiskey was seeing him on video playing acoustic guitar live at open air events and was expecting similar. What he experienced was very different with the Whiskey trio rocking and Whiskey playing a "frenzied solo of tapping and sweeping at lightning speed". After the fourth song with the shredding solos, he began to tire of it. The bassist and drummer left the stage to allow Whiskey to perform on his own. He likened the experience to water tumbling over rocks that was emotive and beautiful to listen to. He described Whiskey's voice as superb, rich, sonorous, and utterly beguiling". He finished off with saying that "Whiskey is a diamond in the rough, but a diamond, nonetheless".

On 5 December 2021, Whiskey was booked to appear at the Semaphore Music Festival. He had the 8 pm slot. His ensemble, the Jeremy Whiskey Project included brothers, Tristan & Kerry Bird, from the Southeastern Central Desert in the Northern Territory.

Also, in 2021 the J. Whiskey Trio, along with, Docker River Band, Wildfire Manwurrk Band, and Eastern Arrernte Band appeared at the 2021 Bush Bands Bash.

Collaborating with artist Tiger Yaltangki for the 2023 ROCK N ROLL exhibition, Whiskey provided the music which was inspired by AC/DC.

Working with Vincent Namatjira, Whiskey provided the music to accompany Namatjira's King Dingo exhibition.

In 2024, Whiskey was the headline act for the second night of the Parrtjima light festival which ran from 11 to 21 April. Also, that year, he provided the musical score for the Sunrise Journeys Indigenous laser, light and sound show that premiered at Ayers Rock Resort, Uluru.

Along with the Californian group, Brant Bjork Trio and Divide and Dissolve, Whiskey was booked to appear at the Blacken Open Air event on 23 September 2025.
