= National Indigenous Fashion Awards =

Annual Australian fashion awards

- Awarded for: Excellence in fashion
- Venue: Larrakia Country
- Country: Australia
- Presented by: Indigenous Fashion Projects (IFP)
- Eligibility: Indigenous peoples of Australia
- First award: 2020

The National Indigenous Fashion Awards, or NIFA, is an Australian awards ceremony for Aboriginal and Torres Strait Islander people in the textile and fashion industry.

== Background ==
NIFA was created in 2020 by Indigenous Fashion Projects (IFP), a program which is part of the Darwin Aboriginal Art Fair (DAAF) Foundation. It was created to showcase and celebrate the "innovation, diversity and ethical practices of Australia’s First Nations peoples in fashion and textiles, whilst contributing to the capacity building of the sector".

The awards are held annually on Larrakia Country, in Darwin, in the Northern Territory of Australia.

NIFA is supported by several sponsors, as well as the Australian Government's Office for the Arts as part of its Indigenous Visual Arts Industry program. Darwin Innovation Hub has also supported the event. In 2024, QIC began supporting three NIFA awards; the Community Collaboration, Wearable Art and Business Achievement. NIFA's principal medial partner is National Indigenous Television (NITV). The creative director is Nina Fitzgerald.

The awards provide pathways and opportunities for Indigenous creatives, with award recipients winning varying prizes including money prizes and mentorship programs.

== Categories ==
=== Current ===
NIFA presents awards in the following seven categories;

- Fashion Designer Award: for designers who have excelled both creatively and commercially. The award has been resented by Country Road since NIFA's inception in 2020.
- Traditional Adornment Award: for the creation of items that are made and worn to define and express culture.
- Community Collaboration Award: recognises relationships between First Nations communities and the textile and fashion industry, for collaborations where Indigenous peoples' agency is prioritised and the social and economic benefits flow to communities.
- Business Achievement Award: for a business showing both creative and commercial success, and having a positive impact on the Indigenous fashion sector.
- Textile Design Award
- Wearable Art Award
- Cecilia Cubillo Young Achiever Award: for individuals aged between 15-25 who excels in one or more areas including fashion, textile design, modelling, styling, wearable art, adornment and jewellery. It was introduced in 2024. The award is presented by Franchesca Cubillo, and is named after her mother, Cecilia Cubillo.

=== Previous ===
- Cultural Adornment and Wearable Art Award: last presented in 2021, and divided into two separate categories of "Traditional Adornment" and "Wearable Art" in 2022.
- Social and Environmental Contribution Award: last presented in 2021.
- Special Recognition Award: last presented in 2021.

== Awards by year ==
=== 2026 ===
The 2026 NIFA ceremony was held on the 5th of August. There were three judges for the awards in 2026: Lisa Friedl, the creative director of Country Road; Lindyn Rowland, the founder and creative director of Rowland Vision; and Julie Shaw, a Yuwaalaraay woman and the founder and creative director of MAARA Collective, and the recipient of the Fashion Design and Community Collaboration NIFA awards in 2020.

One winner, Padmini Govind from Tharangni Studio, flew in from India to receive the Community Collaboration Award alongside Janet Marawarr from Bábbarra Women’s Centre.

2026 NIFA winners
| Award | Winner | Supported by |
|---|---|---|
| Fashion Designer Award | Michelle Pulatuwayu Woody Minnapinni (Jilamara Arts & Crafts Association) | Country Road |
| Traditional Adornment Award | Delvene Cockatoo-Collins | Desart |
| Community Collaboration Award | Bábbarra Women’s Centre x Tharangini Studio | QIC |
| Business Achievement Award | KAFTA (Kimberley Aboriginal Fashion Textiles Art) | Canberra Centre |
| Textile Design Award | Lillardia Briggs-Houston | Royal Melbourne Institute of Technology (RMIT) |
| Wearable Art Award | Lucy Simpson (Gaawaa Miyay Design) | Pacific Werribee |
| Cecilia Cubillo Young Achiever Award | Jake Powers | Franchesca Cubillo |

=== 2025 ===
A collaboration between Djilpin Arts artists and Kate Sale and Fiona Gavino was given a "highly commended" status. The Business Achievement Award was accepted by Lauren Jarrett on behalf of her daughter, Melissa Greenwood. The judges were Lisa Waup (an artist and curator), Yatu Widders Hunt (of Cox Inall Ridgeway and board member of the Australian Fashion Council), and Jessica Poynter (head of design for accessories at Country Road).

2025 NIFA winners
| Award | Winner | Supported by |
|---|---|---|
| Fashion Designer Award | Clair Helen Parker | Country Road |
| Traditional Adornment Award | Rena Ngalinggama Guyula (Gapuwiyak Culture and Arts) | Helen Kaminski |
| Community Collaboration Award | Jilamara Arts and Crafts Association x Tiwi Artists | Canberra Centre |
| Business Achievement Award | Miimi & Jiinda (Melissa Greenwood) | QIC |
| Textile Design Award | Rhonda Sharpe (Yarrenyty Arltere Artists) | RMIT |
| Wearable Art Award | Cleonie Quayle | Eastland |
| Cecilia Cubillo Young Achiever Award | Cindy Rostron | Franchesca Cubillo |

=== 2024 ===
The Cecilia Cubillo Young Achiever Award was introduced in 2024. The NIFA winners and nominees were able to have their designs tour at Canberra Centre and Eastland. Michelle Maynard, the manager of IFP, crowned the award winners.

The judges included; Yatu Widders Hunt, Elaine George (the first Aboriginal model to be featured on the cover of Vogue), Lisa Waup, and Nimmi Premaratne (of Country Road).

2024 NIFA winners
| Award | Winner | Supported by |
|---|---|---|
| Fashion Designer Award | Simone Arnol | Country Road |
| Traditional Adornment Award | Philomena Yeatman (Yarrabah Arts & Cultural Precinct) | Helen Kaminski |
| Community Collaboration Award | Melissa Greenwood (Miimi & Jiinda) x Gilat Shani (Unreal Fur) | Canberra Centre |
| Business Achievement Award | Ngali (Denni Francisco) | QIC |
| Textile Design Award | Jay Jurrupula Rostron (Bábbarra Women's Centre) | RMIT |
| Wearable Art Award | Lillardia Briggs-Houston | Eastland |
| Cecilia Cubillo Young Achiever Award | Kahlia Rogers | Franchesca Cubillo |

=== 2023 ===
The awards ceremony took place on Wednesday, the 9th of August, at the Deckchair Cinema in Darwin. Tickets to the event were sold out. There were 60 nominees across the six categories this year, a record number for NIFA. The judges were Yatu Widders Hunt, Lisa Waup, Nimmi Premaratne, and Perina Drummond (founder of Jira Models).

2023 NIFA winners
| Award | Winner | Supported by |
|---|---|---|
| Fashion Designer Award | Lillardia Briggs-Houston | Country Road |
| Traditional Adornment Award | Gapuwiyak Culture & Arts artists | Northern Territory Government |
| Community Collaboration Award | Gapuwiyak Culture & Arts x Aly de Groot | Canberra Centre |
| Business Achievement Award | Ikuntji Artists | DAAF Foundation |
| Textile Design Award | Rowena Morgan (Nagula Jarndu) | RMIT |
| Wearable Art Award | Rhonda Sharpe (Yarrenyty Arltere Artists) | Robina Town Centre |

=== 2022 ===
DAAF Creative Director Shilo McNamee spoke at the ceremony, which was held on the 4th of August. The IFP joined forces with fashion magazine Marie Claire to cover the awards, and the magazine created and published a photoshoot of the winners. The judges were Yatu Widders Hunt, Prue-Ellen Thomas (head of marketing and communications at the Australian Fashion Council), Jacklyn Rivera (a design manager at Country Road), and Perina Drummond.

Bábbarra Women's Centre, Bábbarra Designs, was also given a "highly commended" status. The centre was a nominee for the Business Achievement Award.

2022 NIFA winners
| Award | Winners | Supported by |
|---|---|---|
| Fashion Designer Award | Denni Francisco (Ngali) | Country Road |
| Traditional Adornment Award | Esther Yarllarlla | DAAF Foundation |
| Community Collaboration Award | Mimili Maku Arts (Linda Puna) x Unreal Fur | Canberra Centre |
| Business Achievement Award | Clothing The Gaps (Laura Thompson) | KIN Fashion |
| Textile Design Award | Philomena Yeatman (Yarrabah Arts & Cultural Precinct) | RMIT |
| Wearable Art Award | Lillardia Briggs-Houston (Ngarru Miimi) | Northern Territory Government |

=== 2021 ===
The ceremony was hosted by Rachel Hocking. There were 31 nominees over the six categories. The judges were Yatu Widders Hunt, Maria Rinaldi-Cant, Gary Lang, and Leila Naja Hibri.

2021 NIFA winners
| Award | Winner | Supported by |
|---|---|---|
| Fashion Design Award | Denni Francisco (Ngali) | Country Road |
| Cultural Adornment and Wearable Art Award | Paul McCann | DAAF Foundation |
| Community Collaboration Award | Anindilyakwa Arts with Dr Aly de Groot and Anna Reynolds | Darwin Innovation Hub |
| Special Recognition Award | Bima Wear | Northern Territory Government |
| Textile Design Award | Eunice Napanangka Jack (Ikuntji Artists) | RMIT |
| Environmental and Social Contribution Award | Mylene Holroyd (Pormpuraaw Art & Culture), featuring Simone Arnol designs | Northern Territory Government |

=== 2020 ===
The ceremony was broadcast live on NITV and hosted by Rachel Hocking, anchor of The Point. There were 33 nominees for the awards. Guest performer Eric Avery provided the music for the show, and Mary Williams gave the Larrakia Welcome to Country.

The inaugural NIFA event was originally intended to be held as an in person gala, but ultimately had to be hosted virtually, due to the COVID-19 pandemic.

| Award | Winner | Supported by |
|---|---|---|
| Fashion Design Award | Julie Shaw (MAARA Collective) | Country Road |
| Cultural Adornment and Wearable Art Award | Peggy Griffiths (Waringarri Aboriginal Arts) | DAAF Foundation |
| Community Collaboration Award | Julie Shaw (MAARA Collective) x Bula'bula Aboriginal Corporation | Northern Territory Government |
| Special Recognition Award | Bede Tungutalum | Northern Territory Government |
| Textile Design Award | Kieren Karritpul (Merrepen Arts, Language & Culture) | RMIT and Ross Bonthorne |
| Environmental and Social Contribution Award | Ninti One Limited | Northern Land Council |
