= Nagara people =

Indigenous Australians of the Northern Territory in Australia

The Nagara, also written Nakara, are an indigenous Australian people of Arnhem Land in the Northern Territory. They speak the Nakkara language.

== Country ==
The Nagara owned roughly 200 sq.miles of tribal grounds around Boucaut Bay, and a stretch of territory southwest of the Blyth River. Their inland extension went as far as the Tomkinson River and its mouth.

== History ==
Faced with extinction the surviving members of the Gadjalivia melted into the Nagara in recent times, with the result that the latter took over the traditional lands associated with the former tribe.

== Alternative names ==
- Naka:ra
- Nakara
- Ngara
- Na'kara
- Nakkara

== Sources ==
- Keen, Ian (December 1982). "How Some Murngin Men Marry Ten Wives: The Marital Implications of Matrilateral Cross-Cousin Structures". Man. New Series. 17 (4): 620–642. doi:10.2307/2802037. JSTOR 2802037.
- Tindale, Norman Barnett (1974). "Nakara (NT)". Aboriginal Tribes of Australia: Their Terrain, Environmental Controls, Distribution, Limits, and Proper Names. Australian National University. Archived from the original on 20 March 2020.
