= Kundjeyhmi dialect =

Australian Aboriginal language

Kundjeyhmi
- Gundjeihmi
- Native to: Australia
- Region: Northern Territory
- Ethnicity: Bininj
- Native speakers: 12 (2021 census)
- Language family: Arnhem: Gunwinyguan; Gunwinggic; Bininj Kunwok; Kundjeyhmi

Language codes
- ISO 639-3: –
- Glottolog: gund1246
- AIATSIS: n71 Kundjeyhmi

Kundjeyhmi (spelt Gundjeihmi until 2015) is a dialect of Bininj Kunwok, an Australian Aboriginal language. The Aboriginal people who speak Kundjeyhmi are Bininj people, who live primarily in Kakadu National Park. Kundjeyhmi is considered an endangered dialect, with young speakers increasingly switching to English, Aboriginal English, Kunwinjku and Australian Kriol. Kundjeyhmi has a number of lexical and grammatical features that differ from the larger Kunwinjku and Kuninjku dialects.

In June 2015, the then Gundjeihmi dialect group officially adopted standard Kunwinjku orthography, meaning it would in future be spelt Kundjeyhmi.
