= Wildfire Manwurrk =

Australian indigenous rock band

- Origin: Northern Territory, Australia
- Genres: Hard rock, punk rock
- Years active: 2010s - present
- Spinoff of: KK Band
- Members: Scott Cameron; Ernest Rostron; Johnson Rostron; Leo Rostron; Sires Rostron; Victor Rostron

Wildfire Manwurrk is an Australian Indigenous rock band from Central West Arnhem Land in the Northern Territory of Australia.

== Background ==
The band is made up of six members of the Rostron family who have played music together since 2012. The band includes Victor Rostron, four of his sons and his nephew. The group's lyrics are in the Kune tongue which is considered an endangered language. They started out as Karrkad Kanjdji aka the KK band. The KK abbreviation is Short for Karrkad (Top) and Kanjdji (Bottom) between Salt Water and Fresh Water. They performed for some time in the Northern Territory at stations and festivals.

At some stage the band's name had changed and in 2021, The Next Future, EP was released under their new name, Wildfire Manwurrk.

The music was described by Anna Rose of The Music as the Kune language being merged with "a thumping heavy sound with traditional elements".

== KK Band career ==
There were at least two recordings by KK Band. One was "Band Dancing Moon", credited to Victor and KK. The other was Saw the People, credited to the KK Band.

The KK Boys played at the Maningrida Lurra Festival in 2014. They performed the song, "Daluk, Binnij" (Man Woman) which was sung in Kune Language from the Dalabon Clan. It was produced by the Wiwa Project and filmed by the Wiwa Project Media Crew.

In June 2015, the KK Band, along with the Bad T-Boys from Nukka, the Lazy Late Boys, and the Lonely Boys played at the Barunga Festival, which was the event's thirtieth anniversary.

Along with Shaka Band, Wugularr Drifters, Manual Dhurray, Gurrumul, and Reggae Joe, the KK Band appear on NITV On The Road: Barunga Festival Season 2 Episode 2, Barunga Bush Bands.

=== Line up ===
- James Kelly – drums
- Willy Redford – vocals
- Cyrus Rostron – vocals, lead guitar
- Ernest Rostron – rhythm guitar
- Johnson Rostron – bass
- Victor Rostron – vocals

== Wildfire Manwurrk career ==
In 2021, Wildfire Manwurrk along with the Mr. J Whiskey Trio, the Docker River Band, and Eastern Arrernte Band appeared at the 2021 Bush Bands Bash.

It was reported by Blunt magazine on 20 October 2022 that their new single "Don't Smoke" was out. In the punk rock genre, the song had a message about the health issues of the habit. The explanation as to why it was in the punk genre was, "We put it with a hard punk music sound so people out here in our communities are hearing something different to make them stop and pay attention."

=== "Lonely Bangardi" and The Next Future EP ===
The group recorded the single "Lonely Bangardi" which was reviewed by Dan Condon of Double J. In the article which was titled, "Wildfire Manwurrk have released one of the best hard rock songs of the year", Condon said that it was like a "potent combination Rose Tattoo, The Hellacopters and Pennywise". According to the 22 August article on MusicFeeds, this was their first official recording and their debut single.

"Lonely Bangardi" was the lead song on their The Next Future EP which was released in November. It was sung in the Kune language. It was about a boyfriend and girlfriend breaking up over and argument and jealousy and wanting to get that love back. To promote the release, a video that was filmed and edited by Robert Sherwood and co-directed by the band, Sherwood and Natalie Carey (Valentina Brave) was made.

=== Further activities ===
It was reported by NITV on 14 July 2023 that the group were finalists for the 2023 National Indigenous Music Awards. Along with King Stingray, Wildfire Manwurrk were the multiple award winners. Wildfire Manwurrk won the Community Clip of the Year for Mararradj. They also won the Archie Roach Foundation Award.

== Members ==
- Sires Rostron – lead singer and lead guitarist
- Johnson Rostron – lead singer and bassist
- Ernest Rostron – rhythm guitar
- Leo Rostron – rhythm guitar
- Victor Rostron – lead singer, didgeridoo (Morle) and clapsticks
- Scott Cameron – backing singer and drummer

== Discography ==
EP
Act	Release	Catalogue	Year	Tracks	Notes
Wildfire Manwuurk	The Next Future		2022	"Don't Smoke", "Ranger Boat"*, "Mararradj"*, "Homeland" "Lonely Bangardi", "Yawk Yawk"*	* featuring Victor Rostron

== See also ==
- Cindy Rostron - another member of the Rostron family
- Indigenous rock
