= Larrakia =

Larrakia (also Larrakeyah and other variants) may refer to:

- Larrakia people, an ethnic group of Australia
- Larrakia language, their language
- Larrakeyah, a suburb of Darwin, Australia
  - Larrakeyah Barracks, the primary Australian military base in the Northern Territory
  - Radio Larrakia, a Darwin-based FM-band community radio station
  - Larrakia Park, a park in Darwin including the Darwin Football Stadium
- HMAS Larrakia, two ships of the Royal Australian Navy
- Adsteam Larrakia, a tugboat and emergency response vessel operating at the Wickham Point LNG terminal

== See also ==
- Latakia (disambiguation), a city in Syria, and related terms
