= Gunavidji =

Aboriginal Australian people of Arnhem Land

The Gunavidji people, also written Kunibidji and Kunibídji and also known as the Ndjébbana, are an Aboriginal Australian people of Arnhem Land in the Northern Territory.

== Language ==
The Gunavidji speak Ndjébbana, which is one of the Maningrida languages.

== Country ==
Gunavidji traditional lands extend over some 500 square miles (1,300 km^{2}) in and around the valley along the Liverpool River in and as far at the point where the Tomkinson River flows into the mangrove swamps. Their main base is at Maningrida township.

== Cultural practices ==
They do not practise circumcision.

== Alternative names ==
- Gunaviji
- Gunawitji
- Gunabidji
- Gunabwidji
- Gunjibidji
- Witji

== Sources ==
- Auld, Glenn (2007). "Talking books for children's home use in a minority Indigenous Australian language context". Educational Technology. 23 (1): 48–67.
- Auld, Glenn; Djabibba, Lena (2015). "Using digital technologies with Aboriginal and Torres Strait Islander students". In Henderson, Michael; Romeo, Geoff (eds.). Teaching and Digital Technologies: Big Issues and Critical Questions. Cambridge University Press. pp. 57–70. ISBN 978-1-107-45197-1.
- Capell, A. (June 1942). "Languages of Arnhem Land, North Australia". Oceania. 12 (4): 364–392. doi:10.1002/j.1834-4461.1942.tb00365.x. JSTOR 40327959.
- Keen, Ian (December 1982). "How Some Murngin Men Marry Ten Wives: The Marital Implications of Matrilateral Cross-Cousin Structures". Man. New Series. 17 (4): 620–642. doi:10.2307/2802037. JSTOR 2802037.
- Tindale, Norman Barnett (1974). "Gunavidji (NT)". Aboriginal Tribes of Australia: Their Terrain, Environmental Controls, Distribution, Limits, and Proper Names. Australian National University. ISBN 978-0-708-10741-6. Archived from the original on 20 March 2020.
