= Rembarrnga =

The Rembarrnga people, also spelt Rembarunga and other variants, are an Aboriginal Australian people of the Northern Territory.

== Language ==
The Rembarrnga language is a non-Pama-Nyungan language belonging to the Gunwinyguan language family.

== Country ==
Rembarrnga country covered some 5,000 square miles (13,000 km^{2}), extending from the headwaters of the Mann, Cadell, Wilton, and Blyth rivers, to the arid plateau to the south.

== Alternative names ==
- Rembarrnga, Rembaranga, Rembarnga, Rembranga
- Ranjbarngo, Rainbarngo, Reinbaranga
- Rembarrna
- Maiadi
- Maieli, Majali, Maiali, Maielli

== Sources ==
- Saulwick, Adam (2007). "Rembarrnga poly synthesis in cross-linguistic perspective". In Miestamo, Matti; Wälchli, Bernhard (eds.). New Challenges in Typology: Broadening the Horizons and Redefining the Foundations. Walter de Gruyter. pp. 102–126. ISBN 978-3-110-19890-4.
- Tindale, Norman Barnett (1974). "Rembarunga (NT)". Aboriginal Tribes of Australia: Their Terrain, Environmental Controls, Distribution, Limits, and Proper Names. Australian National University. ISBN 978-0-708-10741-6. Archived from the original on 12 April 2021.
