= Ndjébbana language =

Australian Aboriginal language of north-central Arnhem land

Ndjébbana
- Djeebbana, Gunavidji
- Region: Northern Territory
- Ethnicity: Gunavidji
- Native speakers: 367 (2021 census)
- Language family: Arnhem: Maningrida; Ndjébbana

Language codes
- ISO 639-3: djj
- Glottolog: djee1236
- AIATSIS: N74
- ELP: Ndjebbana

The Ndjébbana language, also spelt Djeebbana and Ndjebanna and also known as Kunibidji (Gunavidji, Gunivugi, Gombudj), is a Burarran language spoken by the Gunavidji (Ndjebbana) people of North-central Arnhem Land in the Northern Territory of Australia.

"Gunavidji" (and variant forms) is an exonym used by speakers of Kunbarlang, Kunwinjku and Maung languages.

== Phonology ==
=== Consonants ===
	Peripheral		Laminal	Apical	
	Labial	Velar	Palatal	Alveolar	Retroflex
Plosive	b~p	k	ɟ~c	d~t	ɖ~ʈ
Nasal	m	ŋ	ɲ	n	ɳ
Rhotic				ɾ~r	ɻ
Lateral				l	ɭ
Approximant	w		j		

- Sounds /b, ɟ, d, ɖ/ may also be heard as voiceless [p, c, t, ʈ] when in word-final position or when preceding other stop consonants. They may also occur as geminated, where they are always pronounced as [pː, cː, tː, ʈː].
- /ɾ/ can be heard as either a flap [ɾ] or a trill [r].
- /k/ can be heard as [ɣ] in intervocalic position or when followed by a liquid sound.
- /b/ can be heard as [β] when in intervocalic position.

=== Vowels ===
	Front	Central	Back
High	i iː		ʊ ʊː
Mid	ɛ ɛː		ɔ ɔː
Low		a aː	

- Vowels /ɛ, a, ɔ, ʊ/ may have a [ɪ] vowel off-glide heard as [ɛᶦ, æᶦ, ɔᶦ, ʊᶦ], when preceding a laminal-palatal consonant.

Phoneme/Sound	Allophones	Notes
/i/ [i]	[ɪ]	Is heard when in lax or unstressed positions.
/ɛ/ [ɛ]	[e]	Can also be heard when before a laminal-palatal consonant or a semivowel.
/a/ [ä]	[æ]	May also be heard when following a laminal-palatal consonant.
/ɔ/ [ɔ]	[o]	Can also be heard when in stressed positions.
/ʊ/ [ʊ]	[u]	Is always heard when in word-final position.
