= Lester Hiatt =

Australian anthropologist (1931–2008)

Lester Richard Hiatt (1931–14 February 2008), known as Les Hiatt, was a scholar of Australian Aboriginal societies who promoted Australian Aboriginal studies within both the academic world and within the wider public for almost 50 years. He is now regarded as one of Australia's foremost anthropologists.

== Early life and education ==
Hiatt was born in Gilgandra, New South Wales, the eldest of three boys. His father was the son of English immigrants from Gloucestershire and Devonshire. Hiatt's father was a book-keeper who rose to be manager of White Wings Flour Mill. His mother was the daughter of a Gilgandra pastry cook.

He graduated in dentistry at Sydney University in 1952, and, after passing over further studies to qualify as a doctor, -financial considerations ruled that out- he shifted his focus to anthropology. His choice had been influenced by a friendship he had formed with a Sri Lankan student of that topic, Laksiri Jayasuriya, during his undergraduate years at Wesley College. He re-enrolled in an arts course to major in anthropology, studying under A.P. Elkin and Mervyn Meggitt, though John Anderson also became an important influence. In 1955 as he opened a practice in Bourke. In 1952, he first encountered A.R. Radcliffe-Brown's work, in particular the latter's Structure and Function in primitive society. (1950) While in Bourke he met and married the first of his three wives, (Note: The others being Judy Barber and Ursula Smilde.) a school teacher Betty Meehan, who came from a notable unionist family with communist sympathies. They moved to Sydney and he graduated in anthropology at Sydney University in 1958. A scholarship took him to study at the Australian National University under John Barnes and Bill Stanner.

He obtained his PhD with a thesis on "Kinship and Conflict" in 1963, and rewrote the manuscript for publication in 1965 as Kinship And Conflict: A Study Of An Aboriginal Community In Northern Arnhem Land.

== Primary ethnographic research ==
With his then wife, Betty Meehan, Hiatt set off in 1959 to do his primary, detailed ethnographic fieldwork for his doctorate in, and around, Maningrida, in the Northern Territory's Arnhem Land. His focus was on the Gidjingali community of the Burarra. (Note: Norman Tindale treated Hiatt's Gidjingarli as essentially Burarra, though noting that Hiatt had informed him that it was a distinct tribe.)

From the late 1950s (at which time the Australian Aboriginal community of Maningrida was first being formed and gazetted as a township), Hiatt spent more than 45 years, off and on, researching, learning and recording the views, language, songs, stories, understandings, and practices of the Burarra-speaking Gidjingarli members.

During his time at Meningrida, Hiatt produced at least one film and a book in memory of Frank Gurrmanamana, one of the 'informants' with whom he worked most closely.

In some of his late work, Hiatt attempted to analyze the ethics and value systems of Gidjingarli culture in terms of evolutionary biology and the theories of Edward Westermarck's regarding the origins of morality.

== Waiting for Harry ==
Waiting for Harry is a film dealing with the reburial of an Anbarra man, Les Angabarraparra, at Djunawunya in Arnhem Land in July 1978, when his remains had been removed from Maningrida and returned to his traditional lands. The idea came from Frank Gurramanamana after he viewed other films on Aboriginal customary life at the AIATSIS archives in Canberra. The director was Kim McKenzie, who had been running the AIAS Film Unit.

The main mourners are Frank Gurramanamana, the deceased clan brother, and Harry Diama, Angabarraparra's maternal uncle and the senior blood-relative, without the presence of both of whom the ritual sequence cannot be completed. The keynote theme is Harry's repeated absences: business engagements demand his attention in a nearby town; his son is up on charges and requires the father's presence in court. These continuous interruptions upset the Cape Stewart mob, who have sailed over to attend the funeral, and who were put off by Harry's endless delays. In the meantime, various aspects of the ceremony are filmed: the painting of the hollow-log coffin (yirritja), the chanting of clan songs, the gannet dance, all preliminaries before the final breaking of the bones, their arrangement in the coffin, and the interment. Hiatt, though an anthropologist, has kinship bonds with the bereaved which require him to participate actively in the proceedings he otherwise is trained to observe with an outsider's ethnographic eye.

The film won the Royal Anthropological Institute Film Award in 1982 for "the most outstanding film on social, cultural and biological anthropology or archaeology". Margaret Clunies Ross dedicated a long essay to the analysis of the film in 1989.

== Institutional reforms and change ==
Institutional assistance and support for 'Aboriginalist' scholarship (studies into Australian Aboriginal societies) has improved from that time when Hiatt first started his own studies, and he has since been attributed with playing an important role assisting and supporting this reform (particularly during the Whitlam and Fraser governments, with the early establishment of the Australian Institute of Aboriginal and Torres Strait Islander Studies

== Contributions to Australian anthropology ==
In addition to Dr Hiatt's detailed ethnographic records and works, there is a substantial body of written works inquiring into, questioning and sometimes challenging some of the more conventionally 'received' anthropological knowledges held by academia and the general public about Australian Aboriginal peoples. Some of these works are identified and briefly annotated below.

In one of his earliest publications, Hiatt effectively demolished the previously conventional understanding, established by the British social anthropologist Alfred Radcliffe-Brown according to which patrilineal descent is the primary social organisational principle across all Aboriginal Australians.

== See also ==
- Sydney Push

== Works ==
- Hiatt, L. R. (1968). "Gidjingali marriage arrangements". In Lee, Richard B.; DeVore, Irven (eds.). Man the Hunter. Chicago: Aldine Publishing Company. pp. 165–75.
- Hiatt, L. R. (1985). "Aboriginal land ownership". Current Affairs Bulletin. 62 (3): 17–23. ISSN 0011-3182.
- Hiatt, L. R. (1988). "Aboriginal conceptions of the workings of nature". In Home, R.W. (ed.). Australian science in the making. Cambridge University Press. pp. 1–21.
- Hiatt, L. R. (1996). Arguments about Aborigines: Australia and the Evolution of Social Anthropology. Cambridge University Press.
- Hiatt, L. R. (2001). "It seemed an interesting career to follow". In Gray, Geoffry (ed.). Before it's too late: anthropological reflections, 1950–1970. University of Sydney. pp. 108–116. Oceania Monograph 51
- Hiatt, L. R. (2003). "Why the invasion of Iraq was immoral". Dissent. No. 12.
- Hiatt, L. R. (2004). "Edward Westermarck and the origin of moral ideas". In Barnard, Alan J. (ed.). Hunter-gatherers in history, archaeology and anthropology. Berg. ISBN 978-1-859-73820-7.

== Sources ==
- Allen, Harry (5 May 2013). "Lester Richard Hiatt (1931–2008)". Australian Archaeological Association.
- Brown, Malcolm (21 February 2008). "A culture made less remote: Les Hiatt, 1931-2008". The Sydney Morning Herald.
- Bryson, Ian (2002). Bringing to Light: A History of Ethnographic Filmmaking at the Australian Institute of Aboriginal and Torres Strait Islander Studies. Aboriginal Studies Press. ISBN 978-0-855-75382-5.
- Clunies Ross, Margaret (1989). "The Aesthetics and Politics of an Arnhem Land Ritual". The Drama Review. 33 (4): 107–27. doi:10.2307/1145970. JSTOR 1145970.
- Crawford, Peter Ian (1992). Film As Ethnography. Manchester University Press. ISBN 978-0-719-03683-5.
- Gurrmanamana, Frank; Hiatt, L. R.; McKenzie, Kim (2002). People of the Rivermouth: The Joborr texts of Frank Gurrmanamana. Aboriginal Studies Press. ISBN 9781876944087.
- Hamilton, Annette (July 2008). "In Memorium: L. R. Hiatt (1931 - 2008)". Oceania. 78 (2): 129–136. doi:10.1002/j.1834-4461.2008.tb00033.x. JSTOR 40495574.
- Hiatt, Lester R. (2007). "Forward". In Weiner, James F.; Glaskin, Katie (eds.). Customary Land Tenure & Registration in Australia and Papua New Guinea. Vol. 3. Australian National University Press. pp. ix–xiv. ISBN 9781921313264. JSTOR j.ctt24h97r.3.
- Hollmann, Jeremy C. (2006). "Review: Hunter-Gatherers in History, Archaeology and Anthropology by Alan Barnard". Africa: Journal of the International African Institute. 76 (1). Cambridge University Press: 287–289. doi:10.3366/afr.2006.76.2.287. JSTOR 40027126. S2CID 142130602.
- Macfarlane, Alan; Hiatt, Lester (14 July 2005). "Interview of Les Hiatt by Alan Macfarlane". Alan Macfarlane.com.
- Peterson, Nicolas (March 2006). "'I Can't Follow You on This Horde-Clan Business at All': Donald Thomson, Radcliffe -Brown and a Final Note on the Horde". Oceania. 76 (1): 16–26. doi:10.1002/j.1834-4461.2006.tb03030.x. JSTOR 40332006.
- "Waiting for Harry". Royal Anthropological Institute. Archived from the original on 29 November 2014.
- "Waiting for Harry [from the AIATSIS Collection]". Ronin Films.
- Tindale, Norman Barnett (1974). "Barara (NT)". Aboriginal Tribes of Australia: Their Terrain, Environmental Controls, Distribution, Limits, and Proper Names. Australian National University.
