= Ian Keen =

Australian anthropologist (born 1938)

Ian Keen (born 21 November 1938) is an Australian anthropologist, whose research interests cover Yolngu kinship structures and religion, Aboriginal land rights and economies, and language.

== Life ==
Keen was born in the northern London borough of Finchley in late 1938, and spent his early years under the Blitz during World War II, during which his father, a former grocer, served in the Signal corps. He left school at 16 before finishing his secondary school education, and was trained in stained glass craftsmanship and lithography at Hornsey School of Art. He practiced his trade, primarily as an art restorer, in Norwich for a decade. In the late 1960s he decided he preferred a different career direction, completed his secondary schooling, and, in 1970, enrolled in a course of anthropology at University College London, studying under Mary Douglas. He graduated with a B.Sc in 1973. During his undergraduate years, he undertook some fieldwork in the Jura. His initial intention was to pursue work in the field of Oceania studies, possibly in Indonesia.

Just at that time, Derek Freeman had delegated Nicolas Peterson to organize a post-graduate research scholarship for work on Aboriginal religion as evinced in song symbolism among men in northern Australia, particularly in Arnhem Land. Keen proved successful in his application, and he began his fieldwork by setting up camp at Milingimbi in September 1974, where he stayed for 14 months, and followed it up with a 10-month stint at Nanggalala on the mainland. He learnt Djambarrpuyŋu at Milingimbi while focusing his research on the nexus between kinship, social organisation and religious rituals. Particularly with regard to ceremonial rites, his first year of intense fieldwork on the island yielded a rich harvest of over 100 hours of recordings of mortuary song cycles. Before returning to Canberra, he spent a month at Oenpelli (present day Gunbalanya) assisting the Northern Land Council in mapping out the aboriginal landscape in order to prepare an indigenous report perspective for the Fox Inquiry on uranium mining in the area. This marked the beginning of many contributions Keen would make in subsequent years to the cause of Aboriginal land rights.

Keen completed his doctoral dissertation, One Ceremony, One Song, in 1978, and obtained his PhD the following year. He took up a teaching appointment at the University of Queensland and, after several years, returned to the Australian National University for a post as senior lecturer in 1987. The following year he edited a volume of essays Being Black(1988) whose quality Nicolas Peterson, writing in 2015, stated was "yet to be surpassed".

He spent the academic year 1992–1993 at Oxford University and, in 2000, was a visiting professor at the National Museum of Ethnology in Osaka. Keen retired to Harold's Cross in 2002 but continues to be active in the field.

== Evaluations ==
While one reviewer of his 1994 monograph Knowledge and Secrecy in an Aboriginal Religion, had the impression Keen's approach echoed that of Meyer Fortes, for P. G. Toner, Keen's work creatively took on board elements of the heterodox approach in Australian anthropology associated with the name of Les Hiatt.

== Bibliography ==
- "How Some Murngin Men Marry Ten Wives: The Marital Implications of Matrilateral Cross-Cousin Structures". Man. New Series. 17 (4): 620–642. December 1982. doi:10.2307/2802037. JSTOR 2802037.
- Being Black: Aboriginal Cultures of 'Settled' Australia. Canberra: Aboriginal Studies Press. 1988.
- Knowledge and Secrecy in an Aboriginal Religion: Yolngu of North-East Arnhem Land. Oxford: Clarendon Press. 1994.
- "Metaphor and the Metalanguage: 'Groups' in Northeast Arnhem Land". American Ethnologist. 22 (3): 502–527. August 1995. doi:10.1525/ae.1995.22.3.02a00030. JSTOR 645969.
- with Takako Yamada, eds. (2001). Identity and Gender in Hunting and Gathering Societies. Osaka: National Museum of Ethnology.
- Aboriginal Economy and Society: Australia at the Threshold of Colonisation. Melbourne: Oxford University Press. 2004.
- Indigenous Participation in Australian Economies: Historical and Anthropological Perspectives. Canberra: Australian National University Press. 2010.
- with N. Fijn; C. Lloyd; M. Pickering, eds. (2012). Indigenous Participation in Australian Economies II: Historical Engagements and Current Enterprises. Canberra: Australian National University Press.
- with P. McConvell; R. Hendery, eds. (2013). Kinship Systems: Change and Reconstruction. Salt Lake City: University of Utah Press.
- "Foragers or Farmers: Dark Emu and the Controversy over Aboriginal Agriculture". Anthropological Forum. 31 (1): 106–128. 2021. doi:10.1080/00664677.2020.1861538. ISSN 0066-4677. S2CID 232765674. (evaluates Bruce Pascoe's book Dark Emu)

== Notes ==
Citations

Sources

- Keen, Ian (n.d.). "Biography". iankeen.net. Archived from the original on 2 February 2021.
- Lātūkefu, Ruth A. (June 1989). "Review: Being Black: Aboriginal cultures in 'settled' Australia by Ian Keen". The Journal of the Polynesian Society. 98 (2): 224–227. JSTOR 20706278.
- Myers, Fred R. (December 1995). "Review: Knowledge and Secrecy in an Aboriginal Religion: Yolngu of North-EastArnhem Land by Ian Keen". Oceania. 66 (2): 159–161. doi:10.1002/j.1834-4461.1995.tb02542.x. JSTOR 40331483.
- Peterson, Nicolas (2015). "Foreword". In Toner, P. G. (ed.). Strings of Connectedness: Essays in honour of Ian Keen. Australian National University Press. pp. xix–xxiv. ISBN 978-1-925-02263-6. JSTOR j.ctt183q3jp.7.
- Toner, P. G. (2015). "Introduction:Strings of Connectedness in Ian Keen's Scholarship". In Toner, P. G. (ed.). Strings of Connectedness: Essays in honour of Ian Keen. Australian National University Press. pp. 1–26. ISBN 978-1-925-02263-6. JSTOR j.ctt183q3jp.8.
