= Kuninjku dialect =

Australian Aboriginal language

Kuninjku
- Native to: Australia
- Region: Northern Territory
- Ethnicity: Bininj
- Native speakers: 423 (2021 census)
- Language family: Arnhem: Gunwinyguan; Gunwinggic; Bininj Kunwok; Kuninjku

Language codes
- ISO 639-3: –
- Glottolog: mura1269
- AIATSIS: N173 Kuninjku

Kuninjku is a dialect of Bininj Kunwok, an Australian Aboriginal language. The Aboriginal people who speak Kuninjku are the Bininj people, who live primarily in western Arnhem Land. Kuninjku is spoken primarily in the east of the Bininj Kunwok speaking areas, particularly the outstations of Maningrida such as Mumeka, Marrkolidjban, Mankorlod, Barrihdjowkkeng, Kakodbebuldi, Kurrurldul and Yikarrakkal.
