= Burarra language =

Australian Aboriginal language

Burarra
- Region: Northern Territory
- Ethnicity: Burarra, Gadjalivia
- Native speakers: 1,229 (2021 census)
- Language family: Arnhem?: Maningrida; Burarra
- Dialects: Gun-narta (Gidjingaliya, Anbarra); Gun-nartpa (Gudjarlabiya); Gun-narda (Martay)

Language codes
- ISO 639-3: bvr
- Glottolog: bura1267
- AIATSIS: N82
- ELP: Burarra

The Burarra language is an Australian Aboriginal language spoken by the Burarra people of Arnhem Land. It has several dialects.

Other names and spellings include Barera, Bawera, Burada, Bureda, Burera, An-barra (Anbarra), Gidjingaliya, Gu-jingarliya, Gu-jarlabiya, Gun-Guragone (also used for Guragone), Jikai, Tchikai.

The Djangu people have a Burarra clan, which is sometimes confused with this language.

== Classification ==
Burarra is a prefixing non-Pama-Nyungan language. Along with Gurr-goni, it makes up the Burarran branch of the Maningrida language family (which also includes Ndjébbana and Na-kara).

== Distribution ==
The Burarra people are from the Blyth and Cadell River regions of Central and North-central Arnhem Land, but many now reside further west in Maningrida township at the mouth of the Liverpool River.

== Dialects ==
Glasgow (1994) distinguishes three dialects of Burarra: Gun-nartpa (Mu-golarra / Mukarli group from the Cadell River region), Gun-narta (An-barra, western side of the mouth of the Blythe River), and Gun-narda (Martay, eastern side of the Blythe River). These dialect names derive from each dialect's word for the demonstrative "that". She further notes that the two latter dialects (Gun-narta and Gun-narda) are frequently grouped together and referred to by their eastern neighbours as "Burarra", and by themselves as "Gu-jingarliya" ('language'/'with tongue').

Green (1987) distinguishes two dialects: Gun-nartpa and Burarra (Gu-jingarliya), but notes that noticeable dialectal differences exist within the group of Burarra speakers.

== Phonology ==
=== Consonants ===
Consonants
		Labial	Alveolar	Retroflex	Palatal	Velar
Plosive	fortis	p	t	ʈ	c	k
Plosive	lenis	b	d	ɖ	ɟ	g
Nasal		m	n	ɳ	ɲ	ŋ
Lateral			l	ɭ		
Rhotic			r	ɻ		
Glide		w			j	

In most cases, fortis and lenis refers to the voicing in consonants where fortis is voiceless and lenis is voiced. In this case, plosives are distinguished by intra-oral peak pressure and stricture duration. Fortis consonants are usually longer in duration and have a greater intra-oral pressure while lenis consonants can often be pronounced as fricatives or approximants. The Burarra language also allows for the clustering of consonants.

=== Vowels ===
Burara has a five vowel system.

Vowel chart
	Front	Central	Back
Close	i		u
Open-mid	æ~ɛ		ɔ
Open	æ~ɛ	a	

The vowels can be realized as:

- /i/: [e] or [ɪ]
- /a/: [ä], [ɐ] or [ə]
- /æ/: [æ], [ɛ] or [e]
- /ɔ/: [ɔ] or [o]
- /u/: [ə], [ɔ̞], [ö̞], or [ʊ]

== Grammar ==
Burarra is a prefixing, multiple-classifying language. Verbs co-reference their subjects and objects through the use of prefixes, and inflect for tense and status. Serial verbs can be used to express categories like aspect, compound action and causation.

Nouns inflect for case and belong to one of four noun classes (an-, jin-, mun- and gun-).
