= Maningrida languages =

Languages of the Northern Territory

Maningrida
- Burarran
- Geographic distribution: Northern Territory
- Linguistic classification: Macro-Gunwinyguan?: Maningrida
- Subdivisions: Guragone; Burarra; Ndjebbana; Nakkara

Language codes
- Glottolog: mani1293 (Maningrida)
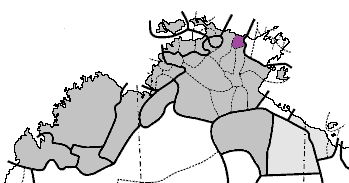
- Maningrida languages (purple), among other non-Pama-Nyungan languages (grey)

Maningrida, also known as Burarran, is a small family of Australian Aboriginal languages spoken in northern Australia. It includes four languages, none closely related:

- Burarra
- Gurr-goni
- Ndjébbana
- Na'kara

Green established the family by reconstructing the tense–aspect–mood inflections of Proto-Maningrida, and demonstrated common developments that set them apart from other Arnhem languages.

== Vocabulary ==
Capell (1942) lists the following basic vocabulary items for the Maningrida languages. Gunavidji and Bunarra are from Capell (1940).

gloss	Gungorogone	Gudjälavia	Gunaidbe	Burera	Nagara	Gunavidji	Bunarra
man	wari	angigälije	angigälije	angigälije	wunigalaia	jiːdja	biːn, ŋanbe
woman	gami	gamu	gamu	gamu	nawaɽa	ŋaɽaːm	djulumu
head	ŋɔrɔŋɔrɔ	bama	bama	bama	magar	juwuŋga	waːlu
eye	mebele	miːbele	miːbele	miːbele	guɽbara	diːli	mil
nose	goi	guje	ŋoira	ŋoira	lombara	maŋu	djirdji
mouth	ŋaɽa	ŋane	ŋane	ŋana	ŋaɽa	djäbara	lira
tongue	ŋaɽa	ŋaɭ	ŋaɭ	ŋaɭa	ŋadabirbir	djäŋɔl	djälaṉ
stomach	gɔdjaŋa	ŋaburba	ŋaburba	gɔidjila	gunar	djälema	munda
bone	gadjäldi	ŋumama	ŋumama	munmama	namoːma	ida	gidji
blood	gɔːlidja	maɳiŋan	maɳiŋan	maɳiŋan, mangaraba	nagumbala	ganbiliːbala	gindjil
kangaroo	ganajala	gandejala	gandejala	gonobolo	bälmänindja	gudjbara	wawiri
opossum	waraːgun	waːragun	waːragun	waːragun	gurbarabulgaga	malada	djaŋana
emu	buɽar			wurbaɳ			
crow	ŋaːridje	wagwag	wagwag	ma'rälgara	wagwag	ŋainjauŋanj	guɽaŋan
fly	mɔːji	jumuɖbi	jumuɖbi	mɔːja	namɔːnj	manjimiːndja	ŋurin
sun	djinmurga	maɳŋa	maɳŋa	maɳŋa	nabɛn	warwara	djiːla
moon	ŋɔlgɔwar	ŋandjireɖa	ŋandjireɖa	ɽangu	wunuŋurabildbilaga	digilgara	jälŋan
fire	gunŋudja	bɔːl	bɔːl	bɔːl	nadjɔːga	juwija	waɭu
smoke	ginɛlɛ	djolŋo	djolŋo	djolŋo	nawuːra	gɔlɔŋandjara	ŋandjur
water	gunmɛnaŋ	djidjurog	bugulo	bugulo	goga	gaːba	ŋaba

== Sources ==
- Green, Rebecca (2003). "Proto-Maningrida within Proto-Arnhem: evidence from verbal inflectional suffixes" (PDF). In Evans, Nioholas (ed.). The non-Pama-Nyungan languages of northern Australia: comparative studies of the continent's most linguistically complex region. Research School of Pacific and Asian Studies. pp. 369–424. ISBN 0-85883-5-3-8-X.
- Koch, Harold (2004). "A Merthodological History of Australian Linguistic Classification". In Bowern, Claire; Koch, Harold (eds.). Australian Languages: Classification and the Comparative Method. John Benjamins Publishing. pp. 17–. ISBN 978-9-027-24761-2.
