= Nakkara language =

Maningrida language spoken in Australia

Nakkara
- Region: Northern Territory
- Ethnicity: Nagara people
- Native speakers: 55 (2021 census)
- Language family: Macro-Gunwinyguan: Maningrida; Nakkara

Language codes
- ISO 639-3: nck
- Glottolog: naka1260
- AIATSIS: N80
- ELP: Nakara

Nakkara (Na-kara) is an Australian Aboriginal language spoken by the Nagara people of Arnhem Land in the Northern Territory of Australia.

It is also spelled Nakara or Nagara and also called Kokori.

== Phonology ==
=== Consonants ===
Consonant chart
	Bilabial	Apical		Laminal	Dorsal
	Bilabial	Alveolar	Retroflex	Palatal	Velar
Stop	b	d	ɖ	ɟ	g
Nasal	m	n	ɳ	ɲ	ŋ
Lateral		l	ɭ		
Rhotic		r/ɾ	ɽ		
Semivowel	w			j	

Stops have both voiced and voiceless allophones, depending on their position in the word. Furthermore, a stop length variation is present, which is only contrastive in morpheme-medial positions. This can be interpreted as either gemination, or as evidence for the existence of two separate stop series, with a suprasegmental hypothesis being mostly ruled out.

The tapped and trilled allophones of /r/ are in free variation.

=== Vowels ===
Vowel chart
	Front	Central	Back
Close	i		u
Mid	e		o
Open		a	
