= Cadell and Blyth Floodplains =

Floodplain in the Northern Territory of Australia

Coordinates: 12°08′S 134°35′E

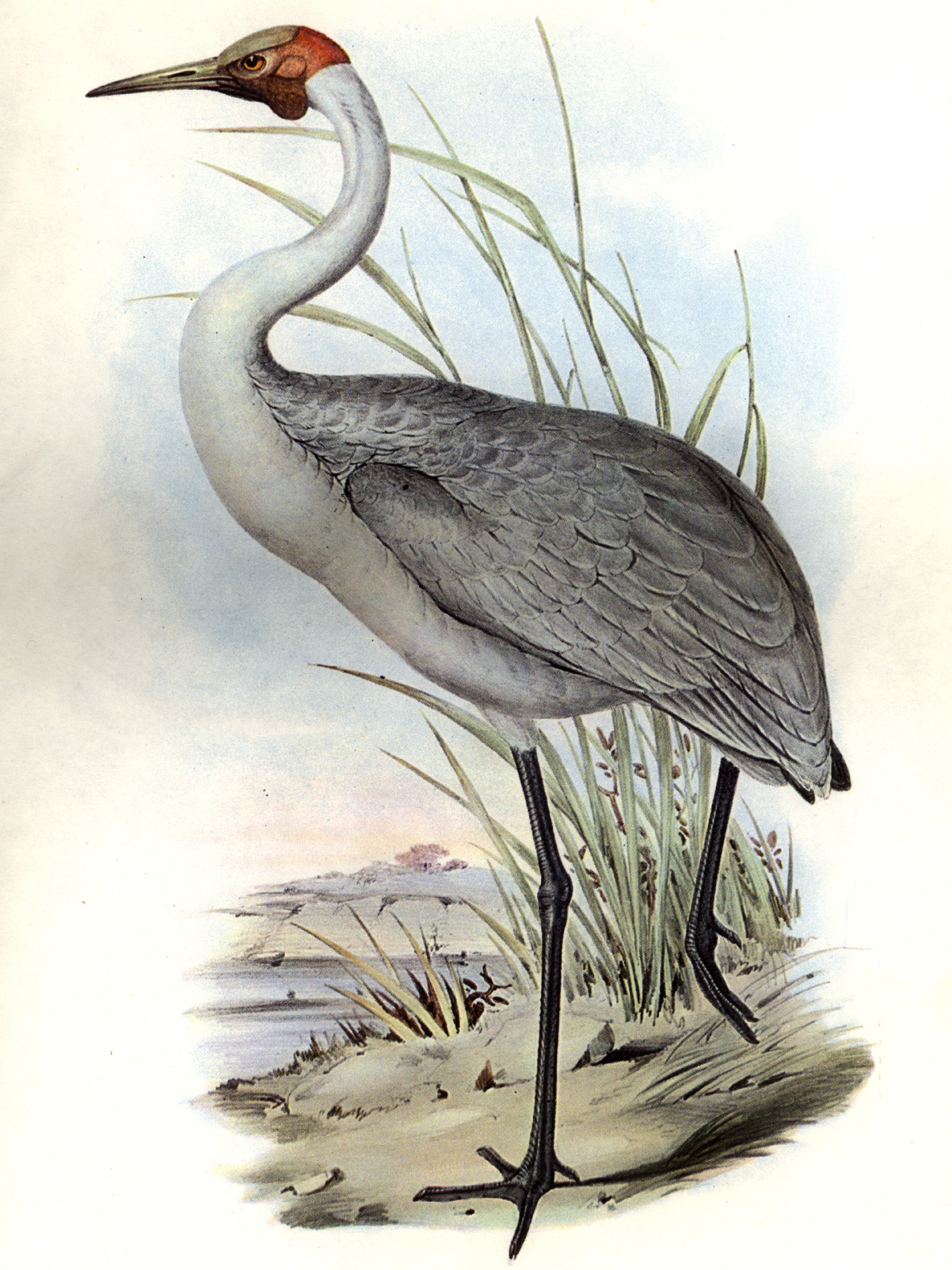
The floodplains are important for brolgas

The Cadell and Blyth Floodplains consist of the 432-square-kilometre (167 sq mi) floodplain of the lower reaches of the Blyth and Cadell Rivers of northern Arnhem Land in the Top End of the Northern Territory of Australia. It is an important site for waterbirds.

== Description ==
The combined floodplain of the Blyth and Cadell rivers meets Boucaut Bay between Milingimbi Island to the east and the Maningrida community to the west. Copious seasonal flows down the rivers inundate the floodplain with over a metre of water in wetter years. The coast of the bay is characterised by intertidal mud, sand and salt flats as well as mangroves, while the riverine plain is fringed by paperbark forests and woodlands. Land tenure is traditionally owned Aboriginal land.

== Birds ==
The floodplain, with the adjoining coast of Boucaut Bay, has been identified as an Important Bird Area (IBA) by BirdLife International because it has supported over 1% of the world populations of pied herons, brolgas and great knots. The large numbers of waders, or shorebirds, recorded at Boucaut Bay include over 1% of the world populations of great knots and pied oystercatchers. Other waterbirds using the floodplain and the mudflats of the bay in relatively large numbers include little pied cormorants, great egrets, black-tailed godwits, red-necked stints, magpie geese and whistling ducks. Asian dowitchers visit in small numbers. Chestnut rails are present. Biome-restricted passerines recorded at the site include white-gaped and bar-breasted honeyeaters, and long-tailed finches.
