= Blyth River (Northern Territory) =

Blyth
- Location of the Blyth River mouth in the Northern Territory
- Etymology: Arthur Blyth

Location
- Country: Australia
- Territory: Northern Territory
- Region: Arnhem Land

Physical characteristics
- Source
  - location: Arnhem Land, Australia
  - elevation: 194 m (636 ft)
- Mouth
  - location: Boucaut Bay, Timor Sea, Australia
  - coordinates: 12°8′45″S 134°35′20″E
  - elevation: 0 m (0 ft)
- Length: 175 km (109 mi)
- Basin size: 9,219 km^{2} (3,559 sq mi)
- Discharge
  - average: 58.9 m^{3}/s (2,080 cu ft/s)

Basin features
- Tributaries
  - left: Shadforth Creek, Saddlers Creek, Immibar Creek, Cadell River
  - right: Guyuyu Creek, Rangaburu Creek

The Blyth River is a river in the Northern Territory, Australia.

== Course and features ==
The headwaters rise east of Shadforth Hills and flows in a northerly direction through mostly uninhabited country, past the small community of Gamardi before discharging into Boucaut Bay.

The catchment occupies an area of 9,219 square kilometres (3,559 sq mi) and is situated between the Liverpool River catchment to the west, the Goyder River catchment to the east and the Roper River catchment to the south. It has a mean annual outflow of 1,860 gigalitres (2.433×10^{9} cu yd),

The Cadell and Blyth Floodplains are located at the lower reaches of the river and occupy an area of 432 square kilometres (167 sq mi).

The estuary formed at the river mouth is tidal in nature and in near pristine condition.

== History ==
The river was named by Francis Cadell in 1867 after the Premier of South Australia, Arthur Blyth.

David Lindsay charted the river in 1883 during his expedition of Arnhem Land.

== Fauna ==
Many species of fish are found in the river including sailfin glassfish, Macleay's glassfish, barred grunter, fly-specked hardyhead and pennyfish, goby, flathead goby, giant gudgeon, empire gudgeon, threadfin rainbowfish, barramundi, diamond mullet, rainbowfish, western rainbowfish, black-banded rainbowfish, chequered rainbowfish, bony bream, black catfish, Rendahl's catfish, seven-spot archerfish.

== See also ==
- List of rivers of Australia § Northern Territory
