= List of Australian Aboriginal languages =

Indigenous Australian languages

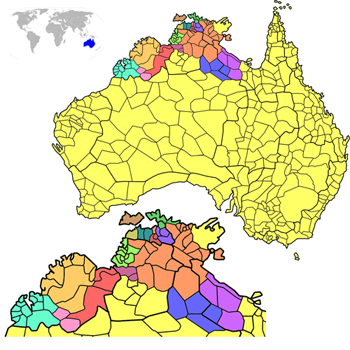
A language map, different colours represent different language families: Greater Pama–Nyungan; Laragiya; Tiwi; Bunaban; Daly; Limilngan; Djeragan; Nyulnyulan; Wororan; Yirram; West Barkly; Yiwaidjan; Giimbiyu; Umbugarla; Gunwinyguan; Garawan

There are numerous Australian Aboriginal languages and dialects, many of which are endangered. An endangered language is one that it is at risk of falling out of use, generally because it has few surviving speakers. If it loses all of its native speakers, it becomes an extinct language.

UNESCO defines four levels of language endangerment between "safe" (not endangered) and "extinct":

- Vulnerable
- Definitely endangered
- Severely endangered
- Critically endangered

== List ==
Language	Alternative names	Speakers	Status	Notes
Adithinngithigh language	Adetingiti		Extinct	Cape York Peninsula, Queensland. Unwritten language.
Adnyamathanha language	Ad'n'amadana, Anjimatana, Anjiwatana	110 (2006)	Severely endangered	SA R. M. W. Dixon classifies Adnyamathanha and Guyani as a single language. Ethnologue treats them as separate, and so they each have their own ISO 639-3 codes. They are traditional languages of the Adnyamathanha of and the Kuyani peoples, of the Flinders Ranges and to the west of the Flinders respectively, in South Australia.
Aghu Tharrnggala language	Aghu wititit		Extinct	Cape York Peninsula, Queensland
Alawa language		5 (2021)	Moribund	Roper River, Arnhem Land, Northern Territory
Alngith dialect			Extinct	Cape York Peninsula, Queensland
Alyawarre language	Alyawarr	1660	Developing	Northern Territory - one of the Arrernte language group
Amarag language, Amurdag language		Charlie Mungulda	Extinct	Goulburn Island, Northern Territory. Considered extinct in the 2016 census but Mungulda's death was not reported, even coauthoring a paper in 2020.
Ami language		5	Moribund	Daly River, Northern Territory
Andajin language		2	Nearly extinct	Kimberley region, Western Australia; may be considered a dialect of Ngarinyin language, which is one of the Worrorran languages
Andegerebinha language	Andigibinha, Antekerrepinhe, Andegerebenha, Antekerrepenhe	0 (2016)	Dormant	Northern Territory, Hay River, Pituri Creek area, east of Alyawarra. One of the Arrernte language group
Anguthimri language	Awngthim, Paman languages		Extinct	Cape York Peninsula, Queensland
Anindilyakwa language	Enindhilyagwa	4100	Vulnerable	Groote Eylandt and Bickerton Island in the Gulf of Carpentaria in the Northern Territory
Anmatyerre language		640 (2016)	Developing	NT. One of the Arrernte language group
Antakirinya language, Antakarinya language		6	Critically endangered	SA
Arabana language		21	Critically endangered	SA
Areba language			Extinct	Cape York Peninsula, Queensland
Aritinngithigh language			Extinct	Cape York Peninsula, Queensland
Arrernte language	Upper Arrernte, Aranda, Arunta, Arrarnta	1,910 Central/Eastern Arrernte; 1,550 Alywarra; other dialects fewer or 0.	Vulnerable	Alice Springs region NT Eastern, Western and Southern; comprises a group of dialects
Atampaya language			Extinct	Cape York Peninsula, Queensland
Australian Aboriginal English		Over 30,000	Vigorous	Developed post-contact
Australian Aboriginal Pidgin English language		Few	Nearly extinct	Pidgin. Developed post-contact. Has been mostly creolized.
Australian Kriol language	Creole, Pidgin English, Roper-Bamyili Creole	4,200	Vigorous	WA, NT & Qld developed post-contact. 10, 000 second language speakers.
Awabakal language	Awabakal	9	Dormant	NSW. Being revived. Was considered extinct.
Ayabadhu language, Ayapathu language			Extinct	Cape York Peninsula, Queensland
Badimaya language	Widimaya, Parti-Maya	3	Nearly extinct	WA
Bandjigali language		4 to 22	Moribund	NSW
Banjima language, Panytyima language		50 to 100	Moribund	WA
Bardi language	Baadi, Badi, Ba:di, Baardi, Bard	20 to 150	Moribund	WA
Barngarla language	Bangala, Banggala, Banggarla, Bungeha, Bungela, Pakarla, Pangkala, Pankalla, Parnkala, Parnkalla, Punkalla		Extinct	SA
Barrow Point language			Extinct	Qld
Bayungu language		2	Nearly extinct	WA
Bidyara language, Bidjara language	Bithara, Bitjara		Extinct	Qld
Broome Pearling Lugger Pidgin	Broom Creole, Japanese Pidgin English, Koepang Talk, Malay Talk	40	Moribund	WA Developed post-contact, second language speakers only.
Bundjalung language, Bandjalang language		100	Shifting	NSW
Bunuba language	Bunaba, Bunapa, Punapa	40 to 110	Moribund	WA
Bunurong language			Extinct	Vic
Burduna language	Boordoona, Bootena, Boruna, Budina, Budoona, Buduna, Bu-tena, Poodena, Poordoona, Purduma, Purduna		Extinct	WA
Damin language	Demiin		Extinct	Initiation language for men. Qld
Darkinjung language	Darginjang, Darginyung, Darkinjang, Darkinoong, Darkinung, Darkinyun, Darkinyung, Darknung		Extinct	NSW
Dharawal language	Dharawaal, Thurrawal, Thurawal, Turrubul		Extinct	NSW
Dhargari language		1	Nearly extinct	WA
Dharug language	Daruk, Dharruk, Dharuk, Dharug, Darug		Extinct	NSW
Dhauwurdwurung language	Gunditjmara		Extinct	Vic
Dhurga language			Extinct	NSW
Dirari language			Extinct	SA
Diyari language	Dieri	13 (2006)	Nearly extinct	Karnic, SA. Program in place to teach and increase usage.
Djabwurung language	Tjap-wurrung		Extinct	Vic
Djangun language			Extinct	Qld
Djawi language, Jawi language	Chowie, Djau, Dyawi		Extinct	WA
Djinang language		100 to 230	Vigorous	Yolŋu languages
Djiringanj language			Extinct	SE NSW
Djiwarli language, Jiwarli language	Djiwali, Djwarli, Guwari, Jiwali, Kuwari, Tci-warli, Tjiwarli		Extinct	WA
Doolboong language	Duulngari, Tulpung		Extinct	WA
Dungidjau language			Extinct	Qld
Dyaabugay language, Djabugay language	Djabugai, Dyabugay, Tjapukai	28	Moribund	Qld
Dyaberdyaber language, Djabirr-Djabirr language	Djaberdjaber, Djaber-Djaber, Jabirr-Jabirr, Jabirrjabirr		Extinct	WA
Dyangadi language			Extinct	NSW
Dyirbal language		15 to 28	Moribund	Qld
Dyugun language, Djugun language	Djugan, Djukan, Jookoon		Extinct	WA
Eora language	Iora		Extinct	NSW
Erre language			Extinct	NT
Flinders Island language			Extinct	Yalgawarra language
Gaagudju language, Gagadu language		6	extinct	NT
Gajerrong language, Gadjerawang language, Gajirrabeng language	Gadjerong, Gadyerong, Gajirrawoong, Kajirrawung	3	Critically endangered	WA & NT
Gambera language	Gambere, Gamberre, Gambre, Gamgre, Guwan, Kambera	6		WA
Gamilaraay language	Camileroi, Gamilaroi, Kamilaroi, Yuwaalaraay, Wallarai	105 (2016)	Critically endangered	NSW. It is being revived.
Ganggalidda language, Ganggalida language		5	Critically endangered	Qld, NT
Garawa language		40 to 87 speakers		NT
Garig-Ilgar language		4 (2003 N Evans); Population includes 3 Ilgar, 1 Garig		NT
Giyug language		2		NT
Gooniyandi language	Gunian, Guniandi, Guniyan, Guniyandi, Guniyn, Konejandi, Koneyandi, Kunan, Kunian, Kuniyan	100 (1990 Schmidt)	Severely endangered	WA
Gudanji language		3		NT
Gugadj language	Kukatj	1		Qld
Gugu Badhun language		2		Qld
Gugubera language, Koko-Bera language, Koko Bera language	Kok Kaber, Kok-Kaper, Kukubera	15 (1991 SIL) 50 (1990 Schmidt)	Severely endangered	Qld
Guguyimidjir language, Guugu Yimithirr language, Guugu Yimidhirr language	Gogo-Yimidjir, Gugu-Gugu Yimijir, Gugu Yimithirr, Koko Imudji, Koko Yimidir, Kuku Jimidir, Kuku Kuku Yimithirr, Kukuyimidir	20 to 30 (1991 Wayne Rosendale); 200 to 300 know and understand the language but prefer English; 400 (1990 Schmidt)	Vulnerable	Qld
Gumbaynggirr language, Kumbainggar language		10 (2000)	Critically endangered	NSW
Gundungurra language	Gandangara			NSW
Gungabula language		2		Qld
Gunin language	Cuini, Kunan, Goonan, Gunan, Gwini, Gwiini			WA
Gunya language		3		Qld
Gupapuyngu language	Gobabingo, Gubabwingu	330	Vulnerable	NT
Gurindji Kriol language	Gurindji children's language, Gurinji children's language			NT. Developed post-contact
Gurrgoni language, Guragone language		20 (1990 Schmidt)	Vulnerable	NT
Guwamu language		1		Qld
Guwij language	Guidj, Guwidj			WA
Iwaidja language		130	Vulnerable	NT
Jaminjung language Djamindjung language	Djamindjung	27 to 130	Severely endangered	NT
Jardwadjali language				Vic
Jaru language	Djaru, Jaroo, Tjaru	350		WA
Jawoyn language		20 to 42	Severely endangered	NT
Jingulu language, Djingili language		10 (1997)	Severely endangered	Pama–Nyungan languages, Barkly. NT
Jurruru language	Chooraroo, Churoro, Djuroro, Jururu, Thuraru, Tjuroro, Tjurruru, Tjururu			WA
Kabi Kabi language	Gabi Gabi, Kabi Kabi, Dippil			Qld
Kalau Lagau Ya	Kala Lagaw Ya, Kalaw Lagaw Ya, Kalau Kawau Ya, Kalaw Kawau Ya, Lagau Ya	700 to 1200		Qld
Kalaamaya language	Galamai, Galamaya, Jaburu, Kaburn, Kalamaia, Kelamai, Natingero, Njindango, Takalako			WA
Kalaku language	Gala:gu, Galaagu, Kaburn, Kalaaku, Kalako, l, Kalarko, Kallaar, Kallaargu, Karlaku, Malba, Malpa, Marlba			WA
Kamu language		2 (1967)		NT
Kaniyang language	Ganajang, Kaneang, Kaniyan, Kunyung			WA
Kanju language, Kaantju language	Gandanju, Gandju, Kaantyu, Kamdhue, Kandju, Kandyu, Kanyu, Karnu	50		Qld
Karajarri language, Karadjeri language	Garadjari, Garadjeri, Garadjiri, Garadyari, Gard'are, Guradjara, Karrajarri	12 (1991 SIL)	Critically endangered	WA
Kariyarra language	Gariera, Kaierra, Kariara, Kariera, Karriara, Karriarra, Kariyara, Kyeara			WA
Kaurna language			Critically endangered	SA
Kawarrangg language				Qld
Kayardild language	Gajadilt, Gajardild, Gayadilt, Gayardild, Gayardilt, Kaiadilt, Malununda	6 (2000 Evans) 150	Critically endangered	Tangkic. Qld, Bentinck Island
Kija language	Gidja, Kidja, Kitja, Lunga, Lungga	210	Severely endangered	WA
Kokata language		3		Western Desert Language
Kok-Nar language	Kok Narr			Qld
Kukatja language	Gogodja, Gugadja, Gugudja, Kukaja		Vulnerable	WA
Kuku Thaypan language		2		Qld
Kuku Yalanji language	Gugu Guguyalanji, Koko-Yalangi		Severely endangered	Qld
Kuku-Mangk language		1	Extinct	Cape York Peninsula, Queensland
Kuku-Mu'inh language		7		Cape York Peninsula, Queensland
Kuku-Muminh language		31		Cape York Peninsula, Queensland
Kuku-Ugbanh language		6		Cape York Peninsula, Queensland
Kuku-Uwanh language		40		Cape York Peninsula, Queensland
Kullili language	Kullila, Galili			Qld
Kuluwarrang language	Guluwarin, Kuluwarin			WA
Kunbarlang language		50 to 100 (1983 Black)	Severely endangered	NT
Kunggara language		10 (1971 SIL)		Cape York Peninsula, Queensland
Kunggari language		10		Qld
Kunja language				Qld
Kunjen language		20 to 25 (1991 Bruce Sommer); 40 with some knowledge 300 (1991 Bruce Sommer)	Critically endangered	Cape York Peninsula, Queensland
Kunwinjku language		1200 to 2000	Vulnerable	NT
Kurrama language	Gurama, Karama, Karima, Kerama, Korama, Korima, Kurama	50	Critically endangered	WA
Kurtjar language, Gurdjar language	Kurtjjar, Kurrtjar	30	Extinct	Qld
Kuthant language		3		Qld
Kuuk Thaayorre language	Gugudayor, Kuktayor, Kukudayore, Kuuk Thaayoore, Kuuk Taior, Thaayore, Thayore, Thayorre	24	Definitely endangered	Qld
Kuuku Ya'u language	Koko-Ja'o, Kokoyao, Kuuku-Ya'u, Ya'o		Critically endangered	Qld
Kuurinji language, Gurindji language	Gurinji, Kuurrinyji	225 to 900	Definitely endangered	NT
Kuyani language	Guyani, Kijani, Kwiani			SA extinct. R. M. W. Dixon classifies Adnyamathanha and Guyani as a single language. Ethnologue treats them as separate, and so they each have their own ISO 639-3 codes
Lairmairrener language				Central Tas
Lamu-Lamu language		1		Qld
Laragia language		6 (1983 Black)		NT
Lardil language	Leerdil	2 (2000 Evans)	Critically endangered	Qld moribund
Larrakia language		29		NT
Limilngan language		3		NT
Linngithigh language	Leningitij, Linngithig			Qld
Lower Burdekin languages				Qld
Luthigh language				Qld
Matngele language, Madngele language		15 to 20 (1983 Black), 10 (estimate fieldwork 2013)	Critically endangered	NT
Malgana language	Malngin, Maljanna, Maldjana, Malkana			WA
Malyangaba language	Maljangapa, Maljangpa, Maljangaba, Malya-napa, Mullia-arpa, Mulya-napa, Mulya-nappa, Malynapa, Maljapa, Malyapa, Karikari, Bulali			SA
Manda language		25 (1983 Black)		NT
Mandandanyi language		1		Qld
Mangarla language, Mangala language	Manala, Mangalaa, Maŋala, Minala	63	Critically endangered	WA
Mangarrayi language, Mangarayi language		50 (1983 Black)	Critically endangered	NT
Mangerr language		1		NT
Mara language, Marra language		15 (1991 M Sharpe)		NT
Maranunggu language		15 to 20 (1983 Black)		NT
Margany language		1		Qld
Maridan language		20		NT
Marimanindji language		15 (1983 Black)		NT
Maringarr language		30 to 40 (1983 Black)	Critically endangered	NT
Mariyedi language		20		NT
Marrgu language, Margu language		1 (2000 Evans)	Extinct	NT
Marrisyefin language, Maridjabin language		20 (1970 Oates)	Critically endangered	NT
Marrithiyel language, Marithiel language		25 (1983 Black)	Critically endangered	NT
Marti Ke language		10 (2001 Alexander) 100		NT
Martuwangka language			Vulnerable	WA
Martuyhunira language, Martuthunira language	Maratunia, Mardadhunira, Mardathon, Mardathoni, Mardathoonera, Mardatuna, Mardatunera, Mardudhoonera, Mardudhunera, Mardudhunira, Mardudjungara, Marduduna, Mardudunera, Marduthunira, Mardutunera, Mardutunira, Marduyunira, Martuthinya, and	5		WA extinct
Maung language		260	Vulnerable	NT
Maya language (Australia)	Maia, Maja			WA
Mayaguduna language		2		Cape York Peninsula, Queensland
Mbabaram language	Barbaram	2		Qld
Mbara language (Australia)				Qld
Mbariman-Gudhinma language		3		Qld
Mbiywom language				Qld
Meriam Mir language		160 to 210	Definitely endangered	Qld
Miriwoong language, Miriwung language		10 to 20 (1990 Schmidt)	Critically endangered	WA
Miwa language	Bagu, Miwi, Pela	4		WA
Mpakwithi dialect				Qld
Mpalityanh language				Qld
Mudburra language, Mudbura language		50 (1983 Black)	Severely endangered	NT
MalakMalak, MullukMulluk		9 to 11 (1988 SIL), 11 (estimate fieldwork 2013)	Severely endangered	NT
Muluridyi language		1		Qld
Munumburru language	Munumburu			WA
Muruwari language	Muruwarri, Murawari, Murawarri	1		Qld
Nakkara language		50 (2006)	Severely endangered	Arnhem Land, NT
Nauo language	Nawu, Nhawu, Nawo, Njao		Extinct	Eyre Peninsula, South Australia
Ndjébbana language	Djeebbana, Kunibidji, Gunavidji, Gunivugi, Gombudj	240 (2006)	Endangered	Liverpool River, Arnhem Land, NT
Ngaanyatjarra language		700 to 1000 (2006)	Vulnerable	Shire of Ngaanyatjarraku, Western Australia
Ngaatjatjara language	Ngaatjatjara, Ngaadadjarra	12 (2005)	Moribund	Shire of Ngaanyatjarraku, Western Australia
Ngadjunmaya language		10, 0 (2007)	Extinct	Goldfields-Esperance, WA
Ngadjuri language			Extinct	SA
Ngalakan language		10, 0 (2004)	Extinct	Roper River, Northern Territory
Ngaliwuru language	Jaminjung	27 to 130 (2006)	Critically endangered	Victoria River (Northern Territory)
Ngalkbun language, Dalabon language	Buin, Boun, Buan, Bouin, Buwan, Dangbon, Gundangbon, Ngalabon, Ngalkbon, Nalabon	15 (2006)	Moribund	Arnhem Land, Northern Territory
Ngamini language		2	Extinct	SA
Ngandi language		9 (2006)	Critically endangered	NT
Ngan'gityemerri language	Ngan.gi-tjemerri, Nangikurrunggurr	110 to 180	Endangered	Daly River, NT
Ngardi language	Ngadi, Narti, Ngati	10 to 14 (2006)	Moribund	NT, WA
Ngarigo language	Ngarigu		Moribund by early 20th C, now extinct.	Centred on Monaro region NSW, ACT, VIC
Ngarinman language		592 (2006)	Severely endangered	Northern Territory
Ngarinyin language	Ungarinjin, Eastern Worrorran		Moribund	Northern Kimberley, WA
Ngarla language		8 (1991), 0 (2015); 10 partial speakers	Extinct	Port Hedland, WA
Ngarluma language	Gnalluma, Gnalooma, Gnalouma, Ngallooma, Ngalluma, Ngalooma, Ngaluma	11 to 42 (2006)	Critically endangered	WA
Ngarnawu language	Ngarnaw	56 to 58 (2009)	Moribund	Northern Kimberley, WA
Ngarnka language	Pama–Nyungan languages		Extinct	Barkly Tableland, Northern Territory
Ngawun language		1	Extinct	Cape York Peninsula, Queensland
Ngkoth language			Extinct	Qld
Ngumbarl language	Ngoombarl, Ngormbal, Ngumbal		Extinct	WA
Ngunawal language	Ngunnawal, Burragorang, Gundungurra		Extinct	NSW/ACT
Ngurmbur language		1	Extinct	Arnhem Land, Northern Territory
Nhanta language	Nhanda	"A Handful" (2001)	Moribund	WA
Nhuwala language	Ngoala, Noala, Noalla, Nooela, Nuela	No L1 Speakers	Dormant	WA
Nijadali language	Nyiyaparli	3 (2006)	Moribund	WA
Nimanbur language		2	Extinct	Dampier Peninsula. WA
Ntra'ngith language			Extinct	Cape York Peninsula, Queensland
Nuenonne language	Nyunoni		Extinct	SE Tas
Nungali language		2	Extinct	Daly River, Northern Territory
Nunggubuyu language		272 (2016)	Severely endangered	Numbulwar, Northern Territory
Nyamal language	Gnamo, Namel, Njamal, Njamarl, Nyamel	20 to 34 (2006)	Severely endangered	Pilbara, WA
Nyangga language	Yukulta	1	Extinct	Queensland & Northern Territory
Nyangumarta language		250 to 310	Vulnerable	WA
Nyawaygi language			Extinct	NE Queensland
Nyikina language, Nyigina language		20 to 68 (2006)	Severely endangered	Fitzroy River, WA
Nyininy language	Njining, Njininj, Nyinin	350 (2006)	Endangered	WA
Nyulnyul language	Njul-Njul, Nyol-Nyol, Nyoolnyool, Nyul Nyul		Extinct	WA
Nyungar language	Noongar	232 (dialects 8,000)	Endangered	WA
Okunjan language	Ogh-Undjan, Ogondyan	2 (2005)	Moribund	Cape York Peninsula, Queensland
Paakantyi language, Darling language	Baagandji, Kula, Pama–Nyungan	4 to 22 (2006)	Critically endangered	Darling River, NSW
Pakanha language		No L1 speakers (2007 Wurm)	Dormant	Cape York Peninsula, Queensland
Paredarerme language			Extinct	Tas
Peerapper language			Extinct	Tas
Peramangk language	Poonawatta, Tarrawatta, Karrawatta, Yira-Ruka, Wiljani, Mutingengal, Runganng, Jolori, Pongarang, Paldarinalwar, Merelda.		Descendants still exist	Adelaide Hills, SA
Pini language		10	Moribund	Western Desert language
Pinigura language	Dhalandji	6 (2005)	Moribund	WA
Pintupi language		203	Vulnerable	NT, WA
Pitjantjatjara language		2700	Vulnerable	NT, SA, WA
Pitta Pitta language		2	Extinct	Boulia, Queensland
Plangermaireener language			Extinct	Tas
Popham Bay language	Wurrugu		Extinct	NT
Pyemmairre language			Extinct	Tas
Rembarrnga language		10 to 38 (2006)	Critically endangered	Roper River, NT
Ritharrngu language		32 (2006)	Critically endangered	Northern Territory
Tharkarri language		20	Critically endangered	Pilbara, WA
Thaua language	Thoorga, Durga, Dhurga		Extinct	South Coast of NSW
Thiin language			Extinct	WA
Tiwi language		1700	Vulnerable	Tiwi Islands
Tommeginne language			Extinct	NNW Tas
Toogee language			Extinct	SW Tas
Tyaraity language		8 (2015)	Moribund	Daly River, Northern Territory
Tyerremotepanner language			Extinct	NNE Tas
Umbindhamu language		6	Extinct	Cape York Peninsula, Queensland
Umbugarla language		3	Extinct	Arnhem Land, NT
Umbuygamu language		7	Extinct	Queensland
Umiida language	Umida, Umi:da	4 to 22 (2005)	Moribund	WA
Umpila language		12 (2005)	Severely endangered	Cape York Peninsula, Qld
Unggarangu language	Unggarangi	4 to 22 (2005)	Moribund	WA
Unggumi language	Ungkami, Wunggumi	4 to 22 (2005)	Moribund	WA
Uradhi language		2	Extinct	Cape York Peninsula, Qld
Urningangg language	Mangerr, Giimbiyu	10 (1983 Black)	Extinct	Arnhem Land, NT
Uw Olkola language	Olkola, Olgolo, Kunjen	2 (2005)	Moribund	Cape York Peninsula, Qld
Uw Oykangand language	Oykangand, Kunjen	2 (2005)	Moribund	Cape York Peninsula, Qld
Waanyi language			Critically endangered	Garawa. Qld
Wadjiginy language		12 (1988 SIL)		NT
Wadjigu language		1		Qld
Wagaya language		10 (1983 Black)		NT
Wagiman language, Wageman language		10 (2000)	Severely endangered	NT
Wajarri language	Watjari, Watjarri, Wadjari, Wadjeri	50 (1981 W Douglas); 200 or fewer (1981 W Douglas)	Severely endangered	WA
Wakawaka language		3		Qld
Walangama language				Qld
Walbanga language				Pama–Nyungan languages, Yuin–Kuric languages, Yuin. South Coast of New South wales
Walmajarri language	Tjiwaling, Tjiwarlin	500 to 520	Definitely endangered	WA
Wambaya language		12	Critically endangered	Pama–Nyungan languages, Barkly. NT
Wamin language		1		Qld
Wandandian language				Pama–Nyungan languages, Yuin-Kuric, Yuin. South Coast of New South wales
Wangaaybuwan language, Wangaaybuwan-Ngiyambaa language		12	Critically endangered	NSW
Wangai language	Wongai or Wankai	200-300		Goldfields of Western Australia
Wanggamala language		1		NT, Qld
Wangganguru language		8		SA
Wangkajunga language	Wangkatjungka, Wonggadjunggu			WA
Wangkumara language, Ngura language	Wanggumara	6 Population includes 1 Punthamara, 4 Wongkumara, 2 Badjiri, and 1 Kalali	Critically endangered	Qld
Wanyjirra language	Wandjira, Wandjirra, Wanjira			NT
Waray language	Warray, Wulwulam (dialect), Ngorrkkowo (dialect)	4	Extinct	Adelaide River, NT
Wardaman language		50 (1983 Black)	Severely endangered	WA
Warlmanpa language		50		NT
Warlpiri language		2500	Vulnerable	NT
Warluwara language		3		Qld
Warnman language, Wanman language		20 (1973 SIL)	Severely endangered	WA
Warrgamay language		3		Qld
Warrungu language	Warrangu, Warrango			Qld
Warrwa language	Warwa, Warwar	2 (2001 McGregor)		WA
Warumungu language		50 to 310	Severely endangered	NT
Warungu language		2		Qld
Western Desert language	See article for the various dialects	7400		WA, NT & SA
Wik Me'nh language				Cape York Peninsula, Queensland
Wik Mungkan language		1050	Vulnerable	Cape York Peninsula, Queensland
Wik Ngathan language			Definitely endangered	Cape York Peninsula, Queensland
Wik-Epa language		3		Cape York Peninsula, Queensland
Wik-Iiyanh language		40		Cape York Peninsula, Queensland
Wik-Keyangan language		3		Cape York Peninsula, Queensland
Wik-Me'anha language		12		Cape York Peninsula, Queensland
Wik-Ngatharr language	Wik-Ngathara, Wik-Ngatharr, Wik-Ngatharra, Wik-Ngathrr, Wikngatara			Qld
Wikngenchera language, Wik Ngencherr language		50 (1970 Oates)	Severely endangered	Cape York Peninsula, Queensland
Wilawila language	Wila-Wila	2		WA
Winyjarrumi language	Windjarumi			WA
Wiradjuri language, Wiradhuri language		3	Critically endangered	NSW
Wirangu language	Warrangoo, Wirongu, Wironguwongga, Wirrung, Wirrunga	2		SA
Woiwurrung language	Woiwurrong, Woiworung			Pama–Nyungan languages, Kulin. Vic extinct
Wolyamidi language	Woldjamidi, Wol'jamidi, Wolyamidi			WA
Worimi language				NSW extinct
Worrorra language, Worora language		20 (1990 Schmidt)	Critically endangered	WA
Wulna language		1		NT
Wunambal language	Unambal, Wunambul	20 (1990 A Schmidt)	Critically endangered	WA
Wurla language	Ola, Worla, Wula			WA
Yandruwandha language	Yandrruwantha	2		SA & Qld
Yankunytjatjara language		70 to 560	Definitely endangered	SA
Yan-nhangu language, Jarnango language		40 (1983 Black)	Definitely endangered	NT
Yanyuwa language		70 to 130	Severely endangered	NT
Yaran language	Bindjali		Extinct	SA
Yawarawarga language	Yawarrawarrka	1		SA & Qld
Yawijibaya language	Jawdjibara, Yaudjibara, Yawjibarra			WA
Yawuru language	Jauor, Yaoro, Yawooroo	30 (2001 K Hosokawa)		WA
Yidiny language	Idin, Idindji, Idinji, Jidindji, Yetinji, Yiddinji, Yidin, Yidindji, Yidini, Yitintyi	12		Qld
Yiiji language	Jeidji, Yeidji	20 (1990 A Schmidt)	Critically endangered	WA
Yindjilandji language		1		NT
Yinggarda language	Inggarda, Ingara, Ingarda, Ingarra, Ingarrah, Inparra, Jinggarda, Yingkarta, Kakarakala	5		WA
Yinhawangka language	Inawonga, Innawonga, Inyawonga			WA
Yinwum language				Qld
Yir Yoront language		15 (1991 Bruce Sommer)	Extinct	Cape York Peninsula, Queensland
Yir-Thangedl language				Qld
Yorta Yorta language				Vic
Yukulta language	Jokula			Qld, Doomagee region
Yulparija language	Julbaridja, Julbre, Yulbaridya, Yurlparija			WA
Yuwaaliyaay language	Euahlayi, Yuwaalayaay			NSW
