= Ngarnka =

The Ngarnka, also Ngarnji or Ngewin, are an indigenous Australian people of the Northern Territory. They are often said to be the same as the Gudanji, one of whose alternative names is Ngarnji. However linguists distinguish between the language spoken by Ngarnka speakers and those who speak Gudanji.

== Name and language ==
Ngarnka is classified as one of the non Pama Nyungan Mirndi languages. The last fluent speaker died in 1997/ 1998.

Many contemporary Ngarnka regard themselves and the Wambaya as essentially the same tribal grouping, with Wambaya used as an alternative name for themselves. Linguistic research by Neil Chadwick has clarified however that that Ngarnka down to recent times (the 1970s), though genetically affiliated with Wambaya and Jingulu, was a distinct language.

== Alternative names ==
- Ngarnga
- Ngarndji
- Gudanji
- Ngewin
- Gnuin
- Leeillawarrie

== Sources ==
- "Ngarnka". Australian Institute of Aboriginal and Torres Strait Islander Studies. 26 July 2019.
- Nordlinger, Rachel (1998). A Grammar of Wambaya, Northern Territory (Australia) (PDF). Pacific Linguistics.
- Nordlinger, Rachel (2014). "Serial verbs in Wambaya". In Pensalfini, Rob; Turpin, Myfany; Guillemin, Diana (eds.). Language Description Informed by Theory. John Benjamins Publishing Company. pp. 263–281. ISBN 978-9-027-27091-7.
- Osgarby, David John (2014). Nominal morphology of Ngarnka, Northern Territory (Australia) (pdf) (Thesis). University of Queensland.
- Pensalfini, Rob (2004). "Eulogizing a language: the Ngarnka experience" (pdf). International Journal of the Sociology of Language (164): 141–156.
- Tindale, Norman Barnett (1974). "Kotandji (NT)". Aboriginal Tribes of Australia: Their Terrain, Environmental Controls, Distribution, Limits, and Proper Names. Australian National University. ISBN 978-0-708-10741-6.
