= Gudanji =

Indigenous Australian people

The Gudanji, otherwise known as the Kotandji or Ngandji, are an indigenous Australian people of the Northern Territory.

== Language ==
The Gudanji were formerly thought to speak a Ngurlun language, belonging to the eastern Mirndi languages group of non-Pama Nyungan family, one that was mutually intelligible with Wambaya and Binbinka .

== Country ==
Norman Tindale's estimate of Gudanji lands has them covering about 12,000 square miles (31,000 km^{2}), running southeast of the coastal slope at Tanumbirini to the headwaters of the McArthur River, taking in Old Wallhallow and northward, also Mallapunyah. The western extension lay about the head of Newcastle Creek, while their southern frontier ran to the Barkly Tableland area of Anthony Lagoon and Eva Downs. Neighbouring tribes where reckoning clockwise from the north, the Yanyuwa, with the Garrwa on their eastern flank, the Wambaya to their south, the Ngarnka east and the Binbinga to their northeast.

== History of contact ==
Before 1900, the Gudanji were on the move penetrating into the Binbinga lands that lay to their northeast. (Note: On Nordlinger's map, the Binbinga are placed to the northwest of the Gudanji. (Nordlinger 1998, p. xv))

== Alternative names ==
- Anga
- Angee (mishearing)
- Gnanji (scribal error)
- Gudanji, Godangee
- Gundangee
- Kakaringa (Tjingili exonym with the sense of "easterners"(kakara = east))
- Kudenji
- Kutandji, Kudandji, Koodanjee, Koodangie
- Kutanjtjii (Alyawarre exonym)
- Nandi
- Ngandji
- Nganji, Ngangi

Source: Tindale 1974, p. 229

== Sources ==
- Basedow, Herbert (1907). "Anthropological notes on the Western Coastal tribes of the Northern Territory of South Australia". Transactions of the Royal Society of South Australia. 31. Adelaide: 1–62.
- Dixon, R. M. W. (2002). Australian Languages: Their Nature and Development. Cambridge University Press. ISBN 978-0-521-47378-1.
- Nordlinger, Rachel (1998). A Grammar of Wambaya, Northern Territory (Australia) (PDF). Pacific Linguistics.
- Radcliffe-Brown, A. R. (October–December 1930). "The Social Organization of Australian Tribes Part II (Continued)". Oceania. 1 (3): 322–341. doi:10.1002/j.1834-4461.1930.tb01652.x. JSTOR 40327330.
- Spencer, Baldwin (1914). Native tribes of the Northern Territory of Australia (PDF). London: Macmillan Publishers.
- Spencer, Sir Baldwin; Gillen, Francis J. (1904). Northern Tribes of Central Australia (PDF). Macmillan Publishers.
- Stationmaster (1895). "On the habits etc. of the aborigines in the district of Powell's Creek, Northern Territory of South Australia". The Journal of the Anthropological Institute of Great Britain and Ireland. 24: 176–180. JSTOR 2842215.
- Tindale, Norman Barnett (1974). "Kotandji (NT)". Aboriginal Tribes of Australia: Their Terrain, Environmental Controls, Distribution, Limits, and Proper Names. Australian National University. ISBN 978-0-708-10741-6. Archived from the original on 20 March 2020.
- Yallop, C. L. (1969). "The Aljawara and Their Territory". Oceania. 39 (3): 187–197. doi:10.1002/j.1834-4461.1969.tb01005.x. JSTOR 40329775.

Mark Harvey (2008)"Proto Mirndi A Discontinuous Language Family in Northern Australia"https://aiatsis.gov.au/collections/item/i9780858835887
