= Jamindjung =

The Jamindjung, also spelt Djamindjung, are an indigenous Australian people of the Northern Territory.

== Language ==
Jaminjung belongs to the Yirram branch of the Mirndi languages, and is related closely to the language spoken by the Ngaliwurru, and, some distantly, to Nungali.

== Country ==
W. E. H. Stanner, writing in 1936, placed the Djamindjung between the north bank of the Victoria River to the south bank of the Fitzmaurice River, with an inland extension from the Timor Sea he reckoned to be about 100 miles. Norman Tindale worked out more specific details, estimating their tribal territory's extent as covering about 2,700 square miles (7,000 km^{2}), from the upper and middle Fitzmaurice through to the Vambarra mountain range and Umyxera Creek, while their southern limits lay at Timber Creek on the Victoria River. Their domain included Bradshaw and the Angalarri River.

== Alternative names ==
- Djamunjun
- Djamundon
- Djamadjong
- Jaminjang, Jaminjung
- Kaminjung
- Tjamindjung, Tjaminjun
- Murinyuwen, Murinyuwan

== Sources ==
- Schultze-Berndt, Eva (2006). "Sketch of a Jaminjung grammar of space". In Levinson, Stephen C.; Wilkins, David P. (eds.). Grammars of Space: Explorations in Cognitive Diversity. Cambridge University Press. pp. 63–114. ISBN 978-1-139-45839-9.
- Stanner, W. E. H. (June 1936). "A Note on Djamindjung Kinship and Totemism". Oceania. 6 (4): 441–451. doi:10.1002/j.1834-4461.1936.tb00204.x. JSTOR 40327576.
- Tindale, Norman Barnett (1974). "Djamindjung (NT)". Aboriginal Tribes of Australia: Their Terrain, Environmental Controls, Distribution, Limits, and Proper Names. Australian National University Press. ISBN 978-0-708-10741-6. Archived from the original on 20 March 2020.
