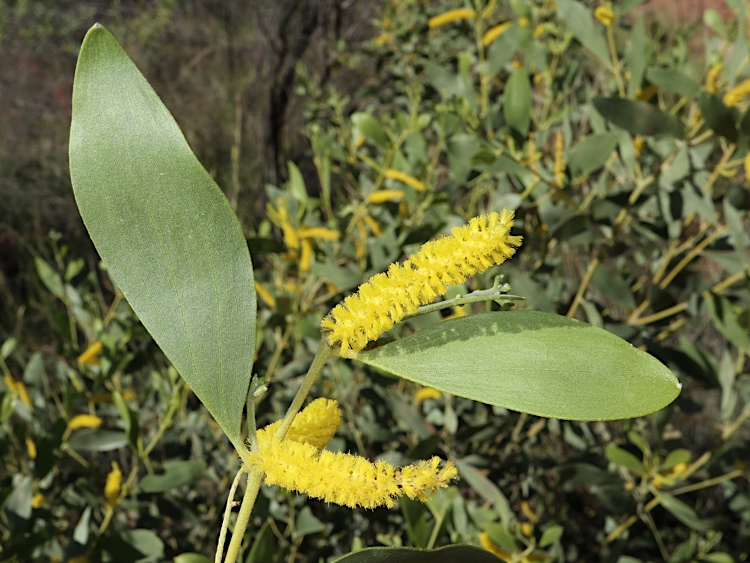
- Between Prairie and Torrens Creek.

Conservation status
- Least Concern (IUCN 3.1)

Scientific classification
- Kingdom: Plantae
- Clade: Embryophytes
- Clade: Tracheophytes
- Clade: Angiosperms
- Clade: Eudicots
- Clade: Rosids
- Order: Fabales
- Family: Fabaceae
- Subfamily: Caesalpinioideae
- Clade: Mimosoid clade
- Genus: Acacia
- Species: A. acradenia

Binomial name
- Acacia acradenia F.Muell.
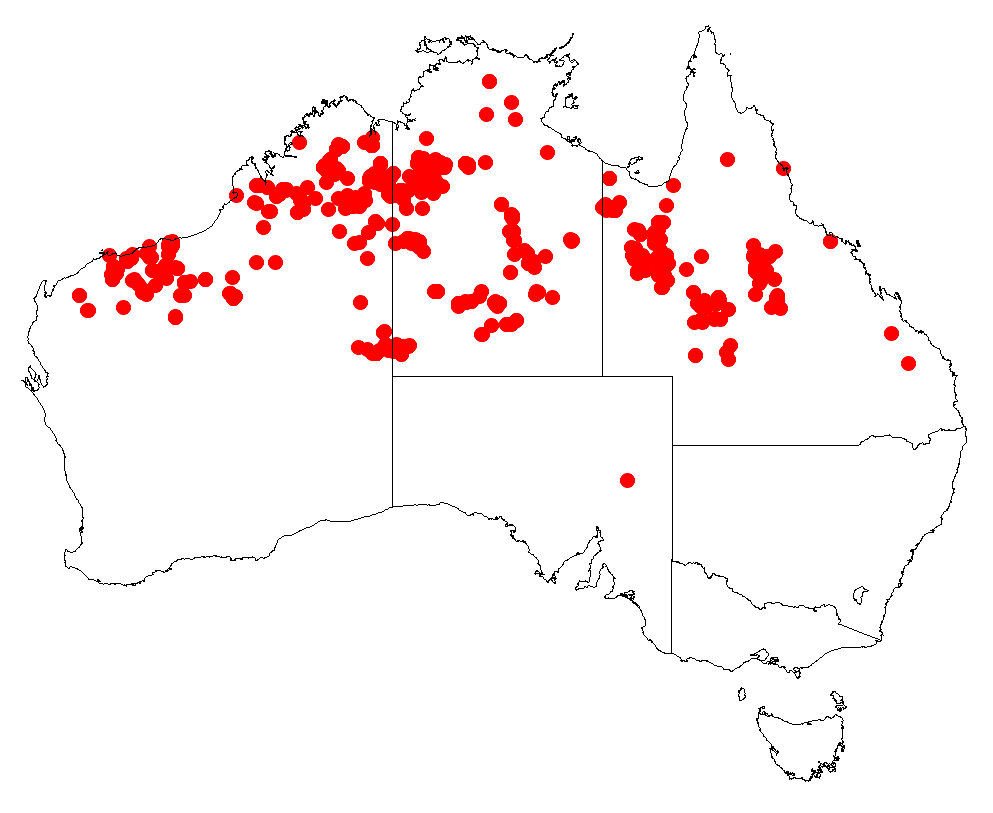
- Occurrence data from Australasian Virtual Herbarium

Synonyms
- Acacia acradena A.D.Chapm. orth. var.; Acacia curvicarpa W.Fitzg.; Racosperma acradenium (F.Muell.) Pedley

= Acacia acradenia =

Species of legume

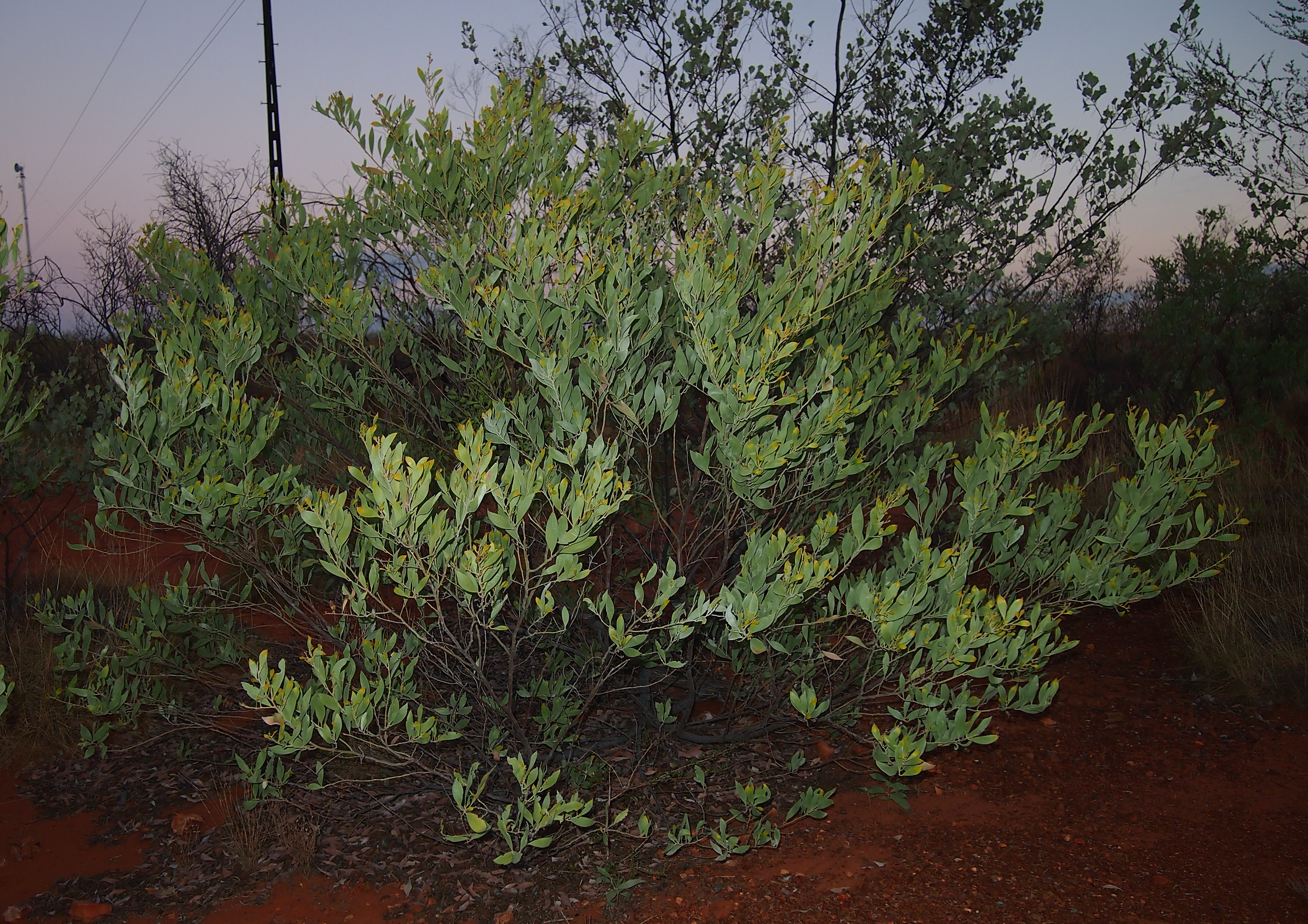
Habit

Acacia acradenia, commonly known as Velvet Hill wattle and silky wattle, is a species of flowering plant in the family Fabaceae and is native to northern and central Australia. It is a spindly shrub or tree with elliptic or narrowly elliptic phyllodes, spikes of orange or golden flowers and linear, crustaceous pods. The Nyangumarta peoples know it as walypuna the Alyawarr call it ampwey, the Jaminjung and Ngaliwurru know it as mindiwirri, the Jaru as binbali or gundalyji, the Kaytetye as ampweye or arwele and the Warlpiri as ngardurrkura.

== Description ==
Acacia acradenia is spindly shrub that typically grows to a height of 0.9–4 m (2 ft 11 in – 13 ft 1 in) but sometimes a tree asx high as 7.5 m (25 ft). It is generally V-shaped with an open and usually spindly form. It usually divides above ground level to form some main stems that are straight, diagonally spreading to erect and covered in smooth light grey bark except toward the base where it can become longitudinally fissured. The phyllodes are usually obliquely elliptic to narrowly elliptic in shape that becomes narrowed at both ends, 40–160 mm (1.6–6.3 in) long and 10–40 mm (0.39–1.57 in) wide with 3 or more prominent veins. It can bloom at any time of year with a peak between March and July or October and November. The flowers are orange or golden and borne in spikes mostly 20–60 mm (0.79–2.36 in) long on a peduncle 1–3 mm (0.039–0.118 in) long in pairs at the axil of the phyllodes. The fruit is a linear, crustaceous pod mostly 40–130 mm (1.6–5.1 in) long. The seeds are dark brown, 3–6 mm (0.12–0.24 in) long and 1.5–3 mm (0.059–0.118 in) wide with a pure white aril.

The species is relatively short lived, is easily killed by fire but sprouts readily from seeds.

== Taxonomy ==
Acacia acradenia was first formally described in 1888 by the botanist Ferdinand von Mueller in 1888 in his Iconography of Australian Species of Acacia and Cognate Genera Decas. The specific epithet (acradenia) means "a gland at the end", referring to the callus at the end of the phyllode.

In tropical parts of the Northern Territory and Queensland A. acradenia is often mistaken for Acacia umbellata.

The type specimen was collected by von Mueller near Depot Creek in the Northern Territory.

== Distribution ==
Velvet Hill wattle is found throughout the Northern Territory extending east into Queensland as far as Prairie and Western Australia. In Western Australia it has a scattered distribution through the Kimberley, Pilbara and northern Goldfields regions. It is found on rocky plains or rocky hills, and along watercourses or damp areas. It grows well in stony soils, skeletal loams or clay pans as part of spinifex and Eucalypt communities. Localized colonies form in areas following disturbance such as fire.

== Uses ==
Indigenous Australians use the species as a food source, water source, shade or shelter and to make weapons and implements.

== See also ==
- List of Acacia species
