= Nungali =

Indigenous Australian people

The Nangali, otherwise known as the Ilngali (Jilngari, Yilngari), are an Indigenous Australian people of the Northern Territory.

== Name ==
The name Nungali, now adopted as the general term, differs from the other ethnonym for these people only in having a prefix attached to it.

== Language ==
Nungali is distantly related to Jaminjung and like the latter is one of the non Pama-Nyungan tongues, usually classified as one of the Djamindjungan/Yirram family of languages. It is thought to be virtually extinct.

== Country ==
Traditional Nungali territory covered approximately 500 square miles (1,300 km^{2}) north of Fitzmaurice River on headwaters of Fish River.

== Alternative names ==
- Ilngali
- Jilngali

== Sources ==
- Schultze-Berndt, Eva (2006). "Sketch of a Jaminjung grammar of space". In Levinson, Stephen C.; Wilkins, David P. (eds.). Grammars of Space: Explorations in Cognitive Diversity. Cambridge University Press. pp. 63–114. ISBN 978-1-139-45839-9.
- Tindale, Norman Barnett (1974). "Jilngali (NT)". Aboriginal Tribes of Australia: Their Terrain, Environmental Controls, Distribution, Limits, and Proper Names. Australian National University Press. ISBN 978-0-708-10741-6.
