= Ngarnji language =

Extinct Mirndi language of Australia

Ngarnji
- Ngarnka
- Native to: Australia
- Region: Barkly Tableland, Northern Territory
- Ethnicity: Ngarnji/Ngarnka
- Extinct: 1997–1998
- Language family: Mirndi: Ngurlun; Ngarnji

Language codes
- ISO 639-3: included in [nji] Gudanji
- Glottolog: ngar1283
- AIATSIS: N121
- ELP: Ngarnka

The Ngarnji (Ngarndji) or Ngarnka (Ngarnga, Ngarnku) language was traditionally spoken by the Ngarnka people of the Barkly Tablelands in the Northern Territory of Australia. The last fluent speaker of the language died between 1997 and 1998. Ngarnka belongs to the Mirndi language family, in the Ngurlun branch. It is closely related to its eastern neighbours Binbinka, Gudanji and Wambaya. It is more distantly related to its western neighbour Jingulu, and three languages of the Victoria River District, Jaminjung, Ngaliwurru and Nungali. There is very little documentation and description of Ngarnka, however there have been several graduate and undergraduate dissertations written on various aspects of Ngarnka morphology, and a sketch grammar and lexicon of Ngarnka is currently in preparation.

== Phonology ==
Ngarnka consonant inventory
	Bilabial	Apico- alveolar	Apico- postalveolar	Lamino- palatal	Dorso- velar
Stop	b /p/	d /t/	rd /ʈ/	j /c/	k /k/
Nasal	m /m/	n /n/	rn /ɳ/	ny /ɲ/	ng /ŋ/
Lateral		l /l/	rl /ɭ/	ly /ʎ/	
Tap		rr /r/			
Glide	w /w/		r /ɻ/	y /j/	

Ngarnka vowel inventory
	Unrounded	Rounded
High	i /i/, iyi /iː/	u /u/, uwu /uː/
Low	a /ɐ/, aa /ɐː/	

== Verbal morphology and syntax ==
=== Inflecting verbs and uninflecting verbs ===
Ngarnka possesses two kinds of verb: inflecting verbs and uninflecting verbs. These two word classes are common in many languages of northern Australia. Inflecting verbs are finite, bear bound pronouns, inflect for tense, aspect and mood, and usually occur in second position. Uninflecting verbs bear only minimal tense inflection (distinguishing non-present tense), and are less distributionally restricted than inflecting verbs, although often occurring clause-initially. Inflecting verbs can constitute an independent predicate in a simple verb construction, whereas uninflecting verbs must occur with an inflecting verb in a light verb construction (although they occur independently in non-finite subordinate clauses). There are only three inflecting verbs in Ngarnka: a general 'do' inflecting verb, a centrifugal locomotion inflecting verb 'go', and a centripetal locomotion inflecting verb 'come'. Examples of inflecting verbs and uninflecting verbs are provided below.

Yangurla ngu-li-ya ngarl-i Binbinka=ka.
NEG IRR.1SG.S-POT-DO.HAB.NPST speak-UV Binbinka.N(ACC)=FAR
I can't speak Binbinka.

Yalkij-b-ani ngu-lu ngarri yangaji.
cook-UV-NPRS IRR.1SG.A-POT(DO.NPRS) 1SG.DAT meat.M(ACC)
I will cook my meat.

Yakal-i ju-l-a yarrkawala.
go-UV IRR.2SG.S-POT-go.NPST far
You will go far away.

=== Simple verb construction ===
When expressing motion events, sometimes Ngarnka will use a simple verb construction with one of the two locomotion inflecting verbs. However, in many cases, a light verb construction will be used with the generic locomotion uninflecting verb yakali 'go', as in the above example. Examples of the locomotion inflecting verbs in simple verb constructions are provided below.

Ni-ya ngki-yarra ilikirri-nmanji.
M-DIST(NOM) R.3SG.M.S-go.PST creek.N-ALL
He went to the river.

Ni-yangka-kunja irri-l-ajkani.
M-DIST-PL.M/N(NOM) IRR.3PL.S-POT-come
They will come (here).

=== Light verb construction ===
The most common predicate type in Ngarnka is the light verb construction, a structure common in northern Australian languages. The Ngarnka light verb construction involves a finite inflecting verb and a non-finite uninflecting verb. Examples of each of the inflecting verbs in light verb constructions are provided below.

Wulanyi-ni ni-ny-akba ngangi kurdayi-bi.
snake.M-ERG HYP.3SG.M.A-2.P-DO.HYP 2SG(ACC) bite-UV
The snake might bite you.

Kujarra-wulu kuda-wulu ngu-l-a=ki langan-bi=ki.
two.N-DU(ACC) hill.N-DU(ACC) IRR.1SG.S-POT-go.NPST=NEAR climb-UV=NEAR
I will go and climb the two hills here.

Ngaj-bi mirnd-ajkani.
see-UV R.1DU.INCL.A-come
You and I came to see it.
