= Yanyuwa =

Yanyuwa or Yanyula may refer to:

- Yanyuwa people
- Yanyuwa language
