= Binbinga =

Total population
- several hundred (less than 1% of the Australian population, about 1% of the Aboriginal population)

Regions with significant populations
- Australia (Northern Territory)

Languages
- Wambaya language, English

Religion
- Aboriginal mythology

The Binbinga, also pronounced Binbinka, are an Indigenous Australian people of the Northern Territory of Australia.

== Language ==
Binbinga is a dialect classified as a variety of the Ngurlun branch of the Mirndi languages, closely related to Wambaya, to the degree that Wambaya, Binbinka and Gudanji are often treated as dialects of a single language. The Binbinga were among these tribes, and today only 89 speakers of Wambaya remain. When someone died, the widow, mother and a number of other female kin were banned from speaking until the deceased had undergone his second, final burial rite.

== Country ==
The Binbinga's traditional lands consisted of some 11,000 square kilometres (4,400 mi^{2}) running southeast from the Old Bauhinia Downs, encompassing the McArthur River Station and Campbell Camp, and the upper limits of the McArthur and Glyde Rivers. Their camps on the McArthur river were described as very picturesque, with "miamias pitched among shady native figs, Leichhardt pines, paperbarks and screw pines, close to the banks of the river".

== People ==
Baldwin Spencer and F. A. Gillen described the physical appearance of the Binbinga as follows:

The men.. have very little hair on the face, and that on the head is allowed to grow to a considerable length and is then made into plaits which are wound round the crown so as to produce the appearance of a close-fitting cap or helmet.

== Mythology ==
In Binbinga metaphysics Ulanji was a supernatural being in the primordial world of the Mungai times, similar to the Bobbi-Bobbi of the Anula people. He was a huge snake, who emerged from a hole at a site called Makumundana. After making a water-hole full of water lilies, he began to move across the country, creating springs and creeks, and also the upper reaches of the Limmen river, and forming hills and ranges. At each creative point in his journey, he conducted ceremonies during which spirit-children came forth from his body who were left to inhabit these localities. At a certain point, at a site called Kuriella-dat-kaulu, he decapitated flying foxes he had observed handing from the rocks. Withdrawing from his body two of his own ribs, he shaped two trees (Lamara) from them which he planted in the ground. At Tutita, he left behind maitjama (quartzite) so that knives and spear-heads could be fashioned from them. He altered the name of a place called Nanawandula, having created waterholes there rich in crocodiles, after removing his heart there, thus giving it the name for heart, Kurta-lula. Thereupon, he sunk underground to continue travelling, emerging only at Uminiwura, the end of his journey, and finally disappeared into the earth.

== Ritual practices and burial rites ==
The Binbinga practised both circumcision and subincision.

Illness among the tribes of this area was believed to be caused by two evil spirits, whose powers were challenged by a third spirit, to whom the Kurdaitcha or medicine man prayed for succor. In the Binbinga version, the medicine man had two gods whose curative assistance he could pray for by singing, doubles of each other and of the medicine man himself.

When a person died, (Note: A Mara man describing his own tribes rites in this regard, which involved cooking and eating the corpse, stated to Spencer and Gillen that similar practices were performed by other local tribes, including the Binding. (Spencer 1914, pp. 252ff.)) his bones were wrapped in a package of paperbark, bound together with strings of human hair and wood bindings. The arms were not included, but, plastered with pipe clay, set aside to be used for pointing the bone. This was set in a fork of a lopped branch about five feet off the ground, and around the base a 3-inch mound of soil, forming a circle measuring roughly 6 feet in diameter. Nearby a fire was lit which was to be tended day and night to ensure the fire did not die. The package was kept in this state until a second and final burial was performed.

== Ethnography ==
The Binbinga were first studied in some detail by Spencer and Gillen who had access to an excellent informant, the medicine man Kurkutji.

== Alternative names ==
- Binbingha, Binbinka, Bing Binga
- Leepitbinga
- Pinbinga

Source: Tindale 1974

== Sources ==
- Elkin, A. P. (1993) [First published 1946]. Aboriginal Men of High Degree. Inner Traditions / Bear & Co. ISBN 978-0-892-81421-3.
- Kendon, Adam (1988). Sign Languages of Aboriginal Australia: Cultural, Semiotic and Communicative Perspectives. Cambridge University Press. ISBN 978-0-521-36008-1.
- Mauss, Marcel (2003). W. S. F. Pickering, W. S. F. (ed.). On Prayer: Text and Commentary. Berghahn Books. p. 80. ISBN 978-1-782-38475-5.
- Pensalfini, Rob (2003). A Grammar of Jingulu: An Aboriginal Language of the Northern Territory. Research School of Pacific and Asian Studies. ISBN 978-0-858-83558-0.
- Spencer, Baldwin (1914). Native Tribes of the Northern Territory of Australia (PDF). Macmillan and Co.
- Spencer, Baldwin; Gillen, Francis (1904). The northern tribes of central Australia (PDF). Macmillan and Co.
- Spencer, Baldwin; Gillen, Francis (2010) [First published 1912]. Across Australia. Vol. 2. Cambridge University Press. ISBN 978-1-108-02042-8.
- Tindale, Norman (1974). "Binbinga (NT)". Aboriginal Tribes of Australia: Their Terrain, Environmental Controls, Distribution, Limits, and Proper Names. Australian National University Press. ISBN 978-0-708-10741-6. Archived from the original on 20 March 2020.
