= Bobbi-Bobbi =

Australian Aboriginal creator being

In myths of the Binbinga people of northern Australia, Bobbi-Bobbi was a supernatural being who lived in the heavens in the Dreamtime. He was a huge snake, similar to the Rainbow Serpent, and was originally benevolent towards humans. From the heavens, he saw that humans needed more than just water to survive, so he created flying foxes for them to catch and eat. When the bats flew too high for the humans to catch them, Bobbi-Bobbi removed one of his own ribs and gave it to humans who used it as the first ever boomerang.

According to the tradition, some humans were not satisfied with these gifts and anxious to see what heaven looked like. Two men pretended they wanted to open a hole in the sky and thank Bobbi-Bobbi personally. They hurled the rib-boomerang and tore a huge hole in the clouds which startled Bobbi-Bobbi so much that he failed to catch the boomerang which fell back to Earth and killed the foolish men. This was the first time that Death had visited the human race, so Bobbi-Bobbi has remained aloof in heaven ever since, making no more attempts to help humans.
