= Elliott District Community Government Council =

Elliott District Community Government Council Northern Territory
- Coordinates: 17°33′13″S 133°32′41″E
- Population: 501 (2006)
  - Density: 92.8/km^{2} (240.3/sq mi)
- Area: 5.4 km^{2} (2.1 sq mi)
- Mayor: Bob Bagnall
- Region: Barkly Tableland
- Federal division(s): Lingiari
- Website: Elliott District Community Government Council

The Elliott District Community Government Council was a local government area of the Northern Territory, Australia. It was centred on the town of Elliott, 254 km north of Tennant Creek and 419 km south of Katherine on the Stuart Highway. The Community Government Council covered an area of 5.4 km² and has a population of 501. The main towns are Elliott and Marlinja.

== History ==
The area's Aboriginal name is Kuliminindi; it is home of the Jingilu Mudburra tribe. Settlement by Europeans started with John McDowall Stuart and the Overland Telegraph line. A station was set up called Newcastle Waters. The station plus the nearby town was the regional centre prior to World War II.

During the war, Elliott was set up as a stopover for convoys heading up to Darwin, 780 km North from Alice Springs, 720 km South of the town and is named after the commanding officer of the base, D. S. Elliott OBE. After the war, Elliott started to overtake Newcastle Waters in importance, and most functions were moved to Elliott. The Gurindji drovers strike of 1966 had repercussions here, with Union Camp being set up in Newcastle Waters Township and camps being set up in Elliott. Today there are Aboriginal communities on either end of town.

The advent of equal pay and conditions resulted in many Aboriginal stockmen losing their jobs to helicopters. The road trains (triple trailer trucks) replaced the drovers, which resulted in many Aboriginal people settling permanently in Elliott. Recently there was a Native Title Case that saw Elliott traditional owners being given Native Title. Together with the Gurungu Aboriginal Land Trust, this means that 95 percent of the town is now back in Aboriginal hands.

== Facilities ==
Elliott facilities include a public bar, two roadhouses, and a caravan park. There is a rest area 23 km N of town near the Newcastle Waters /Marlinja turnoff. There is also a clinic, a police station, and an airstrip serviced by the Royal Flying Doctor Service of Australia.

The Community Development Employment Programme provides employment for many Aboriginal people. There are also public service jobs such as at the Council, as well as the roadhouses and a mechanic shop. Stations all around Elliott provide full-time work on a seasonal basis.

== Politics ==
The Elliott District Community Government Council consists of the President (Mayor) and four councillors.

== Attractions ==
Longreach Waterhole is 12 km West of town. It has coastal bird life on a fresh water perennial lake. Lake Woods is 40 km South; a four-wheel drive is required for the trip.
