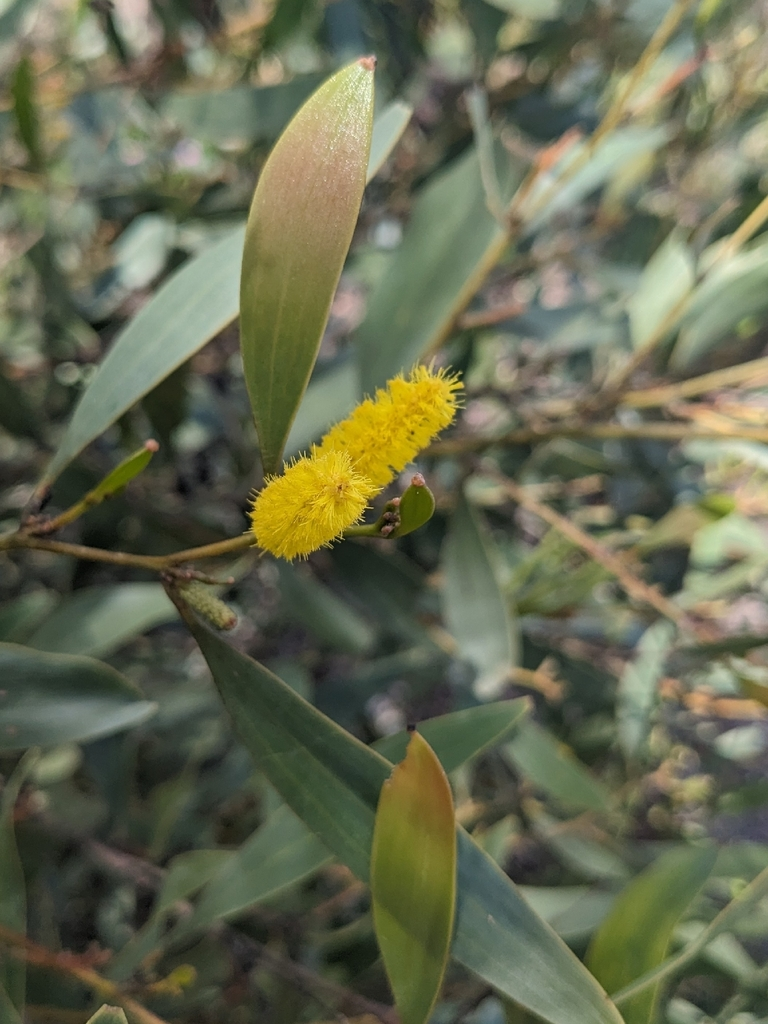
- In Granite Gorge Nature Park near Chewko

Scientific classification
- Kingdom: Plantae
- Clade: Embryophytes
- Clade: Tracheophytes
- Clade: Spermatophytes
- Clade: Angiosperms
- Clade: Eudicots
- Clade: Rosids
- Order: Fabales
- Family: Fabaceae
- Subfamily: Caesalpinioideae
- Clade: Mimosoid clade
- Genus: Acacia
- Species: A. umbellata

Binomial name
- Acacia umbellata A.Cunn. ex Benth.
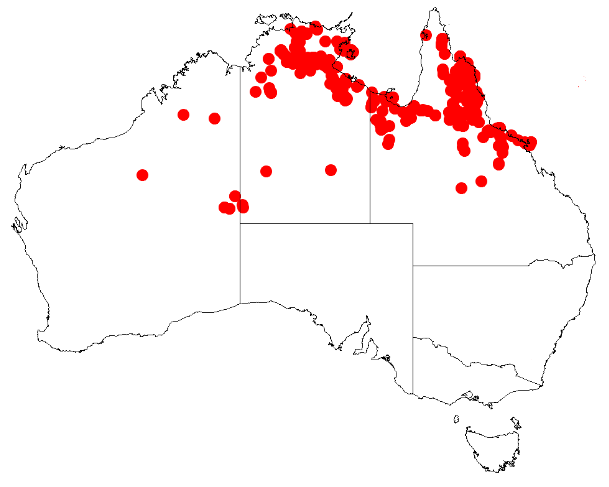
- Occurrence data from AVH

= Acacia umbellata =

Species of legume

Acacia umbellata is a species of wattle native to northern Australia.
