= Jingulu language =

Endangered Mirndi language of Australia

Jingulu
- Djingili
- Native to: Australia
- Region: Barkly Tableland, Northern Territory
- Ethnicity: Jingili
- Native speakers: 23 (2016 census)
- Language family: Mirndi: Jingulu
- Signed forms: Djingili Sign Language

Language codes
- ISO 639-3: jig
- Glottolog: djin1251
- AIATSIS: C22
- ELP: Jingulu
- Jingulu is classified as Severely Endangered by the UNESCO Atlas of the World's Languages in Danger.

Jingulu, also spelt Djingili, is an Australian language spoken by the Jingili people in the Northern Territory of Australia, historically around the township of Elliot. The language is an isolate branch of the Mirndi languages.

The Jingulu have (or had) a well-developed signed form of their language.

== Background and location ==
Other languages spoken in the West Barkly family include Wambaya, Gudanji, Binbinka, and Ngarnka. When the Mudburra people arrived to the region where the Jingili live, a cultural fusion group arose named Kuwarrangu, while the Jingilu and Mudburra cultures still remained separate. Based on geographical proximity, the Jingili and other ethnic groups have related languages with common vocabulary.

Jingulu was historically spoken around the township of Elliot.

== Speakers and status ==
Jingulu has an Ethnologue classification of moribund, meaning that it is an endangered language, with only between 10 and 15 speakers in 1997,^{[4]} the youngest being in the fifties. An additional 20 people had some command of it. However, it was not used in daily communication which instead was conducted in either English or Kriol. In 2019 approximately five people still spoke the language, including Stuart Joel Nuggett, who has recorded music in Jingulu. The remaining speakers are elderly.

== Sign language ==
The Jingulu have (or had) a well-developed signed form of their language.

== Phonology ==
=== Vowels ===
Jingulu has three basic vowel phoneme qualities, given in IPA in the following table. There are two high vowels, /i/ and /u/, and one low vowel /a/. /i/, /a/ and /u/ are front, central, and back, respectively. /u/ is rounded while /a/ and /i/ are unrounded.

Vowel Chart
	Front	Central	Back
Close	i		u
Open		a	

While there are only three phonemically distinct vowel phoneme qualities in Jingulu, the variations in vowel sounds are greater than in grammars with larger vowel phoneme inventories. These three phonemes have a variety of phonetic outputs depending on the word. The close vowel /i/ may be realized as [i], [ɨ] or [e]; the close vowel /u/ most commonly as [u], but also [o] and [ɔ]; and the open vowel /a/ as [a], [ʌ], [æ] and [ə].

Jingulu has contrastive vowel length. The orthographic convention of long high vowels is as two apparent syllable nuclei with a homorganic glide in between. In orthography, /aː/ appears as ⟨aa⟩. The other two are written (and optionally pronounced) with a homorganic consonant, /iː/~/i.ji/ ⟨iyi⟩ and /uː/~/u.wu/ ⟨uwu⟩, respectively. Diphthongs of non-identical vowels in Jingulu are realized as separate syllable nuclei, i.e., ⟨ayi⟩, ⟨awu⟩, ⟨iya⟩, ⟨iyu⟩, ⟨uwa⟩ ⟨uwi⟩.

vowel vs {long high vowel}
{jurdini} vs {jurdiyini}
{'louse'} vs {'tawny frogmouth/owl'}

vowel vs {long low vowel}
{baj} vs {baaj}
{'track, follow'} vs {'arrive, get in'}

{diphthong example}
{jangayi}
'yawn'

==== Vowel harmony ====
An important feature of Jingulu's phonology is vowel harmony. Jingulu exhibits a regressive vowel harmony, which means that the vowels of nominal or verbal roots may be subject to change triggered by suffixes that contain a close vowel and that are directly adjacent to the root. The vowel harmony affects open vowels in the roots, which become close. Due to Jingulu's small inventory of vowels, it will always be the open vowel /a/ that is subject to change, always becoming /i/. However, if vowel harmony is triggered and the root contains a close vowel, none of the open vowels to the left of the close vowel will be subject to change.

=== Consonants ===
Jingulu has eighteen consonant phonemes, distributed across five places of articulation and five manners of articulation.

Consonant Chart
	Bilabial	Alveolar	Retroflex	Palatal	Velar
Plosive	b	d	ɖ ⟨rd⟩	ɟ ⟨j⟩	k
Nasal	m	n	ɳ ⟨rn⟩	ɲ ⟨ny⟩	ŋ ⟨ng⟩
Rhotic		r ⟨rr⟩			
Approximant	w		ɻ ⟨r⟩	j ⟨y⟩	w
Lateral		l	ɭ ⟨rl⟩	ʎ ⟨ly⟩	

Note: ⟨rr⟩ represents a flapped or trilled rhotic

Noticeably, all places of articulation have a stop phoneme. The consonant inventory is typical of Australian languages, with a lack of phonologically distinct fricatives and affricates as well as absence of phonemic consonant germinates. One noteworthy aspect of Jingulu that is unusual for Australian grammars is that it does not have series of interdentals.

There is no concrete evidence that voicing is contrastive. There is only little evidence showing that the retroflex consonants are contrastive. Most speakers of Jingulu do not make a distinction between the retroflex consonants and their alveolar equivalents. Often they merely serve as allophones. However, there are a number of minimal pairs where there indeed is a distinction, for instance dirnd- 'shoot' and dind- 'grind'; mininmi 'Acacia victoriae' and mirnirnmi 'fire drill'; and walu 'forehead' and warlu 'burn scar'.

The glides, [w] and [j], may be dropped word-initially, which is also true for [ŋ]. The latter may also be replaced by a glide.

widij- 'to tie' may be realized as /widij-/ or /idij-/
yidaangka 'in a few days' may be realized as /jidaːŋka/ or /idaːŋka/

ngirrm- 'to make' may be realized as /ŋirm-/, /irm-/, or /jirm-/
nguny- 'to give' may be realized as /ŋuɲ-/, /uɲ-/, or /wuɲ-/

=== Syllable structure ===
According to the grammar:

'C' = Consonant
'V' = Vowel
'L' = Highly sonorous consonant (i.e. liquids and glides)

The basic syllable structure in Jingulu is CV. CVC and CVLC are also permissible structures. The basic phonological unit is the open (CV) syllable when V is a long vowel, while the basic phonological unit is the closed (CVC) syllable when V is a short vowel. A phonotactic restriction of Jingulu is that rr and ly cannot be word-initial. The word-final phoneme is nearly always a vowel.

Consonant clusters are evidenced in the Jingulu syllable structure. Clusters may be word-final only if they consist of a sonorant and a [-nasal] plosive, in that order. The largest possible clusters are triconsonantal, consisting of a liquid, nasal, and stop, strictly in this order. Furthermore, they must be placed word-internally.

Syllabic Template
Template	Instantiation	Translation
CV	/jinj.ku/	'wood-chip'
CVC	/minj.kuj.ku/	'egg yolk'
CVLC	/mulk.bul.ku/	'small swamp'
CVLC/CV (triconsonantal cluster)	/lirb.ju/	'egg yolk'
CVLC (word-final cluster)	/walk/	'open'

=== Stress ===
In Jingulu, only vowels can be stress bearing units (SBUs). For single morphemes, stress is predictable, landing on the penultimate SBU of a word. The final SBU is never stressed. This does not hold true for Jingulu words that come from the Pama-Nyungan languages of countries neighboring the Jingili. In general, however, Jingulu follows the following pattern:

- 2 SBUs → stress on initial SBU
- 3 SBUs → generally stress on second SBU
- 4 SBUs → generally primary stress on third SBU, secondary stress on initial SBU
- 5 SBUs → primary stress on penultimate or antepenultimate SBU, secondary stress on initial SBU
- 6 SBUs → primary stress on antepenultimate SBU, secondary stress on initial SBU.

Long vowels and diphthongs have two SBUs, signifying that they do not exist as their own phoneme.

== Morphology ==
Jingulu has both prefixes and suffixes. Morphemes can sometimes stand alone as a word, such as with pronouns and certain cases of demonstratives and adverbials, but the majority of roots must have affixes. Both derivational and inflectional affixes can be found in the grammar.

=== Parts of speech ===
Jingulu vocabulary can be split into three broad categories of parts of speech: nominal, verbal, and adverbial.

==== Nominal ====
Nominals are modified/affixed with case marking and morphological discourse markings.

winiyiki-rni [nayurni ngarrirnini]
foreign-F woman 1SG.GEN.F
'My wife is a foreigner'

==== Verbal ====
The minimum words required to form an acceptable sentence in Jingulu is a light verb and either a subject or a coverbal root.

ngurru-wa.
1PL.INCL-will.go
'Let's go.'

nguka-ju.
cry-do
'It's crying' (coverbal root)

==== Adverbial ====
Aside from discourse markers, adverbs do not have affixation. In some cases, adverbs must exist immediately before coverbal roots.

kardarrukuji biba-marri.
all.night storm-DIST
'There was a storm all night.'

=== Derivation ===
Jingulu has derivational affixes of the type nominalisation and adverbialisation.

==== Nominalisation ====
Jingulu has three nominalising affixes: -ajka, -ajkal, and -jbunji, the latter being very rare.

-ajka derives nouns from verbs, specifically a verb to the person who is undergoing the action denoted by the verb.

Bulungkurri-mbili duwa-ardi buliki-rna ngarnu darr-akja.
Bluebush-LOC rise-HAB cow-FOC 3SG.ACC.M eat.NOM(P)
'Where the bluebush grows is grazing country for cattle.'

the action of eating → that which is eaten

-ajkal derives nouns from verbs, specifically verbs to represent someone or something that performs the verb.

Ngany-ajkal-irni nyamirna-rni nayu-wurli-rni.
sing-NOM(A)-F that(F)-ERG woman-PL-ERG
'Those women are singers.'

the action of singing → that which is singing

-jbunji changes a root meaning to something that has the property associated with that root. This is a less used nominalising affix compared to the other two.

Kula-jbunji jami-rna abulda kurlukurla-ka.
speared-ADJ that(M)-FOC accidentally small(M)-PST.HAB
'That little chap there was accidentally speared.'

the action of spearing → that which has been speared

==== Adverbialisation ====
Jingulu has two adverbialising affixes: -kaji and -nama.

-kaji is similar to 'really', 'right', or 'completely', indicating that the thing it is describing is done to its greatest extent.

Kurrubardu ngirrma-nga-yi mujiya-kaji nga-ka.
boomerang make-1SG-FUT forget-through 1SG-PST.HAB
'I want to make a boomerang but I've completely forgotten how.'

forget → completely forget

-nama can mean 'still', 'already', 'this time', 'in the time of...', and more. It is typically used to emphasize that the root it is affixing is happening over time.

Jaburra-nama nga-rruku.
before-time 1SG-went
'I already went'

went → already went

=== Nominals ===
The major uses of affixation in Jingulu are found in the expression of demonstratives, as well as the nominal features pronouns, case, number, and (in)definiteness discussed in the next section.

==== Demonstratives ====
Jingulu has three kinds of demonstratives: referential, anaphoric and cataphoric. In Jingulu, the referential demonstratives, of which there are about five sets, refer to objects that may be distal or proximal, and may be translated as "this" or "that." The anaphoric demonstratives, of which there is one set, refer to something that is already known by the speaker and listener at the time of speaking, and may be translated as "this (you know)" or "that (you know)." Finally, the cataphoric demonstrative, of which there is only one, refers to something that is not yet known by both the speaker and listener and is to be introduced, and may be translated as "this (which you are to know about)" or "that (which you are to know about)."

As the demonstratives are considered nominals, most of them belong to one of the four nominal classes.

===== Referential =====
There are five sets of referential demonstratives: jama and jimi; nyam-; ngin- and nyin-; ngunu; and ngunungku. The first three sets are all by default distal, but may be made proximal by the use of the suffix -(r)niki. None of the last two sets may take the proximal marker, as ngunu is always considered distal, and ngunungku is generally considered proximal, normally translated as "this way."

These demonstratives vary based on gender and animacy. The demonstrative jama belongs to the masculine class, and jimi to the neuter class. However, jama may refer to nominals of all classes, and jimi may also refer to nominals of the vegetable class. The demonstrative nyam- takes either the suffix -a, -arni- or -bala depending on whether it refers to a nominal of the masculine, feminine, or neuter or vegetable class, respectively. Likewise, the demonstratives ngin- and nyin- take the suffix -da, -a or -i depending on whether it refers to a nominal of the masculine, feminine or neuter class, respectively, and become ngima and nyima when referring to a nominal of the vegetable class, respectively. While a nyam- demonstrative takes the proximal marker, it becomes nyamarniki no matter class. The demonstrative ngunu belongs to the neuter class, but may also refer to nominals of the vegetable class. Ngunungku may refer to nominals of all classes.

Jimi-rni jurruma-mi burrbaji-kaji.
that(N)-FOC wipe.out-IRR finish-through
'Get rid of all that.'
(jimi is neuter)

Jimi-niki-ni karriyaku imbiy-urru-ju marrinju.
DEM(N)-PROX-FOC different speak-3PL-PRES language
'This is a different language they speak (here).'
(jimi is neuter + -niki modifier)

Jama-baji-ni buyu-wurru-ju.
DEM(M)-PL-FOC smoke-3PL-PRES
'Those people are smoking.'
(jama is masculine)

Bulajbunji jamaniki-rni.
speared(M) this(M)-FOC
'This guy has been speared.'
(jamaniki is masculine + -niki modifier)

Nyama ngaba-ju wangkurra-ngkujku ngima-rni-rni yurrku-nu bukumarra.
that(M) have-do honey that(V)-ERG-FOC flower-did corkwood
'The corkwood has honey-laden flowers.'
(nyama is masculine)

Nyama nginda ngajanyaju nyarruku.
2SG-NOM that(M) see-2SG-do 2SG-went
'You can see yourself and him.'
(nginda is masculine)

Irriminjulu ngini-rniki buba ngirrma-nga-yi bardakurra.
kindling DEM(N)-PROX fire make-1SG-FUT good(M)
'This kindling will make a good fire.'
(ngini is neuter + -niki modifier)

Wanyik-urlu nyina-bulu ladaji-wunyu-ju arduku.
girl-DU DEM(F)-DU dry-3.DU-PRES slow
'The two girls are slowly drying out.'
(nyina is feminine)

Ngunudij bila-mi nyanyalu!
DEM(N) break-IRR branch
'Break that branch!'
(ngunu is neuter)

Jangkuwardka-ngarri-yi ngunungku kalirrungu-ngka.
climb_up-1SG-FUT DEM hill-AL
'I will climb the mountain this way.'
(ngunungku is "this way")

===== Anaphoric =====
Anaphoric/discourse demonstratives refer to the aforementioned. There is one set of anaphoric demonstratives: kuna and kuya. These are only used rarely, and are often replaced by referential demonstratives. The former refers to nominals of the masculine class, and the latter to nominals of the neuter class. However, the former may also refer to nominals of other classes, and the latter to nominals of the vegetable class as well.

Kuyu-ngka-nama ya-rruku lurrbu.
ANAPH(N)-ALL-time 3SG-went return
'He went back there.'
(kuyu is neuter)

Nginda wurru-ku kuna-ngka biningkurru-ngka.
dem(M) 3PL-went DEM(ANAPH)-all lake-all
'They went to that lake (you know the one).'
(kuna is neuter)

Kuyu-mbili-rni mankiya-nga-yi.
DEM(ANAPH)-LOC-FOC sit-1SG-FUT
'I'll go sit in that place (that you know).'

===== Cataphoric =====
The only cataphoric demonstrative is jiyi and refers to nominals of all classes.

=== Nominal features ===
==== Gender ====
All nominals in Jingulu belong to a certain gender or class of which there are four: masculine, feminine, neuter and vegetable. The vegetable class is the smallest of the classes with fewest nominals. Next comes the feminine class, and then the neuter and the masculine classes.

The characteristic endings of nominals belonging to the vegetable class are -imi and -ibi. Most nominals of this class are long, thin, pointed or sharp objects. For instance, a lot of vegetables, body parts, instruments and weather phenomena. Examples include wardbardbumi "bush passionfruit," mankijbi "back of neck" and kingmi "rainbow."

The characteristic endings for feminine nominals are -ini, -irni, -idi and -irdi. Most nominals of this class are female animates, different kinds of axes, the sun, as well as for most smaller songbirds, and many unusual animals. Examples include nambiliju "female body," dardawurni "axe" and lirrikbirni "cockatoo."

The characteristic ending for masculine nominals is -a, although a lot of masculine nominals also end in a consonant. Most nominals of this class are animates, although it also contains a number of flat or rounded inanimates. Examples include jambilija "male body," kiyinarra "vagina" and yarrulan "youth."

Finally, the characteristic ending for neuter nominals is -u. This class contains nominals that do not fall into any of the previous classes, and especially words for abstract concepts and entities. Examples include yurrku "nectar," ngabarangkurru "blood" and karala "ground."

==== Number ====
Jingulu utilizes number morphology based on three numbers: singular, dual, and plural. The dual number is represented by the suffix /-bila/, and the plural number is represented by the suffix /-bala/, but they have different phonetic realizations depending on the allomorph used in context.

Ngarri-ni-bila bardarda-yila manyan wunyu-ju.
1SG.GEN-M-DU.ANIM younger.brother-DU.ANIM sleep 3DU-do
'My two younger brothers are asleep.'
(bila refers to the number of brothers, dual)

Ngaja-nga-ju murrkunbala bayin-bala wijinki-wurri-ju nyambala lurrju-mbili wijinki-wurru-ju.
that(m)-PL three(M) people-PL.ANIM stand-3PL-do DEM(N) sandy.ridge-LOC upright-3PL-do
'I see three men standing on a sandy ridge.'
(bala refers to the number of people, plural)

==== Case ====
Case is realized in core and semantic case markings. Core case marking includes the ergative case ([-ka]/ [-nga] for feminine kin terms/feminine nominals and [-rni] for other nominals) and the dative case (/-rna/). Semantic/adpositional case markings include the instrumental case to mark inanimate subjects of transitive clauses (/-(w)arndi/, with the rare exception [-marndi]). Semantic/adpositional case markings function differently from core markings; it adds more information to the word it is affixing by actually referencing a location, direction, or some other aspect.

Arrkuja-narna-nu ngaya kardayi-rni.
scratch-3MS-did 1SG-NOM cat-ERG
'The cat scratched me.'

Ngangi-rna ya-ardu ngirrik-ardu walanja-rna.
meat-DAT 3SG-go hunt-go goanna-DAT
'He's going hunting for goanna meat.'

Ngaba-ardimi jimi-rna ngarnu larnku-rdarra ukurdu-nga-mbili nyami-nga-mbili-rni.
have-DIST that(N)-FOC 3SG.ACC.M stuff-PL bag-DAT.F-LOC DEM(F)-DAT.F-LOC-FOC
'He brought all his equipment out of a bag.'

Makirdi-warndi dirnda-nu.
gun-INS shoot-did.
'He fired (with) a gun.'

=== Reduplication ===
In addition to affixation, reduplication is another morphophonological process of Jingulu. The reduplication pattern in Jingulu is internal reduplication, typically of the first VC(C) syllable structure in the root, which is then infixed.

mardilyi → mardardilyi
lame {} {lame folks}

imikirni → imimikirni
{old woman} {} {old women}

== Syntax ==
Jingulu has free word order, therefore no basic word order can be established. Jingulu is syntactically classified as a Non-configurational language. The predicate (both argument and verb) of a clause will lack encyclopedic information.

The following simple Jingulu sentences are all acceptable versions of the same phrase to native speakers:

=== Simple sentences ===
Uliyijanga ngunjaju karalu.
Sun burning ground
'The sun is burning the ground.'

Uliyijanga karalu ngunjaju.
Sun ground burning
'The sun is burning the ground.'

Ngunjaju uliyijanga karalu.
Burning sun ground
'The sun is burning the ground.'

Ngunjaju karalu uliyijanga.
Burning ground sun
'The sun is burning the ground.'

Karalu uliyijanga ngunjaju.
Ground sun burning
'The sun is burning the ground.'

Karalu ngunjaju uliyijanga.
Ground burning sun
'The sun is burning the ground.'

==== Verbless clauses ====
Verbless clauses lack an overt verb, normally compensating for this with two nominal elements that act as clausal predicates in its place. In syntax, verbless clauses are typically realized so that one nominal refers to the subject, while the referent of that nominal serves as the predicate, usually realized in subject-predicate order. Predicates in verbless clauses can be adjectives or nouns, possessors, adpositionals, or adverbs.

Miringmi bardakurrumi.
gum good(V)
'Gum is good.'

==== Adverb placement ====
Adverbs are one of the few word types that hold a strong preference for certain sentence positions with respect to the verb or to clause boundaries, depending on the type of adverb. Adverbs of time are typically sentence-initial, adverbs of place are typically at either the beginning or end of the sentence, and manner adverbs are placed before the verb most often.

jayili urdurru ka-rdu marru-ngka.
under inside 3SG-go house-ALL
'Underneath the house.'

=== Complex sentences ===
Word order is also free for complex sentences. Complex sentences in Jingulu can be split into two categories: coordinate and subordinate structures.

==== Coordinate structures ====
Coordinate structures are found in complex sentences in which the tense of the two clauses is absolutive; i.e. the event associated with each refer to time of utterance. The two clauses may or may not occur at the same time, but they should not be reliant on one another in their occurrence.

Mankiya-nu dibij-kaji ya-rruku.
sit-did outside-through 3SG-went
'She sat here and he went outside.'

==== Subordinate structures ====
Subordinate structures are found in complex sentences in which the two clauses are reliant on one another, the first being the tense-determining main clause and the second being the dependent subordinate clause. The structure of these sentences can be implemented in two ways: the tense may be indicated by eliminating the core verb, or the core verb may remain but with tense features determined based on the event time of the main clause rather than the utterance time.

Jinjku maja-mi jiminiki buba ngirrmi-mindi-yi jalurruka umbumi-mindi-yi.
woodchip get-IRR this(N) fire make-1DU.INCL-FUT tea cook-1DU.INCL-FUT
'Get some woodchips so we can build this fire and make some tea.'

== Text example ==
Kamamurra Marluka

Bundurrunu umbumami ngarnu jamirnani marlukarni, bundundurru marriya, angkula wumbumaardi kamamurra. Kamamurra jamarni marlukarni narnangajarriya biyurlarruni, kaminjirru kularrani. Kaminjirru kulayarni ngarnu ngajanarriya bundundurru marliya. Nginirni bundurru ngabangarriyi ngarni ngindirna marlukarna. Bubujirna marlukarna ngabangarriyi ngarnu bundurrunu ngunyangarriyi, ngambaya manyan kaya bundundurra.

The Old Blind Man

Be so kind as to cook that old man some food, he can't cook because he's blind. That old blind man is looking about for his children, perhaps his grandchildren or nephews. Our young people look after our feeding when we are sick. I'll take some food to that old man. I'll take this food over and give it to the old white-haired man so that he can have a sleep once he's full up.

== Bibliography ==
- Chadwick, Neil (1968). "Djingili (North Australia) in a comparative perspective". Oceania. 38 (3): 220–228. doi:10.1002/j.1834-4461.1968.tb00956.x.
- Chadwick, Neil (1968). A descriptive study of the Djingili language (MA thesis). University of Armidale.
- Chadwick, Neil (1975), A Descriptive Study of the Djingili Language, Australian Institute of Aboriginal Studies, ISBN 978-0-85575-040-4
- Chadwick, Neil (1989), The relationship of Jingulu and Jaminjungan, Darwin: Northern Territory University, OCLC 271768740
- Pensalfini, Robert J. (1995), Jingulu-English English-Jingulu draft dictionary
- Pensalfini, Robert J. (1999), Case Suffixes as Discourse Markers in Jingulu
- Pensalfini, Robert J. (2000). Optional disagreement and the case for feature hierarchies. The Chicago Linguistics Society's 35th Meeting. Chicago, IL: Chicago Linguistics Society.
- Pensalfini, Robert J. (2001), "On the Typological and Genetic Affiliation of Jingulu", in Simpson, Jane; Nash, David; Laughren, Mary; Austin, Peter; Alpher, Barry (eds.), Forty years on Ken Hale and Australian languages, Pacific Linguistics, pp. 385–399
- Pensalfini, Robert J. (2001), "Part of Speech Mismatches in Modular Grammar: New Evidence from Jingulu" (PDF), Linguistic Variation Yearbook, 1: 209–227, doi:10.1075/livy.1.09pen
- Pensalfini, Robert J. (2002), "Vowel harmony in Jingulu" (PDF), Lingua, 112 (7): 561–586, doi:10.1016/s0024-3841(01)00061-4
- Pensalfini, Robert J. (2003), A grammar of Jingulu: an Aboriginal language of the Northern Territory, Pacific Linguistics, doi:10.15144/PL-536, hdl:1885/146163, ISBN 978-0-85883-558-0
- Pensalfini, Robert J. (2003a), "Verbs as Spatial Deixis Markers in Jingulu", Language Description Informed by Theory, Studies in Language Companion Series, vol. 147, pp. 123–152, doi:10.1075/slcs.147.07pen, ISBN 978-90-272-0614-5
- Black, Paul (2007), "Lexicostatistics with massive borrowing: the case of Jingulu and Mudburra", Australian Journal of Linguistics, 27 (1): 63–71, doi:10.1080/07268600601172959, S2CID 145770425
