= Ngurlun languages =

Mirndi language branch of Australia

Ngurlun
- West Barkly (reduced)
- Geographic distribution: Barkly Tableland, Australia
- Linguistic classification: Mirndi: Ngurlun
- Subdivisions: Ngarnka †; Wambaya

Language codes
- Glottolog: guda1245
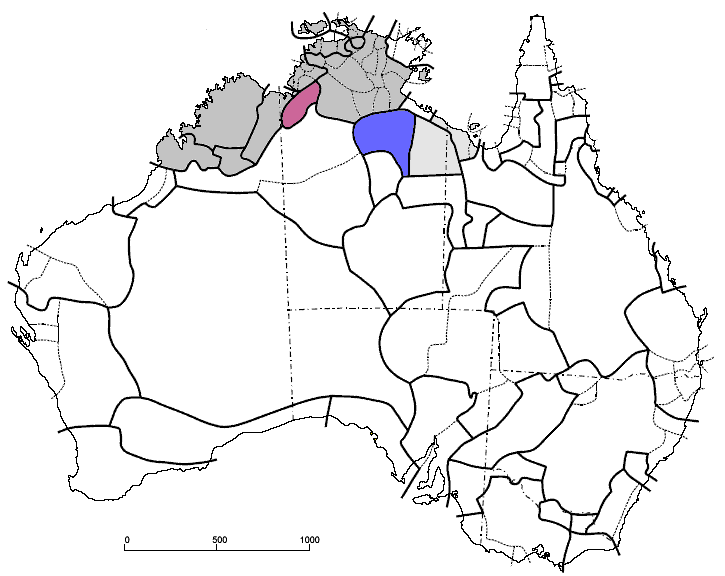
- Yirram Barkly other non-Pama–Nyungan families

The Ngurlun languages, also known as Eastern Mirndi, are a branch of the Mirndi languages spoken around in the Barkly Tableland of Northern Territory, Australia. The branch consists of two to four languages, depending on what is considered a dialect: Ngarnka, Wambaya, and often Binbinka and Gurdanji.

The group was formerly thought to be most closely related to the Jingulu language, with this larger group called West Barkly or simply Barkly, but the connection is no longer thought to be genealogical.
