= Nungali language =

Language of Northern Territory, Australia

Nungali
- Yilngali
- Native to: Australia
- Region: Upper Daly River, Northern Territory
- Ethnicity: Nungali
- Native speakers: 8 (2021 census)
- Language family: Mirndi: Yirram; Nungali

Language codes
- ISO 639-3: nug
- Glottolog: nung1291
- AIATSIS: N28
- ELP: Nungali

Nungali, or (with a different prefix) Yilngali, is an Australian language. It was spoken in the Northern Territory of Australia, around the upper Daly River. Its closest relative is the Jaminjung language.

== Grammar ==
=== Cases ===
It is the only Yirram language which has retained the original four-class system in nominals. The four classes are masculine, feminine, neuter and plants, and each of the classes have separate prefixes expressing the absolutive case, locative or ergative case, and the dative case.

Class		Abs.	Loc. / Erg.	Dat.
I	Masc.	ti-	nyi-	ki-
II	Fem.	nya-	nyani-	kanyi-
III	Neut.	nu- / ni-	nyi-	ki- / ku-
IV	Plants	ma-	-	ki-

The locative case is also productive when it comes to placenames. An example is Nyimarlanpurruni referring to the Timber Creek area, which consists of the neuter locative prefix nyi-, the word for "river gum", the plural marker -purru, and an additional marker of the neuter locative, -ni.
