= Wambaya language =

Endangered Mirndi language of Australia's Northern Territory

Wambaya
- McArthur River
- Native to: Australia
- Region: Barkly Tableland, Northern Territory
- Ethnicity: Wambaya, Gudanji, Binbinga
- Native speakers: 43 (2021 census) (24 Wambaya; 19 Gudanji)
- Language family: Mirndi: Ngurlun; Wambaya
- Dialects: Wambaya; Gudanji; Binbinka

Language codes
- ISO 639-3: Either: wmb – Wambaya nji – Gudanji
- Glottolog: wamb1258
- AIATSIS: C19 Wambaya, C26 Gurdanji, N138 Binbinga
- ELP: Wambaya
- Binbinka

Wambaya is a Non-Pama-Nyungan West Barkly Australian language of the Mirndi language group that is spoken in the Barkly Tableland of the Northern Territory, Australia. Wambaya and the other members of the West Barkly languages are somewhat unusual in that they are suffixing languages, unlike most Non-Pama-Nyungan languages which are prefixing.

The language was reported to have 12 speakers in 1981, and some reports indicate that the language went extinct as a first language. However, in the 2011 Australian census 56 people stated that they speak Wambaya at home. That number increased to 61 in the 2016 Census.

Rachel Nordlinger notes that the speech of the Wambaya, Gudanji and Binbinka people "are clearly dialects" of a single language, which she calls "McArthur", while Ngarnga is closely related but is "probably best considered a language of its own".

== Phonology ==
=== Consonants ===
	Peripheral		Laminal	Apical	
	Labial	Velar	Palatal	Alveolar	Retroflex
Stop	b	ɡ	ɟ	d	ɖ
Nasal	m	ŋ	ɲ	n	ɳ
Lateral			ʎ	l	ɭ
Rhotic				ɾ ~ r	ɻ
Approximant	w		j		

- Sounds /ɡ, ŋ/ are heard as palatalized [ɡʲ, ŋʲ] when before front vowels.
- /ɾ/ is heard as a trill [r] when in pre-consonantal position.

=== Vowels ===
	Front	Back
High	ɪ, iː	ʊ, uː
Low	a, aː	

- /a/ can be heard as [æ] when after palatal sounds /ɟ, ɲ/ and before /j/.
- /ɪ/ is heard as [i] when before /j/.
