= Yirram languages =

Languages of Aboriginal Australians of the Northern Territory

Yirram
- Djamindjungan
- Geographic distribution: Victoria River, Australia
- Linguistic classification: Mirndi: Yirram
- Subdivisions: Nungali; Jaminjung

Language codes
- Glottolog: djam1254
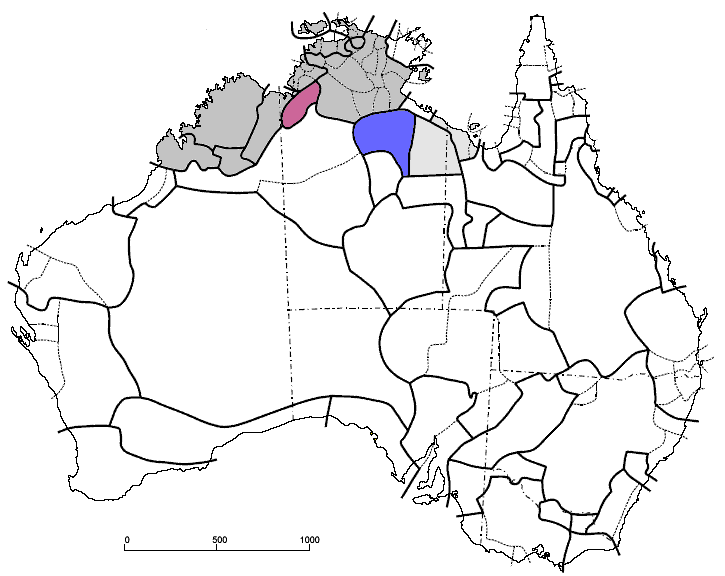
- Yirram Barkly other non-Pama–Nyungan families

The Yirram or Jaminjungan languages, also known as Western Mirndi, are a branch of the Mirndi languages spoken around the Victoria River in the Northern Territory of Australia. The name of these languages is derived from the dual clitic which is "yirram" in each of the languages.

It consists of two languages, the Nungali language and the Jaminjung language. A third language has been proposed, Ngaliwurru, but it is often thought to be merely a dialect of the Jaminjung language.
