= Mirndi languages =

Australian language family

Mirndi
- Mindi
- Geographic distribution: Victoria River and Barkly Tableland, Northern Territory
- Linguistic classification: One of the world's primary language families
- Subdivisions: Yirram (Jaminjungan); Jingulu (Djingili); Ngurlun (East Mirndi)

Language codes
- Glottolog: mirn1241
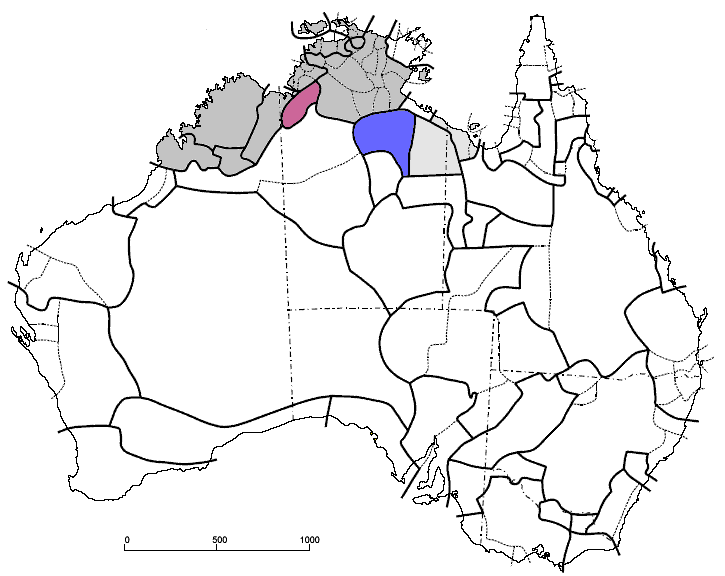
- Yirram Barkly (Jingulu + Ngurlun) other non-Pama–Nyungan families

The Mirndi or Mindi languages are an Australian language family spoken in the Northern Territory of Australia. The family consists of two sub-groups and an isolate branch: the Yirram languages, and the Ngurlun languages and Jingulu language some 200 km farther to the southeast, separated by the Ngumpin languages. The primary difference between the two sub-groups is that while the Yirram languages are all prefixing like other non-Pama–Nyungan languages, the Ngurlun languages are all suffixing like most Pama–Nyungan languages.

The name of the family is derived from the dual inclusive pronoun ('we', in the sense of 'you and I') which is shared by all the languages in the family in the form of either mind- or mirnd-.

== Classification ==
The family has been generally accepted after being first established by Neil Chadwick in the early 1980s. The genetic relationship is primarily based upon morphology and not lexical comparison, with the strongest evidence being found among the pronouns. However, "there are very few other systematic similarities in other areas of grammar[, which] throw some doubts on the Mirndi classification, making it less secure than generally accepted." Nonetheless, as of 2008 proto-Mirndi has been reconstructed.

- Mirndi
  - Yirram
    - Nungali
    - Jaminjung
  - Jingulu
  - Ngurlun
    - Ngarnka
    - Wambaya

An additional language may be added, Ngaliwurru. However, it is unsure whether it is a language on its own, or merely a dialect of the Jaminjung language. The same is true for Gudanji and Binbinka, although these are generally considered dialects of the Wambaya language. These three dialects are collectively referred to as the McArthur River languages.

== Vocabulary ==
Due to the close contact been the Yirram languages and the Ngurlun languages, and the Ngumpin languages and other languages as well, many of the cognates that the Yirram and Ngurlun languages share may in fact be loanwords, especially of Ngumpin origin. For instance, while the Barkly language Jingulu only shares 9% of its vocabulary with its Yirram relative, the Ngaliwurru dialect of the Jaminjung language, it shares 28% with the nearby Ngumpin language Mudburra.

The Jingulu language shares 29% and 28% of its vocabulary with the Wambaya language and the Ngarnka language respectively. The Ngarnka language shares 60% of its vocabulary with the Wambaya language, while the Wambaya language shares 69% and 78% with its dialects, Binbinka and Gudanji, respectively. Finally, these two dialects share 88% of their vocabulary.

Capell (1940) lists the following basic vocabulary items:

gloss	Nungali	Jilngali	Djämindjung	Ngaliwuru
man	diːimbul	djumbul	djumbul	djumbul
woman	njäŋaːruŋ	ŋaruŋ	malɛji	ŋaruŋ
head	niimburu	guɽunjuŋ	gulaga	djumburu
eye	mijaŋargin	djuwud	djuwad	djuwud
nose	nijuija	djuwija	djuwija	djuwija
mouth	nijara	djära	djära	djära
tongue	niaŋandjilin	djalaṉ	djalaṉ	djalan
stomach	meuŋug	buru	magala	magala
bone	guːdjin	bunu, gujuwan	gujuwan	gujuwan
blood	guŋulu	garŋan	wurinjun	guŋulu
kangaroo	dijaŋara	jaŋara	jaŋara	jaŋara
opossum	djaŋana	ŋurgudi	djägulädji	djägulädji
emu	gumurindji			
crow	duagirag	waŋguɽin	waŋgina	waŋgina
fly	diridjburu	gunäma	nämbul	gunäma
sun	njailän	wulŋan	wulŋan	waŋgu
moon	dabaraŋaɽa	baraŋan	djägilin	baɽaŋan
fire	nujug	gujug	gujug	gujug
smoke	niulaṉ	djuwulaṉ	djuwulaṉ	djuːlaṉ
water	gogo	gogo	gogo	gogo

== Proto-language ==
Proto-Mirndi
- Reconstruction of: Mirndi languages

Proto-Mirndi reconstructions by Harvey (2008):

no.	gloss	Proto-Mirndi
1	to hang, to tip	*jalalang
2	high, up	*thangki
3	women's song style	*jarra(r)ta
4	that (not previously mentioned)	*jiyi
5	mother's father	*jaju
6	woman's son	*juka
7	bird (generic)	*ju(r)lak
8	blind	*kamamurri
9	daughter's child	*kaminyjarr
10	cold	*karrij
11	chickenhawk	*karrkany
12	bull ant	*(kija-)kija
13	to tickle	*kiji-kiji(k)
14	red ochre	*kitpu
15	shitwood	*kulinyjirri
16	dove sp.	*kuluku(ku)
17	sky	*kulumarra
18	throat, didgeridoo	*kulumpung
19	urine	*kumpu
20	firestick	*kungkala
21	pollen	*kuntarri
22	flesh	*kunyju
23	fat	*kurij
24	bush turkey	*kurrkapati
25	boomerang	*kurrupartu
26	club	*ku(r)turu
27	shield	*kuwarri
28	fire	*kuyVka
29	father-in-law	*lamparra
30	ear	*langa
31	bony	*larrkaja
32	plant sp.	*lawa
33	eagle	*lirraku
34	blue-tongue lizard	*lungkura
35	to return	*lurrpu
36	to wave	*mamaj
37	ear	*manka
38	plant sp.	*manyanyi
39	gutta percha tree	*manyingila
40	butterfly	*marli-marli
41	old man	*marluka
42	all right, later	*marntaj
43	human status term	*marntak
44	circumcision ritual	*marntiwa
45	upper leg, thigh, root	*mira
46	owl	*mukmuk
47	to be dark	*mu(wu)m
48	scorpion	*muntarla
49	string	*munungku
50	upper arm	*murlku
51	three	*murrkun
52	to name	*nij
53	hand	*nungkuru
54	female antilopine wallaroo	*ngalijirri
55	to lick	*ngalyak
56	to sing	*nganya
57	bauhinia	*ngapilipili
58	father's mother	*ngapuju
59	breast	*ngapulu
60	to be hot	*ngartap
61	bird sp.	*nyurijman
62	to dream	*pank(iy)aja
63	older brother	*papa
64	nightjar	*parnangka
65	young woman	*parnmarra
66	women's dance	*pa(r)ntimi
67	moon	*partangarra
68	baby	*partarta
69	hot weather	*parung(ku)
70	cicatrice	*pa(r)turu
71	scraper	*pin(y)mala
72	father	*pipi
73	snake (generic)	*pulany
74	to bathe	*pulukaj(a)
75	ashes	*puna
76	full	*punturr/tu
77	to finish	*purrp
78	dreaming	*puwarraja
79	deep (hole)	*tarlukurra
80	flame, light	*tili/u
81	to be tied up	*tirrk
82	feather	*tiya-tiya
83	to poke	*turrp
84	to open	*walk
85	woomera	*wa(r)lmayi
86	black-headed python	*warlujapi
87	strange(r)	*warnayaki
88	grass (generic)	*warnta
89	to scratch	*warr
90	number seven boomerang	*warratirla
91	freshwater crocodile	*warrija
92	to be together	*warrp
93	parrot sp.	*wilikpan
94	new	*yalang
95	initiated youth	*yapa
96	magic song	*yarrinti
97	young man	*yarrulan
