= Jaminjung language =

Mirndi language of Australia

Jaminjung
- Native to: Australia
- Region: Victoria River (Northern Territory)
- Native speakers: 29 (2016)
- Language family: Mirndi: Yirram; Jaminjung
- Dialects: Ngaliwuru

Language codes
- ISO 639-3: djd
- Glottolog: djam1255
- AIATSIS: N18 Jaminjung, N19 Ngaliwurru
- ELP: Jaminjung
- Ngaliwurru
- Jaminjung is classified as Severely Endangered by the UNESCO Atlas of the World's Languages in Danger.

Jaminjung is a moribund Australian language spoken around the Victoria River in the Northern Territory of Australia. There seems to be a steady increase in the number of speakers of the language with very few people speaking the language in 1967, about 30 speakers in 1991, and between 50 and 150 speakers in 2000.

In 1971, Frances Kofod and others published a grammar of the Ngaliwuru language, while in 2011 a book of Jaminjung & Ngaliwuru names and uses of plants & animals was published.

== Phonology ==
=== Vowels ===
Jaminjung has 4 vowels:

	Front	Central	Back
Close	i /i/		u /u/
Close-mid	e /e/		
Open		a /a/	

Vowel length is not distinctive. The close-mid vowel /e/ only appears in a small number of words, and is probably a loan from surrounding languages.

=== Consonants ===
Jaminjung has 18 consonants:

	Peripheral		Laminal		Apical	
	Bilabial	Velar	Palatal	Dental	Alveolar	Retroflex
Plosive	p /p/	k /k/	j /c/	th /t̪/	t /t/	rt /ʈ/
Nasal	m /m/	ng /ŋ/	ny /ɲ/		n /n/	rn /ɳ/
Trill					rr /r/	
Approximant			ly /ʎ/		l /l/	rl /ɭ/
Approximant	w /w/		y /j/		r /ɻ/	
