= Kamu people =

The Kamu, also known as Kamor, were an indigenous Australian tribe of the Northern Territory.

== Country ==
The precise area of Kamu territory has not yet been precisely delineated but it is broadly agreed that it took in a good part of the area around the Daly River Crossing and Tipperary Station , including in also the lower Fish River valley south of the Daly. This area in question is one that overlaps with the area where the Kamu language was known to be used .

== Language ==
The Kamu spoke Gamor/Kamu/Gamu, which has been considered variously as a dialect of Matngala, or as a distinct, if closely related, member of the Eastern Daly languages like Matngele, MalakMalak and Guwama. According to Stephen Wurm, writing prior to 2001, it had recently become extinct.

== Social organization ==
The Kamu were constituted by, as far as is known, by at least three clans, the last two of which no longer exist.

- The Dak Milngiyn A inhabited the area - The area north and east of Mount Hayward, and also that of the upper Reynolds River valley land.
- The Wak Garriyel were associated with the terrain from the Daly River Crossing north and west towards Wooliana.
- The Dak Milngiyn B dwelt around the area south and east of the Daly River Crossing.

== Native title ==
On the 31 March 1978 a claim was lodged in the name of the MalakMalak for native title rights over some 544 square kilometres of what is otherwise known as the Daly River Farms Rehabilitation Area. The case was formally presented and heard in 1981 and, the following year, Justice John Toohey determined

== Alternative names ==
- Kamor
- Gamy
- Kamorrkir
- Komorrkir
- Murra-Kamangee (?).

== Sources ==
- "Kamu (N33)". AIATSIS.
- Harvey, Mark David (1990). "A sketch grammar of Kamu" (PDF). Sydney.
- Sutton, P.; Palmer, A. (1981). The Daly River (MalakMalak) Land Claim. Northern Land Council.
- Tindale, Norman Barnett (1974). "Kamor (NT)". Aboriginal Tribes of Australia: Their Terrain, Environmental Controls, Distribution, Limits, and Proper Names. Australian National University. ISBN 978-0-708-10741-6.
- Toohey, John (1982). "Daly River (Malak Malak) Land Claim" (PDF). Australian Government Publishing Service.
- Wurm, Stephen (2007). "Australasia and the Pacific". In Moseley, Christopher (ed.). Encyclopedia of the world’s endangered languages. Routledge. pp. 425–577. ISBN 978-0-7007-1197-0.
- Zandvoort, Franklin D. (1999). A grammar of Matngele (PDF) (Thesis). University of New England.
