= Djerait =

Australian indigenous people

The Djerait were an indigenous Australian people of the Northern Territory

== Language ==
The Djerait language was said to have been mutually intelligible with that of the Mulluk-Mulluk who spoke a Daly river language, being as distant as ancient Greek dialects were to each other. And it was also said to be interchangeable with that spoken by the Pongaponga.

== Country ==
According to Norman Tindale, the Djerait occupied some 500 square miles (1,300 km^{2}) of tribal land on the north shores of Anson Bay, extending north to Point Blaze. Neighbouring tribes were the Mulluk-Mulluk, the Madngella the Pongaponga and the Wogait.

== People ==
The Jesuit missionary Donald Mackillop stated that the Djerait were a "small but intelligent tribe".

== Some words ==
- yinnung delluk (bamboo nose stick)
- wennu (conical helmet smeared with pipe clay and topped with a bone to which an emu plume is affixed)
- barang (dangerous night spirit, noseless and with blanks for facial eyes, with two organs on the back for seeing at great distances)

== Alternative names ==
- Tjerait
- Cherait, Cherite
- Sherait
- Jeerite
- Scherits
- Tjiras
- Paperbark natives

== Sources ==
- Basedow, Herbert (1907). "Anthropological notes on the Western Coastal tribes of the Northern Territory of South Australia". Transactions of the Royal Society of South Australia. 31. Adelaide: 1–62.
- Dahl, Knut (1926). In Savage Australia: An Account of a Hunting and Collecting Expedition to Arnhem Land and Dampier Land (PDF). London: P. Allen & Sons. pp. 72–98.
- Eylmann, Erhard (1908). Die Eingeborenen der Kolonie Südaustralien (PDF). Berlin: D.Reimer.
- Foelsche, Paul (1895). "On the Manners, Customs, etc., of some Tribes of the Aborigines, in the neighbourhood of Port Darwin and the West Coast of the Gulf of Carpentaria, North Australia". The Journal of the Anthropological Institute of Great Britain and Ireland. 24. Adelaide: 190–198. JSTOR 2842215.
- Mackillop, Donald (1893). "Anthropological notes on the aboriginal tribes of the Daly River, North Australia" (PDF). Transactions of the Royal Society of South Australia. 17. Adelaide: 254–264.
- Stanner, W. E. H. (June 1934). "Ceremonial Economics of the Mulluk Mulluk and Madngella Tribes of the Daly River, North Australia. A Preliminary paper (continued)". Oceania. 4 (4): 458–471. doi:10.1002/j.1834-4461.1934.tb00122.x. JSTOR 27976164.
- Tindale, Norman Barnett (1974). "Djerait (NT)". Aboriginal Tribes of Australia: Their Terrain, Environmental Controls, Distribution, Limits, and Proper Names. Australian National University. ISBN 978-0-708-10741-6. Archived from the original on 20 March 2020.
