= Kuwema language =

Kuwema (Kuwama) may refer to:

- Tyaraity language
- Kandjerramalh language
