= Wulwulam =

The Wulwulam, also known as the Woolwonga, were an indigenous Australian people of the Northern Territory. They are reputed to have been almost completely exterminated in the 1880s in reprisal for an incident in which some members of the tribe speared 4 miners.

== Country ==
Wulwulam land extended over some 1,900 square miles (4,900 km^{2}) from the headwaters of the Mary River westwards as far as Pine Creek, and southwards almost to Katherine. On their eastern flank, their boundary lay at the source of the South Alligator River. They were also reported in the Mount Bundy area.

== People ==
According to Norman Tindale, the Norwegian ethnographer Knut Dahl was referring to the Wulwulam in those passages where he wrote of the Agigondin, a central tableland tribe and a horde called the Agoguila. (Note: Dahl put the Agigondin on the Central Tableland, and the Agoguila at the Katherine River. (Dahl 1926, pp. 15, 229, 239))

== History of contact ==
The Wulwulam's numbers grew as a result of the rapid reduction of members of two tribes to their south and west as European colonization developed, namely the Agikwala, Awinmul and Awarai. Remnants of the two were absorbed into the Wulwulam as subtribal hordes.

== History ==
Copper mining discovered near Mt. Haywood in 1882 led to the development of a settlement on tribal lands along the Daly River soon afterwards, and members of the Wulwulam tribe were drawn to the site and employed there. Starting on 3 September 1884, several Wulwulam murdered four European settlers and in a reprisal known as the Coppermine massacres. (Note: These five men lived there for some time, built a small house, worked the mine, and came gradually into contact with the natives, who finally for a small payment in tobacco and flour were employed in the mine. All went well at first. Whether it was over women the catastrophe occurred or simply from the natives' hatred of the white man or their greed for provisions, I am unable to tell. Pretending to have found gold, some of the blacks decoyed Harry Houshield into the mountains. In the evening when he lay under his mosquito net the blacks sneaked up and half stunned him with a stick. Drawing his revolver he tried to get out of the net to fire, but his horse-boy Nammy, who had been with him for many years, drove a stone spear through his chest, killing him. In the meantime the others were working as usual in the mine, each in his own prospecting shaft. Suddenly the blacks rose to a man and speared their masters. As the white men did not drop at once, the blacks fled. Hellfirc Jack did not go far before he succumbed. Oxoll and Noltenius took refuge in the house, the one with a couple of spears through his stomach, the other with a spear through the lung. Jack Koberts had been digging in a hole when the black who was helping him struck him with a pick, hitting him a slanting blow on the side of the head. Jack fell and the black man ran away. The day wore on. The blacks hid in the forest, not daring to approach before their victims were dead. Night fell; Oxoll died, and Noltenius sat alone, the blood oozing from his spear wound. At last he stole out and began to crawl the 40 miles separating him from the old Daly cattle station which we had passed on our way out. At night-fall also Jack Koberts came to his senses again. Looking cautiously round for his fellows, he found the dead bodies, and weak and staggering started on the same trail as Noltenius, ignorant of course as to the latter's fate. Trudging on the next day he met some of the blacks who had murdered Houshield, and who were riding his horses to reach the copper mine and to share in the plunder. Not knowing what had befallen Houshield, Roberts only took the horses he required, and so reached the cattle station. On the following day the manager of this station. (Mr. Saxe) rode out to the mine, after sending a message to some people living on the telegraph Line. At the lagoon, later named after him, they found Noltenius dying, more than seven miles from the mine. (Dahl 1926, pp. 32–33)) George Montagu (Note: 'In 1884 the leader of one extermination party against Aborigines, Corporal George Montagu, concluded, 'One result of this expedition had been to convince me of the superiority of the Martini-Henry rifle, both for the accuracy of aim and quickness of action. The Northern Territory Times thought Montagu's exploits jolly fun and versified: These white men with their loaded guns Make black men scarce as married nuns.'The same newspaper also stated that the dead white men had made a mistake in being 'too kind' for they met their ends 'at the hands of a race of creatures resembling men in form, but with no more trace of human feeling in their nature than Siberian wolves'. or alternatively, that 'their natures are as dangerous as the venomous serpent, even, as every man will crush a snake under his heel, so must the hand of every man be raised against a tribe of inhuman monsters, whose cowardly and murderous nature renders them unfit to live) led the police reprisal party and made an official report about his parties reprisal actions and stated that 20 to 30 Aboriginal people had been killed; the Protector of Aborigines Dr R. J. Morice estimated that the number was around 150. Montagu's report drew significant press coverage and resulted in a board of enquiry being held by the South Australian government in 1886.

Francis Herbert Sachse who ran a cattle station and also managed the mine, led the massacre at Blackfellow Creek, where an estimated 150 people were shot, leading to their effective extermination. The Norwegian ethnographer Knut Dahl, who lived for over a year in the area a decade later, wrote as follows:

The sequel, which in the Australian bush has always followed such murders, occurred in due course... Another gathering of white men, friends and fellows of the victims, also embarked upon a campaign of vengeance against the Wolwanga tribe, which had been responsible for the deed. The reports on this campaign vary, but participants have told me that after a long search they finally found a great portion of the tribe gathered at the abandoned mine. They surrounded them, drove them into a lagoon, and shot them all, men, women and children.

The pogrom continued for some years, enfeebling what had been the most powerful Daly river tribe, and also decimating the Mulluk-Mulluk tribe.

Four Wulwulam men, Tommy, Jimmy, Daly, and Ajibbingwagne, were put on trial for the killings of 4 settlers, Johannes Lubrecht Noltenius, Jack Landers (known as Hellfire Jack), Henry Houschildt and Schollert. The Jesuit mission diary records Sachse as still waging his campaign against the Wulwulam 4 years later, in 1888.

Charlie Yingi, known as Long Legged Charlie, one of the four Aboriginal men charged for the killings, was cleared eventually and settled at the Jesuit Mission on the Daly River. He was later sentenced to death for the Coppermine killing.

In 2014 there came to light a document indicating that one child of Wulwulam/Woolwonga parentage had been registered in the census undertaken in 1889, and that by virtue of this fact, her descendants moved to assert native title rights to the old Wulwulam hunting grounds.

== Alternative names ==
- Agigondin (eastern horde)
- Agikwala, Agiqwolla, Agoguila, Aquguila
- Agiwallem
- Agrikondi, Aggraakúndi
- Oolwunga Oolawunga
- Wolwongga, Wulwanga, Wolwanga, Wulwonga, Woolwonga

Source: Tindale 1974, p. 238

== Sources ==
- "Court Proceedings". The Northern Territory Times & Gazette. 27 December 1884.
- Dahl, Knut (1926). In Savage Australia: An Account of a Hunting and Collecting Expedition to Arnhem Land and Dampier Land (PDF). London: P. Allen & Sons. pp. 72–98.
- "Daly River Massacres". Centre For 21st Century Humanities.
- Headon, David (1988). "'The Coming of the Dingos':Black/White Interactions in the Literature of the Northern Territory". In Nelson, Emmanuel Sampath (ed.). Connections:Essays on Black Literatures. Aboriginal Studies Press. pp. 25–40. ISBN 978-0-855-75186-9.
- Ganter, Regina (2015). "German Missionaries in Australia: Daly River (1886-1899)". Griffith University.
- Harris, John (2008). "George Montagu(1843-1904)". In Carment, David; Edward, Christine; James, Barbara; Maynard, Robyn; Powell, Alan; Wilson, Helen (eds.). Northern Territory Dictionary of Biography. Charles Darwin University Press. ISBN 978-0-980-45781-0.
- Lines, William J. (1991). Taming the Great South Land:A History of the Conquest of Nature in Australia. University of California Press. ISBN 978-0-520-07830-7.
- "The Northern Territory Enquiry re: Corporal Montagu's report". Northern Territory Times And Gazette. Vol. XI, no. 645. 20 February 1886. p. 2 – via National Library of Australia.
- "Corporal Montagu's evidence". The North Australian (Northern Territory). Vol. III, no. 41. 12 March 1886. p. 3 – via National Library of Australia.
- Parkhouse, T. A. (1895). "Native tongues in the neighbourhood of Port Darwin". Transactions of the Royal Society of South Australia. 19: 1–18.
- Purtill, James (25 September 2014). "'Forgotten' Woolwonga tribe demand recognition 130 years after 'extermination')". ABC News.
- Reid, Gordon (1990). A Picnic with the Natives: Aboriginal-European Relations in the Northern Territory to 1910. Melbourne University Press. ISBN 978-0-522-84419-1.
- Roberts, Henry (20 February 1886). "The Murders at the Daly River Copper Mine: Statement of the Sole Survivor". South Australian Weekly Chronicle – via Trove.
- Spencer, Baldwin (1914). Native tribes of the Northern Territory of Australia (PDF). London: Macmillan Publishers.
- Stanner, W. E. H. (December 1933). "Ceremonial Economics of the Mulluk Mulluk and Madngella Tribes of the Daly River, North Australia. A Preliminary Paper". Oceania. 4 (2): 156–175. doi:10.1002/j.1834-4461.1933.tb00098.x. JSTOR 40327457.
- Tindale, Norman Barnett (1974). "Wulwulam (NT)". Aboriginal Tribes of Australia: Their Terrain, Environmental Controls, Distribution, Limits, and Proper Names. Australian National University. Archived from the original on 21 March 2018.
- Wells, Samantha (2003). Negotiating Place in Colonial Darwin Interactions between Aborigines and whites, 1869-1911 (PDF) (Thesis). University of Technology Sydney.
