= George Montagu (police officer) =

Australian police officer (1843–1904

George Montagu (14 February 1843 – 26 August 1904) was a police officer who worked for much of his career in the Northern Territory of Australia while serving with the South Australia Police.

He was involved in a series of massacres of Aboriginal Australians including at Mole Hill and in the Daly River Region. His actions during the massacres in the Daly River led to a formal enquiry into his actions by the South Australia government in 1886 which found him innocent of wrongdoing.

== Early life ==
Montagu was born in Ireland and after his marriage he migrated to Australia where he settled in South Australia.

== Career as a police officer ==
On 16 July 1868, Montagu joined the South Australian Police Force as a third-class trooper; in his early years he spent time at several locations throughout the state until he was transferred to the Northern Territory on 8 August 1873 and was based in Darwin. While in the Northern Territory Montagu was still employed by the South Australian police as this was during the period that South Australia administered the Northern Territory.

From 12 July to 4 September 1875, Montagu was involved in a massacre at Mole Hill (Gunduburun/Goondburoon) which lead to the death of approximately 40 Mangarayi people; this massacre was in response to the killing of the Overland Telegraph Line staff at the Daly River Telegraph Station; more recent estimates by Tony Roberts puts this number at 150-200. Inspector Paul Foelsche, who had authorised the reprisals, called the massacres "a picnic with the natives".

On 1 August 1884 ,Montagu was promoted to corporal and, immediately following this, was involved in a series of massacres in the Daly River region. These massacres took place in reprisal for the murder of three copper mine workers John Landers, Harry Hauschild and Johannes Noltenius, as well as Thomas Schollert who was the camp cook by Aboriginal people on 3 September 1884. The first massacre, which is often referred to as the Coopermine Massacre, killed Mulluk-Mulluk, Murrinh-Patha and Woolwonga men, women and children. It was a persistent belief of Aboriginal people in the region that the murders of the four European men where, in themselves, in retaliation for assaults on Aboriginal women.

In reporting back on the massacres Montagu, who was in charge of the official police party, stated that there were only 20 to 30 Aboriginal deaths but more contemporary reports suggest that number is closer to 150 people or even 200, or higher, and is credited with decimating their populations and wiping out the Woolwonga population.

In another act of reprisal for the same murders, at least six Ngan'gimerri people were killed at Argument Flat on 27 September 1884; it is unclear, however, whether Montagu was directly involved in this incident.

Reporting on these massacres soon drew the attention of the press, particularly after damning comments made by Robert Morice, the Northern Territory's colonial surgeon and Protector of Aboriginals, who revealed the size and scale of the attacks. This led to significant outrage in the press, much of which was addressed directly to Montagu, with the Evening Journal stating:

We have no hesitation in saying that the cold-blooded manner in which Corporal Montague and his associates murdered these unhappy wretches is a disgrace to him, a disgrace to the community, and an outrage upon the civilization about which we boast. The story of the expedition reads like an extract from the history of the Spanish conquest of Mexico. Corporal Montagu may well have concluded his report with the words we have quoted. His was a butchering expedition, and the unfortunate victims were mere targets.

— Evening Journal (Adelaide) 14 November 1885

Despite this, papers in the Northern Territory continued to defend Montagu and called the 'southern press' "a pack of drivelling idiots" and "holy howlers", arguing that Montagu had taken "meted out a well-deserved punishment" and that the community should thank him. This controversy led to an inquiry being held into the incident/s in 1886 which found Montagu innocent of any wrongs. Montagu and the other men involved in the massacres denied that they had seen any dead bodies in their punitive expedition (despite what was clearly stated in Montagu's report).

Shortly after this he was transferred back to Adelaide where he worked in several different police stations, including at Murray Bridge, Mount Gambier and Kapunda until his resignation on 31 October 1902.

== Later life and death ==
After his resignation from the police force, Montagu moved to Victoria where he worked for some time as an auctioneer in Lilydale.

He died on 26 August 1904 in Fitzroy, a suburb of Melbourne.
