= Litchfield Station =

Pastoral lease in the Northern Territory, Australia

Coordinates: 13°25′40″S 130°29′37″E

Location in Northern Territory

Litchfield Station is a pastoral lease that operates as a cattle station. It is located about 44 kilometres (27 mi) north west of Daly River and 69 kilometres (43 mi) west of Adelaide River in the Northern Territory of Australia. Composed primarily of open grazing land, the property occupies an area of 1,336 square kilometres (516 sq mi). The two adjoining sister properties are Elizabeth Downs and Tipperary Stations; all three currently operate as a single entity, often referred to as the Tipperary Group.

== Description ==
The property is stocked with approximately 12,000 head of Brahman cattle, with a capacity of 15,000, and is broken up into 28 paddocks with an average size of 47 square kilometres (18 sq mi). Litchfield shares 12 holding paddocks, 6 permanent steel yards, 15 bores and a bitumen airstrip with neighbouring Tipperary. There are numerous watering points in the form of creeks, springs and swamps scattered around the property; these can dry up before the onset of the wet season, making the cattle dependent on bores for a small part of the year. A 25,000-hectare (61,776-acre) floodplain that contains para grass and marine couch backed onto the Daly River mouth makes up part of Litchfield. The forested higher country is bound by the Reynolds River, which is the boundary of Litchfield National Park.

== History ==
Litchfield was acquired by Melbourne-based barrister Alan Myers QC in 2003 for A$50 million along with the 80,000 cattle. Myers also acquired Tipperary, Fish River and Elizabeth Downs Stations.

The Australian Agricultural Company offered A$105 million to acquire Tipperary and Litchfield stations along with the 60,000 head of cattle in 2009, but the shareholder voted against the acquisition at an extraordinary general meeting held three months later.

In 2011, Australian Agricultural company purchased the Tipperary group's cattle herd of 53,000 head for A$26 million, and also entered a one-year agreement to use the station group for agistment purposes with options to extend.

David Warriner, the head of the Northern Territory Cattlemen's Association, was still managing the group in 2012, when it was stocked with 70,000 cattle raised for live export to Indonesia.

== See also ==
- List of ranches and stations
