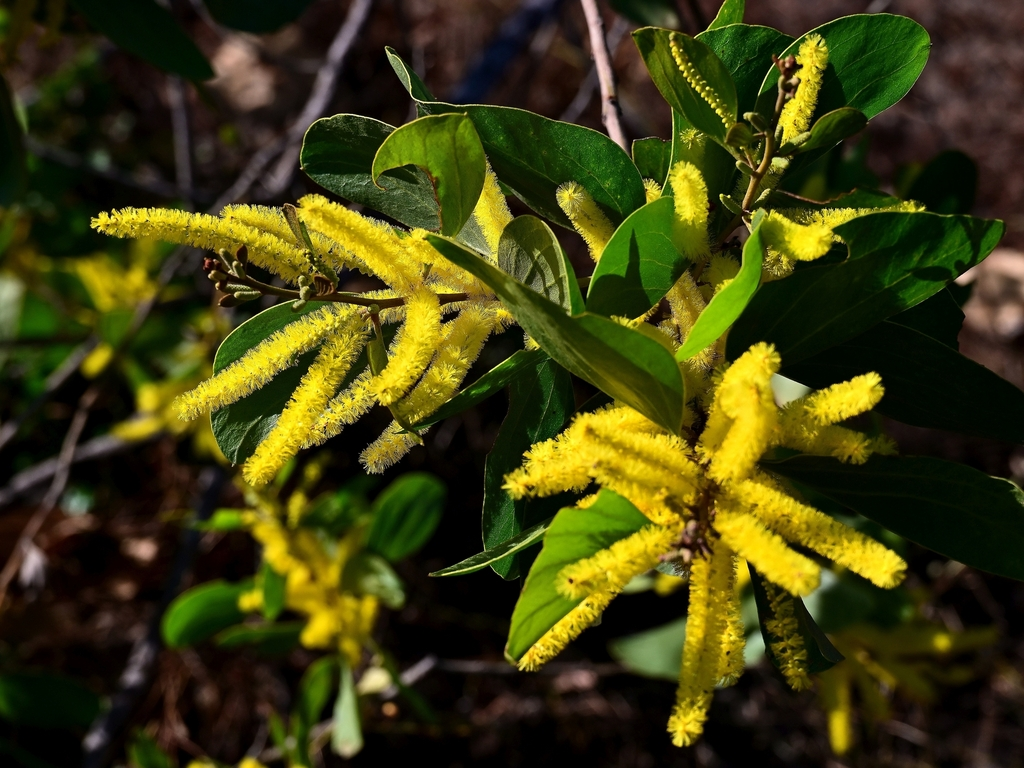

Conservation status
- Least Concern (TPWCA)

Scientific classification
- Kingdom: Plantae
- Clade: Tracheophytes
- Clade: Angiosperms
- Clade: Eudicots
- Clade: Rosids
- Order: Fabales
- Family: Fabaceae
- Subfamily: Caesalpinioideae
- Clade: Mimosoid clade
- Genus: Acacia
- Species: A. dimidiata

Binomial name
- Acacia dimidiata Benth.
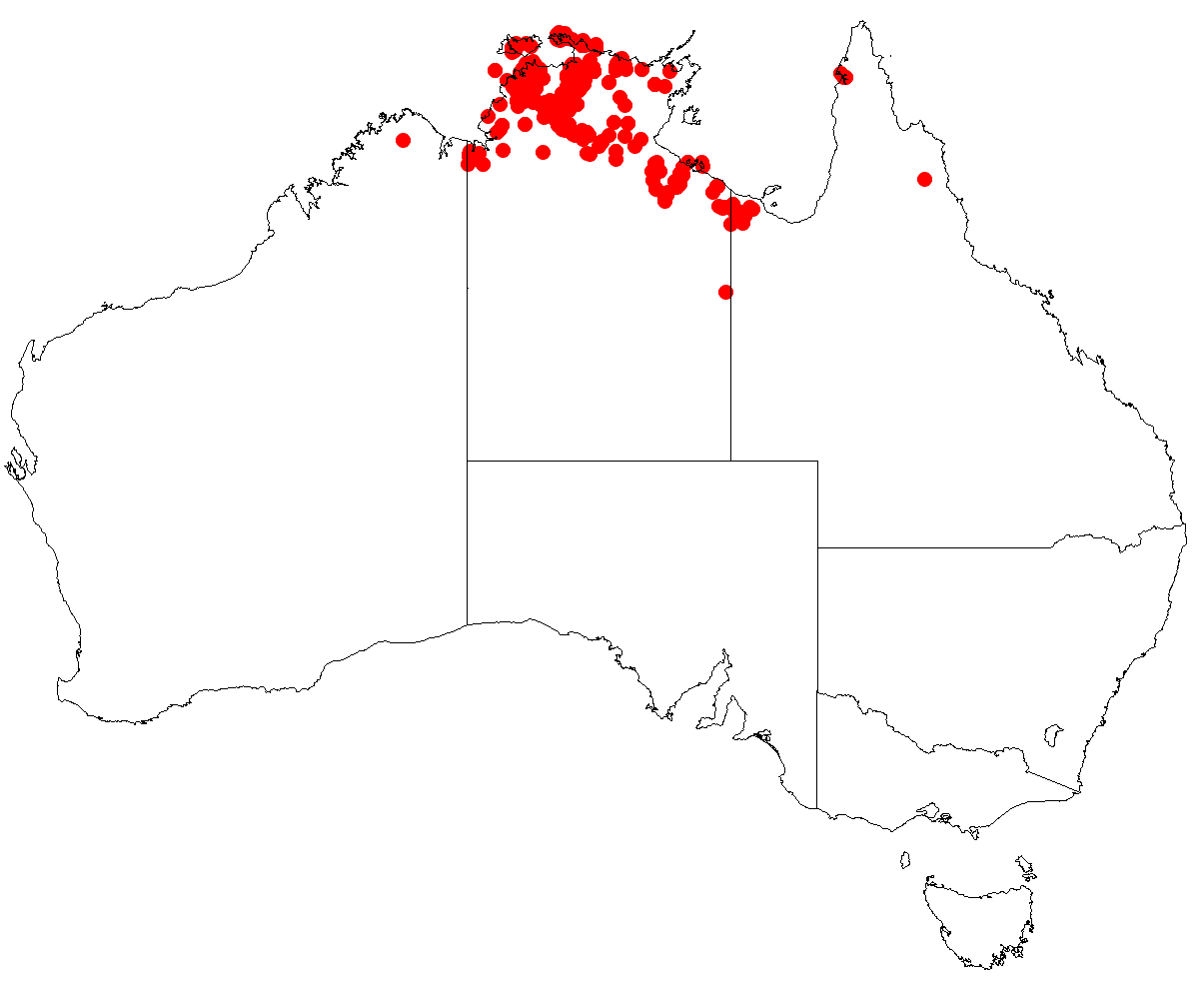
- Occurrence data from AVH

Synonyms
- Acacia dolabriformis A.Cunn. ex Hook. nom. illeg.; Acacia dimidiata var. dimidiata Benth.; Racosperma dimidiatum (Benth.) Pedley

= Acacia dimidiata =

Species of legume

Acacia dimidiata, commonly known as swamp wattle, is a species of flowering plant in the family Fabaceae and is endemic to northern Australia. It is a slender shrub or tree with corrugated bark, obliquely egg-shaped phyllodes with a rounded base, spikes of deep yellow to golden yellow flowers and more or less straight, crusty pods. It is also known as pari in the MalakMalak and Matngala languages, garninyjan in the Wagiman language, and as wirril in the Warray language.

== Description ==
Acacia dimidiata is a slender shrub or tree that typically grows to a height of 2–4 metres (7–13 ft) and has mottled grey bark, later corrugated brownish to dark grey bark. Its branchlets are yellowish, brown or grey-brown and densely covered with crisped or woolly hairs. The phyllodes are obliquely egg-shaped, flat, mostly 55–100 mm (2.2–3.9 in) long, 20–80 mm (0.79–3.15 in) wide with a rounded base and slightly sticky with four or five prominent veins and a gland near the base. There are narrowly triangular stipules about 2 mm (0.079 in) long at the base of the phyllodes. The flowers are deep yellow to golden yellow and borne in spikes 25–70 mm (0.98–2.76 in) long on peduncles up to 2 mm (0.079 in) long, the rachis hairy. Flowering has been recorded from March to October, and the pods are more or less straight, more or less terete, 55–155 mm (2.2–6.1 in) long, crusty and densely covered with soft hairs. The seed are oblong to narrowly oblong, 6.0–7.5 mm (0.24–0.30 in) long and brownish black to black.

== Taxonomy ==
Acacia dimidiata was first formally described in 1842 by George Bentham in Hooker's London Journal of Botany 1. The specific epithet ("dimidiata") means 'divided in half', referring to the phyllodes.

== Distribution and habitat ==
Swamp wattle grows in open eucalypt woodland in sandy soil over laterite in the Top End of the Northern Territory and the extreme north-west of Queensland.

== Conservation status ==
Acacia dimidiata is listed as of "least concern" under the Territory Parks and Wildlife Conservation Act and the Queensland Nature Conservation Act 1992.
