= Pungupungu language =

Pungupungu may refer to:

- Kandjerramalh language
- Tyaraity dialect of Malak-Malak
