= Ngan'gimerri =

Aboriginal Australian people

The Ngan'gimerri, also spelt Nangiomeri, Nanggumiri, and other variants, are an Aboriginal Australian people of the Daly River area in the Northern Territory.

== Language ==
Ngan'gimerri is one of the Southern Daly River languages, and considered a dialect of the Ngan'gi language.

== Country ==
Their traditional grounds lie to the east of those of the Maramanandji and Murrinh-Patha, extending some 1,000 square miles (2,600 km^{2}), south of the central sector of the Daly river, to the south of the Mulluk-Mulluk and Madngella. They ran along the Flora River up to its junction with the Daly.

== Post-contact history ==
In the traditional merbok trading system, the Ngan'gimerri furnished many other tribes with a particular and much prized large spearhead fashioned from the red granite in their Country.

Securing food for Aboriginal nomads was always a dicey business, and the attraction of areas where Europeans settled, as places where, through kinship with Indigenous people employed there, one could obtain surer supplies of food, tobacco and sugar, exercised a powerful influence on tribal shifts in Australia. Around the 1900s, taken in by Bush Telegraph rumours of marvels to be seen at a new gold mine, which had begun to operate at Fletchers Gully Mine southwards in what is now the Victoria Daly Region, they moved there together with the Wagiman people, and never looked back to return to their homeland.

According to Johannes Falkenberg, one horde of the tribe, known as the Ngargaminjin, assimilated with the Murrinh-Partha after the coming of white colonisation.

== Society and kinship ==
The Ngan'gimerri and their allies the Mulluk-Mulluk were bitter enemies of the Marringar and Marrithiyal tribes, though ceremonial obligations required them to cooperate in crucial ritual circumstances, such as the Dingiri style circumcision initiatory rite, Dingiri being a mythical hunter who sang himself into stone. Their kinship is based on the eight-subsection principle.

== Mythology ==
The Dreamtime figure of the rainbow serpent figures prominently among Daly River tribes, such as the Wagiman and the Marrithiyal for his role in stealing one of the wives of the flying fox, and suffering the consequences. In the Nangiomeri version, as with the Murrinh-Patha, the rainbow serpent is bisexual.

== Durmugan ==
The Australian anthropologist W. E. H. Stanner made the tribe famous by dedicating a paper to one particular member of the tribe, Durmugan, whom he first encountered while following a tribe he was living with, who he noticed had begun to adorn themselves in war-paint, to a full-scale battle, with over 100 warriors arranged in battle lines and hurling spears at each other. As he observed, his attention was drawn to one tall strikingly built skirmisher on the other side who displayed exemplary courage and prowess and stood out from the others. He was a Ngan'gimerri, who introduced himself once hostilities had ceased, and Stanner realized that he was in front of a man whom Europeans in the area called 'Smiler' with a repute for being 'the most murderous black in the region. Stanner interprets Durmugan's distinctive and powerful character in terms of an initiation he managed to undergo, despite his deracinated past, on the Victoria River, around the time of WW1. For those round Daly River the key myth of Angamunggi (the All-Father, Rainbow Serpent) had died off, as he was thought, in the midst of the rapid changes in their world, -the loss of land, disappearance of game and proliferation of deadly diseases- to have abandoned them. He was replaced by an emergent Kunapipi cult, an All-Mother represented by the bull-roarer Karwadi, which had been adopted from the earlier belief system. It was the stimulus of this new native messianic cult that, in Stanner's view, fired men like Durmugan to lead the lives they did.

Stanner's long memoir of Durmugan achieved some renown. Robert Manne described it as "the finest essay by an Australian" he had ever come across.

His name indicated a Murrinh-Patha connection, being a variant on a place-name, Dirmugam, in the latter Nangor clan's territory. His only equal, and, in dance, superior was a Murrinh-Patha warrior and trickster called Tjimari, whose story was given lustre after he made friends with the Australian poet Roland Robinson.

== Alternative names ==
- Nanggiomeri, Nangiomeri, Nangumiri
- Nangimera, Nangimeri
- Nanggiwumiri, Nangi-wumiri
- Ngen-gomeri
- Mariwumiri
- Murinwumiri
- Wumiri

== Sources ==
- Capell, A. (March 1940a). "Classification of languages in North and North-West Australia". Oceania. 10 (3): 241–272. doi:10.1002/j.1834-4461.1940.tb00292.x. JSTOR 40327769.
- Capell, A. (June 1940b). "Classification of languages in North and North-West Australia". Oceania. 10 (4): 404–443. doi:10.1002/j.1834-4461.1940.tb00304.x. JSTOR 40327866.
- Frazer, James George (2000) [First published 1937]. Totemica: A Supplement to Totemism and Exogamy. Collected Works of James G. Frazer. Vol. 7. Psychology Press. ISBN 978-0-700-71338-7.
- Green, Ian (September 1989). Marrithiyel, a language of the Daly River region of Australia's Northern Territory (PDF). ANU PhD.
- Grimes, Barbara (2003). "Daly River Languages". In Frawley, William (ed.). International Encyclopedia of Linguistics: AAVE-Esperanto. Vol. 1. Oxford University Press. ISBN 978-0-195-13977-8.
- Hinkson, Melinda (2010). "Thinking with Stanner in the present". Humanities Research. 16 (2): 75–92.
- Lévi-Strauss, Claude (1969). The Elementary Structures of Kinship. Beacon Press. ISBN 9780807096802.
- Maddock, Kenneth (1978). "Introduction". In Buchler, Ira R.; Maddock, Kenneth (eds.). The Rainbow Serpent: A Chromatic Piece. Walter de Gruyter. pp. 1–22. ISBN 978-3-110-80716-5.
- Manne, Robert (2011). "Introduction". The Dreaming and Other Essays. Black. ISBN 978-1-921-87018-7.
- Stanner, W. E. H. (June 1934). "Ceremonial Economics of the Mulluk Mulluk and Madngella Tribes of the Daly River, North Australia. A Preliminary paper (continued)". Oceania. 4 (4): 458–471. doi:10.1002/j.1834-4461.1934.tb00122.x. JSTOR 27976164.
- Stanner, W. E. H. (2011). The Dreaming and Other Essays. Black. ISBN 978-1-921-87018-7.
- Tindale, Norman Barnett (1974). "Nanggumiri (NT)". Aboriginal Tribes of Australia: Their Terrain, Environmental Controls, Distribution, Limits, and Proper Names. Australian National University. ISBN 978-0-708-10741-6.
