= Cyclone Mitchell (2026) =

Category 3 Australian region cyclone

Tropical Cyclone Mitchell
- Mitchell nearing the areas near Pilbara on 7 February

Meteorological history
- Formed: 29 January 2026
- Remnant low: 9 February 2026
- Dissipated: 10 February 2026

Category 3 severe tropical cyclone
- 10-minute sustained (Aus)
- Highest winds: 140 km/h (85 mph)
- Lowest pressure: 965 hPa (mbar); 28.50 inHg

Category 2-equivalent tropical cyclone
- 1-minute sustained (SSHWS/JTWC)
- Highest winds: 155 km/h (100 mph)
- Lowest pressure: 969 hPa (mbar); 28.61 inHg

Overall effects
- Fatalities: None
- Damage: $8.11 million (2026 USD)
- Areas affected: Northern Territory, Western Australia (particularly Kimberley, Pilbara, Barrow Island)
- Part of the 2025–26 Australian region cyclone season

Severe Tropical Cyclone Mitchell was a moderately strong tropical cyclone that affected portions of Northern Territory and Western Australia during February 2026. The ninth named storm of the 2025–26 Australian region cyclone season, Mitchell originated from a tropical low that formed over Northern Territory in the western end of Gulf of Carpentaria. On 29 January, the low was designated as Tropical Low 21U by the Bureau of Meteorology (BoM) and slowly began to move westward. Six days later, the low crossed into Western Australia and moved offshore the Kimberley coastline. On 6 February, the low quickly intensified into a category 1 tropical cyclone on the Australian scale and was assigned the name Mitchell. Mitchell began to move west-southwest, parallel to the Pilbara Coast and attained category 3 intensity the next day. Shortly after, Mitchell began to weaken while turning south and moving around the North West Cape. On 9 February, Mitchell made landfall near Shark Bay at category 1 intensity. Shortly after moving inland, Mitchell weakened to a tropical low while turning southeastward. Mitchell then dissipated on 10 February.

In anticipation of Mitchell, various tropical cyclone warnings and watches were issued for the Pilbara coast and upper west coast of Western Australia. Across the Pilbara Coast, flooding, downed trees, and minor property damage were reported. Strong winds cut power to nearly 2,000 properties in the Exmouth area and downed 50% of banana trees across Carnarvon. Losses from Mitchell totaled to AU$11.3 million (US$8.11 million).

== Meteorological history ==
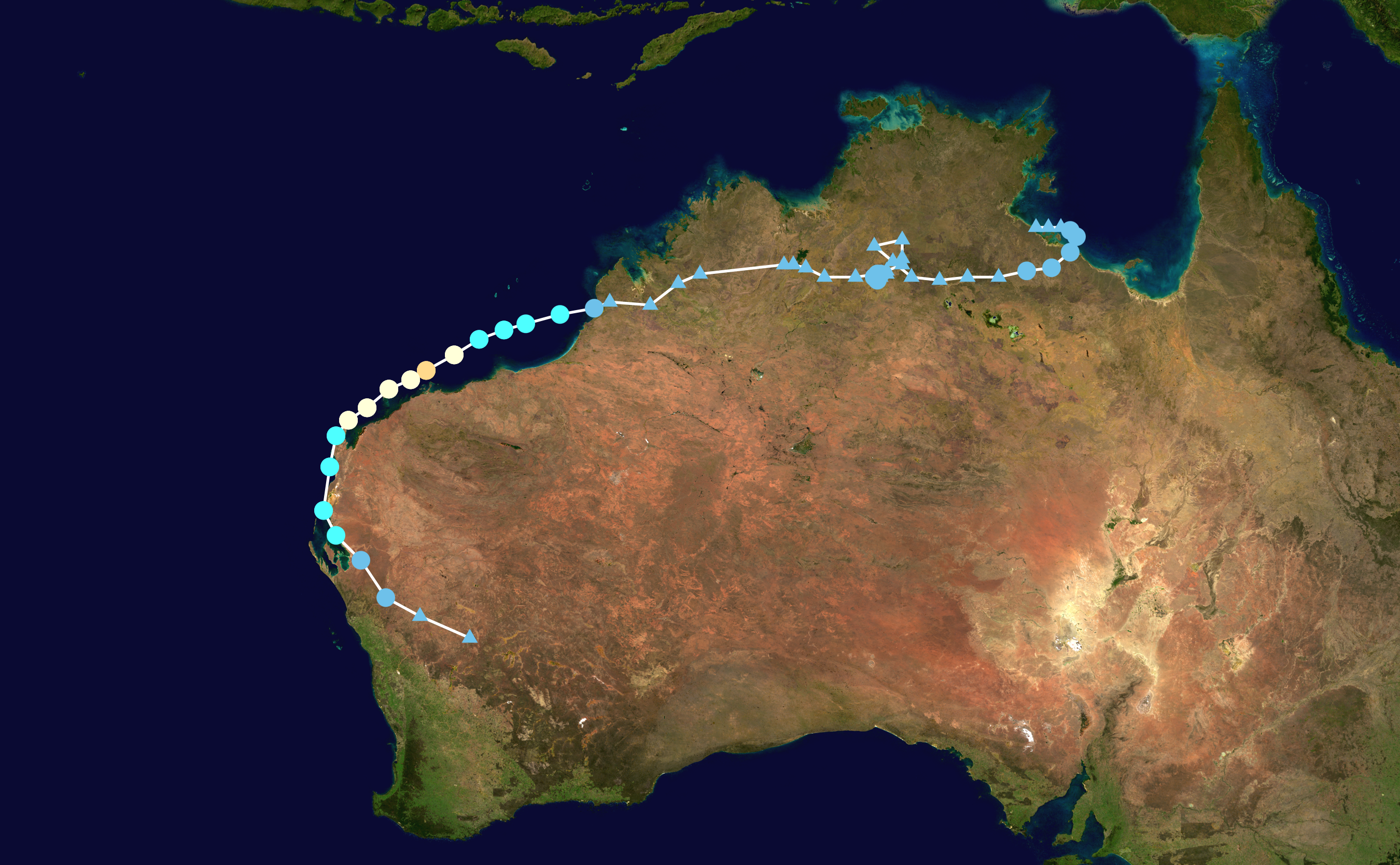
Map plotting the storm's track and intensity, according to the Saffir–Simpson scale Map key Saffir–Simpson scale Tropical depression (≤38 mph, ≤62 km/h) Tropical storm (39–73 mph, 63–118 km/h) Category 1 (74–95 mph, 119–153 km/h) Category 2 (96–110 mph, 154–177 km/h) Category 3 (111–129 mph, 178–208 km/h) Category 4 (130–156 mph, 209–251 km/h) Category 5 (≥157 mph, ≥252 km/h) Unknown Storm type Tropical cyclone Subtropical cyclone Extratropical cyclone, remnant low, tropical disturbance, or monsoon depression

On 29 January at 06:00 UTC, a tropical low, designated as Tropical Low 21U by the Bureau of Meteorology (BoM), formed over the Northern Territory in the western end of the Gulf of Carpentaria and began to move slowly westward. On 31 January, the low then executed a clockwise loop while over Northern Territory. On 5 February, the low moved offshore the Kimberley coastline north of Broome. On 6 February at 03:00 UTC, the Joint Typhoon Warning Center (JTWC) initiated advisories on the low, designating it as Tropical Cyclone 20S. On 6 February at 12:00 UTC, convection began to improve in the northern and western quadrants of the system, and the BoM upgraded the low to a category 1 tropical cyclone on the Australian scale and was assigned it the name Mitchell. Mitchell then began to intensify while moving west-southwest, parallel to the Pilbara Coastline.

Within an environment characterized by low vertical wind shear and warm sea surface temperatures, Mitchell began to rapidly intensify, with the JTWC noting that an eye-like feature beginning to appear on microwave imagery. On 7 February at 00:00 UTC, Mitchell attained category 2 intensity. However, Mitchell failed to maintain a persistent-eye like feature due to the presence of easterly vertical wind shear. At 18:00 UTC the same day, Mitchell attained category 3 intensity. Shortly after, Mitchell began to weaken as a result of dry air intrusion in the eastern side of the system. On 8 February, Mitchell weakened to category 2 intensity while turning south and moving around the North West Cape. Mitchell continued to weaken, with increasing wind shear all convection within the storm to diminish. Wind shear, land interaction, and cooler sea surface temperatures displaced the centre of Mitchell from its convection, causing the storm to weaken to category 1 intensity on 9 February at 00:00 UTC. At 15:00 UTC the same day, Mitchell crossed the coast south of Carnarvon near Shark Bay. At 18:00 UTC, Mitchell weakened to a tropical low while turning southeastward. On February 10 at 12:00 UTC, Mitchell dissipated.

== Preparations and impact ==
=== Western Australia ===
A cyclone emergency was issued for Exmouth while cyclone warnings were issued for of Shark Bay, Denham, and portions of the Pilbara coastline. In anticipation of Mitchell, 50 tourists at Cape Range National Park and the two caretakers of Thevenard Island were ordered to evacuate. Evacuated orders were also issued to five major oil, natural gas, and iron ore facilities along the Pilbara coast. Additionally, BCI Minerals employees were evacuated from a salt mine in Mardie Station. Evacuation centres were opened in Onslow, Karratha, Exmouth, Carnarvon, and Shark Bay. The North West Coastal Highway was temporarily closed to vehicular traffic, isolating Exmouth, Coral Bay, and Onslow. Across the Pilbara coast, operations were suspended at dozens of schools. Flights arriving in and departing out of Karratha were cancelled.

Mitchell brought strong winds and heavy rainfall to portions of the Pilbara Coast. Legendre Island reported a peak wind gust of 169 kilometres per hour (105 mph) while Barrow Island reported a wind gust of 149 kilometres per hour (93 mph). Gascoyne Junction received 132 millimetres (5.2 in) of rain while Shark Bay received 103.6 millimetres (4.08 in) of rain. Rainfall reached as far south as Perth.

Across the Pilbara Coast, strong winds downed trees and damaged fences, street signs, and vehicles, while heavy rainfall caused minor flooding and water ingress in homes. Strong winds from Mitchell cut power to nearly 2,000 properties in the Exmouth area and cut power to 80 properties in Karratha. Emergency services responded to around twenty weather-related emergency calls involving property damage and requests for assistance amid the cyclone. Strong winds damaged some homes in Monkey Mia. In the Port of Dampier, two recreational vessels sank during the cyclone. In Carnarvon, strong winds downed banana trees, causing the loss of 50% of the town's banana crop. One farmer lost 50% of their grapefruit and mango crop. Another farmer estimated that fourteen rows of table grape vines were damaged and sustained an economic loss of AU$40,000 (US$28,000) from Mitchell. Crop damage in Carnarvon from Mitchell was later compounded by Cyclone Narelle in March. However, rainfall from Mitchell was considered beneficial in some regions, helping alleviate drought conditions.

Remnant moisture from Mitchell triggered severe thunderstorms across the Wheatbelt and Goldfields regions. Several buildings sustained roof and siding damage as a result of the strong winds. In Lake Grace, strong winds tore off the roof of a pub. A freight route connecting Geraldton with several mining communities was damaged by floodwaters. Significant disruptions to the iron ore industry were reported as a result of port closures from Mitchell. Fortescue estimated a stock decrease of 1.16% as a result. Rio Tinto estimated that port closures from Mitchell contributed to the impediment of the shipment of 8 million tonnes of iron ore. Additionally, heavy rainfall from Mitchell impeded with the police search for a suspect in Gascoyne.

=== Northern Territory ===
While Mitchell passed through Northern Territory as a tropical low, it produced heavy rainfall over portions of the state leading to significant flash flooding. Between 300–500 millimetres (12–20 in) of rain fell in some areas, causing the Daly River to swell to major flood level, peaking at 14.26 metres (46.8 ft). About 450 residents in the Nauiyu Nambiyu Community were evacuated to Darwin as a result. Animal welfare teams were deployed to look after pets left behind in the evacuation.

Across the community, floodwaters inundated roadways, parks, and yards and left several areas without power, water, and cell service. Twenty homes were flooded. Communities in the West Daly region were left isolated after heavy rainfall flooded roads. Disaster payments up to AU$1,537 were offered to families for recovery efforts. Ten dogs and a cat were rescued from floodwaters. Crocodiles were sighted in flooded areas.

== See also ==
- Weather of 2026
- Tropical cyclones in 2026
- 2025–26 Australian region cyclone season
- List of storms named Mitchell
