= Ngolokwangga =

Australian aboriginal people

The Ngolokwangga are an Aboriginal Australian people of the Northern Territory.

== Language ==
The Ngolokwangga spoke Mulluk-Mulluk, one of the Daly languages.

== Country ==
The Ngolokwangga lay inland from the Pongaponga, and held sway over, according to Norman Tindale, an estimated 400 square miles (1,000 km^{2}) of territory running along both sides of the Daly River.

== People ==
It has been conjectured that the Yunggor may have been a clan of the Ngolokwangga. According to the 2006 Australian census, the Ngolokwangga numbered 37.

== Alternative names ==
- Ngulukwongga, Ngulugwongga
- Mulukmuluk, Mullukmulluk
- Malak Malak, Mallak-mallak, Malag-Malag, Mullik-mullik, Mollak-mollak, Malack-malack
- Djiramo (a horde name)
- Valli-valli (a native toponym for the lower Daly River)

== Sources ==
- Basedow, Herbert (1907). "Anthropological notes on the Western Coastal tribes of the Northern Territory of South Australia". Transactions of the Royal Society of South Australia. 31. Adelaide: 1–62.
- Dahl, Knut (1926). In Savage Australia: An Account of a Hunting and Collecting Expedition to Arnhem Land and Dampier Land (PDF). London: P. Allen & Sons. pp. 72–98.
- Eylmann, Erhard (1908). Die Eingeborenen der Kolonie Südaustralien (PDF). Berlin: D.Reimer.
- Foelsche, Paul (1895). "On the Manners, Customs, etc., of some Tribes of the Aborigines, in the neighbourhood of Port Darwin and the West Coast of the Gulf of Carpentaria, North Australia". The Journal of the Anthropological Institute of Great Britain and Ireland. 24. Adelaide: 190–198. JSTOR 2842215.
- Mackillop, Donald (1893). "Anthropological notes on the aboriginal tribes of the Daly River, North Australia" (PDF). Transactions of the Royal Society of South Australia. 17. Adelaide: 254–264.
- "Mullukmulluk". Denver: SIL International. 2018.
- Stanner, W. E. H. (June 1934). "Ceremonial Economics of the Mulluk Mulluk and Madngella Tribes of the Daly River, North Australia. A Preliminary paper (continued)". Oceania. 4 (4): 458–471. doi:10.1002/j.1834-4461.1934.tb00122.x. JSTOR 27976164.
- Tindale, Norman Barnett (1974). "Pongaponga (NT)". Aboriginal Tribes of Australia: Their Terrain, Environmental Controls, Distribution, Limits, and Proper Names. Australian National University. ISBN 978-0-708-10741-6.
