= Fish River Station =

- IUCN category II (national park)
- Location within Northern Territory
- Location: Northern Territory
- Nearest city: Daly River
- Coordinates: 14°11′21″S 130°52′53″E
- Area: 1,781 km^{2} (688 sq mi)
- Established: 2010
- Governing body: Nature Conservancy

Fish River Station is a protected area approximately 50 km (31 mi) south of Daly River and 150 kilometres (93 mi) south of Darwin in the Northern Territory of Australia.

It is bounded to the north and the east by the Daly River, to the west by the Wingate Mountains, and to the south by Dorisvale and Florina Stations.

The property was acquired in 2011 by the Indigenous Land Corporation in conjunction with the Nature Conservancy, Pew Environmental Group and the Australian Government's National Reserve System for A$13 million. The property was sold to the group by prominent Melbourne barrister Alan Myers.

The property encompasses lengths of the Daly River floodplain containing many billabongs and surrounded by pockets of rainforest, rugged ranges and fringed by savannah woodland.

The traditional owners of the area are the Wagiman, Labarganyan, Malak Malak and Kamu peoples. In 2011 after the property was acquired by the Indigenous Land Corporation the management was handed back to the traditional owners.

== See also ==
- Protected areas of the Northern Territory
- List of ranches and stations
