= Madngela =

The Madngella, otherwise known as the Matngala or Hermit Hill tribe, are an indigenous Australian people of the Northern Territory, Australia.

== Language ==
The Madngella spoke Matngele, one of the Eastern Daly languages, now extinct.

== Country ==
The Madngella lived traditionally in the middle and lower reaches of the Daly River nearby to the Mulluk-Mulluk people. Norman Tindale assigned to them some 100 square miles (260 km^{2}) of tribal land around Hermit Hill, and the area west of the Daly River, placing them to the southeast of the Yunggor people. The Pongaponga lay to their north.

== Social system ==
In the merbok system of ceremonial exchange, the Madngella used the words in a way that indicated the coastal provenance of the articles (ninymer) exchanged, north-easterly and south-westerly. Medrdokfrom the former direction was calledpork (Note: porkwas a variety of hooked spear which the Madngella obtained by cultural diffusion from the north-east) padaka, as opposed to the south-westerly merbok, called nim berinken, where berinken is a generic term used of tribes living south-west of the Madngella.

== Circumcision ==
A technique used in native medicine by the Madngella to heal infections to the penis after ritual circumcision had been performed was described by the Norwegian ethnographer Knut Dahl.

== History ==
The Madngella tribe had experienced intense culture shock in the wake of white settlement, whose effects over 50 years, according to who studied them in the early 1930s, had been to disintegrate many of their attachments to the traditional way of life.

Jesuit missionaries, after several endeavours to set up a station in the general area of the Daly River, eventually managed to establish a viable community at Hermit Hill.

== Alternative names ==
- Madngella
- Muttangulla
- Matngelli
- Hermit Hill tribe

== Sources ==
- "AIATSIS map of Indigenous Australia". AIATSIS.
- Dahl, Knut (1895). "Treatment after circumcision in the Hermit Hill tribe, Daly River, Northern Territory" (PDF). Transactions of the Royal Society of South Australia. 19: 122–123.
- Dahl, Knut (1926). In Savage Australia: An Account of a Hunting and Collecting Expedition to Arnhem Land and Dampier Land (PDF). London: P. Allen & Sons. pp. 72–98.
- Dixon, Robert M. W. (2002). Australian Languages: Their Nature and Development. Vol. 1. Cambridge University Press. ISBN 978-0-521-47378-1.
- Green, Ian (September 1989). Marrithiyel, a language of the Daly River region of Australia's Northern Territory (PhD thesis). Australian National University.
- MacKillop, Donald (1893). "Anthropological notes on the aboriginal tribes of the Daly River, North Australia" (PDF). Transactions of the Royal Society of South Australia. 17: 254–264.
- Stanner, W. E. H. (December 1933). "Ceremonial Economics of the Mulluk Mulluk and Madngella Tribes of the Daly River, North Australia. A Preliminary Paper". Oceania. 4 (2): 156–175. doi:10.1002/j.1834-4461.1933.tb00098.x. JSTOR 40327457.
- Stanner, W. E. H. (June 1934). "Ceremonial Economics of the Mulluk Mulluk and Madngella Tribes of the Daly River, North Australia. A Preliminary paper (continued)". Oceania. 4 (4): 458–471. doi:10.1002/j.1834-4461.1934.tb00122.x. JSTOR 27976164.
- Tindale, Norman Barnett (1974). "Madngela (NT)". Aboriginal Tribes of Australia: Their Terrain, Environmental Controls, Distribution, Limits, and Proper Names. Australian National University. ISBN 978-0-708-10741-6. Archived from the original on 20 March 2020.
