= Ngan'gi language =

Aboriginal language spoken in Australia's Northern Territory

Ngan'gi
- Ngan'gityemerri, Ngan'gikurunggurr
- Native to: Northern Territory, Australia
- Region: Mission, Tipperary Station, Flora and Daly rivers junction, Daly River
- Ethnicity: Ngan'gimerri and others
- Native speakers: 26; up to 200 (2016 census; Nick Reid)
- Language family: Southern Daly: Ngan'gi
- Dialects: Ngan'gikurunggurr; Ngan'giwumirri; Ngan'gimerri

Language codes
- ISO 639-3: nam
- Glottolog: nang1259
- AIATSIS: N157, N8, N17, N160
- ELP: Ngan'gityemerri

Ngan'gi, formerly known as Ngan'gityemerri, and also known as Ngan'gikurunggurr, Moil/Moyle, Tyemeri/Tyemerri, Marityemeri, and Nordaniman, is an Australian Aboriginal language spoken in the Daly River region of Australiaʼs Northern Territory. There are three mutually intelligible dialects, with the two sister dialects known as Ngen'giwumirri and Ngan'gimerri.

== Classification and alternative names and spellings ==
The first major study of Ngan'gi was Darrell Tryon's 1974 work, a broad discussion of Ngan'gi as one of a dozen or so "Daly Family languages". Tryon viewed Ngan'gikurunggurr and Ngen'giwumirri as two languages of the "Tyemeri subgroup" of the Daly family. The Daly Family was described as covering the area from the Daly River southwards to the Fitzmaurice River, comprising nine languages and fifteen dialects. Ngen'giwumirri was viewed as a dialect of Ngan'gikurunggurr, with which it shares approximately 84% of cognates, with the two forming the Tyemirri group of languages.

Ngangityemerri was a name used by linguists for the languages consisting of Ngan'gikurunggurr and Ngan'giwumirri now known as Ngan'gi.

Today Ngen'giwumirri and Ngan'gimerri (spoken by the Ngan'gimerri people) are seen as sister dialects, which are 90% cognate but distinct languages socio-linguistically (Reid & McTaggart, 2008). Ngan’gityemerri used to be used as a cover term for all three varieties, but more recently the term Ngan’gi has been adopted as standard practice.

The group of languages is classified with Murrinh-Patha as a Southern Daly family, a position not without problems; see Southern Daly languages for details.

Other names for the language include Moil, Tyemeri (Tyemerri), Marityemeri, Nordaniman. Moil/Moyle is a geographical term referring to the Moyle River.

The varieties of this language have been spelt differently in different sources, including Ngangikurrunggurr, Ngangikurongor, Ngangikarangurr, Ngangikurrungur, Tyemeri, Marityemeri [Tryon 1974]; Marri Sjemirri' (used by Marrithiyel speakers for Ngan'gikurunggurr, Moiil, Moil, Moyle, Moyl [Reid 1990]; Ngan'gikurunggurr, Ngankikurungkurr, Nangikurungguru, Nangikurungurr, Ngangikurrunggurr, Nangikurunurr, Tyemeri, Nangityemeri [Top End Handbook]; and Ngankikurungkurr [Hoddinott and Kofod 1988].

Sometimes it is referred to by the names it is called by neighbouring languages, such as Marityemeri, Marri Sjemirri and Murrinh Tyemerri.

== Speakers ==
Ngan'gi is spoken by about 150–200 people in the region around the Daly River, most of them living in the communities of Nauiyu (Daly River Mission), Peppimenarti, and Wudigapildhiyerr) and in a number of smaller outstations on traditional lands (such as Nganambala and Merrepen). Official census data, however, states only 26 at home speakers.

The Ngen'giwumirri dialect has around 30 speakers, but Ngan'gimerri is no longer spoken.

== Grammatical features ==
Ngan'gi is a non-Pama-Nyungan language with strong head-marking properties. It has 31 finite verbs, which combine with a large class of coverbs to form morphologically complex verb words with the type of information requiring a sentence to convey in English (including information about the subject, the object and other participants). Ngan'gi also has a system of 16 noun classes (including bound prefixes and free words), which exhibit agreement properties on modifying words.

== Phonology ==
Ngan'gi has sound features which are unusual by Australian standards, including a three-way obstruent contrast; it has two series of stops, as well as phonemic fricatives.

=== Consonants ===
Consonant inventory
	Bilabial	Apical	Laminal	Dorsal
Plosive	p b	t d	c	k
Fricative	ɸ	ʐ	ɕ	ɣ
Nasal	m	n	ɲ	ŋ
Lateral		l		
Flap/Trill		ɾ~r		
Approximant	w	ɹ̠	j	

Sound	Allophone
/p/	[p], [pʰ]
/t/	[t], [tʰ]
/d/	[d], [ɖ], [ɹ]
/c/	[c], [cʰ], [ɟ], [t̪], [d̪]
/k/	[k], [kʰ]
/ʐ/	[ʐ], [ʐ͡ɻ], [ɻ]
/ɕ/	[ɕ], [ʑ], [c͡ç]
/ɣ/	[ɣ], [x], [ɡ]
/n/	[n], [ɳ]
/ɲ/	[ɲ], [n̪]

=== Vowels ===
Vowel inventory
	Front	Back
High	i	u
Low	e	a

Sound	Allophone
/i/	[i], [ɪ]
/u/	[u], [ʊ], [ɔ]
/e/	[ɛ], [æ]
/a/	[ɑ], [ʌ]
/aj/	[äɪ]
/uj/	[oɪ]
/ej/	[eɪ]

In Ngan'gityemerri /a/ is a phonological back vowel rather than front or central vowel.

== Sources ==
- Alpher, Barry and Courtenay, Karen. Unpublished field notes: Alpher and Courtenay collected Ngan'gikurunggurr data whilst working at the School of Australian Linguistics (now part of the Batchelor Institute of Indigenous Tertiary Education) during the late 1970s. A word list (with some analysis of verbal morphology) is held in the institute's library.
- Callan, William. nd. A grammar of Ngankikurunguru. ms. AIATSIS, Canberra (44 pp): This manuscript quotes Tryon, which dates it to the early 1970s; includes some vocabulary and partial finite verb paradigm tables.
- Ellis, S.J. 1988. Sociolinguistic survey report: Daly region languages. In Ray, M.J. ed Aboriginal Language use in the Northern Territory: 5 reports. Work Papers of SIL-AAIB, B13. Darwin: SIL.
- Laves, Gerhardt. 1931. ms 2189. Unpublished fieldnotes on Ngan'gimerri. AIATSIS Library, Canberra. Laves was the first linguist to work on Ngan'gityemerri. In 1931 he collected some 200 pages of vocabulary, grammatical notes and (largely untranscribed) texts, in Ngan'gimerri, the speech variety of the now extinct rak-Merren patri-line. Laves returned to the USA later that year, and appears not to have published anything from his Australian data. His works, including detailed studies of Matngela, Karriyarri, Kumbaingir and Nyungar, were acquired by AIATSIS in 1986. Laves work is particularly interesting, both for the quality of the analysis, and the diachronic evidence it provides for changes within the Ngan'gi verb structure.
- Reid, N.J. "Class and Classifier in Ngan'gityemerri" in Harvey, M. and Reid, N. (eds), Nominal Classification in Aboriginal Australia. Amsterdam: John Benjamins, 1997.
- Reid, N.J. "Sit right down the back: serialized posture verbs in Ngan'gityemerri and other Northern Australian languages" in Newman, J. ed. Sitting, Lying and Standing: Posture verbs in typological perspective. John Benjamins: Amsterdam, 2002(a).
- Reid, N.J. "'Ken Hale would just love this': finding the 31st Ngan'gityemerri finite verb" in Simpson, J. Nash, D. Laughren, M. Austin, A. and Alpher, B. eds. Forty Years On: Ken Hale and Australian Languages. Pacific Linguistics: Canberra, 2002(b).
- Reid, N.J. "Languages of the World: Ngan'gityemerri". The Encyclopedia of Language and Linguistics II. Oxford: Elsevier, 2005.
- Tryon, Darrell. The Daly River Languages: a survey. Series A, 14. Canberra: Pacific Linguistics, 1968.
- Tryon, Darrell. "Noun Classification and Concord in the Daly River Languages". Mankind, Vol 7, 3 pp 218–222 (1970).
- Patricia Marrfurra McTaggart; Molly Yawalminny; Mercia Wawul; et al. (2014). "Ngan'gikurunggurr and Ngen'giwumirri plants and animals". Northern Territory Botanical Bulletin. 43. Wikidata Q106088130.
