= Wagaydyic languages =

Australian aboriginal languages

Wagaydyic
- Geographic distribution: Daly River
- Linguistic classification: Northern Daly ?
- Subdivisions: Wadjiginy (Wagaydy); Kandjerramalh (Pungupungu) †; ?Giyug †

Language codes
- Glottolog: None wadj1254 (covered by Wadjiginy)

The Wagaydyic languages (nowadays more often referred to as the Anson Bay languages) are a pair of closely related but otherwise unclassified Australian Aboriginal languages: the moribund Wadjiginy (also known as Wagaydy and Batjamalh) and the extinct Kandjerramalh (Pungupungu).

Tryon (1980) notes that the two languages are 79% cognate based on a 200-item wordlist, but there are serious grammatical differences that prevent them from being considered dialects of a single language.

The unattested Giyug may have been a dialect of Wadjiginy or otherwise related.

The Wagaydyic languages have previously been classified with Malak-Malak into a Northern Daly family, but similarities appear to be due to lexical and morphological borrowing from Malak-Malak, at least in Wadjiginy.

== Vocabulary ==
The following basic vocabulary items of Wadjiginy and Pungupungu are from Tryon (1968).

no.	gloss	Wadjiginy	Pungupungu
1	head	biǰæ	pœǰæ
2	hair	mæræbiǰæ	mæræpœǰæ
3	eyes	mibæ	mibæ
4	nose	wiǰa	wuǰæ
5	ear	bibara	pibæræ
6	tooth	diRæ	diRæ
7	tongue	ŋadal	ŋadal
8	shoulder	čælmæ	čælmæ
9	elbow	čin	čin
10	hand	ŋælæ	ŋælæ
11	breasts	wiŋ	wïŋ
12	back	bæbæra	raɲ
13	belly	dawara	wunæ
14	navel	ǰœrač	čœrač
15	heart	čœnmanaǰ	dœpmadœpma
16	urine	kæwælæč	kawalač
17	excrete	guk	kuk
18	thigh	bælæm	pædlæm
19	leg	kæræl	kæræl
20	knee	karaŋok	miraŋok
21	foot	čœt	čœt
22	skin	yæræɲ	yæræɲ
23	fat	wudæwæl	wœdawæl
24	blood	kawæɲ	kawaɲ
25	bone	bwik	bwik
26	man	ŋanaŋ	ŋanaŋ
27	woman	ŋawolaŋ	ŋawalaŋ
28	father	bapa	papalak
29	mother	kalaŋ	kalaŋ
30	grandmother	makaŋ	æčæ
31	policeman	wænæn	dukmækæ
32	spear	wælæra	wælæræ
33	woomera	kalan	kalan
34	boomerang	wiɲiŋgiɲ	wïɲïŋgïɲ
35	nullanulla	langur	langur
36	hair-belt	bulkaŋ	pulkaŋ
37	canoe	wutïŋge	winæ
38	axe	ličpuruk	ličpurp
39	dilly bag	wargade	waRgade
40	fire	wiɳ	win
41	smoke	wïɳgal	wungæl
42	water	wiyïk	wik
43	cloud	guk	pærk
44	rainbow	banaŋak	pulipuli
45	barramundi	pænŋat	pænŋæt
46	sea	ŋalgïn	ŋalgïn
47	river	čakaR	wikmagat
48	stone	maŋ	maŋ
49	ground	wut	wut
50	track	kal	kæl
51	dust	bœnaŋ	pœnaŋ
52	sun	gæyïk	kayïk
53	moon	kara	kalakkalak
54	star	mœrtæ	mœrta
55	night	ŋuraǰa	ŋurïnǰe
56	tomorrow	yiɲmæk	yiɲmæk
57	today	ŋaR	ŋær
58	big	pamalaŋ	pamalaŋ
59	possum	čædæræč	čaǰɛdač
60	dog	moyiɲ	moyiɲ
61	tail	kalpæ	kælpæ
62	meat	mæǰæm	mæǰæm
63	snake	kulgamalaŋ	walan
64	red kangaroo	muǰ	kænga
65	porcupine	nïminïŋač	mænɛŋɛč
66	emu	ŋœrœn	ŋœrœčul
67	crow	wak	wak
68	goanna	ŋaran	ŋaran
69	blue tongue lizard	bwikmidaŋ	wirič
70	mosquito	wœRaŋ	wœraŋ
71	sugar-bag	činæɲ	činiɲ
72	camp	rak	ræk
73	black	kalalk	kalalk
74	white	baybaymalaŋ	baybaymalaŋ
75	red	wïrewïre	wurewure
76	one	ŋanǰič	ŋanǰič
77	two	bakatamalaŋ	parkataŋgæɲ
78	when?	ænæɲ	anikinæ
79	what?	ɲinič	ɲinič
80	who?	naga	naga
81	I	ŋaǰa	ŋæǰæ
82	you	kænæ	kænæ
83	he	ǰamoyič	čamoyič
84	grass	wœrak	wœrak
85	vegetable food	mænæɲ	mænæɲ
86	tree	wiɳ	wiɳ
87	leaf	kalkal	kalkal
88	pandanus	ɲïŋarač	nurač
89	ironwood	mælæ	mælæ
90	ripe	baramuŋ	paramuŋ
91	good	čarakɔ	čarakɔ
92	bad	čalkma	čalkma
93	blind	kulyuk	kuluk
94	deaf	ŋamama	ŋamama
95	saliva	wudak	wudak

== See also ==
- Daly languages
