= Wadjiginy language =

Endangered Australian Aboriginal language

Wadjiginy
- Wogait
- Patjtjamalh
- Native to: Australia
- Region: Daly River
- Ethnicity: Wadjiginy
- Native speakers: 5 (2005)
- Language family: Wagaydyic: Wadjiginy

Language codes
- ISO 639-3: wdj
- Glottolog: wadj1254
- AIATSIS: N31
- ELP: Batjamalh
- Linguasphere: 28-fbb-a

Wadjiginy, also known as Wagaydy (Wogait) and Batjamalh, is an Australian Aboriginal language. Apart from being closely related to Kandjerramalh, it is not known to be related to any other language, though it has borrowed grammatical and lexical material from neighboring Northern Daly languages.

Wadjiginy was spoken in the Northern Territory.

Wadjiginy (Wadyiginy, Wagaydy, Wogaity) is the name of the people; this native language is Patjtjamalh (Batjamalh, Batytyamalh).

== Phonology ==
=== Consonants ===
	Peripheral		Laminal		Apical	
	Labial	Velar	Dental	Palatal	Alveolar	Retroflex
Stop	p~b	k~ɡ		c~ɟ	t~d	ʈ~ɖ
Nasal	m	ŋ		ɲ	n	ɳ
Lateral			l̪		l	ɭ
Rhotic					r	ɻ
Approximant	w			j		

- Voiceless stop sounds may also fluctuate to voiced sounds when in word-initial, intervocalic, post-nasal, and post-liquid positions.
- /k, p/ can also be heard as fricatives [ɣ], [β] when in intervocalic and post-liquid positions.
- /w/ can be heard as a bilabial approximant [β̞] when before front vowels /i, ɛ, ø/.

=== Vowels ===
	Front		Back
High	i	ø~y	ʊ
Mid	ɛ	ø~y	ʊ
Low	a		

- /ø/ can also be realized as a higher [y] sound as well as [ø].

Phoneme	Allophones
/i/	[i], [ɨ̞], [ɪ]
/ʊ/	[ʊ], [o]
/ɛ/	[ɛ], [ɜ]
/ø/	[ø], [y]
/a/	[a], [ä], [ɑ]

== Vocabulary ==
Capell (1940) lists the following basic vocabulary items:

gloss	Woːgaidj
man	ŋanan
woman	ŋoalaŋ
head	bödja
eye	miba
nose	widja
mouth	ŋaːg
tongue	ŋaːɖal
stomach	bɛnman
bone	big
blood	gavin
kangaroo	mudj
opossum	dadjädaid
crow	wagwag
fly	mul
sun	qeig
moon	qaɽa
fire	vin
smoke	wingar
water	wiːg
