= Southern Daly languages =

Language family

Southern Daly
- (generally accepted)
- Geographic distribution: Daly River region, northern Australia
- Linguistic classification: Language family
- Subdivisions: Murrinh-patha; Ngan’gityemerri

Language codes
- Glottolog: sout2772
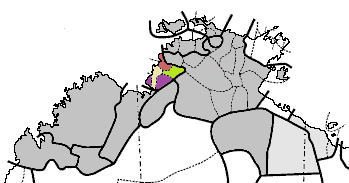
- The Daly languages (color), among the other non-Pama-Nyungan languages (grey)

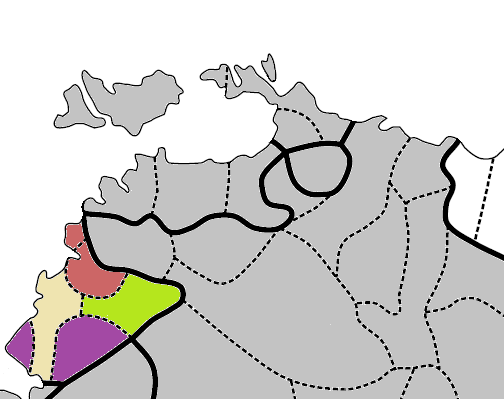
- Southern Daly languages. Murrinh-patha is on the coast, Ngan’gityemerri in the interior.

The Southern Daly languages are a family of two distantly related Australian aboriginal languages. They are:

- Southern Daly
  - Murrinh-patha (Murinbata)
  - Ngan’gityemerri (Ngan’gi)

== Classification ==
Southern Daly is a distant and problematic relationship. Murrinh-Patha was once thought to be an isolate, due to lexical data: It has, at most, an 11-percent shared vocabulary with any other language against which it has been compared. However, Murrinh-patha and Ngan’gityemerri correspond closely in their verbal inflections. Green (2003) makes a case that the formal correspondences in core morphological sequences of their finite verbs are too similar (in their complexities and their irregularities) to have come about through anything other than a shared genetic legacy from a common parent language. Nonetheless, lexically they have almost nothing in common, other than cognates in their words for 'thou' (nhinhi and nyinyi) and 'this' (kanhi and kinyi), and it is not clear what could explain this discrepancy.

== Vocabulary ==
The following basic vocabulary items are from Tryon (1968).

no.	gloss	Tyemeri	Ngengomeri
1	head	dæpe	dæpe
2	hair	wičæ	wuǰa
3	eyes	dæmoy	damoy
4	nose	dæši	dæče
5	ear	dæčære	dæčære
6	tooth	dædir	dædir
7	tongue	dæčæn	ŋalŋijiak
8	shoulder	tamæmbɛr	dada
9	elbow	mïnmïrpïr	dličiwuwul
10	hand	dæmæ	dæmæ
11	breasts	če	čiye
12	back	dædære	dædære
13	belly	dægæ	damarde
14	navel	dæčɛre	dæčɛre
15	heart	kækulkul	kækulgul
16	urine	waga	waga
17	excrete	ŋækïn	nïkïnmœr
18	thigh	dæbe	dæbe
19	leg	dagare	dagare
20	knee	dænïnǰe	dærɛnǰe
21	foot	dæᵽïr	dæbir
22	skin	agarᵽure	agaraburo
23	fat	aleye	adæwe
24	blood	ᵽæčæn	pučæn
25	bone	ame	ame
26	man	yæde	mipuR
27	woman	ᵽalme	palme
28	father	ŋača	ŋača
29	mother	kala	ala
30	grandmother	mæŋgæ	mæŋgæ
31	policeman	wamumur	wamɔmɔ
32	spear	yawul	yawul
33	woomera	yagama	yagama
34	boomerang	kuɲuŋuɲ	kuɲuŋuɲ
35	nullanulla	magulbe	magulbɔ
36	hair-belt	woyčær	wuǰa
37	canoe	yænïŋgïǰe	kænægïǰe
38	axe	bi	bi
39	dilly bag	waRgaRde	waRguduʔ
40	fire	yæŋge	yæŋge
41	smoke	tawan	dawan
42	water	kure	kurɔ
43	cloud	wɔ	wɔ
44	rainbow	aŋemuŋge	aŋamuŋgi
45	barramundi	ætælmær	awalaŋir
46	sea	kuruŋgur	kuričæwæ
47	river	diRpædær	kuripædæR
48	stone	ᵽæpe	pæpe
49	ground	ŋičir	ŋičïr
50	track	mumba	mumba
51	dust	baᵽun	pabun
52	sun	mire	mïre
53	moon	diwin	diwiɳ
54	star	ŋanimæ	ŋanimær
55	night	kulče nïmbe	ŋaniŋeye
56	tomorrow	ŋuɲananïŋge	wadænige
57	today	dæčaŋe	čawɔrɔ
58	big	kæRæ	yɛrmïnbade
59	possum	awuye	awuye
60	dog	wowo	wowo
61	tail	akïme	dapuR
62	meat	kagɔ	kagɔ
63	snake	æƀæŋgo	abæŋgo
64	red kangaroo	amače	amače
65	porcupine	aŋaneƀiɲe	aŋaneƀiɲi
66	emu	ŋuRp	kɔmɔɛnǰil
67	crow	awaŋge	awak
68	goanna	æmængïɲ	mængiɲ
69	blue tongue lizard	æƀære	æbære
70	mosquito	aƀuŋe	aƀuŋe
71	sugar-bag	pïŋgïlǰa	puŋgudluʔ
72	camp	dædæ	dædær
73	black	čipma	čipma
74	white	bwimaŋgare	boymæm
75	red	ᵽïlᵽïlŋïne	pïlbïlŋïne
76	one	wokumæ	wuŋguwæ
77	two	fagare	wagare
78	when?	æčæ	æčæ
79	what?	čagane	čagane
80	who?	kænæ	kænæ
81	I	ŋaie	ŋaie
82	you	ɲiɲi	ɲiɲi
83	he	næm	næm
84	grass	wurɔ	wuR
85	vegetable food	meye	miye
86	tree	yæwɛR	yawuR
87	leaf	merïŋge	mirïŋge
88	pandanus	yærïge	yærge
89	ironwood	mawuɲ	mawuɲ
90	ripe	mibin	mibin
91	good	yubɔ	yubɔ
92	bad	wulæk	wulæk
93	blind	palakɲim	tarawɔrɔ
94	deaf	ŋamama	waŋamama
95	saliva	čarawɔ	čæræwul

== See also ==
- Daly languages
