= Pongaponga =

The Pongaponga were an indigenous Australian people of the Northern Territory. They may have been a band of the Ngolokwangga.

== Country ==
Norman Tindale estimated their tribal land's extent at about 200 square miles (520 km^{2}). They inhabited the area along both banks of the Daly River somewhat inland from the Wogait coastal tribe.

== Alternative names ==
- Pongo-pongo
- Djiramo (?) (Note: According to Herbert Basedow this ethnonym referred to a horde of the Mulukmuluk)

== Sources ==
- Basedow, Herbert (1907). "Anthropological notes on the Western Coastal tribes of the Northern Territory of South Australia". Transactions of the Royal Society of South Australia. 31. Adelaide: 1–62.
- Dahl, Knut (1926). In Savage Australia: An Account of a Hunting and Collecting Expedition to Arnhem Land and Dampier Land (PDF). London: P. Allen & Sons. pp. 72–98.
- Eylmann, Erhard (1908). Die Eingeborenen der Kolonie Südaustralien (PDF). Berlin: D.Reimer.
- Foelsche, Paul (1895). "On the Manners, Customs, etc., of some Tribes of the Aborigines, in the neighbourhood of Port Darwin and the West Coast of the Gulf of Carpentaria, North Australia". The Journal of the Anthropological Institute of Great Britain and Ireland. 24: 190–198. JSTOR 2842215.
- Mackillop, Donald (1893). "Anthropological notes on the aboriginal tribes of the Daly River, North Australia" (PDF). Transactions of the Royal Society of South Australia. 17. Adelaide: 254–264.
- Stanner, W. E. H. (June 1934). "Ceremonial Economics of the Mulluk Mulluk and Madngella Tribes of the Daly River, North Australia. A Preliminary paper (continued)". Oceania. 4 (4): 458–471. doi:10.1002/j.1834-4461.1934.tb00122.x. JSTOR 27976164.
- Tindale, Norman Barnett (1974). "Pongaponga (NT)". Aboriginal Tribes of Australia: Their Terrain, Environmental Controls, Distribution, Limits, and Proper Names. Australian National University. ISBN 978-0-708-10741-6.
