= Yunggor =

The Yunggor were an Aboriginal Australian people of the Northern Territory.

== Language ==
The Yunggor spoke a dialect of Matngele, one of the Daly languages. The language has died out, and was recorded in the 1960s only from two aborigines who remembered it as a second language.

== Country ==
According to Norman Tindale, the Yunggor were one of several small tribes, with an estimated 100 square miles (260 km^{2}) of land covering the swampland west of Hermit Hill, and south of the Daly River.

== People ==
The Yunggor may have been a clan of the Ngolokwangga, a view which seems to be implied, according to Tindale, by the work of Herbert Basedow. Tindale adds however that W. W. H. Stanner, who did intense fieldwork in area some decades later, was of the opinion that the Yunggor were a fully-fledged tribe.

== Mythology ==
The Yunggor shared the traditional stories of creation, recited on ceremonial occasions, which were common to that area, in which the Wawalag (Wauwaluk) sisters figured prominently and were closely linked to the Gunabibi legendary mother figure. The Wawalag sisters have a key function in three distinct rituals: (a) the djunggawon ceremony, where dancers perform the swallowing of the two by a python; (b) the kunapipi story, which is reenacted to relate the swallowing of young men, and (c) the ngurlmag rite which concerns details about the Wawalag sisters' shelter.

== Alternative names ==
- Junggor

== Sources ==
- Basedow, Herbert (1907). "Anthropological notes on the Western Coastal tribes of the Northern Territory of South Australia". Transactions of the Royal Society of South Australia. 31. Adelaide: 1–62.
- Berndt, R. M. (1974). Australian Aboriginal Religion. Vol. 3. Brill. ISBN 9004037276.
- Meletinsky, Eleazar M. (2014). The Poetics of Myth. Routledge. ISBN 978-1-135-59913-3.
- Stanner, W. E. H. (December 1933). "Ceremonial Economics of the Mulluk Mulluk and Madngella Tribes of the Daly River, North Australia. A Preliminary Paper". Oceania. 4 (2): 156–175. doi:10.1002/j.1834-4461.1933.tb00098.x. JSTOR 40327457.
- Stanner, W. E. H. (June 1934). "Ceremonial Economics of the Mulluk Mulluk and Madngella Tribes of the Daly River, North Australia. A Preliminary paper (continued)". Oceania. 4 (4): 458–471. doi:10.1002/j.1834-4461.1934.tb00122.x. JSTOR 27976164.
- Tindale, Norman Barnett (1974). "Junggor (NT)". Aboriginal Tribes of Australia: Their Terrain, Environmental Controls, Distribution, Limits, and Proper Names. Australian National University.
- Tryon, Darrell T. (1974). Daly family languages. Pacific Linguistics.
