= Tipperary Station =

Pastoral lease in the Northern Territory, Australia

Coordinates: 13°44′01″S 131°02′49″E

Location in Northern Territory

Tipperary Station is a pastoral lease that operates as a cattle station. It is located about 36 kilometres (22 mi) east of Daly River and 55 kilometres (34 mi) south of Adelaide River, Northern Territory, Australia. Composed primarily of open grazing land, the property occupies an area of 343,701 hectares (849,304 acres). The two adjoining sister properties are Elizabeth Downs and Litchfield Stations, and all three currently operate as a single entity often referred to as the Tipperary Group.

== Description ==
Tipperary is divided into 72 paddocks with an average size of 30 square kilometres (7,413 acres) and along with neighbouring Litchfield has six permanent steel yards, one set of portable yards, 20 aluminium tanks and 15 bores. The area has a wide variety of natural watering points in the form of springs, creeks and swamps although some can dry up prior to the wet season. The property shares a boundary with Litchfield National Park and Litchfield Station to the north, Ban Ban Springs and Douglas Stations to the east, unclaimed Crown land to the south and the Malak Malak Aboriginal Land Trust to the west.

== History ==
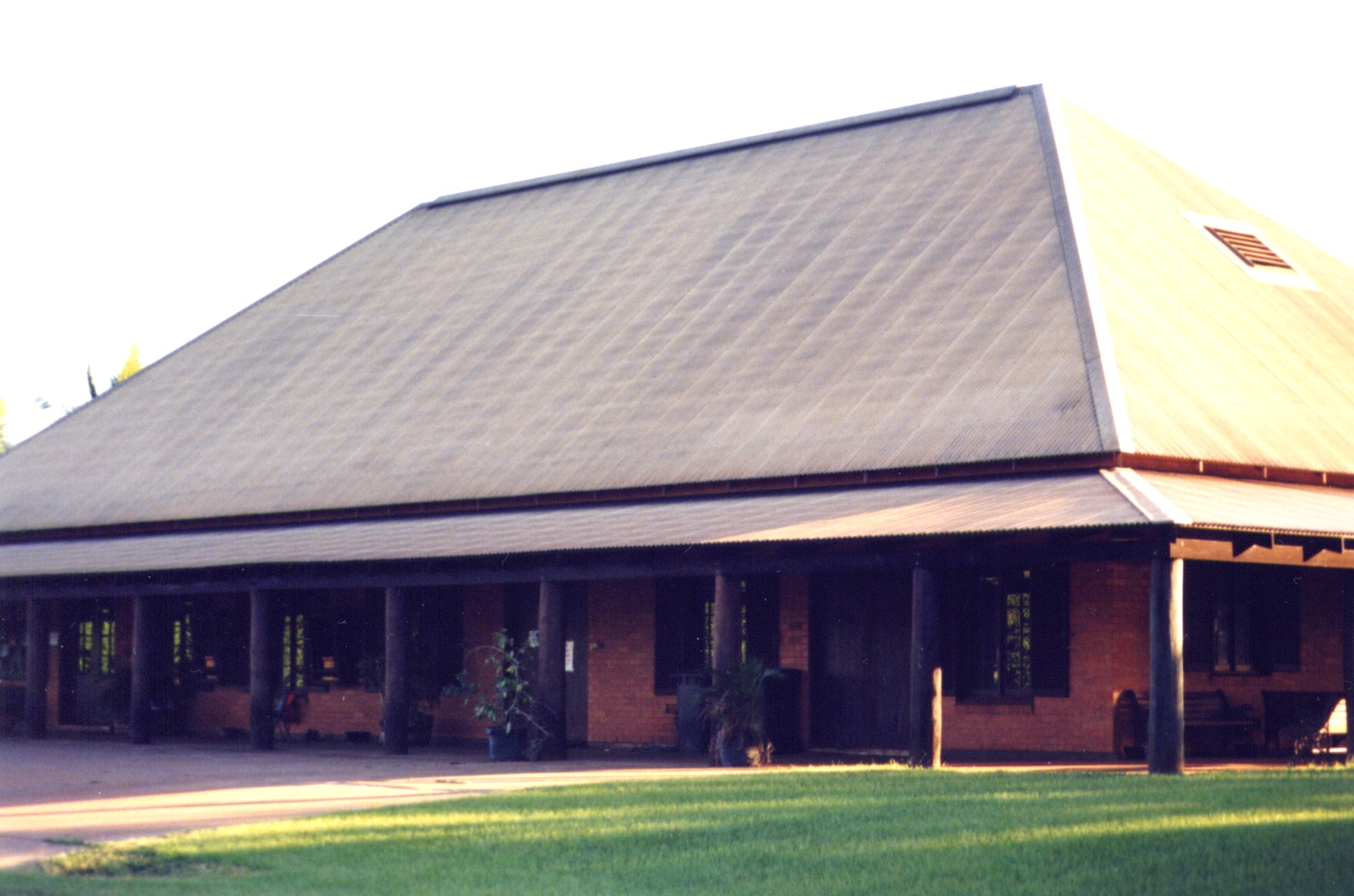
General store, Tipperary Station, Northern Territory

Established in 1914, the station was taken by William James Byrne who had previously owned a business in Brocks Creek, and eventually acquired Burnside Station. By 1914 he sold Burnside and established Tipperary just beyond the Burnside boundary. Byrne settled on the property with his wife Elizabeth and they had seven sons, only four of whom lived to adulthood.

Many cattle were killed in late 1925 along the river boundary to the station. Byrne posted a £50 reward for information leading to the conviction of the "scoundrel" responsible.

When William Byrne died in 1941, the station was left under the management of his widow and three remaining sons, who were also managing neighbouring Burnside Station.

The Byrne Brothers sold Tipperary Station in 1961 to "Tipperary Pastoral Company" a consortium of South-East Asian businessmen headed by Sir William Gunn, who expected to make the country profitable by fencing, improved pasture and watering. By June 1965 however, the company had lost over $180,000, which a year later had grown to over $300,000. It was clear that profitability would not be reached without much greater investment, beyond their ability to finance.

Gunn was acquainted with a group of Texas businessmen who had access to such capital: Robert M. Leibrock from Midland, Texas, F. H. Callaway, G. H. Landreth, R. E. Campbell, and J. G. McMillian. They had reason to be optimistic: with the promising Ord River Scheme to the west, and Katherine abattoirs to the south, and world-wide beef shortages with no end in sight, the future of the Top End looked rosy. William Neely, a lawyer from Midland, Texas, was brought into the consortium and Tipperary Land Corporation (TLC) was incorporated in Texas in January 1967, with Leibrock as president, Neely vice-president. Gunn was appointed managing director.

At takeover, the herd consisted on 25,000 head of Shorthorn cattle, and two stud herds were planned: Shorthorn for their adaptability and Brahman for foraging and tick resistance, with crossbred animals being developed more amenable to the climate. Fencing would create paddocks of 4,000 ha while bores and dams would be provided to improve watering. Lots of Townsville stylo would be grown for improved forage.

== The sorghum years ==
In July 1967 the NT News was able to report that a company of Texan investors "Tipperary Land Corporation" had purchased the property, Australia's (then) largest, and was prepared to spend $50 million over the next five years to develop in into a business producing 300,000 tonnes of grain sorghum annually as feed for beef cattle, of which a herd would be developed concurrently.

Before going ahead with development, the Corporation sought better conditions from the Territory's Legislative Council. Firstly, they were prohibited by the Northern Territory Land Ordinance from cultivated agriculture on what was a pastoral lease. Secondly, they wanted more secure tenure than the 50-year lease which expired in 2010. Both were touchy subjects at a time when popular opinion in Australia was firmly against foreign ownership of land, and even with the Legislative Council on side, their decisions were subject to veto by the Commonwealth Government. Eventually, the Corporation gained the right to extend their lease, and other restrictions, such as residential requirements, were dropped. Changes to the Act received Assent (from the Administrator) in September 1867.

The Corporation cannot be accused of "thinking small". They would employ a pair of Caterpillar D9 tractors, dragging between them an anchor chain, to clear thousands of hectares of virgin scrub when the ground was soft. Another D9 with a huge rake would collect the wood into windrows to be burned, then the land ploughed to a depth of 250 mm, with rows of crops two miles long. No thought was given to any other crop: sorghum had been proven for the area, it was well understood by Texans from their homeland, and there was a good world-wide market for the grain. The plan was to plant 4,850 ha in the first year, doubling the area ever year until 78,000 ha was under plough in the fourth year. In the fifth year 40,000 t of superphosphate and 16,000 t of urea would be required. Existing railway facilities would carry the grain to Darwin, where facilities for handling iron ore would load it into Japanese ships.

In practice, the giant machines never cleared the land as quickly as envisaged, and when they extended operations into the dry season, the trees snapped, leaving their roots in the ground. And the D9s with rakes missed much smaller stuff, which got pushed under by the great steel tracks, to frustrate the ploughs. They brought in another D9 to double the clearing effort and purchased D7s to assemble the windrows. The "Rome" ploughs from New Orleans barely scratched the surface, even when loaded down with tons or railway iron. They had better luck with "Majestic" ploughs from the South Australian Shearer company.

It was imperative for shareholders to see results. Under F. J. "Jim" Kelly's direction, the machinery was worked in two 10-hour shifts with maintenance in between, and by the end of October 7,500 ha had been "pulled", 4250 ha raked and 2,360 ha ploughed once. By January 1968 some 6,000 ha had been sown with one or other of 12 varieties of sorghum. Rather than hamper the sowing schedule, fertilizer was applied by 'plane when wind and rain permitted; much of the crop received nothing, consequently yield when harvested in May was highly variable. Around 4,850 ha had been planted of the 6,000 ha promised. It was decided to delay harvesting to May, to allow the grain to dry to the required standard of 14% moisture. Unseasonal rains came however: 72 mm in May 1968 against the previous record of 4 mm. The crop on which so much depended was ruined: only 5,000 t of the projected 16,000 t was harvested. The quality was poor and in August, while the grain lay exposed in Darwin, another 6 mm fell, mould set in and the grain was worse than useless; most was dumped. Gunn resigned in June 1968 and was replaced by an American, Arlen Edgar.

The company doubled down for the second season. Lessons had been learned and the Americans were praised for their perseverance. The 1968–69 crop was planted in December and fertilized while drilling. Storage and bulk handling facilities were installed at the Darwin wharf. The company's sowing targets were revised downwards, from 9,700 ha to 6,900 ha, but this year a new set of challenges arose: machinery breakdowns halted cultivation and sowing, and the required fertilizer rates proved impossible, and it was too late to organise aerial spreading. Insects, rats and weeds (Pennisetum pedicellatum) were a problem. The 1969 yield was lower than the previous year, and quality was poor, due to low grain weight and foreign matter. Some was exported to Japan but degraded due to contamination with iron ore from the handling equipment. Mitsui and Co. did not renew their contract. Neely and Edgar resigned, to be replaced by Deane H. Stoltz (a new shareholder) and John G. McMillian.

== Other interests ==
Tipperary Land Corporation ventured into two other promising areas in the Northern Territory: mining and fishing. They acquired exploration rights to some 12,000 km^{2} in the NT and Queensland and found valuable deposits of bauxite at Aurukun but little else. They purchased a fleet of vessels for prawn fishing in the Joseph Bonaparte Gulf and the Gulf of Carpentaria, along with processing facilities in Darwin. Trawlers Melville T, Bathurst T, and Coburg T made promising catches, so another six trawlers were purchased, along with a sizable stake in a Darwin barge company, Perkins Shipping and Mining Pty Ltd. Catches from their trawlers and independent companies were processed at the Darwin factory and marketed in the US and Japan under the "Teeco" brand. In October 1971, at a time of serious cash flow problems, TLC sold these assets to a Panamanian company for a small loss.

== Return to cattle ==
The company, now named Tipperary Land and Exploration Corporation, abandoned its grandiose schemes, to concentrate on fundamentals. Despite arrival of the sorghum midge Contarinia sorghicola, yields of 3,360 kg/ha was achieved in some areas. Dry season irrigation by massive sprays from concrete channels fed from the Daly River proved troublesome, and was largely abandoned. Meanwhile, development of a Territory breed of cattle continued. Selected Brahman cows and semen from Charolais and Chianina bulls produced calves of great promise, and cross-breeding gave good results.

In 1972 the company began showing good results and in November 1973 sold Tipperary Station for $4.5 million to the Suttons Motors group of companies, based in Sydney.

== Later ==
Part of Tipperary was surrendered to the Crown in 1986 along with portions of Stapleton and Camp Creek pastoral leases to form Litchfield National Park.

The station was once owned by entrepreneur Warren Anderson, who bought the property in the mid-1980s. Anderson built a zoo stocked with 1800–2200 animals including a pygmy hippopotamus and a rhinoceros. Other facilities included an indoor equestrian centre, an 8,000 feet (2,438 m) bitumen runway suitable for a Boeing 727 to land, and resort accommodation. He had intended to stock the group with 200,000 head of cattle but struck financial problems and sold the property in 2003.

The group was then acquired by Melbourne-based barrister Allan Myers for $50 million along with the 80,000 cattle. Myers also acquired Elizabeth Downs, Fish River and Litchfield Stations.

The Australian Agricultural Company (AACo) offered A$105 million to acquire Tipperary and Litchfield stations along with the 60,000 head of cattle in 2009, but its shareholders voted against the acquisition at an extraordinary general meeting held three months later.

In 2011, the Australian Agricultural Company (AAco) purchased the Tipperary group's cattle herd of 53,000 head for A$26 million, and also entered a one-year agreement to use the station group for agistment purposes with options to extend.

In 2012, David Warriner, the head of the Northern Territory Cattlemen's Association, was managing the group, which was stocked with 70,000 cattle raised for live export to Indonesia. In September 2014 AAco elected not to exercise their option to continue with the agistment agreement and decided to de-stock and exit the station by June 2015. In March 2015, ex Australian Agricultural Company chief operating officer David Connolly was appointed general manager of the Tipperary Group and took over responsibility for the overall management of the group and the AAco drawdown and exit.

== In popular culture ==
The 2024 Netflix drama series Territory was filmed at the station under the name "Desert King", and the station was assigned the fictional name "Marianne Station". During filming many of the employees of the station were used for cattle mustering and station work scenes as well as extras in the production, some with speaking roles. Authenticity of station life was therefore valued and maintained. During production, around 140 of the 180 NT staff lived at the station.

== See also ==
- List of ranches and stations
