= List of storms named Mitchell =

The name Mitchell has been used for two tropical cyclones in the Australian region:

- Cyclone Mitchell (2012) – a Category 1 tropical cyclone that did not affect land.
- Cyclone Mitchell (2026) – a Category 3 severe tropical cyclone that affected Northern Territory and Western Australia.

== See also ==
- Hurricane Mitch (1998) – a similar name that has been used in the Atlantic Ocean.
