= Awinmul =

Aboriginal Australian people

The Awinmul are an Aboriginal Australian people of the Northern Territory.

== Country ==
The Awinmul's traditional lands covered an estimated 1,800 square miles (4,700 km^{2}) of land from Brocks Creek to the Edith River and the headwaters of the Mary and Fergusson Rivers. The Uwinymil people's country is now in Kakadu National Park, and the people are part of a group to whom native title was granted in March 2022.

== History ==
A long and intense drought struck their region in the early 20th century, resulting in a drastic reduction of the Awinmul. The remnant of survivors were subsequently absorbed by the Wulwulam.

== Alternative names ==
- Awinnmull
- Awinmil

== Sources ==
- Tindale, Norman Barnett (1974). "Awinmul (NT)". Aboriginal Tribes of Australia: Their Terrain, Environmental Controls, Distribution, Limits, and Proper Names. Australian National University. ISBN 978-0-708-10741-6. Archived from the original on 20 March 2020.
