= Giyug language =

Extinct Australian aboriginal language

Giyug
- Kiyuk
- (unattested)
- Native to: Australia
- Region: Daly River; Anson Bay, Peron Islands, southwest of Darwin.
- Extinct: by 1920s 2 (1981)
- Language family: unclassified (Wagaydyic?)

Language codes
- ISO 639-3: giy
- Glottolog: giyu1238
- AIATSIS: N226
- ELP: Giyug

Giyug is an extinct and unattested Australian Aboriginal language. It may (or may not) have been close to Wagaydy—perhaps a dialect—but is otherwise unknown. According to Ian Green, it went extinct before the 1920s.
