= Maramanindji =

Indigenous Australian tribe of the Northern territory

The Marimanindji were an indigenous Australian tribe of the Northern Territory. Little is known of them.

== Name ==
The anthropologist W.E.H. Stanner thought that other attested tribal names, Maritjamiri and Mangikurungu, properly belonged to the Marinmanindji. Norman Tindale noted a similarity between their name and that of the Nanggikorongo also identified in this area, but did not draw any conclusion, since adequate material to clarify the overlap was not available.

== Language ==
Marimanindji was a dialect within the Marrithiyel language cluster. No fluent speakers remained of it by 2016.

== Country ==
Marimanindji ranged to the south of Hermit Hill, in the central Daly River area. Later work indicated that they lived south of both the Daly and Darwin rivers, to the west, and near the headwaters of the Muldiva river. The Marranunggu and Marrithiyal lay to their west, the Ngan'gimerri to their south and the Kamu and Moil to the east.

== People ==
They are generally grouped as one of the Marrithiyal. Stanner's fieldwork in 1933 suggested to him that their kinship system was of the Kariera type.

== Alternative names ==
- Maramanandji
- Maramarandji
- Marimanindu
- Marramaninjsji
- Marramaninyshi
- Murinmanindji

== Sources ==
- Simons, Gary F.; Fennig, Charles D., eds. (2017). "Marimanindji". Ethnologue: Languages of the World (4th ed.). Dallas: Summer Institute of Linguistics.
- Stanner, W. E. H. (June 1933). "The Daly River Tribes: a Report of Field Work in North Australia". Oceania. 3 (4): 377–405. JSTOR 40327429.
- Tindale, Norman Barnett (1974). "Marimanindji (NT)". Aboriginal Tribes of Australia: Their Terrain, Environmental Controls, Distribution, Limits, and Proper Names. Australian National University Press. ISBN 978-0-708-10741-6.
- Trounson, Andrew (19 October 2016). "Preserving precious Indigenous languages". Pursuit.
- Wurm, Stephen (2007). "Australasia and the Pacific". In Moseley, Christopher (ed.). Encyclopedia of the world’s endangered languages. Routledge. pp. 425–577. ISBN 978-0-7007-1197-0.
