= Daly languages =

Regional group of Australian language families

Daly
- (geographic)
- Geographic distribution: Daly River region, northern Australia
- Linguistic classification: Geographic group of Australian language families.
- Subdivisions: Malak-Malak; Wagaydyic; Eastern Daly †; Western Daly; Southern Daly

Language codes
- Glottolog: None
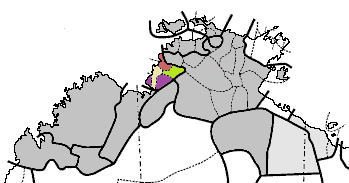
- The Daly languages (color), among the other non-Pama-Nyungan languages (grey)

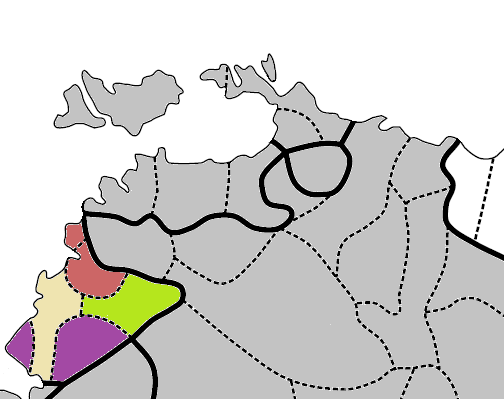
Closeup. Anson Bay is the northernmost section, Murrinh-patha the westernmost.
North Daly West Daly	East Daly South Daly

The Daly languages are an areal group of four to five language families of Indigenous Australian languages. They are spoken within the vicinity of the Daly River in the Northern Territory.

== Classification ==
In the lexicostatistic classification of O'Grady, Voegelin and Voegelin, the Daly languages were put in four distinct families. Darrell Tryon combined these into a single family, with the exception of Murrinh-patha. However, such methodologies are less effective with languages with a long history of word borrowing.

Linguist Ian Green found that the languages could not be shown to be related by the comparative method, and so should be considered five independent families and language isolates. The features they do share also tend to be shared with neighboring languages outside the Daly group.

The established families (according to Nordlinger) are:

- Daly
  - Wagaydyic (Anson Bay)
    - Batjamalh (Wadjiginy)
    - Pungu Pungu (Kandjerramalh)
  - Malak-Malak (Nguluk Wanggar)
  - Western Daly
    - Marri Ngarr
    - Merranunggu
    - Marrithiyel
    - Marramaninjsji
  - Eastern Daly
    - Matngele (Werret/Dakayu)
    - Kamu
  - Southern Daly
    - Murrinh-patha
    - Ngan’gityemerri

Malak-Malak and Wagaydyic were once considered grouped into a Northern Daly family. Contemporary classifications may use Northern Daly to refer to Malak-Malak to the exclusion of the Wagaydyic languages (as Nordlinger does).

== Vocabulary ==
Capell (1940) lists the following basic vocabulary items for three Daly languages:

gloss	Mulluk Mulluk (Northern Daly)	Marithiel (Western Daly)	Nanggumiri (Southern Daly)
man	jinja	mäɽi	meːbur
woman	aluwaɽa	mogo	walmi
head	bundu	biji	däbi
eye	numuru	miɽi	damɔi
nose	jinin	jɛn	dedji
mouth	aɽe	ŋaɭ	dedir
tongue	njändilg	ŋaɭ ḏiri-ḏiri	daːŋ
stomach	mɛn	maři	dɛːgɛː
bone	muɽid	amuwa	ami
blood	dawud	wogirin	budjän
kangaroo	djɛjud	awɛdjiwuruŋ	djawugu
possum	wiju	abujiri	abundarmi
emu		amuɽdjiːr	
crow	waŋgir	awag	awaŋgi
fly	ŋudjun	awamir	ami
sun	miɽi	bandi	miːri
moon	jɛl	biŋgal	diwin
fire	djiäŋ	djändji	jäŋgi
smoke	wɛn	djämu	jäŋgi dawan
water	waːg	wodi	guɽu
