= Mulluk-Mulluk =

Indigenous Australian ethnic group

The Mulluk-Mulluk, otherwise known as the Malak-Malak, are an indigenous Australian people of the Northern Territory, Australia.

== Language ==
Mulluk-Mulluk is classified as an independent member of the northern Daly languages, and is considered a language isolate. By 2002 it was estimated to have less than 10 speakers.

== Ecology ==
The Mulluk-Mulluk lived traditionally on the northern side of the Daly River.

== Social system ==
Stanner studied two particular institutions: the merbok system of intertribal exchange and the kue, a ceremonial gift exchange which had both a legal and religious function in the local system of marriage.

Exchange among aboriginal groups was widely thought to be a mere matter of elementary barter. Stanner argued, instead, that it could involve quite complex systems, and he likened the merbok system he uncovered to the Kula system of exchange described by Bronisław Malinowski among the Trobriand Islands and later found to be widespread in areas of Papua New Guinea, such as Milne Bay Province.

In essence merbok, the word denoting both the act and the object exchanged, required 3 individuals, within a tribe or with one from an outside group, in which a material article (ninymer), never food, was given to one person, retained by them for a time, and then passed onto the third. The objects exchanged seem to have followed a particular direction, with a trade circuit from north to south involving the Warrai, Kungarakany, Djerait, Wogait, Pongaponga, Mulluk Mulluk, Madngella, Yunggor, Maranunggo, Marithiel, Marimanindji, Nangiomeri, Wagaman, Nangimeri, Kamu, Moiil, Nangor, Nordaniman, Kadjerawang and Jaminjang.

== History ==
By the time W. E. H. Stanner managed to interview them, the Mulluk-Mulluk tribe had lost contact with many of its traditions, after suffering the brunt of half a century of contact and dispossession from the incursion of white settlement. They were almost decimated in the wake of the killing of 4 settlers in 1884 by members of the Wulwulam tribe, as the Darwinian hinterlands were explored and occupied by traders, miners and settlers, from Macassan trepangers scouring the coasts for beche-de-mer, and Chinese hardscrabble farmers to European pastoralists, causing dispersal, deracination and decimation of numerous distinct tribes, the remnants of which tended to gather about stations or missions for hand-outs. A Jesuit mission established on the Daly in the Mulluk-Mullak heartland in 1886 noticed the influx from all quarters, and on closing three years later, relocated to Hermit Hill, 20 miles inland, westwards.

== Notes and references ==
=== References ===
- Ganter, Regina (2015). "German Missionaries in Australia: Daly River (1886-1899)". Griffith University.
- McGregor, William B. (2002). Verb Classification in Australian Languages. Walter de Gruyter. ISBN 978-3-110-87087-9.
- Rose, Deborah Bird (2000). "Tropical Hundreds:monoculturalism and colonisation". In Docker, John; Fischer, Gerhard (eds.). Race, Colour and Identity in Australia and New Zealand. University of New South Wales Press. pp. 59–78. ISBN 978-0-868-40538-4.
- Stanner, W. E. H. (December 1933). "Ceremonial Economics of the Mulluk Mulluk and Madngella Tribes of the Daly River, North Australia. A Preliminary Paper". Oceania. 4 (2): 156–175. doi:10.1002/j.1834-4461.1933.tb00098.x. JSTOR 40327457.
- Stanner, W. E. H. (June 1934). "Ceremonial Economics of the Mulluk Mulluk and Madngella Tribes of the Daly River, North Australia. A Preliminary paper (continued)". Oceania. 4 (4): 458–471. doi:10.1002/j.1834-4461.1934.tb00122.x. JSTOR 27976164.
