= Fish River (Northern Territory) =

Coordinates: 13°58′02″S 130°53′03″E

Fish

Location
- Country: Australia
- State: Northern Territory
- Region: Katherine Region

Physical characteristics
- Mouth: confluence with the Daly River
- Basin size: 1,748 km^{2} (675 sq mi)

The Fish River is a river in the Northern Territory of Australia. It is a tributary of the Daly River which ultimately flows into the Joseph Bonaparte Gulf which is part of the Timor Sea.

Its catchment covers an area of 1,748.15 km^{2}. None of the land within the river's watershed, which is covered by woodlands and melaleuca forest, has been cleared of its vegetation.

== See also ==
- List of rivers of Australia § Northern Territory
