= Kandjerramalh language =

Australian Aboriginal language of the Northern Territory

Kandjerramalh
- Pungupungu
- Kuwema
- Native to: Northern Territory Australia
- Region: Daly River
- Extinct: (date missing)
- Language family: Wagaydyic: Kandjerramalh

Language codes
- ISO 639-3: None (mis)
- Glottolog: pung1239
- AIATSIS: N11

Kandjerramalh (Kenderramalh), also known as Pungupungu or Kuwema (Kuwama), is an Australian Aboriginal language from the Northern Territory in Australia. Apart from being closely related to Wadjiginy, it is not known to be related to any other language.

The alternative names are ambiguous. "Kuwema" is also a name of the Tyaraity dialect of Malak-Malak, and "Pungupungu" is now used as a name of Malak-Malak proper.
