= Eastern Daly languages =

Australian Aboriginal language family

Eastern Daly
- Geographic distribution: Daly River region, northern Australia
- Linguistic classification: Macro-Gunwinyguan ?: Eastern Daly
- Subdivisions: Matngele †; Kamu †

Language codes
- Glottolog: east2374
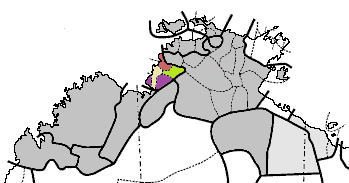
- The Daly languages (color), among the other non-Pama-Nyungan languages (grey)

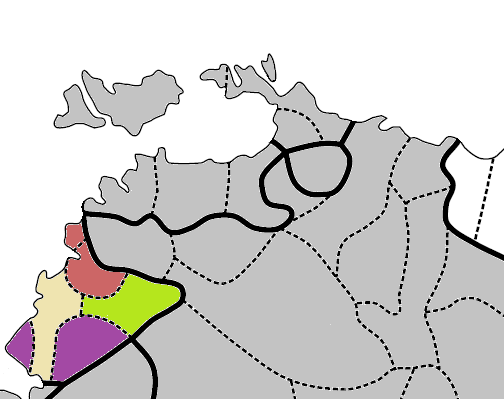
- Eastern Daly

The Eastern Daly languages are an extinct family of Australian aboriginal languages that are fairly closely related, at 50% cognate. They were:

- Eastern Daly
  - Matngele
  - Kamu

These languages had elements of verbal structure that suggest they may be related to the Macro-Gunwinyguan languages. All are now extinct.

== Vocabulary ==
The following basic vocabulary items are from Tryon (1968).

no.	gloss	Kamor	Matngala
1	head	puǰæ	puǰa
2	hair	puǰæmaR	pučæmænæŋ
3	eyes	miyam	dun
4	nose	činin	činin
5	ear	piyawuR	peyawuR
6	tooth	ŋat	ŋat
7	tongue	ŋaltïretïre	ŋænæR
8	shoulder	tæwæR	tæwæR
9	elbow	dændar	dandar
10	hand	mæmæk	mæmæk
11	breasts	kuyuŋ	mœRmœR
12	back	dætœm	dætœm
13	belly	mæn	pak
14	navel	čœdur	čœdœR
15	heart	mændulma	mændulma
16	urine	wure	wœre
17	excrete	kœn	kœn
18	thigh	čære	čære
19	leg	kærær	kaR
20	knee	pœŋgaR	pœŋgar
21	foot	mær	mær
22	skin	baR	karala
23	fat	mœdl	mœdl
24	blood	čœrŋuɲ	čœruŋœɲ
25	bone	pæč	pæč
26	man	čiǰe	čije
27	woman	pamgun	kuwarak
28	father	baŋɔ	baŋgač
29	mother	kilaɲŋɔ	kidlaŋ
30	grandmother	kalaɲŋɔ	kawoy
31	policeman	čayač	čaǰiɲ
32	spear	kanbe	kanbe
33	woomera	lagač	lagaɲ
34	boomerang	čïmbičïmbič	čïmbičïmbič
35	nullanulla	magulbɔ	yimnalanala
36	hair-belt	maR	muŋuR
37	canoe	wænæ	wænæ
38	axe	mæŋ	mæŋ
39	dilly bag	kalan	kaRaR
40	fire	yim	yim
41	smoke	wæn	wuŋgɔR
42	water	wuk	wuk
43	cloud	wœŋ	pær
44	rainbow	pululɔy	pulɔypulɔy
45	barramundi	kœyl	kœly
46	sea	wuk kučuwoy	kærætïl
47	river	wukpædæR	pædæR
48	stone	pawar	pawaR
49	ground	yurɔ	yurɔ
50	track	čal	mær
51	dust	puruŋ	puruŋ
52	sun	mœRœR	mœrœr
53	moon	nœdœn	nudun
54	star	naŋɔ	milan
55	night	ŋoykdiɲ	ŋœyč
56	tomorrow	pukunuŋ	neganuŋ
57	today	neyœnuŋ	kamɔ
58	big	æluŋɔ	kunuwaraŋ
59	possum	bɔ	bɔ
60	dog	čamar	čamaR
61	tail	čirin	čiriɲ
62	meat	piɲæk	piɲa
63	snake	piɲam	ŋuɲbœr
64	red kangaroo	čayïR	čayɛR
65	porcupine	mïdlk	mænɛŋɛč
66	emu	nœwœt	nœwœt
67	crow	waŋgaR	waŋgaR
68	goanna	araɲ	aRaɲ
69	blue tongue lizard	pïRir	pïRïR
70	mosquito	wuræŋ	wœraŋ
71	sugar-bag	wamæR	wæmæR
72	camp	dak	dak
73	black	wakpara	wakwaRa
74	white	puŋma	tamaRma
75	red	pirpma	piRpma
76	one	næmbayɔ	næmbeyɔ
77	two	palpmurɔ	kurinǰeyɔ
78	when?	anaɲmiye	aneɲïmbediɲ
79	what?	anǰanuŋ	anǰa
80	who?	nuwun	nuŋuɲ
81	I	ŋurɔnuŋ	ŋurɔ
82	you	nuŋgɔrnuŋ	waŋare
83	he	kuna	kuna
84	grass	wæn	wæn
85	vegetable food	mæye	miye
86	tree	yim	yim
87	leaf	wurœr	dæmbæl
88	pandanus	čaŋača	čaŋača
89	ironwood	pawič	pawit
90	ripe	damgane	pirpma
91	good	kunburiɲ	kunburič
92	bad	kuwaruk	kuwarɔ
93	blind	wuɲ	wuɲ
94	deaf	ɲaba	ɲaba
95	saliva	tak	tak

== See also ==
- Daly languages
