= Malak-Malak language =

Endangered Aboriginal language of Australia's Northern Territory

Malak-Malak
- Mullukmulluk
- Nguluk Wanggarr
- Region: Northern Territory
- Ethnicity: Mulluk-Mulluk, Ngolokwangga, Djerait
- Native speakers: 10 Malak-Malak (2016 census); 5 Tyeraity (2005)
- Language family: Language isolate
- Dialects: Malak-Malak; Djerait (Kuwema)
- Writing system: Latin

Language codes
- ISO 639-3: Either: mpb – Malak-Malak woa – Kuwema (Tyaraity)
- Glottolog: nort1547
- AIATSIS: N22 Malak Malak, N10 Kuwema (Tyaraity)
- ELP: Malak Malak
- Kuwema
- Malak Malak is classified as Severely Endangered by the UNESCO Atlas of the World's Languages in Danger.

Malak-Malak (also spelt Mullukmulluk, Malagmalag), also known as Ngolak-Wonga (Nguluwongga), is an Australian Aboriginal language spoken by the Mulluk-Mulluk people. Malak-Malak is nearly extinct, with children growing up speaking Kriol or English instead. The language is spoken in the Daly River area around Woolianna and Nauiyu. The Kuwema or Tyaraity (Tyeraty) variety is distinct.

== Classification ==
Malak-Malak was formerly classified as an independent member of the Northern Daly languages, but is now considered a language isolate, along with the "Anson Bay" group of Wagaydy (Patjtjamalh, Wadjiginy, Kandjerramalh) and the unattested Giyug. Green concluded that Wagaydy and Malak-Malak were two separate language families. Some later classifications have linked them such as Bowern (2011). However, the Wagaydy people are recent arrivals in the area, and their language may only be similar due to borrowing. AIATSIS and Glottolog both treat Wagaydy as an isolate and Giyug as unclassifiable.

In contemporary usage, "Northern Daly" (e.g. Harvey 2003, Cahir 2006, Nordlinger 2017) most often refers specifically to the group of languages which includes Malak-Malak and Tyerraty (also known as Guwema), a variety with which Malak-Malak differs significantly in vocabulary (65% according to Tryon's 200 word list), but is very close to morphologically.

== Phonology ==
=== Vowels ===
	Front	Central	Back
Close	i	ɨ	ɯ / u
Mid	ɛ	ɜ	
Open		ɐ	

=== Consonants ===
		Peripheral		Laminal	Apical	
		Bilabial	Velar	Palatal	Alveolar	Retroflex
Nasal		m	ŋ	ɲ	n	
Stop	voiceless	p	k	c	t	
Stop	voiced	b	g		d	
Rhotic					ɾ	ɻ
Lateral				ʎ	l	
Semivowel		w		j		

Plosives /p t c k/ may be heard as voiced as [b d ɟ ɡ] when intervocalic.

== Typological classification ==
Malak-Malak, is an ergative–absolutive language with constituent order mainly determined by information structure and prosody, but syntactically free. Marking of core-cases is optional. The language is mostly dependent-marking (1), but also has no marking (2) and head-marking features (3).

Doro-ngayi muyiny
name-3SG.F dog
"Doro's dog"

meldaty ada tjung yintjerrik
trip 1SG.EXCL.go.PST stick small.M
"I tripped on the little stick"

ngatj yunu tjinang pak-ma nende wag puyunduk-nana
EMPH 3SG.M.sit.PST stay.give sit-CONT thing/person water underneath-LOC
"he sits down underneath the water"

== Morphosyntactic properties ==
Malak-Malak's verb phrase uses complex predicates. These consist of an inflecting verb that has properties of person, number and tense. Malak-Malak only has six such verbs. In example (4), yuyu and vida are inflecting verbs. Additionally, there are coverbs which have aspectual properties, but do not inflect for number, tense or person. They occur with inflecting verbs. They are unlimited in number and new verbs are also borrowed into this class. In (4), kubuk-karrarr, dat-tyed, and ka are coverbs. They can also form serial verbs (kubuk-karrarr, dat-tyed).

kubuk-karrarr dat-tjed yuyu yanak ka yida=ke
swim-move.up look-stand 3SG.M.stand.PST one come 3SG.M.go.PST=FOC
"he crossed the river and looked once, then he came here"

== Spatial Language ==
Malak-Malak employs all three "classic" types of spatial Frames of Reference: intrinsic, relative and absolute. Additionally, the language uses place names and body-part orientation to talk about space. The intrinsic Frame requires some kind of portioning of the ground object or landmark into named facets from which search domains can be projected. In English this would be, for example, the tree is in front of the man. And in Malak-Malak it would be (5).

tjung angundu-na muyu
tree behind-LOC 3SG.N*.stand.PST
"the tree was behind (the man)"

The relative Frame of Reference involves mapping from the observer's own axes (front, back, left, right) onto the ground object. An English example is the ball is on the right. In Malak-Malak it would be (6)

yerra tjalmiyiny dek kantjuk purrat-ma wuta
now right place up/upwards jump-CONT 3SG.N.go.PST
"now the ball was on the right, jumping up (lit. jumping in an upward place on the right)"

The absolute Frame of Reference requires xed bearings that are instantly available to all members of the community. An English example is the opera is west of here. In Malak-Malak, three different types of absolute frames can be used. Those based on the course of the sun (east/west) (7a), on prevailing winds (northwesterly/southeasterly) (7b), and on two sides of the prominent Daly River (northeastern/southwestern bank) (7c).

miri tjalk-ma yina, yina miri paiga-ma
sun go.down-CONT this this sun go.up-CONT
"this one is west and this one is east"

Waliwali-nen pudang tjedali yuyu nul-yen pudang tjedali yuyu
Daly.River-DIR face.towards stand.PART 3SG.M.stand.PRS northwesterly-DIR face.towards stand.part 3SG.M.stand.PRS
"one is facing the river and the other one is facing northwest"

duk puyunduk kinangga yide chair=we
place underneath north.eastern.bank/this.side 3SG.M.go/be.PRS chair=FOC
"it is underneath, on the northeastern bank's side, of the chair"

== Vocabulary ==
=== Tryon (1968) ===
The following basic vocabulary items of Northern Daly language varieties, including Malak-Malak (or Mullukmulluk), are from Tryon (1968).

no.	gloss	Mullukmulluk	Djeraity
1	head	pundɔ	pundu
2	hair	pundɔmæk	pundumæR
3	eyes	numɔrɔ	numɔrɔ
4	nose	yinïn	yinun
5	ear	čawœr	muninǰawœr
6	tooth	dit	diR
7	tongue	ŋændɛl	ŋændulk
8	shoulder	mœndœl	mændœm
9	elbow	pimïle	pimilu
10	hand	naɲïl	naɲulk
11	breasts	wiyœ	wiŋ
12	back	payak	daɲ
13	belly	pœɲ	pœɲ
14	navel	čœčœt	čœčuruk
15	heart	mændulma	mændulma
16	urine	wurɔ	wurɔ
17	excrete	wœn	wœn
18	thigh	čæt	čæR
19	leg	wilit	dulk
20	knee	pœŋgœl	pœŋgœl
21	foot	maǰan	mæl
22	skin	ŋæčïdl	karala
23	fat	milyœ	laɲ
24	blood	dawut	padawɔ
25	bone	nœrœt	murɔ
26	man	yiɲa	lœlambœr
27	woman	alawaR	alœrguR
28	father	baŋa	papaŋa
29	mother	wiyaŋa	kalaŋa
30	grandmother	æǰæŋa	ŋeyæčɔ
31	policeman	čæyæčman	čayačdiɲ
32	spear	čaŋar	čaŋal
33	woomera	yarawa	maduR
34	boomerang	čïmbičïmbič	čïmbičïmbič
35	nullanulla	warawara	čændæɲ
36	hair-belt	pudur	purur
37	canoe	wænde	wændɔ
38	axe	walyïmba	ličpuRp
39	dilly bag	karɛr	pæmbuR
40	fire	čœŋ	čuŋɔ
41	smoke	wæn	wæn
42	water	wak	wak
43	cloud	durɔ	pæRk
44	rainbow	dæpulɔlɔy	pulɔlɔy
45	barramundi	wɔ	wɔ
46	sea	ŋambač	ŋambač
47	river	wakwurɔ	wurɔ
48	stone	wadlk	wulɔ
49	ground	pawuRk	wœnǰœ
50	track	yære	æRɔ
51	dust	pulɔ	pulɔ
52	sun	mïre	mirɔ
53	moon	yædlk	yœlk
54	star	nœmœrœl	numurudl
55	night	puwaR	poyædɔ
56	tomorrow	nœyænœ	nuŋɔyɔ
57	today	æmæn	æɲika
58	big	wunædle	wudælɔ
59	possum	wœyœ	wœyœ
60	dog	moyiɲ	moweyiɲ
61	tail	wœmœ	wumɔ
62	meat	dæ	dæ
63	snake	ŋunǰul	čalala
64	red kangaroo	čæyœt	manduRk
65	porcupine	mænɛŋɛč	manɛŋɛč
66	emu	čïnburat	ŋœrœɲ
67	crow	waŋgïr	waŋguR
68	goanna	čæriɲ	čæɲ
69	blue tongue lizard	kumugut	pɛrɛt
70	mosquito	wænŋɛn	wænŋun
71	sugar-bag	piǰak	ŋœčœn
72	camp	dæk	dæk
73	black	eyïkeyïk	eyukeyuk
74	white	puŋma	tamalma
75	red	widma	witma
76	one	yanakŋa	yawunuka
77	two	wæræna	wærunuka
78	when?	amanæle	ŋædekælædiɲ
79	what?	nïgidæ	nïgidæ
80	who?	eyɛn	aŋon
81	I	ŋa	ŋa
82	you	waŋare	niɲ
83	he	yœndœn	yœndœn
84	grass	wæne	wænœ
85	vegetable food	mi	miyɔ
86	tree	čœŋ	čuŋɔ
87	leaf	dæmbæl	wœR
88	pandanus	murɔmurɔ	narɔ
89	ironwood	pawit	æluRk
90	ripe	moeŋœɲ	damberæmæ
91	good	yunbayan	munbayɛn
92	bad	yinat	munætɔ
93	blind	wuɲak	wuɲ
94	deaf	ɲabɔ	ŋamama
95	saliva	čalïlk	čalulk

=== Blake (1981) ===
Below is a basic vocabulary list from Blake (1981).

English	Malak-Malak
man	yinya
woman	alawar
mother	wiyanga
father	panga
head	puntu
eye	numuru
nose	yinin
ear	tyewör
mouth	ari
tongue	ngentilk
tooth	tit
hand	nenyilk
breast	wiyi
stomach	pöny
urine	wuru
faeces	wön
thigh	tyat
foot	matyan
bone	mörröt
blood	tawut
dog	muyiny
snake	te nguntyul
kangaroo	tyeyöt
possum	wöyö
mosquito	wenngin
emu	tyinpurrat
eaglehawk	waruk
crow	wangkirr
sun	mirri
moon	yelk
star	nömöröl
stone	walk
water	wak
camp	tek
fire	työng
smoke	wen
food	mi
meat	te
stand	wurrma
sit	pak
see	tat
go	pi
get	tap
hit	taty
I	nga
you	wangarri
one	yanaknga
two	werrena
