= Matngala language =

Extinct language of northern Australia

Matngele
- Region: Northern Territory, Australia
- Ethnicity: Madngella, Yunggor
- Extinct: by 2006 perhaps 1 reported 1973; perhaps 10 reported 1990
- Language family: Eastern Daly: Matngele
- Writing system: Latin

Language codes
- ISO 639-3: zml
- Glottolog: madn1237
- AIATSIS: N12
- ELP: Matngele
- Madngele is classified as Critically Endangered by the UNESCO Atlas of the World's Languages in Danger.

Matngele or Madngele is an extinct Australian Aboriginal language of the Northern Territory spoken by the Madngella and Yunggor peoples.

== Classification ==
Tryon (1974) classified Matngele with Kamu, and this is accepted by Dixon (2002) and Bowern (2011), though denied by Harvey (1990).

== Phonology ==
=== Vowels ===
	Front	Central	Back
High	i		u
Mid	e	ɵ	
Low			a

=== Consonants ===
		Peripheral		Laminal	Apical	
		Bilabial	Velar	Palatal	Alveolar	Retroflex
Stop	Voiceless	p	k	c	t	
Stop	Voiced	b	ɡ	ɟ	d	
Nasal		m	ŋ	ɲ	n	
Lateral				ʎ	l	
Rhotic					r	ɻ
Semivowel		w		j		

== Grammar ==
Matngele has only five simple verbs. These must be combined with coverbs in order to form complex verbs.
