= Nauiyu Nambiyu Community =

Nauiyu Nambiyu Northern Territory
- Coordinates: 13.75°S 130.69°E
- Population: 304 (2016 census)
- Postcode(s): 0822
- LGA(s): Victoria Daly Region
- Territory electorate(s): Daly
- Federal division(s): Lingiari

Nauiyu Nambiyu is an Aboriginal community in the Katherine Region of the Northern Territory, Australia.

The settlement was originally founded in the 1950s as a Roman Catholic mission on Mulluk-Mulluk aboriginal land. It is located on the banks of the large perennial Daly River, near the town of Daly River, Northern Territory, and located 230 km from Darwin, the capital of the Northern Territory.
