= Kamu language =

Extinct language of northern Australia

Kamu
- Gamor
- Native to: Australia
- Region: Northern Territory
- Extinct: 1980s
- Language family: Eastern Daly: Kamu

Language codes
- ISO 639-3: xmu
- Glottolog: kamu1258
- AIATSIS: N33
- ELP: Kamu

The Kamu language, or Gamor, was an indigenous Australian language spoken in Northern Territory, Australia. There were two speakers in 1975.
