= Knut Dahl =

Norwegian zoologist and explorer

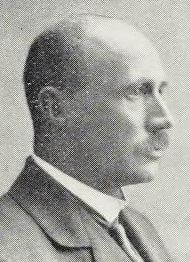
Knut Dahl

Knut Dahl (28 October 1871 – 11 June 1951) was a Norwegian zoologist and explorer who made important bird collections in northern Australia.

== Early years ==
Dahl grew up at Hakadal in Akershus, Norway, where his father was an estate manager. Surrounded by forests, lakes and rivers, Dahl became an excellent shot and a skilled angler. In 1889 he entered the University of Oslo where he studied zoology. In 1893, at the age of 21, he was given the opportunity to conduct a scientific expedition to South Africa and Australia to collect animal specimens for the University's Zoological Museum. In South Africa he occupied himself with some big game hunting as well as the collection of scientific specimens.

== Travels in Australia ==
In March 1894 he left Port Natal (Durban), accompanied by his taxidermist Ingel Olsen Holm, and journeyed to Australia where he moved from Adelaide to Sydney and then to Darwin in Australia's Northern Territory.

From Darwin Dahl and Holm went to the Uniya Mission Station on the Daly River where they stayed for several months, making long trips by dinghy on the river and collecting specimens. They later travelled to the Victoria and Alligator Rivers where they collected two new pigeons and a parrot. The new birds were the chestnut-quilled rock-pigeon, the Arnhem Land subspecies of the banded fruit-dove, and the hooded parrot, all described by R. Collett in 1898 in the Proceedings of the Zoological Society of London.

After a visit to Batavia and Singapore Dahl and Holm returned to Western Australia where they collected in the vicinity of Roebuck Bay. They finally departed Australia in March 1896, arriving back in Norway on 4 May.

== Later life ==
In 1898, he was appointed as a research fellow at the Royal Norwegian Society of Sciences and Letters (Det Kongelige Norske Videnskabers Selskap) in Trondheim. On Dahl's return to Norway he wrote books about his experiences in South Africa and Australia; his account of the latter was first published in Norwegian in 1898, then titled In Savage Australia when it was eventually translated and published in English in 1926. He became an eminent scientific authority on fish, especially salmonids, and was stationed for many years at Trondheim and Bergen.
