= Daly River (Northern Territory) =

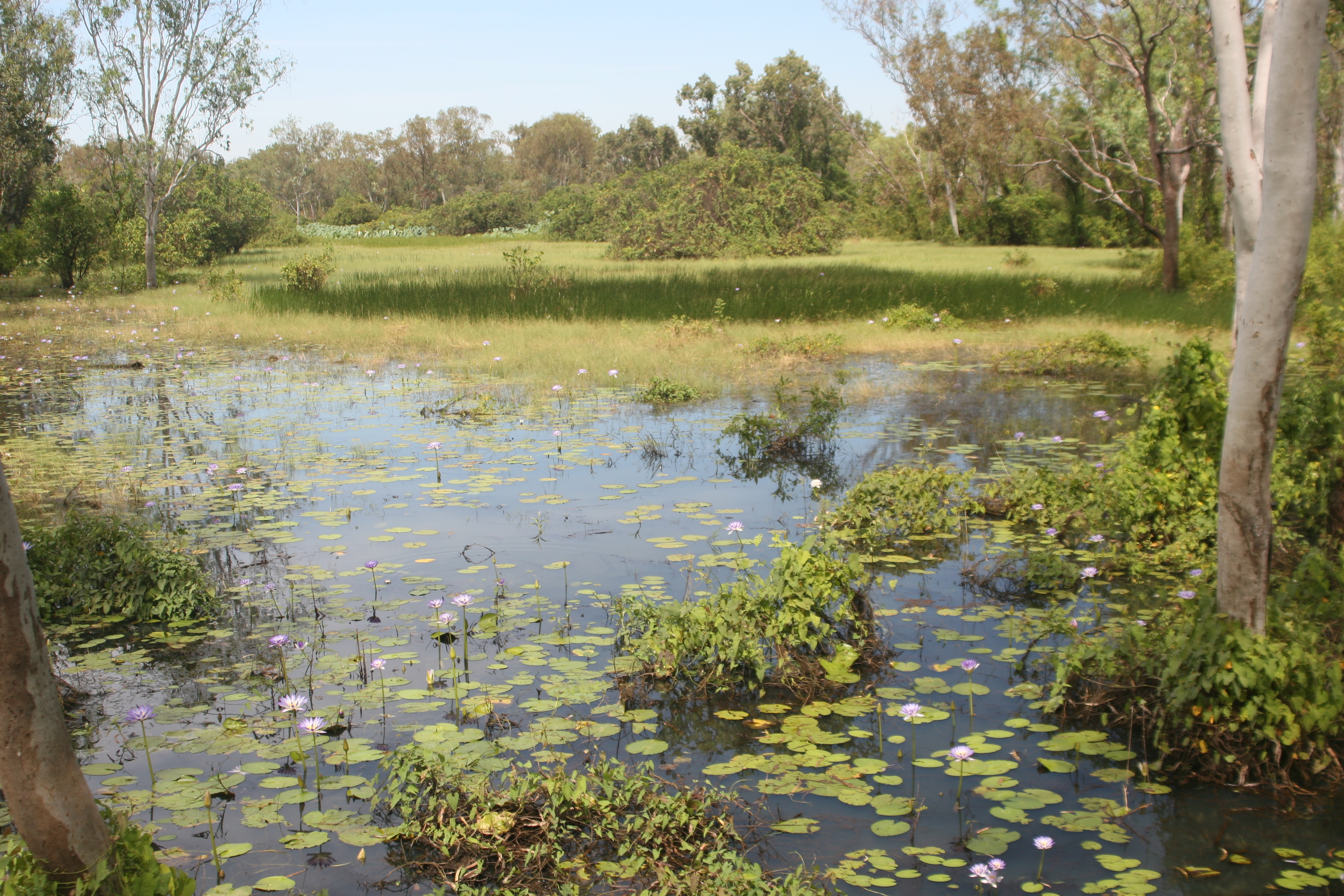

- Location within Northern Territory
- Etymology: Dominick Daly

Location
- Country: Australia
- Territory: Northern Territory

Physical characteristics
- Source
  - location: Confluence of Flora and Katherine river
  - coordinates: 14°39′22.9536″S 131°42′18.0864″E
  - elevation: 64 m (210 ft)
- 2nd source: Katherine River
  - location: Arnhem Land
  - coordinates: 13°16′2.9784″S 133°4′27.7608″E
  - elevation: 453 m (1,486 ft)
- 3rd source: Flora River
  - location: Flora River Nature Park
  - coordinates: 14°54′37.6884″S 131°10′35.0328″E
  - elevation: 268 m (879 ft)
- Mouth: Timor Sea
  - coordinates: 13°20′S 130°19′E
  - elevation: 0 m (0 ft)
- Length: 354 km (220 mi)
- Basin size: 53,708 km^{2} (20,737 mi^{2})
- Discharge
  - location: Near mouth
  - average: 369.7 m^{3}/s (11,670 GL/a)
- Discharge
  - location: Wooliana (92 rkm, 13°40′43.428″S 130°38′36.6648″E; Basin size: 49,898.4 km^{2} (19,265.9 sq mi)
  - average: 317.8 m^{3}/s (10,030 GL/a)
- Discharge
  - location: Mount Nancar (113 rkm, 13°47′58.8624″S 130°43′30.2448″E; Basin size: 47,652 km^{2} (18,399 sq mi)
  - average: (Period: 2000–2022)315.3 m^{3}/s (9,950 GL/a)
  - minimum: 11 m^{3}/s (350 GL/a) (1970)
  - maximum: 8,293 m^{3}/s (261,700 GL/a) (1998)
- Discharge
  - location: Dorisvale Crossing (214 rkm, 14°21′47.8764″S 131°33′23.9004″E; Basin size: 33,227 km^{2} (12,829 sq mi)
  - average: (Period: 2000–2022)215.1 m^{3}/s (6,790 GL/a)

Basin features
- River system: Daly River
- Tributaries
  - left: Flora, Bradshaw Creek, Jinduckin Creek, Cattle Creek, Bamboo Creek, Fish, Chilling Creek, Hermit Creek
  - right: Katherine, Fergusson, Stray Creek, Douglas, Green Ant Creek, Hayward Creek, Kilfoyle Creek, Elliot Creek

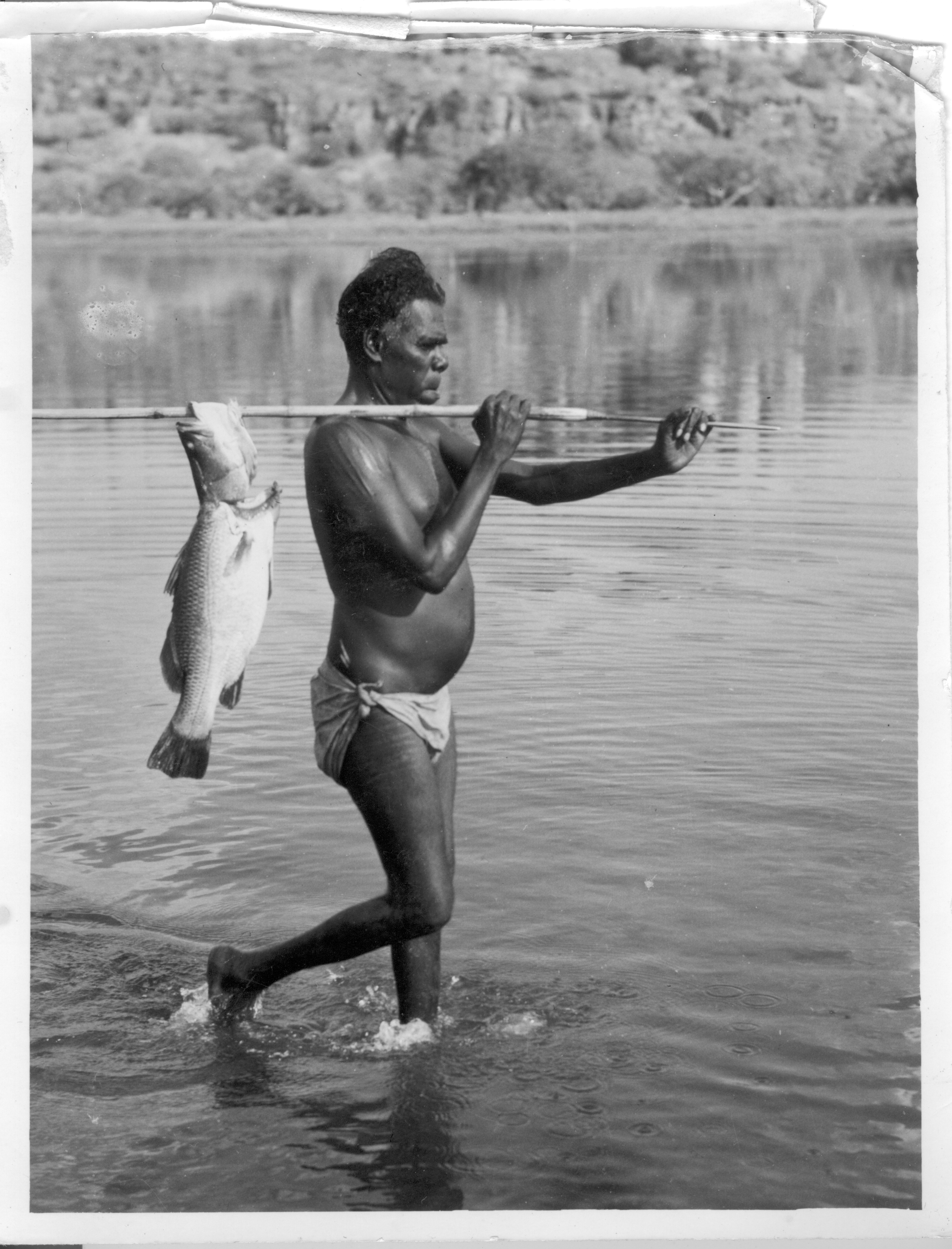
Man fishing in the Daly River, c1950s

The Daly River is a river in the Northern Territory of Australia. It is part of the Daly Catchment.

The Daly River flows 354 kilometres (220 mi) from the confluence of the Flora River and Katherine River to its mouth on the Timor Sea. It is one the few major rivers in the Northern Territory that flows all year round. Sustained by groundwater, its dry-season flows are five time larger than any other river in the territory.

It is home to more than 90 species of fish. It is best known for its large barramundi making it a popular waterway for recreational fishing. The floodwater carries baitfish which attracts predatory barramundi. The river is also home to the critically endangered largetooth sawfish. It also has eight different turtle species, includes the endangered pig-nosed turtle, more than any other Australian river.

== History ==
The traditional owners of the river and surrounding area are the Wadjigiynk, Maranunngu, Malak Malak, Kamu, Warai, Nanggiwumerri, Wagiman, Wardaman, Dagoman, Jawoyn, Matngala, and Yangman peoples.

Boyle Travers Finniss named the river after Sir Dominick Daly, the Governor of South Australia, as the Northern Territory was at that time part of South Australia. The region then lay untouched by Europeans until 1882 when copper was discovered.

Settlement on the river is centred on the Aboriginal community of Nauiyu, originally the site of a Catholic mission from 1955 to 1977, as well as the town of Daly River itself, at the river crossing a few kilometres to the south.

=== Industry ===
The Daly River Copper Mine was established after a rich copper lode was discovered at Mt Haywood along the Daly River in 1882. Woolwonga people killed four mine workers Johannes Noltenius, John Landers, Thomas Schollert and Henry Roberts on 3 September 1884. This triggered the Coppermine massacres led by the mine manager Sachse with a police party, led by George Montagu, that saw over 150 people killed, decimating the Malak-Malak and Woolwonga people. After a history of boom to bust and multiple lease turnovers the mine closed for good in 1925.

The river also supports cattle, with the Daly River Cattle Station starting up in 1985, now Tipperary Station.

The Daly River is popular location for tourism and recreational fishing due to its large barramundi. It hosts two major fishing competitions annually, the "Barra Classic" and the "Barra Nationals". Both occur just after the wet season when the flooded river is falling fast, and clear water is pouring in off the floodplains which is thought to be the best time for fishing.

The Daly is also the site of a proposed large-scale cotton industry harvesting up to 500 gigalitres of flood waters. This would come under the Oolloo Dolostone Aquifer Water Allocation Plan that has already been overallocated by the Northern Territory Government.

=== Floods ===
Like other rivers of the top end, the Daly is prone to seasonal flooding. Major flood events devastated the town of Daly River in 1899 and 1957, causing widespread property damage. The largest flood event post colonisation was in 1998, when floodwaters were fed by heavy rainfall in the wake of Tropical Cyclone Les reaching a peak of 16.25 m (53.3 ft) at the Daly River Police Station gauge, the highest level recorded to date. There were also flooding events triggering evacuations in 2000, 2018, 2023 and 2024.

== Discharge ==
Mean annual discharge of the Daly River at Mount Nancar (period from 1971 to 2021) and Dorisvale Crossing (period from 1966 to 2021):

Year	Mean annual discharge		Mean annual discharge	
Year	Mount Nancar		Dorisvale Crossing	
Year	(GL/yr)	(m^{3}/s)	(GL/yr)	(m^{3}/s)
1966			3,953.86	125.4
1967			4,183.33	132.7
1968			7,990.78	253.4
1969			6,112.79	193.8
1970			929.54	29.5
1971	3,055.7	96.9	3,073.52	97.5
1972	5,687.83	180.4	3,632.47	115.2
1973	7,839.22	248.6	3,887.4	123.3
1974	20,253.44	642.2	12,401.14	393.2
1975	7,484.03	237.3	4,286.37	135.9
1976	17,002.91	539.2	12,267.05	389
1977	6,421.06	203.6	8,090.05	256.5
1978	4,132.81	131.1	4,190.23	132.9
1979	4,177.21	132.5	3,322.47	105.4
1980	8,560.55	271.5	5,620.36	178.2
1981	7,574.83	240.2	5,143.17	163.1
1982	4,301.86	136.4	3,422.13	108.5
1983	2,311.66	73.3	1,590.18	50.4
1984	10,906.22	345.8	8,151.43	258.5
1985	4,565.57	144.8	2,117.47	67.2
1986	1,339.5	42.5	1,051.33	33.3
1987	6,114.56	193.9	5,165.54	163.8
1988	1,516.71	48.1	1,181.76	37.5
1989	5,696.05	180.6	2,710.78	86
1990	1,054.51	33.4	694.37	22
1991	9,506.28	301.4	6,508.84	206.4
1992	2,003.16	63.5	1,371.8	43.5
1993	7,062.55	224	4,457.08	141.3
1994	6,562.66	208.1	5,077.1	161
1995	8,354.25	264.9	4,596.53	145.8
1996	2,199.76	69.8	1,517.22	48.1
1997	15,952.31	505.8	10,723.82	339.4
1998	13,449.46	426.5	10,096.29	320.2
1999	10,307.06	326.8	7,188.43	227.9
2000	14,335.51	454.6	9,454.27	299.8
2001	14,418.61	457.2	10,884.56	345.2
2002	7,672.74	243.3	4,918.2	156
2003	6,827.31	216.5	6,738.52	213.7
2004	20,593.86	653	16,682.53	529
2005	3,987.72	126.5	2,995.99	95
2006	12,806.45	406.1	9,772.37	309.9
2007	6,547.18	207.6	5,001.04	158.6
2008	14,953.96	474.2	9,298.98	294.9
2009	13,365.59	423.8	10,078.81	319.6
2010	6,212.97	197	4,630.84	146.8
2011	23,694.11	751.3	14,168.17	449.3
2012	9,189.34	291.4	5,610.28	177.9
2013	5,863.01	185.9	3,739.89	118.6
2014	9,246.1	293.2	5,027.72	159.4
2015	3,739.96	118.6	2,714.27	86.1
2016	9,234.43	292.8	5,722.1	181.5
2017	10,920.68	346.3	6,580.47	208.7
2018	11,352.47	360	5,925.41	187.9
2019	1,843.01	58.4	1,126.49	35.7
2020	2,260.75	71.7	1,002.67	31.8
2021	9,704.87	307.7	7,152.42	226.8
2022	3,923.92	124.3	2,731.36	86.6
2023	9,302.05	294.8	5,546.09	175.7

== Tributaries ==
- Katherine River
- Fish River
- King River

=== List of major tributaries ===
The largest tributaries of the Daly River:

Left tributary	Right tributary	Length (km)	Basin size (km^{2})	Average discharge (m^{3}/s)
Daly		354^{*}	53,708	369.7
Hermit C.		62.4	2,456.3	30.2
	Elliot C.	24.2		2.9
	Kilfoyle C.	15.9	455.4	6.5
Chilling C.		69.9	1,241	12.4
	Hayward Creek	29.6	472	5.8
Austral C.		16		1
Survey C.		15.6	200.2	1.7
Fish		89.1	1,748	20.5
Bamboo C.		10.6	627.4	6.1
	Green Ant Creek	48.8	914	15
	Douglas	83.4	1,964	21.8
Cattle C.		17.5	122.5	1.2
Jinduckin Creek		35.2	348.3	2.7
	Stray C.	64	1,216	8.2
Brandshaw Creek		63.5	1,181	6.5
	Dead Horse C.	41.4		1.4
	Fergusson	144	4,833.6	30.6
	Yuwaiyunn Creek			1.3
	Yujullowan Creek	29.1	191.4	0.7
	Mullers C.	8.7		0.06
Flora		139	6,876	27.2
	Katherine	328	24,363.3	109.8

^{*}Daly River 354 km (220 mi) with Flora River (139 km (86 mi) is 493 km (306 mi) long; Daly River with the Katherine (328 km (204 mi) is 682 km (424 mi) long;

== See also ==
- List of rivers of Australia § Northern Territory
- Daly languages
