= Wandi Wandi =

Indigenous Australian resistance leader and outlaw

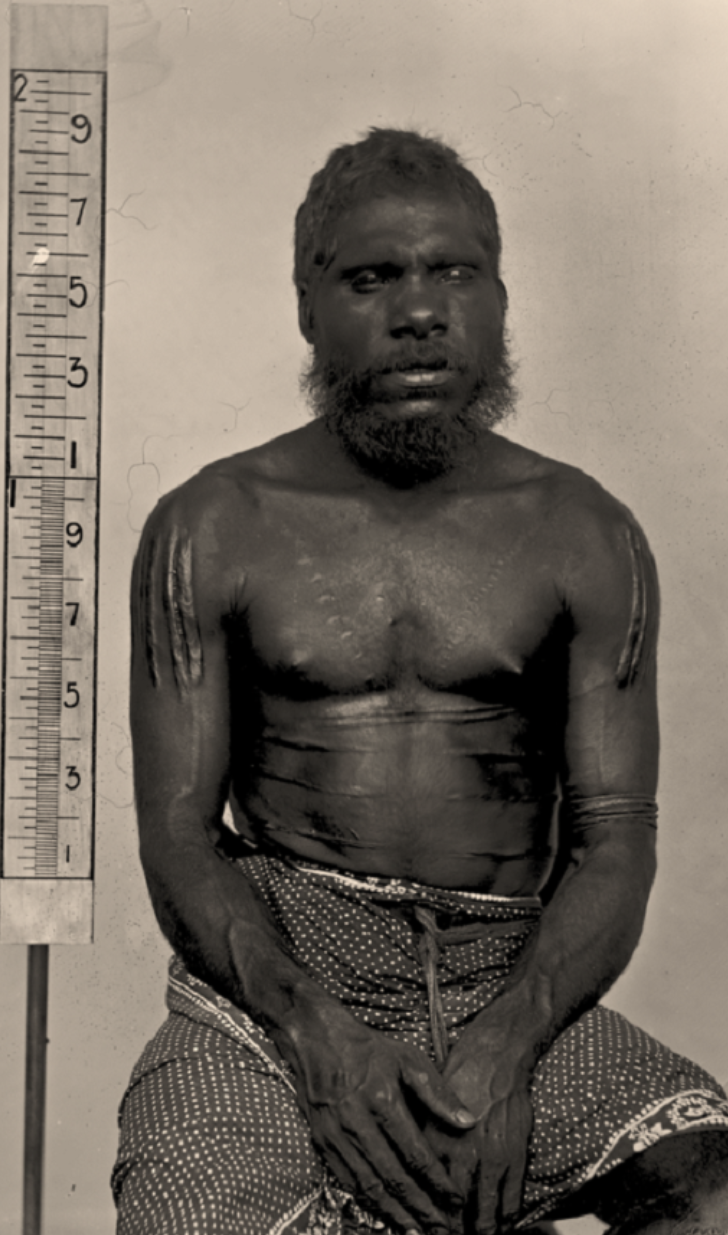
Photograph of Wandi Wandi taken by Paul Foelsche c.1880

Wandi Wandi (c.1850 – 25 July 1893), also known as Wandy Wandy, was an Indigenous Australian resistance leader and outlaw of the Iwaidja group of people from the Northern Territory of Australia.

He led a successful mutiny of kidnapped pearl divers against blackbirders in the Torres Strait, and later killed a British colonist on Croker Island in revenge for the shooting death of one of his kinsmen.

Wandi Wandi also led a gang who, in 1892, killed six Macassan fisherman in what has been termed the Malay Bay massacre.

He was hanged in 1893, becoming the second person to be legally executed in the Northern Territory.

While in jail, Wandi Wandi produced a number of drawings which became significant examples of colonial period Indigenous Australian art.

== Early life ==
Not much is known of Wandi Wandi's origin except that he was member of the Iwaidja people whose home country was around the Mountnorris Bay area of the Cobourg Peninsula. He was also known to frequent nearby Port Essington and Croker Island. He was probably born around 1850.

== Blackbirded to the Torres Strait ==
In October 1877, Wandi Wandi was one of around twenty young Iwaidja men and women who were deceived by Captain Francis Cadell to board his ship at Mountnorris Bay on the pretext of obtaining employment by gathering trepang for him in the local waters. Instead, Cadell blackbirded Wandi Wandi and his companions, forcibly taking them hundreds of kilometres away to the Torres Strait where they worked as his pearl diving slaves.

Cadell, who had been a pioneer of the paddle steamer industry on the Murray River during the 1850s, had a history of blackbirding in Western Australia and in the Dutch East Indies and had been under investigation. He assigned Wandi Wandi and the rest of the captured group of Iwaidja to his pearling boat named Flying Scud located near Badu Island. This boat was under the command of Cadell's associate, James Price.

== Mutiny and return to homeland ==
By July 1878, the Iwaidja men and women had been enslaved as pearl divers on the Flying Scud at Badu for more than six months. Having enough of this treatment, Wandi Wandi decided to lead an uprising and take control of the ship. At an opportune time, he killed Price with a tomahawk, while the other Iwaidja overpowered and killed the three other members of Price's crew. Wandi Wandi and the others then dumped the corpses on Badu Island and sailed the Flying Scud the thousand or so kilometres back to their homeland on the Cobourg Peninsula.

Around two weeks later, Wandi Wandi's actions inspired another mutiny of blackbirded Iwaidja pearl divers working for Captain Cadell in the Torres Strait on the pearling vessel Gem. Around ten Iwaidja, led by Yanmarry, attacked the chief mate of the Gem with an axe and large knives. They injured him and forced him overboard. The Iwaidja then ransacked the Gem and loaded themselves and their loot onto one of its longboats and sailed off. It is unclear if this group made it back to the Cobourg Peninsula.

== Revenge killing of Thomas Wingfield ==
After successfully returning to the Cobourg Peninsula in the Flying Scud, Wandi Wandi was regarded as a hero by his people. It seems the British authorities did not have the will or the ability to investigate the mutiny and Wandi Wandi and his companions were able to return to their normal semi-traditional lives. Wandi Wandi had learnt to speak English fluently and could also communicate to a degree in Macassan. He and other Iwaidja were able to obtain casual employment with the Macassan trepang fishermen when they sailed to the Cobourg Peninsula each year to collect sea cucumber and turtle shell for the Chinese market.

British colonists, Edward Robinson and Thomas Wingfield, also established a trepang fishing station on Croker Island and employed Wandi Wandi and several other Iwaidja men to work for them. In December 1879, Wingfield had an argument an Iwaidja employee named Malganah which resulted in Wingfield shooting Malganah dead. Wandi Wandi was sent for and he arrived on the evening of the same day. He found Wingfield asleep in his hut and immediately killed him with a tomahawk. Wandi Wandi and his kinsmen then ransacked the hut and cleared out.

The police were soon alerted to the killing and Inspector Paul Foelsche was tasked with capturing Wandi Wandi. Foelsche was on good terms with most of the Iwaidja and he was able to convince a respected elder named Mildirn to get Wandi Wandi to give himself up. Eventually, months later in 1880, Wandi Wandi approached Robinson's encampment at Port Essington, where he was handcuffed and taken to Port Darwin as a prisoner.

At Port Darwin, the magistrate was unable to judge on cases of murder, so to avoid having to send Wandi Wandi to Adelaide where he was likely to be exonerated, he was charged with lesser crime of manslaughter. Wandi Wandi's trial proceeded in May 1881 with him being assigned a lawyer who argued that Wandi Wandi had simply acted according to the customs of tribal law. However, the jury found him guilty and magistrate Edward William Price sentenced Wandi Wandi to 10 years jail with hard labour.

== Incarceration and recognition as an artist ==
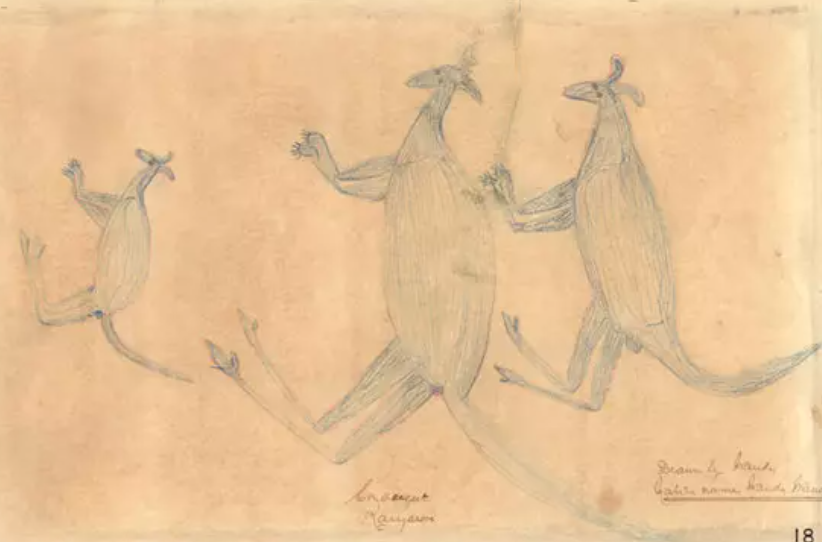
Drawing of kangaroos created by Wandi Wandi while in jail

Wandi Wandi served his sentence at Fannie Bay Gaol where he was regarded as an intelligent yet quiet prisoner. Along with other Indigenous inmates like Billiamook, Wandi Wandi was encouraged by the prison superintendent, John George Knight, to produce traditional Aboriginal drawings with supplied European art utensils. Wandi Wandi created a number of drawings for Knight which became part of an important collection of colonial Aboriginal Australian art.

== Rapid Creek mission and return to country ==
Wandi Wandi was released from prison in 1889 and was immediately sent to the Jesuit Aboriginal mission at Rapid Creek. He was highly regarded by Father Donald MacKillop, but left only after a few weeks to return to his home country on the Cobourg Peninsula.

By this time, violent and ruthless buffalo shooters such as Joe Cooper had become established in Iwaidja country, and soon after arriving back in his homeland, Wandi Wandi was accused of planning to kill Cooper. Wandi Wandi was therefore viewed as a danger to colonial interests in the region, with a local newspaper calling for "a well-directed bullet" to "steady him".

== Malay Bay massacre ==
In May 1892, Wandi Wandi and several of his Iwaidja kinsmen happened to be at Cape Brodgen (also known as Mandool) where they came across a wrecked proa that belonged to six Aru Islander fishermen. The Aru Islanders were armed with guns, revolvers, knives and bows and arrows. According to Wandi Wandi, the Aru Islanders shot at them and threatened to cut their hands off. The Iwaidja were subsequently assigned to act as porters for the Islanders and to guide them to the customs station located around 80 kilometres to the west.

The Iwaidja men carried the Islanders' boxes and started to guide them. At a lagoon near Malay Bay, they decided upon a plan to disarm the fishermen and kill them. Wandi Wandi acted first with dexterity and strength by taking the knife and revolver from the captain of the Islanders, as well as disarming him of his bow and arrows. A man named Capoondur then hit the captain on the head with a wooden club, killing him instantly. Minaedge, Angareeda, Marakite and Goolargno then killed the other Aru Islanders with clubs and a tomahawk. Arrambion and Mangarippy then made sure they were dead by spearing and clubbing the bodies.

After killing the fishermen in what has become known as the Malay Bay massacre, Wandi Wandi's group buried the corpses, and then returned to the proa where they set fire to it. They took the Islanders boxes and firearms and distributed amongst their people.

It wasn't until October 1892 when the British administration in Port Darwin started to hear of the massacre. Police Inspector Paul Foelsche and customs official Alfred Searcy were soon sent to the region with a number of troopers to capture Wandi Wandi and his gang. At Malay Bay, Wandi Wandi and seven other men were taken prisoner. The bodies of the Aru Islanders were dug up by the police and their battered skulls removed as evidence. Mangarippy was forced to carry the skulls around his neck in a bag created from modified trousers.

== Trial for murder ==
The trial of Wandi Wandi and his seven alleged accomplices occurred on 14 February 1893. Wandi Wandi, who could speak fluent English, attempted to take full responsibility for the crime and asked to have the more serious charges dropped against his kinsmen. The judge, Charles Dashwood, disagreed and after a brief proceeding where no evidence was presented for the defence, the jury found all eight defendants guilty of murder. Wandi Wandi made a statement that the Aru Islanders had threatened violence against them first but this was ignored by the court. Dashwood then pronounced the death sentence on all eight of the Indigenous men. On the following two days, Dashwood also sentenced another two Aboriginal men, Charlie Flannigan and Warrima to death in trials for unrelated crimes.

Opposition to the idea of executing ten Aboriginal prisoners in quick succession became apparent in Adelaide, where the government had responsibility for the Northern Territory. In regards those sentenced for the Malay Bay massacre, the death sentence was subsequently commuted for all except Wandi Wandi, who ironically was the only one who didn't kill any of the Aru Islanders. However, Wandi Wandi with his strong history of retribution, was regarded as a dangerous person to colonial society and was deemed the ringleader and therefore responsible.

== Execution and death ==
It was judged that Wandi Wandi should be executed near to the place of the crime on his home country in front of his people. In July 1893, a ship transported Wandi Wandi, as well as several officials and a special collapsible gallows to Malay Bay. Once there, police inspector Paul Foelsche, gathered around 30 Iwaidja people and the gallows was assembled at a camp site that was frequented by both Indigenous people and the Macassans.

Wandi Wandi was hanged to death on 25 July 1893. His body was then buried at the site of the execution. He was hanged in front of his countrymen and the gallows were left standing as "a warning to the natives".

Wandi Wandi became only the second person to be legally executed in the Northern Territory. Charlie Flannigan, who was also Aboriginal and sentenced to death in the same week as Wandi Wandi, was the first.

== Legacy ==
Wandi Wandi was regarded as a hero to the Iwaidja people for his bravery and audacity in applying mortal retribution to white men. He is also regarded as an important Aboriginal artist of the colonial period.

== See also ==
- List of Indigenous Australian historical figures
