= Timeline of strikes in 1951 =

Strikes in 1951

A number of labour strikes, labour disputes, and other industrial actions occurred in 1951.

== Background ==
A labor strike is a work stoppage, caused by the mass refusal of employees to work, usually in response to employee grievances, such as low pay or poor working conditions. Strikes can also take place to demonstrate solidarity with workers in other workplaces or to pressure governments to change policies.

== Timeline ==
=== Continuing strikes from 1950 ===
- Corroboree Strikes. In Darwin, Northern Territory, Australia. Led by Fred Nadpur Waters.
- Empire Zinc strike
- 1950–51 Irish rail strike

=== February ===
- 1951 Grenada general strike
- 1951 Lānaʻi pineapple strike. 201-day strike by pineapple plantation workers in Lānaʻi, Hawaiʻi.
- 1951 New Zealand waterfront dispute

=== March ===
- Barcelona tram strike

=== April ===
- Moton School Strike
- 1951 Detroit transit strike. 59-day strike by transit workers in Detroit, United States.
- 1951 Polish miners strikes. Wave of strikes by miners, especially in the Dąbrowa Basin, Poland.

=== May ===
- 1951 Egyptian doctors' strike

=== June ===
- 1951 Khartoum police strike

=== October ===
- 1951 New York wildcat dock strike

=== November ===
- 1951–52 Dublin hotel strike. 7-month strike by hotel workers in Dublin, Ireland, for the introduction of service charges.
- 1951 Israeli seamen’s strike. Seven week strike by seamen in Israel.

=== December ===
- 1951 Mitsukoshi strike, strike by Mitsukoshi workers, the first strike by workers at a major department store in Japan.
