= Larrakia people =

Aboriginal Australian people of the Darwin area

Flag of the Larrakia people

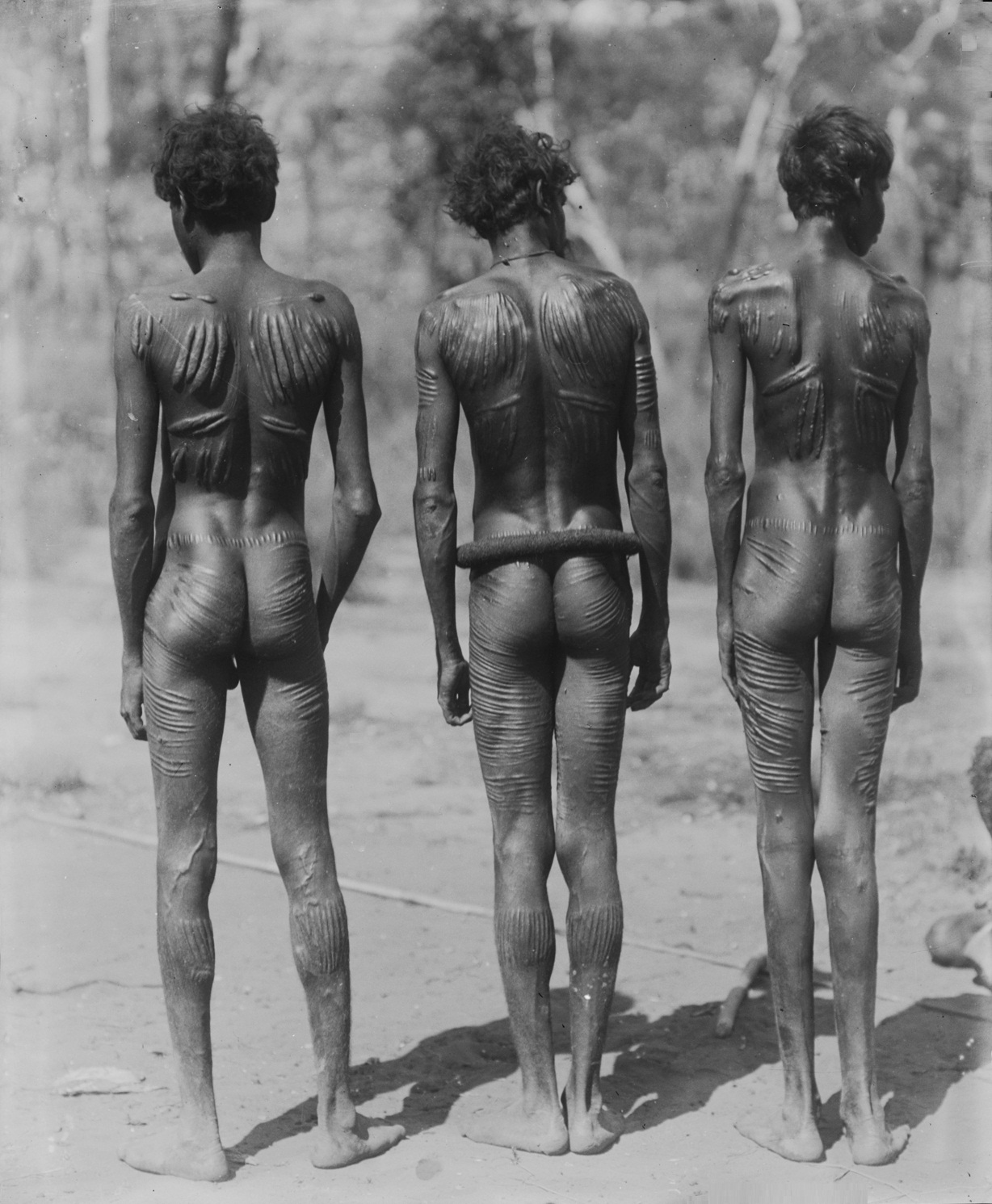
Photo of Larrakia men (note the scarification) in Port George, 1916

The Larrakia people are a group of Aboriginal Australian people in and around Darwin in the Northern Territory. The Larrakia, who refer to themselves as "Saltwater People", have a vibrant traditional society based on a close relationship with the sea and trade with neighbouring groups such as the Tiwi, Wadjiginy and Djerimanga. These groups share ceremonies and songlines, and intermarry.

== Name ==
The Larrakia were originally known as the Gulumirrgin.

== Language ==
Larrakiya/Gulumirrgin is one of the Darwin Region languages.

== Country ==
The traditional land of the Larrakia, in Norman Tindale's estimation, covers approximately 1,500 square miles (3,900 km^{2}), and took in the present day capital of Darwin, as well as Southport, Bynoe Harbour and the Howard River. It extends from the Finniss River and Fog Bay in the northeast to the vicinity of Gunn Point, west of the Adam Bay mouth of the Adelaide River. Their hinterland extension runs down south to a depth of 46 miles to a point roughly 10 miles north of Rum Jungle. This last area forms a border, with an interdiction zone of about 8–10 miles deep. (Note: At the forty-six mile on the railway line we pass their southern border, and going through a neutral belt of some eight to ten miles, strictly preserved and upon which none trespass without good reason, at near Rum Jungle enter into the territory of the Awarra.' (Parkhouse 1895, p. 1))

== Mythology ==
One Larrakia myth, according to one brief white account, (Note: Editor's note. The same myth is recounted in Foelsche (1895) with some details that indicate the informant's version mixed in details taken from what he had picked up from contact with whites. Thus he has the underground figure Nanganburra reading from a book before judging the fate of the aboriginal deceased in the otherworld. Message sticks are replaced by letters, etc. (Foelsche 1895, pp. 191–192)) spoke of a being, Mangarrara who lived in the heavens, at a place called Teeladla, and who created everything on earth save blackfellows. A further being, Nanganburra, lived deep in the bowels of the earth at a site called Abigooga. The latter created the first man, Dowed, instructing him how to procreate. In old age his people disobeyed him and in retribution he caused many to die. Old women refused to eat the geese he provided, so he fashioned the first spears and speared them in the legs, and a stranger, Charac, took them to a country called Toopoorānla. He refused to hand them and the children he had by them back when Dowed claimed them, and their descendants formed the Wulwulam people. Dowed took a young Adelaide River woman Abmadam, at Lingowa, and their offspring formed the Djerimanga. When Charac died he was transformed into a stone by a creek, touching which was fatal. When Abmadam died, she turned into a tree at Laylaloo, as did Dowed at Aleealee on the same Adelaide river. On dying the blacks descend to Nanganburra's land, and he judges whether their lives warrant their ascension to the stars, to dwell with Mangarrara. Those who fail the test are dispatched to a great fire at Omar. Still deeper down is a lake called Burcoot where Madjuitmadjuit, Mangarrara's friend, dwells. His function is to regulate the tides.

== History ==
=== Early contact with Europeans ===
The first documented contact between Larrakia and Europeans was in September 1839 when HMS Beagle under the command of John Clements Wickham and John Lort Stokes arrived in what they named Port Darwin as part of a surveying voyage around Australia. The visitors spent around two weeks at Port Darwin and the interaction with the local people was mutually friendly and inquisitive.

=== Under British colonisation ===
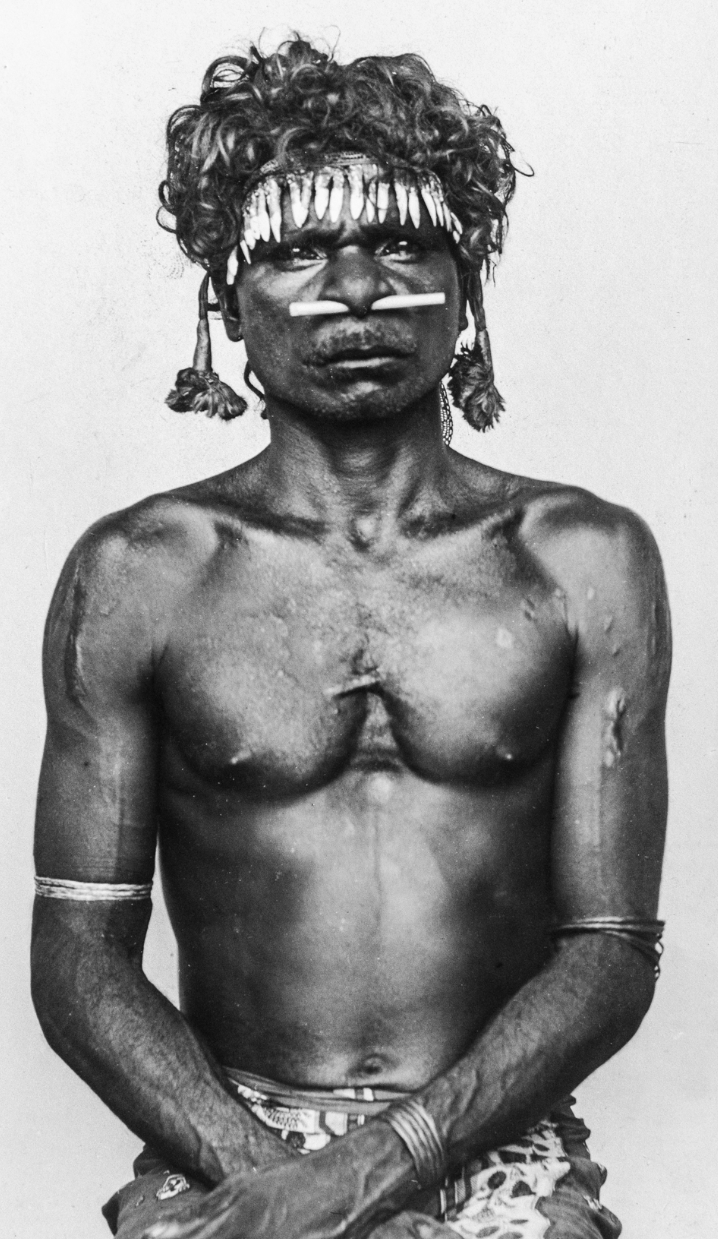
Photograph of Larrakia man, Billiamook, taken in 1886 by Paul Foelsche

In March 1869, George Goyder was sent with 120 men by the colonial authorities in South Australia to survey Port Darwin with the aim of establishing a British settlement there. The Larrakia were hospitable to Goyder's group, assisting them in building huts and storage facilities.

However, a boundary fence was soon placed around the settlement (which was called Palmerston but is now known as Darwin) to keep the Larrakia away. The Larrakia were frequently allowed in but were banished beyond the boundary if they caused problems for the colonists. On some occasions the Larrakia sided with the British to force the neighbouring Djerimanga away from Palmerston, who came to the settlement to fight both the colonists and the Larrakia.

The British used the Larrakia as unpaid labourers, giving them stale rations for working to clear land and collect firewood. When a young Larrakia man speared one of the colonist's horses in revenge for the shooting of his dog, the authorities held several of his kin hostage before sentencing him to 12 lashes with a riding whip.

Three Larrakia men, including Billiamook, were sent to Adelaide to obtain a larger knowledge of white man's society.

In 1880 it was estimated by the head of police, Inspector Paul Foelsche, that the Larrakia numbered around 500 people: 100 men, 120 women, 150 youths and 130 children. Twenty years earlier a smallpox epidemic from the east is said to have decimated so many members of the tribe that they had to leave the bodies unburied.

In 1882, a Jesuit mission to the Aborigines was established at Rapid Creek. Although some Larrakia were enticed by regular rations to attend the mission, it failed to convert a single Larrakia person to Christianity and the mission shut in 1888.

By 1892, colonial officials found that although the Larrakia people were negatively affected by disease, alcohol and prostitution, they were maintaining their population mainly through the increased number of "half-caste" children. Inspector Paul Foelsche proposed that these children should be taken to become servants of the colonists, and their mothers given a bag of flour in exchange.

With the passage of the Northern Territory Aboriginals Act 1910, the Chief Protector of Aborigines in the Northern Territory was appointed guardian of all Aboriginal and "half-caste" children until their maturity at 18. The authorities were thus empowered to keep in, or remove from, any Aboriginal reserve, any young person, regardless of their parents' or relatives' wishes.

In July 1911, on arriving to take up this position in Darwin, Herbert Basedow ordered a survey of Aboriginal conditions in and around the town. The Larrakia were found to be the majority of Indigenous people in the eight camps, occupying in particular two near the shore. The corrugated-hut shanties were tidy and the people in relative good health. The inspectors however reported that removals were in order, to relieve the township of these "eyesores". Basedow resigned after barely a month on duty.

=== Forced placement into compounds and resistance ===
Under Section 14 of the federally legislated Aboriginal Ordinance Act of 1918, all Aboriginal people in the Darwin area were required to reside in designated compounds. This was enforced from 1920.

Aboriginal people and "half-castes" in Darwin, which included Larrakia people, were forced to live firstly at the Kahlin Compound and later at the Bagot Aboriginal Reserve and Berrimah Aboriginal Compound. Their lives were placed under stringent control, they were made to work as unpaid or poorly paid labourers and conditions within the compounds were often terrible.

During World War 2, many Aboriginal men in Darwin experienced better conditions working locally for the army. After the war, these people resisted being forced back into the concentration compounds. The subsequent Corroboree Strikes of the early 1950s, led by men such as the Larrakia elder, Fred Nadpur Waters, brought national attention to the plight of Aboriginal people in Darwin.

=== Native title ===
As early as October 1972 the Larrakia had begun to assert their rights to land through the 1972 Larrakia Petition, when 1,000 Larrakia tried to present a petition 11 feet (3.4 m) long to Princess Margaret on the occasion of her visit to Darwin, arguing their land was taken by British settlers, leaving the Larrakia refugees in their own country. After the passage of the Aboriginal Land Rights (Northern Territory) Act in 1976, the Larrakia presented a formal land claim on 22 March 1979, the first move in what was subsequently described as 'the most complex and hard-fought land claim in the history of Aboriginal land rights.'

This Kenbi Land Claim pursued rights, as traditional owners, over the land, waters and islands encompassing the Cox Peninsula. The Northern Territory government fought it for some 21 years, at a cost of $20 million. In December 2000, Justice Gray's report rejected the claims of three of the claimant groups, finding only that six people belonging to the Tommy Lyons family fell within the statutory test of 'traditional Aboriginal owners'. He therefore recommended that approximately 600 km^{2} be handed back to the Larrakia people in a grant to an appropriate Aboriginal Land Trust, whose benefits would accrue to all 1,600 members of the Larrakia community.

A setback occurred in April 2006, when a Federal Court of Australia decision denied the Larrakia's native title claim on the basis of "failure to prove continuous connection with the Darwin area". In his reasoning Justice Mansfield argued that there had not been continuous observance of traditional customs and laws. Justice Mansfield's decision was later affirmed on appeal by the Full Federal Court.

In 2016, Prime Minister Malcolm Turnbull formally handed the land back to the Larrakia people.

== Larrakia organisations ==
The Larrakia Nation Aboriginal Corporation was established in 1997 to represent the traditional owners of Darwin, the Larrakia. It is also the major Aboriginal service delivery organisation for the region. As of December 2021 Larrakia Nation has a membership of over 740 people. It is active in the areas of homeless support, community services, arts and culture, research, and Indigenous rangers. It generates nearly half of its income from fee-for-service and commercial activities. Its vision is "to be a strong, self-sufficient and healthy Nation of Larrakia people, participating fully in the wider economy of Darwin and the Northern Territory, where Larrakia language, law and culture is known, respected and valued by all members of that community".

The Larrakia Development Corporation was established in 2002 by Larrakia people with the support of the Northern Land Council. The Council holds all shares in the organisation in trust for the Larrakia people. The Larrakia Development Corporation does not have a membership base; instead, its mission is enshrined in the Larrakia Development Corporation Trust deed. Its mission is "to promote the financial independence and lifestyle of all Larrakia people through the commercial development of assets and to do so in such a way that promotes employment, training and business opportunities for all Larrakia people". The Larrakia Trade Training Centre is one initiative of the Larrakia Development Corporation

In 1998 Radio Larrakia, broadcasting on 94.5 FM, was established to serve the Aboriginal community, broadcasting in over 26 Indigenous languages, providing local communities with information, interviews, community services, music and programming.

The Gwalwa Daraniki Association owns title to the area of Larrakia land which contains the Town Camps of Kulaluk and Minmarama Park.

== Alternative spellings ==
- Larrakia
- Larakiya, Larakeeyah, Larrakiya, Larrakeah, Larrakeeyah, Larrakiha
- Laragia, Larragea
- Larrakeeha, Larreekeeyah
- Larikia, Larrikia, Larrikiya
- Larriquia
- Binnimiginda (term for coastal bands)
- Gunmajerrumba (term for inland bands)
- Marri (a southern band of the Larrakia)

== Some words ==
- álgan (mother)
- angarak
- arkhngarramilla
- bánnaminngora (wild dog (dingo)) (Note: According to Foelsche, a wild dog was called meelinga. (Foelsche 1886, p. 258))
- b'illinnnga (small dog)
- dungalaba (crocodile)
- gunumijtanda (saltwater)
- langootpa (kangaroo)
- mámorol (large dog)
- nigan (father)
- peppee (father)
- wooding (mother)

== Notable Larrakia people ==
- Dolly Gurinyi Batcho, Land Rights activist
- Billiamook, interpreter for early colonists
- Jase Burgoyne, Australian rules footballer
- Raphael Clarke, Australian rules footballer
- Xavier Clarke, Australian rules footballer
- Ash Dargan, didgeridoo player
- Shadeene Evans, soccer player
- Steven May, Australian rules footballer
- Val McGinness, Aboriginal rights activist
- Daniel Motlop, Australian rules footballer
- Jesse Motlop, Australian rules footballer
- Marlon Motlop, Australian rules footballer
- Shannon Motlop, Australian rules footballer
- Steven Motlop, Australian rules footballer
- Brandan Parfitt, Australian rules footballer
- Bobby Secretary; Land Rights activist
- Mathew Stokes, Australian rules footballer
- Miranda Tapsell, actress
- Fred Nadpur Waters, activist

== Sources ==
- "Australian PM ends longest running Aboriginal land claim". Reuters. 21 June 2016.
- Dixon, Robert M. W. (2002). Australian Languages: Their Nature and Development. Vol. 1. Cambridge University Press. ISBN 978-0-521-47378-1.
- Foelsche, Paul (1886). "Port Darwin: The Larrakia Tribe". In Curr, Edward Micklethwaite (ed.). The Australian race: its origin, languages, customs, place of landing in Australia and the routes by which it spread itself over the continent (PDF). Vol. 1. Melbourne: J. Ferres. pp. 250–259.
- Foelsche, Paul (1895). "On the Manners, Customs, &c., of some Tribes of the Aborigines, in the neighbourhood of Port Darwin and the West Coast of the Gulf of Carpentaria, North Australia". Journal of the Anthropological Institute of Great Britain and Ireland. 24: 190–198. JSTOR 2842215.
- Forde, Susan; Foxwell, Kerrie; Meadows, Michael (2009). Developing Dialogues: Indigenous and Ethnic Community Broadcasting in Australia. Bristol: Intellect Books. ISBN 978-1-841-50275-5.
- Francis, Adrienne (20 November 2012). "Remembering the long road to reconciliation". ABC News.
- Hope, Zach; Walsh, Christopher (6 April 2016). "Historic NT Kenbi land deal sealed after 37 years". NT News.
- "Kenbi Land Claim". Agreements, Treaties and Negotiated Settlements (ATNS) project. 22 November 2005.
- Levy, Ron (2002). "The Kembi Land Claim". Indigenous Law Bulletin. 16.
- Little; Fison, Lorimer; Howitt, Alfred William (1880). Kamilaroi and Kurnai (PDF). Melbourne: G Robinson.
- Mansfield, John (13 April 2006). "Risk v Northern Territory of Australia". Indigenous Law Bulletin.
- Parkhouse, T. A. (1895). "Native tongues in the neighbourhood of Port Darwin" (PDF). Transactions of the Royal Society of South Australia. 19: 1–18.
- Parkhouse, T. A. (1896). Native tribes of Port Darwin and its neighbourhood (PDF). Vol. 6. Australasian Association for the Advancement of Science. pp. 638–647.
- "Radio Larrakia94.5FM". Aboriginal Broadcasting Australia. 2017. Archived from the original on 9 March 2013.
- Rawlinson, Clare (2 July 2012a). Learning Larrakia: totem animal 'Dungalaba'. ABC Radio, NT.
- Rawlinson, Clare (6 July 2012b). Learning Larrakia: saltwater, 'Gunumijtanda'. ABC Radio, NT.
- Reid, Gordon (1990). A Picnic with the Natives: Aboriginal-European relations in the Northern Territory to 1910. University of Melbourne Press. ISBN 0522844197.
- Roman, Sue; Harvey, Mark (2003). A Living Culture in a Changing World – A Tribute to Yirra (PDF). Larrakia Language Project.
- Stokes, John Lort (1846). Discoveries in Australia, Volume 2. T & W Boone.
- Sturt; Taplin, George (1879). "Larreekiya tribe" (PDF). Folklore, manners, customs and languages of the South Australian aborigines. Adelaide: E Spiller, Acting Government Printer. p. 92.
- Tindale, Norman Barnett (1974). "Larakia (NT)". Aboriginal Tribes of Australia: Their Terrain, Environmental Controls, Distribution, Limits, and Proper Names. Australian National University. ISBN 978-0-708-10741-6. Archived from the original on 20 March 2020.
- Welle, Samantha (2000). "Labour, Control and Protection: The Kahlin Aboriginal Compound, 1911-38 pp.64-74". In Read, Peter (ed.). Settlement: A History of Australian Indigenous Housing. Aboriginal Studies Press. ISBN 978-0-855-75363-4.
