= Charles Dashwood (judge) =

Australian politician and judge

Charles James Dashwood, KC (17 July 1842 – 8 July 1919) was an Australian public servant and judge. He was the longest-serving Government Resident of the Northern Territory, and showed a concern for the rights of Aborigines.

== Early life and education ==
Dashwood was born on 17 July 1842 at Dashwood's Gully near Kangarilla, South Australia. His parents were English-born Captain George Frederick Dashwood, a naval officer and public servant, and Sarah Rebecca née Loine. He was educated at the Collegiate School of St Peter in Adelaide and later completed a year's study of civil engineering at the University of Ghent in Belgium.

== Political and legal career ==
After studying in Belgium, Dashwood returned to Australia and spent six years working as a farmer. He then entered the legal profession, spending some time working as a clerk of courts before being admitted to the Bar in 1873. Initially, he worked in partnership with W. H. Bundey, and with E. W. Hawker as "Bundey, Dashwood & Hawker" from 1879 to 1883. He practised alone from 1884 until 1890, at which point he began working with C. G. Varley. While working as a solicitor, he also began his political career, representing Noarlunga in the House of Assembly from 1887 to 1892.

On 24 February 1892, Dashwood was appointed judge and Government Resident of the Northern Territory. He was the first Australian-born individual to hold this position, and he also became the longest-serving, continuing in office for 13 years. In this position, he initially became known as a "hanging judge" for his predilection in handing down sentences of capital punishment, in particular regarding verdicts applying to Aboriginal Australians. In single week in February 1893 he sentenced ten Aboriginal men to death, although all but two were later commuted. The first legal executions in the Northern Territory occurred under his administration with a total of six people (four Indigenous and two Chinese) being hanged while he was in charge. Notable Indigenous men such as Charlie Flannigan and Wandi Wandi were executed under Dashwood.

He later changed his viewpoint somewhat and became concerned for the defence of basic Aboriginal rights. The Northern Territory Times and Gazette praised his approach on more than one occasion, writing of him in 1896 as 'the personification of kindness in his dealing with aborigines'. He spoke out against violence committed by Europeans against Aborigines, warned against securing convictions solely on the basis of confessions, and was sometimes lenient in his sentencing of Aborigines. In 1899, Dashwood proposed a bill to improve employment law for Aborigines, but this bill was rejected by the South Australian government.

After resigning from being Government Resident in January 1905, Dashwood continued to practise law, initially as the Crown Solicitor of South Australia before being appointed a King's Counsel in 1906. He continued in the legal profession until he retired in August 1916.

== Personal life ==
Dashwood was married twice. His first marriage was to Kate Allen, with whom he had one son outside of marriage. He later married Martha Margarethe Johanna Klevesahl, a fine mezzo-soprano, on 5 February 1916. They had no children. Sisters of Klevesahl married Charles Rasp and Angas Johnson.

He died from heart failure on 8 July 1919. Dashwood Place in Darwin is named in his honour.

Government offices
Preceded by John George Knight	Government Resident of the Northern Territory; 1892–1905	Succeeded by Charles Edward Herbert
