= Wadjiginy =

Indigenous Australian people

The Wadjiginy, also referred to historically as the Wagait, Waugite or Wogait, are an Indigenous Australian people of the Northern Territory, specifically from the area around Cox Peninsula to Anson Bay south-west of Darwin. The Wadjiginy are a saltwater people who describe themselves as wagatj 'beach-dwellers' from the Batjamalh word wagatj 'beach'.

== Name ==
The standard early ethnographic literature referred to the Wadjiginy with numerous variations of the word Wagait, a term taken to mean 'sea folk' by early investigators but which actually covers several tribes such as the Emmiyangal which later research has shown to be imprecise. Their ethnonym is derived from wagatj, a Batajamalh term for 'beach'. The modern descriptor used among the tribe is Wadyiginy.

== Country ==
The Wadjiginy territory was around Anson Bay, from the debouchment of the Daly River northwards past Point Blaze toward Bynoe Harbour. It was estimated by Norman Tindale to range over roughly 200 square miles (520 km^{2}). Their inland extension is estimated at 20 miles from the coast.

== History ==
=== European contact ===
Probably the first mention of Wadjiginy is from the journals of the navigator Phillip Parker King who sailed off the coast of their country in September 1819. He wrote that "sixteen or twenty natives were noticed upon the sandy beach that fronts the red cliffs on the eastern side of the bay, engaged in fishing, or perhaps in watching our movements; and this evening the smokes of their fires were observed", and that at some "red cliffs, two miles in length, rising immediately from the beach; upon which eight natives and a child were observed watching our movements".

=== Delissaville ===
From 1941, many Wadjiginy resided at Delissaville, an Aboriginal reserve on the Cox Peninsula. The residents at Delissaville would, on occasions, perform corroboree dances for tourists. World famous American dancer, Ted Shawn visited in 1947 and described the Aboriginal performers, especially a Wadjiginy man named Mosick (Johnny Bianomu), as world class artists.

=== Labour strikes ===
In the early 1950s, one of the leaders of the pioneering strike actions undertaken by Aboriginal people in the Northern Territory was a Wadjiginy man named Lawrence Wurrpen (also known as Lawrence Urban). He headed a protest march as part of the Corroboree Strikes to the government buildings in Darwin over poor wages and conditions for Aboriginal people. The marchers were broken up by the police and Wurrpen was arrested and jailed for 4 months with hard labour at Fannie Bay Gaol.

== Land rights ==
The Delissaville/Wagait/Larrakia Aboriginal Land Trust proscribes a significant amount of land for the traditional owners, a process not finalised until 2024 after the Kenbi land claim (Kenbi being the Wagait word for crocodile) was completed.

== Alternative names ==
- Ami, Amijangal
- Murinwargad (Murinbata term)
- Wagaidj, Wagite, Waggait, Waggite
- Waggote, Waggute
- Wargad (Murinbata exonym)
- Waugite,Worgait, Worgite, Worgaid, Wagait

== Sources ==
- Basedow, Herbert (1907). "Anthropological notes on the Western Coastal tribes of the Northern Territory of South Australia". Transactions of the Royal Society of South Australia. 31. Adelaide: 1–62 – via BHL.
- Dahl, Knut (1926). In Savage Australia: An Account of a Hunting and Collecting Expedition to Arnhem Land and Dampier Land (PDF). London: P. Allen & Sons. pp. 72–98.
- Eylmann, Erhard (1908). Die Eingeborenen der Kolonie Südaustralien (PDF). Berlin: D.Reimer – via Internet Archive.
- Foelsche, Paul (1895). "On the Manners, Customs, etc., of some Tribes of the Aborigines, in the neighbourhood of Port Darwin and the West Coast of the Gulf of Carpentaria, North Australia". The Journal of the Anthropological Institute of Great Britain and Ireland. 24. Adelaide: 190–198. JSTOR 2842215.
- Ford, Lysbeth Julie (1990). The Phonology and Morphology of Bachamal (Wogait) (PDF) (MA thesis). Australian National University.
- Ford, Lysbeth Julie (1998). A description of the Emmi language of the Northern Territory of Australia (PDF) (Doctoral thesis). Australian National University.
- Mackillop, Donald (1893). "Anthropological notes on the aboriginal tribes of the Daly River, North Australia" (PDF). Transactions of the Royal Society of South Australia. 17. Adelaide: 254–264 – via BHL.
- Marett, Allan; Barwick, Linda; Ford, Lysbeth Julie (2013). For the Sake of a Song: Wangga Songmen and Their Repertories. Sydney University Press. ISBN 978-1-920-89975-2.
- Stanner, W. E. H. (June 1934). "Ceremonial Economics of the Mulluk Mulluk and Madngella Tribes of the Daly River, North Australia. A Preliminary paper (continued)". Oceania. 4 (4): 458–471. doi:10.1002/j.1834-4461.1934.tb00122.x. JSTOR 27976164.
- Tindale, Norman Barnett (1974). "Wogait (NT)". Aboriginal Tribes of Australia: Their Terrain, Environmental Controls, Distribution, Limits, and Proper Names. Australian National University.
