= Billiamook =

Australian Aboriginal man (born c. 1853)

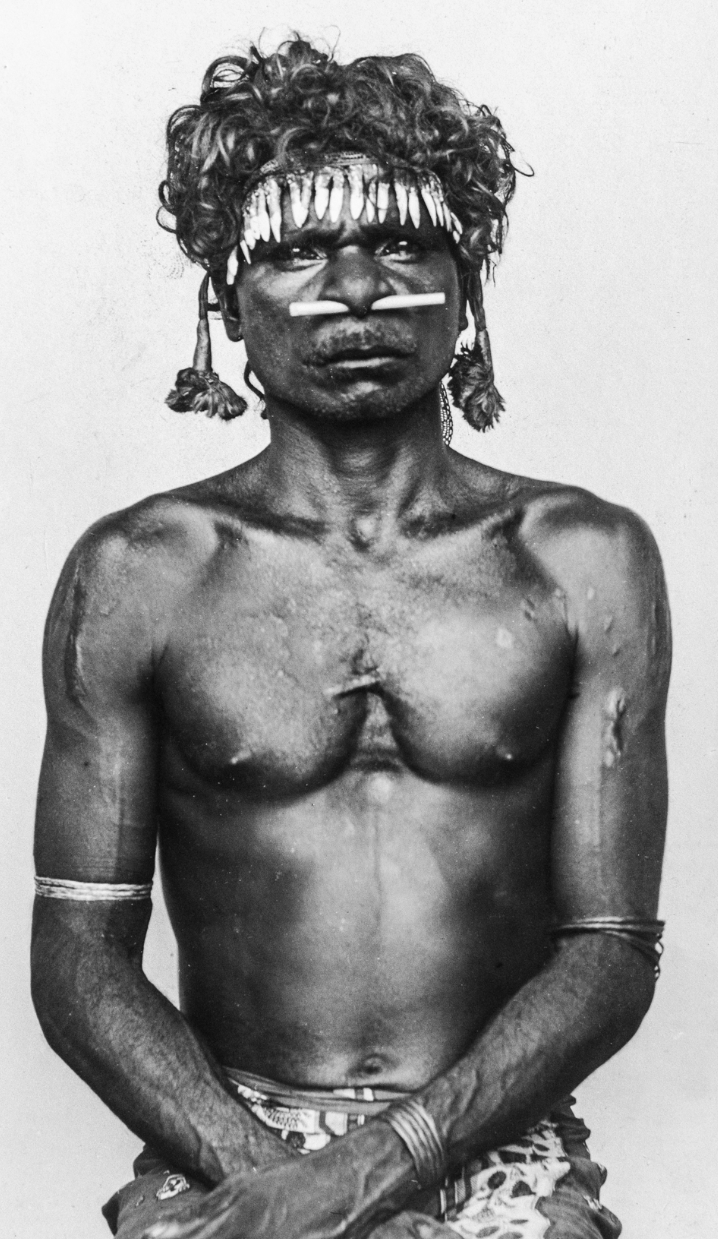
Photograph of Billiamook taken in 1886 by Paul Foelsche

Billiamook, Bellamuck, Billy Muck or Gapal (c.1850 – ?) was a Larrakia man who was one of the first Aboriginal people to interact with white settlers in Garamilla, in what is now known as Darwin in 1869.

== Life ==
Billiamook was about 16 years old when he met what he called the beragug (meaning: white men). He welcomed Goyder's survey team at Port Darwin alongside Umballa. As joking imitations of their real names Billiamook was nicknamed ‘Billy Muck’ and Umballa ‘Tom Powell’. One of his first interactions with them was offering William Webster Hoare a necklace of red beads. He offered significant assistance to the surveyors and, on one occasion, stood between his countrymen who were armed with spears, and the botanist Carl Heinrich Schultz over a dispute about sharing emu meat.

He and Umballa were shortly afterwards, taken to Adelaide in 1870 on the ship Omeo by Dominick Daniel Day (the husband of Harriet Douglas Daly), John McKinlay and John Davis. The stated aim of this trip was to impress on them ‘the number and power of the white races’ and convince their people to not enter hostilities with the new settlers. They remained there for six months and their presence in Adelaide caused concerns to a number of humanitarians who urged that they be returned to their homes.

Billiamook became a fluent speaker of English and became part of life in Darwin and acted as an interpreter and informant for several early settlers. Billiamook was described by William Brackley Wildey as "becoming a fluent speaker of English and one of the finest to demonstrate a remarkable ability to adopt to the European culture whilst retaining his responsibilities as a Larrakia".

There were some that believe he adapted too well to European culture and vices and he appeared several times before the Darwin Court for stealing liquor. On a number of occasions letters in pidgin, apparently written by Billiamook, were sent into Darwin newspapers and it remains unclear whether these were dictated by him or even approved by him.

In 1879 Billiamook was photographed several times by Paul Foelsche where he was rendered as an anthropological subject.

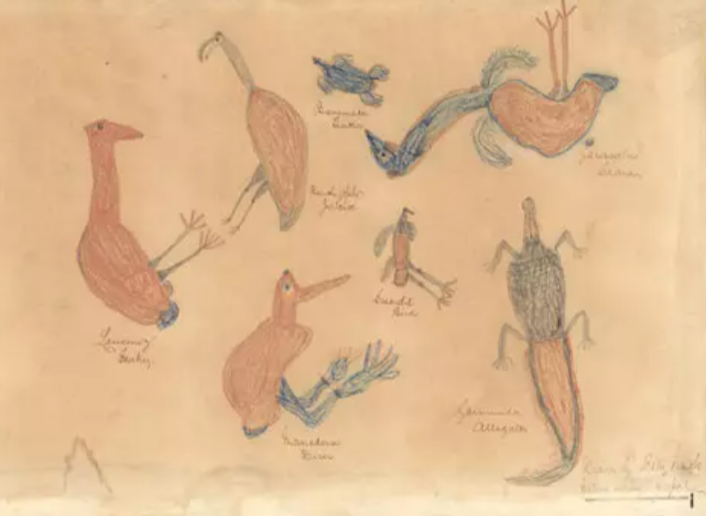
Drawing of various animals by Billiamook taken from "Dawn of Art" collection by J.G. Knight

In 1882 he was sworn in before the Court as an interpreter and, sometime after then, began acting as the interpreter for John George Knight, then Deputy Sheriff and Superintendent of Fannie Bay Gaol; he also spent time in the jail and an attempted escape is recorded in March 1878. In 1888 Knight sent lead and pencil drawings commissioned from some of the inmates, including those of Billiamook, to the Centennial International Exhibition in Melbourne. These drawings were entitled "The Dawn of Art" and they were the first display of Aboriginal art as art; Billiamook had two drawings in this exhibition.

There is no record of the date or time period of his death and the location of his grave is unknown.

== Legacy ==
The name Billiamook was sometimes recorded as Bellamack from which the suburb of Palmerston takes its name.

In 2020 artist Gary Lee reclaimed one of the Paul Foelsche portraits to challenge the ways his ancestors were categorised, and to explore the intersections between the artists own queerness and his identity as a Larrakia/Wardaman/Karajarri man.

== See also ==
- List of Indigenous Australian historical figures
