= Brown's Mart =

Coordinates: 12°27′55″S 130°50′39″E

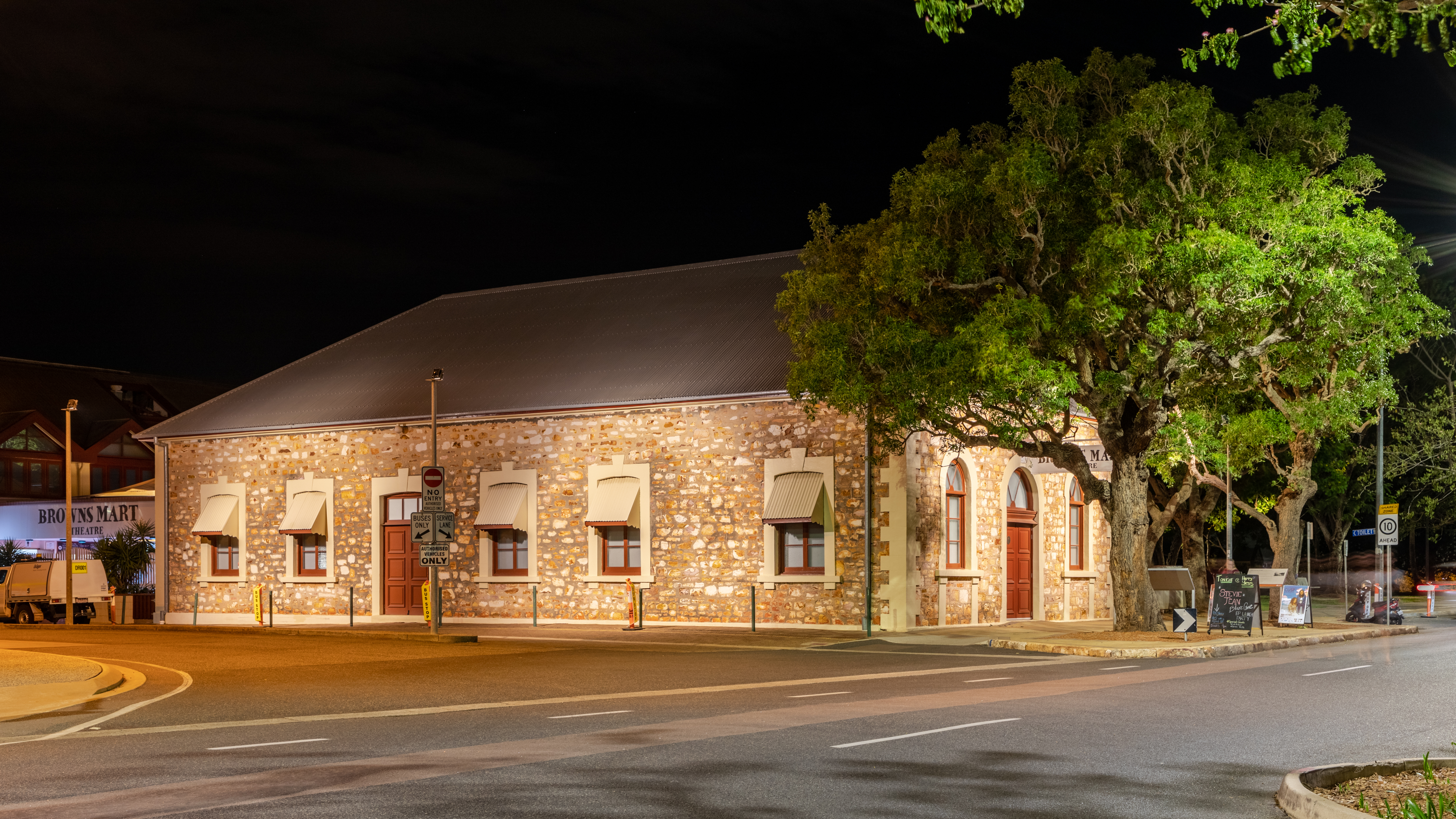
Brown's Mart Police Headquarters, Darwin

Brown's Mart, which now houses the Home of Territory Performing Arts, Brown's Mart Arts and the Brown's Mart Theatre, is a historic building located in Darwin in the Northern Territory of Australia.

== History ==
Brown's Mart is one of the oldest buildings in the city centre, being built in 1885 as a Mining Exchange by Mr Brown who was a trader and a Mayor of Darwin. John George Knight, Government Secretary and Architect who was also responsible for the design of the Town hall, Residency, Courthouse, Police Station and the Gaol at Fannie Bay.

Brown's Mart is of simple rectangular plan typical of early colonial buildings including semi circular arches over the front windows and doorway and simple decorations around the openings. Over the years it has been used in commerce, storage, as a shipping and insurance agency, mining exchange, auctions, meetings of local organisations, banking, defence, naval workshop, law, policing and the arts.

In August 1972, Brown's Mart Theatre was founded by Ken Conway, Darwin's first full-time community arts officer with the help of an $8,000 grant from the Australian Council for the Arts. This evolved into Brown's Mart Community Arts Project encouraging and initiating community based arts project which can be self-sufficient and self-generating. Brown's Mart has withstood the cyclones of 1897 and 1937, Tracy in 1974, and Marcus in 2018, as well as the wartime bombing in 1942 and 1943.

It was listed on the Northern Territory Heritage Register on 20 March 1996 and on the defunct Register of the National Estate on 21 October 1980.

Today Brown's Mart Arts operates year-round out of their offices at the Browns Mart Precinct, creating and supporting the creation of new performance work, as well as operating the venue's multiple performance spaces for hire to the community. They present performance work by Northern Territory Artists and support the development of these artist through many development programs, with core funding through the Northern Territory Government through Arts NT, as well as national project funding and philanthropy and donations. Brown's Mart Arts has Tax deductible Gift Recipient Status.

Brown's Mart supported the development and presentation of many plays written by the Victorian Premiers Prize winning playwright Mary Anne Butler. Brown's Mart is a venue during the Darwin Festival and the home of the Darwin Fringe Festival. For more than 5 years Brown's Mart has housed the Happy Yess and supported them to showcase local live music annually.

== Description ==
Brown's Mart is located on the corner of Smith Street and Harry Chan Avenue, Darwin, on Larrakia Country. Today it operates as an arts venue and organisation, creating professional and community arts events and productions, as well as hosting music, exhibitions, and other cultural events.
