= Bagot Community =

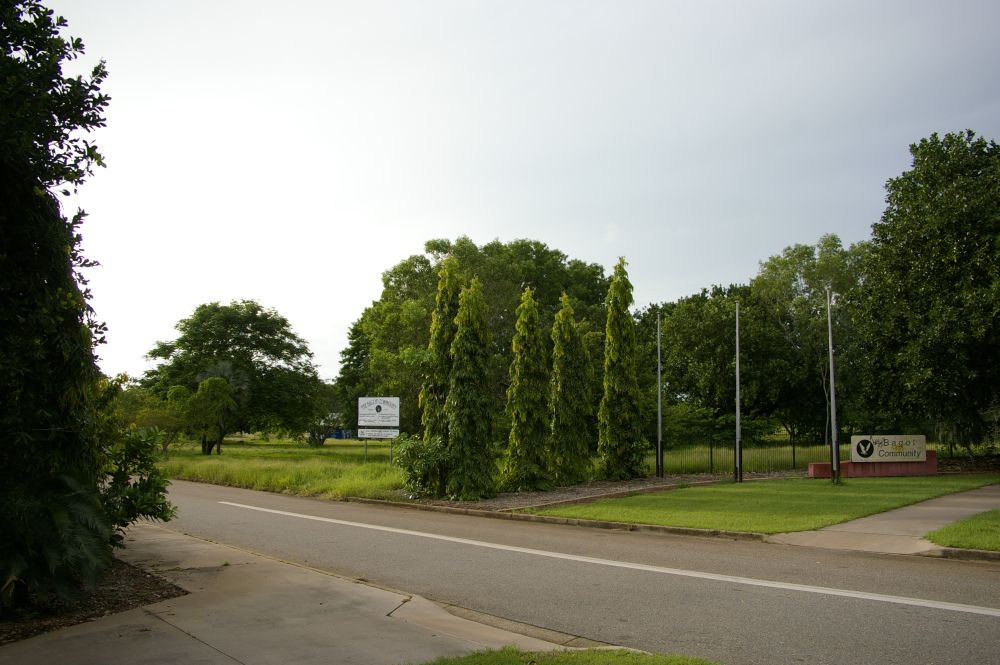
- Bagot Community

- Coordinates: 12°24′58″S 130°51′19″E
- Country: Australia
- State: Northern Territory
- City: Darwin
- Location: 6.5 km (4.0 mi) from Darwin

Population
  - Total: 265 (2016 census)

Bagot Community is an Aboriginal community in the Northern Territory of Australia located in Ludmilla, a northern suburb of the city of Darwin. It was established in 1938 as the Bagot Aboriginal Reserve, when the Aboriginal residents were moved from the Kahlin Compound, it was also sometimes referred to as the Bagot Road Aboriginal Reserve.

In 1979, it became a self-governing community, administered by an Aboriginal Community Council and known as the Bagot Aboriginal Community, but signposted and commonly known as the Bagot Community.

== History ==
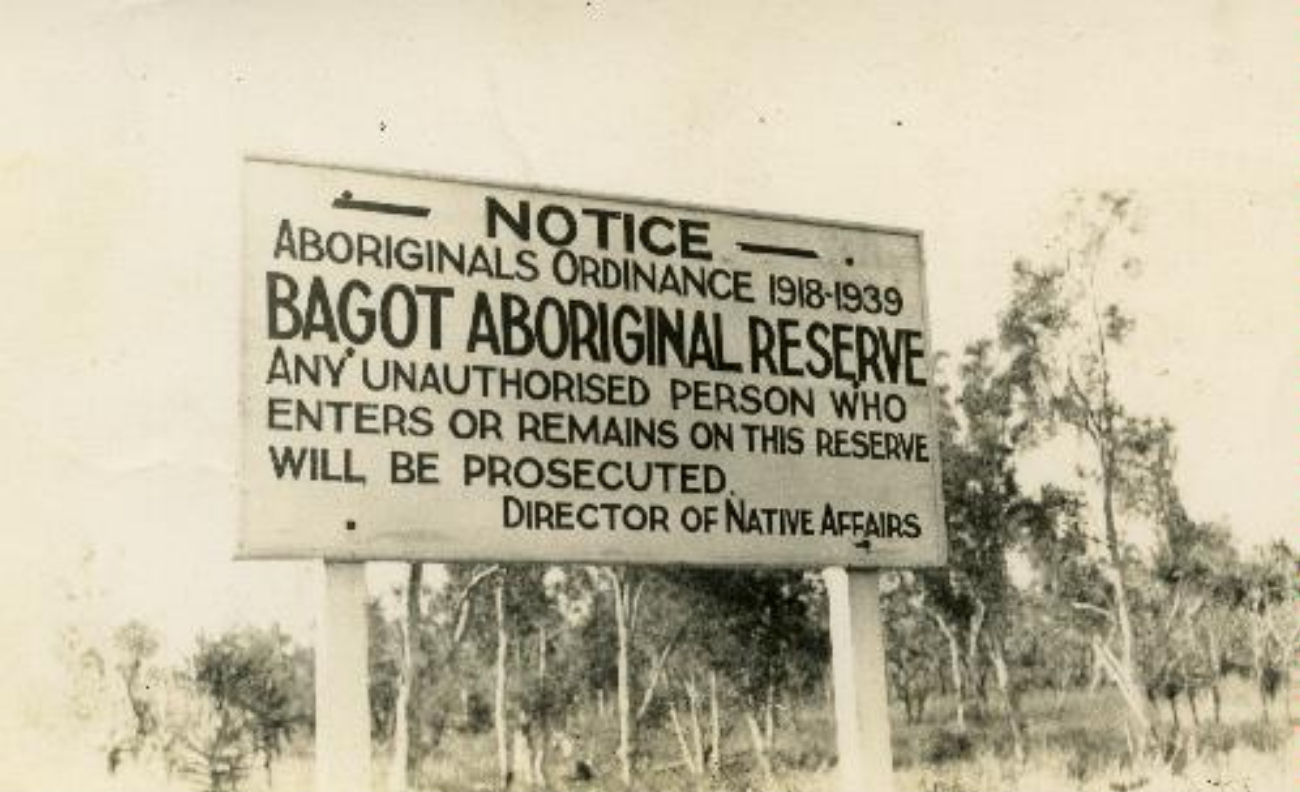
Notice outside Bagot Aboriginal Reserve c.1940

The Bagot Aboriginal Reserve was established in 1938 under Section 103 of the Crown Lands Ordinance, which allowed for the creation of Aboriginal reserves in the Northern Territory. Aboriginal residents were moved from the Kahlin Compound to the Bagot reserve. The Retta Dixon Home was located at the reserve. The origins of the reserve's name have not been recorded by the Northern Territory Place Names Committee.

Residents were subject to an enforced curfew and were liable to imprisonment for one month if found outside the reserve between 8pm and 5am.

In 1940, the reserve was taken over by the army to be used as a hospital with "all the half-caste children and mothers who had been living at the compound...evacuated to Pine Creek". "Full-blooded aborigines" who were residents had to be found alternative accommodation by their employers. The site sustained significant damage during the Japanese bombing of Darwin in 1942.

After WW2, the Berrimah Native Settlement became the main compound for Aboriginal residents in the Darwin area, which housed many Indigenous men who had worked for the army during the war. After several strikes (known as the Corroboree Strikes) by these Aboriginal men, the residents were moved from Berrimah to the redeveloped Bagot reserve in 1951.

In 1954, 22 boys from the reserve travelled to Toowoomba to perform a corroboree for Queen Elizabeth II.

In the late 1970s, the Reserve was handed over to Aboriginal custodians; thereafter it was known as the Bagot Aboriginal Community, but commonly referred to as the Bagot Community.

== Recent history ==
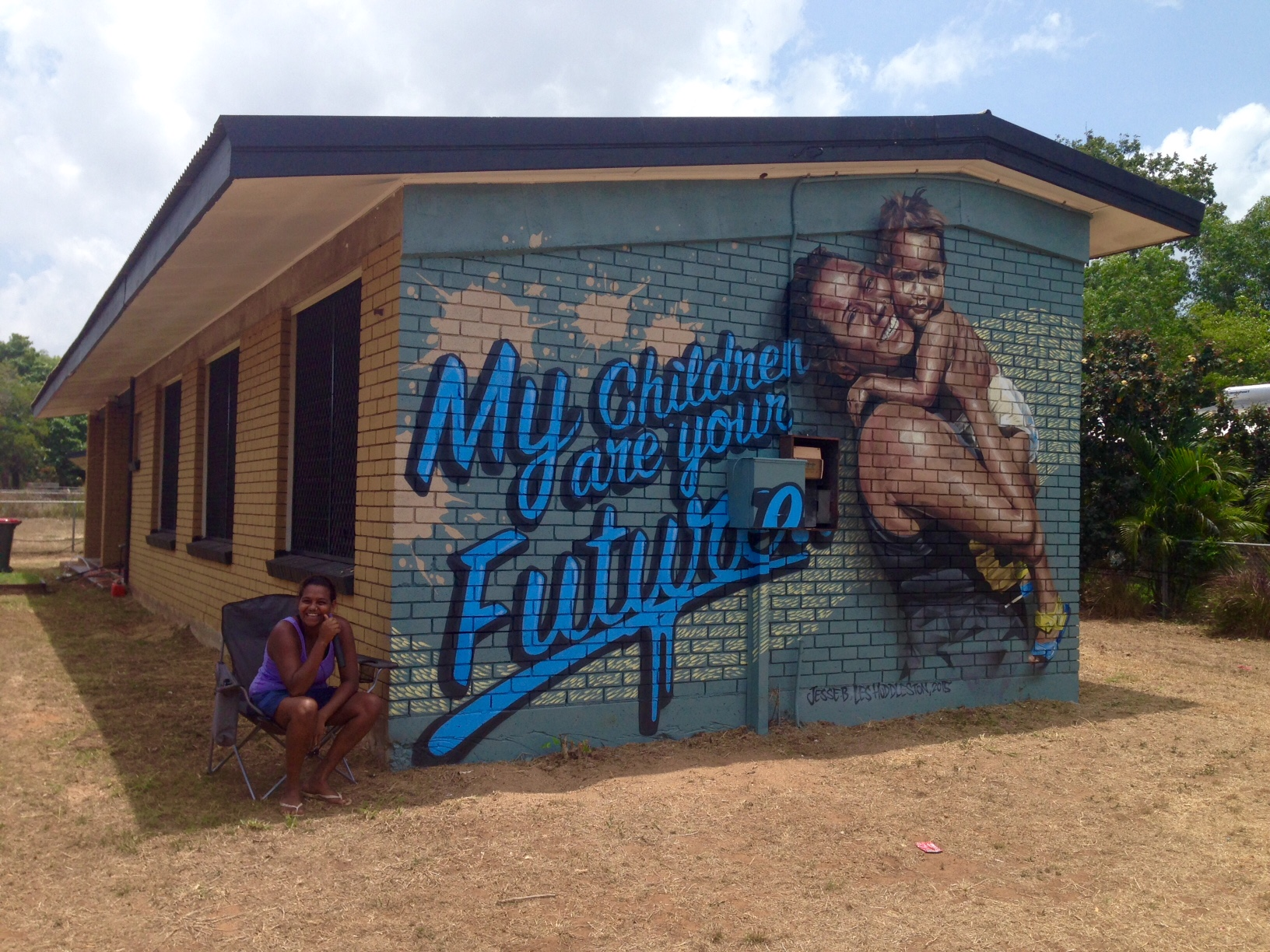
Bagot Community Painting Home Project

Bagot Community is run by the Bagot Community Incorporated (BCI). It faced financial difficulties in 2015 and was reportedly in administration with debts of more than $700,000. Commercial development of about 3 hectares (7.4 acres) of the Bagot Community site was then proposed. President of BCI Helen Fejo-Frith stated the development would "enable the Bagot Community to have a sustainable future".

Poor housing, alcohol problems and violence were cited as major concerns by residents in the run-up to the 2013 Australian election. Although the permanently resident population is only about 250 people, during the wet season, this can grow to 500–700, leading to chronic overcrowding.

In September 2013, moves to make Bagot into a suburb of Darwin were mooted, with the Northern Territory Government and the Larrakia Development Corporation (LDC) planning to turn Bagot into a normal suburb, embedded in Ludmilla. However Bagot Community Council said it would fight any attempts to hand over control to the LDC. For many years, the Larrakia were the predominant group at Bagot, but as of 2012, according to a paper by anthropologist Dr Bill Day, only two Larrakia families remained living permanently in the community.

A community celebration known as "The Bagot Festival" was held as part of Darwin Festival in 2014, featuring music, dance and art. In 2015, a painting project was undertaken at the community which saw a series of murals painted on the houses.

A project to upgrade much of the housing and infrastructure in Bagot was undertaken from 2018 to 2019 by the NT Government through its Town Camps Futures Unit.

== Facilities ==
The Bagot Clinic, a primary health care unit, is on Bagot Road.
