= Dolly Gurinyi Batcho =

Australian Aboriginal activist (c. 1905–1973)

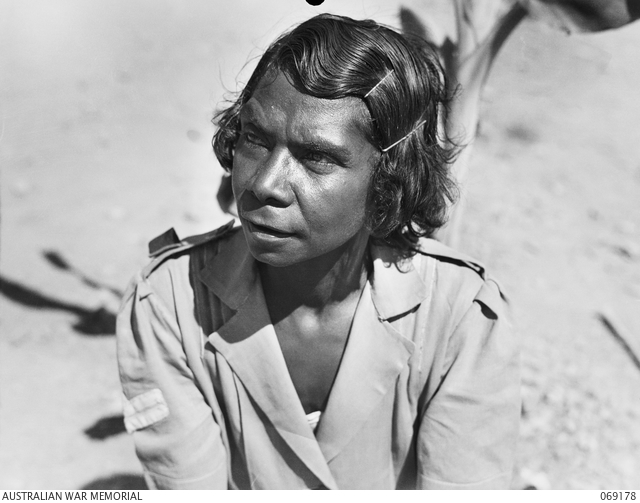
Dolly Gurinyi Batcho at the 69th Australian Women's Army Service (AWAS) Barracks.

Dolly Gurinya Batcho (c.1905 - 1973) was a Larrakia woman (part of the Danggalaba clan) from Darwin, Northern Territory and she was one of an estimated 6,000 Aboriginal and Torres Strait Islander people who worked in support of the war effort in World War II as a part of the Aboriginal Women's Hygiene Squad, 69th Australian Women's Army Service Barracks at Adelaide River.

After the war Batcho became a passionate advocate for the rights of Aboriginal people and for Land Rights; she was a signatory on the 1972 Larrakia Petition.

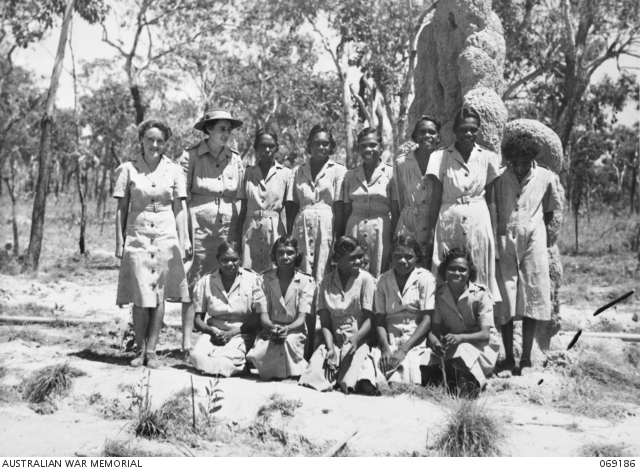
Adelaide River, NT [Northern Territory]. 4 September 1944. The 69th Australian Women's Army Service Barracks; Dolly pictured in the front row 2nd to the left.

== Service in World War II ==
Little is known of Batcho's early life, except that she left the Darwin area, which are her ancestors' lands, to serve the war effort in Adelaide River, which had become the headquarters for Australian and United States Troops, after the initial Bombing of Darwin. This was despite the fact that much of her family, along with 2,000 other women and children, were evacuated to Adelaide, South Australia. In choosing to do so Batcho took a great risk as Adelaide River was a dangerous place to be as it was regularly bombed during the Japanese bombing raids on Darwin.

In Adelaide River, she would become the head of the Aboriginal Women's Hygiene Unit at the 69th Australian Women's Army Service and given the unofficial rank of Corporal; she worked with many other Aboriginal women, most of which were known as Privates, ancillary staff who held no military rank or authority. Batcho and her team were responsible for much of the heavy lifting around the camp including the cleaning, laundry and yard work. They were important to the smooth running of the barracks and, on a tour of inspection, Lieutenant‐Colonel Eileen Parry made the point that “she had never seen such well‐laundered uniforms”. Despite this, reports of the time were often condescending towards Batcho, particularly regarding the way she wore her uniform with the strips on the front and "coy" colour patches on her should strap. This is seen in newspaper coverage in late 1944 when numerous newspapers around Australia reported the following of the Aboriginal women working for the Hygiene Squad:

They have bestowed upon themselves military ranks, and heroine of the party is "Corporal Dolly," whose stripes mean all the world to her though they, of course, have no official significance.

— Various newspapers including the Sydney Morning Herald, 21 October 1944

In 1945 journalist Ernestine Hill wrote about Batcho, who she also named only as "Corporal Dolly" in an article for The Chronicle (Adelaide) in which she spoke about the changing role of women in society during the war. Hill stated that many of the women serving would not put up with things like their mothers did and advised women to "take heart, girls, a new day is dawning". In the same article she also wrote that "high finance is quite beyond feminine intellect".

While at Adelaide River, Batcho experienced homesickness and so, in a hope of making her feel better, they collected a bucket of sand from Mindil Beach, while on a trip there for supplies, to help console her. Batcho was not able to make this visit herself as, because she was an Aboriginal woman, she was not allowed to enter Darwin herself. She wept openly when presented with it and thought it a truly generous gesture.

== Involvement in Land Rights ==
After the war, Batcho, alongside her husband George Mingaloo, became an advocate for her people; especially in relation to Land Rights.

She was a signatory to the 1972 Larrakia Petition which was intended for presentation to Princess Margaret on her visit to Darwin in 1972: this was a landmark document which was signed by more than 1,000 people. It sought to ask Elizabeth II for both Land Rights and political representation. It stated that:

The British settlers took our land. No treaties were signed with the tribe, Today we are refugees. Refugees in the country of our ancestors. We live in refugee camps - without land, without employment, without justice".

— 1972 Larrakia Petition to the Queen for land Rights, National Archives of Australia

In this instance they were specifically fighting for their ownership of Kulaluk, a stretch of coastline land near Darwin, to be acknowledged.

A group, including Batcho, waited outside Government House (Darwin) for 24-hours but did not receive the opportunity to present the petition to the princess and, tired of waiting, they attempted to break through the police barricade. The petition, which was three metres long, was torn in the process, so they patched it up and sticky taped it back together and posted it to Buckingham Palace with a letter. The petition was not seen by the Queen and was returned to Australia via the Governor General; it is now part of the collection of the National Archives of Australia.

Batcho also provided evidence to the Land Rights Commission in 1973, shortly before her death, in support of the Larrakia people's ultimately successful land rights claim. Her testimony involved visiting her ancestor's lands at the site of the Larrakeyah Barracks where she had grown up before it was built in 1932.

== Legacy ==
Batcho is one of more than 4,400 names list on the Australian War Memorial's Second World War Indigenous Service List. She was also featured in the digital exhibition, Facing Two Fronts: The Fight for Respect, by the National Archives of Australia.

She was respected in her community, described by her family members as a ‘wiry’ and ‘cheeky’ woman.
