= Malay Bay massacre =

Series of killings in Malay Bay during October 1892

Coordinates: 11.429°S 132.882°E

The Malay bay massacre occurred in proximity of Malay Bay (Wungaran), Bowen Straits situated in the northern region of Arnhem Land in the Northern Territory (then part of the Colony of South Australia), involved the killing of six Macassan fishermen by Indigenous Australians in October 1892. The suspected leader of the perpetrators, Wandy Wandy, was captured and later executed by hanging for the killings.

== Description ==
A pair of Macassan fishing vessels, each with a crew of three, anchored in Malay Bay after running short of water and other important provisions. Strong north-easterly winds forced one of the ships onto the shore, resulting in a large hole being smashed into the hull. The stranded crew sought the aid of a local group of Indigenous Australians in finding the nearest settlement. Some time after their stranding, the entire Macassan party were ambushed and killed by a group of Aboriginal people, led by Wandy Wandy, who had earlier been convicted of murder.

Wandy Wandy for his part in the murder of the six unnamed Malays was hanged on gallows constructed at the scene of the crime in Malay Bay, Bowen Straits on 25 July 1893.

== See also ==
- Maria massacre
- List of people legally executed in the Northern Territory
