= Corroboree Strikes =

Series of strike actions taken by Indigenous Australians in Darwin

The Corroboree Strikes is the name given to a series of pioneering strike actions taken by Indigenous Australians in the city of Darwin during the early 1950s. These were the first organised strikes taken by Aboriginal people in the Northern Territory, which brought national attention to the poor living and working conditions enforced upon them.

== Background ==
Under the federally legislated Aboriginal Ordinance Act of 1918, all Aboriginal people in the Northern Territory had their lives rigorously controlled by the government. This included a stipulation that all people deemed Aboriginal living in the Darwin area were required to reside only in designated compounds. The Act also legislated that most, if not all, the wage earnings received by Aboriginal people be paid into a government trust account to which the wage earner had very restricted access.

During World War 2, Aboriginal men employed by the army in the Darwin region experienced improved living standards and rates of pay, even though it was still significantly less than that of white employees. After the war, these men were forced back into the poor conditions imposed on them by the Act.

In 1947, around 100 Aboriginal men and women (mostly of Tiwi, Larrakia and Wagait background) went on strike over living conditions and rates of pay. At that point, the men were only being paid 10 shillings a week with another 20 shillings a week being withheld from them in the government trust account. The women were even worse off, receiving only 5 to 10 shillings a week. In comparison, male white workers in Darwin at this time would expect around £7 a week in pay, a considerable increase to that received by First Nations people.

This strike, which was the first ever organised by Aboriginal people in the Northern Territory, was led by a Tiwi man named Tommy Playup-Jimmy who demanded an increase in the male Aboriginal wage to £4/10/- per week. The strike ended after one day with the promise of further discussions with the government authorities. However, instructions were issued to the Minister of Native Affairs, Francis H. Moy, that if the Aborigines were to strike again, they would have their rations cut off and be starved as punishment.

== The Corroboree Strikes ==
In November 1950, conditions for First Nations people in Darwin had not improved. They were still being paid very low wages and being forced to live at Aboriginal compounds which were condemned as unfit for human habitation. Those living at the Berrimah Aboriginal Compound, which was around 200 people, refused to board the trucks which brought them into Darwin to work as domestic servants and labourers. The strikers demanded £7 a week pay and improved living conditions. The strike lasted a day.

By January 1951, the 200 inmates at Berrimah were on strike again, refusing to board the work trucks to take them into Darwin. The leaders, a Wagait man named Lawrence Wurrpen (also known as Lawrence Urban) and a police tracker named Bill Palata, headed a group of 32 Aboriginal men on a protest march to the government buildings in Darwin. The marchers were broken up by the police with Wurrpen and Palata being arrested. Palata was later released on bail, but Wurrpen was jailed for 4 months with hard labour at Fannie Bay Gaol.

The North Australian Workers Union became involved and Lawrence was replaced as leader of the strike action by a Larrakia man named Fred Nadpur Waters. Waters led a protest in February 1951 over the lack of action on Aboriginal wage reform and also the poor quality of food and housing at the Berrimah compound. He was quickly taken into custody and forcibly exiled to the small desert community of Haast's Bluff, over a thousand miles away from Darwin.

News of the arrest, jailing and exile of the Aboriginal strike leaders gained local and national attention. Aboriginal dancers who would conduct welcoming corroborees to cruise-ship tourists in Darwin refused to perform until Wurrpen and Waters were released. From this industrial action by the performers, the name Corroboree Strikes was afterwards used to describe this entire period of Aboriginal strikes in Darwin. Other similar protests in support of Wurrpen and Waters also occurred in Sydney and Melbourne.

== Aftermath ==
Waters was returned to Darwin from exile in March 1951, but continued to face intimidation from authorities by being fined and jailed. The highly dilapidated Berrimah Aboriginal Compound was shut in October 1951 and the residents moved to the improved facilities at the Bagot Aboriginal Reserve. However, according to the Administrator of the Northern Territory, Arthur Driver, this move was more about an enhanced ability for the government to maintain "control over the natives" at Bagot than improving their situation.
