= Bobby Secretary =

(1929 - 1984) Larrakia elder and Land Rights activist from Darwin

Bobby Secretary also known as Koolamurinee or Gwilamarinyi (1929 - 11 November 1984) was a Larrakia man and Aboriginal land rights leader and activist from Darwin in the Northern Territory of Australia.

He was instrumental in the fight for Kulaluk in Darwin and, as a part of the activism for the granting of this land to the Larrakia people he organised multiple protests in various forms, including the 1972 Larrakia Petition.

== Biography ==
Secretary was born in Darwin where he and his family, who are a part of the Danggalaba clan, had lived for millennia and they are recognised as the Traditional Owners of the region. He was the son of Frank Secretary (Balyun) and Lucy Danumal who were both key figures in the Larrakia community in the early 20th century.

In the 1960s Secretary became involved in Land Rights activism and, by the 1970s was involved in numerous land rights demonstrations and marches on behalf of the Larrakia people. Secretary called this fight Gwalwa Daraniki which, in the Laragiya language, means 'Our Land'.

Secretary, and other Larrakia people, decided to claim Kulaluk, a section of land in Coconut Grove, an inner suburb of Darwin, where they could live on land with access to the sea. This was significant as, until this point, many Larrakia people where living in reserves established for them on the outskirts of Darwin and, to practice their culture, they needed access to the sea.

They made the first formal land claim to Kulaluk on 21 May 1971 and initially received very little support from government due to the commercial value of this land. To advocate for this Secretary held a sit-in in Darwin, starting on 4 October 1971, alongside collecting a petition that was sent to the Northern Territory News. Following this Secretary and other Larrakia people raised the Larrakia flag (which they had created) outside the Supreme Court of the Northern Territory.

Secretary and Gwalwa Daraniki continued to protest and, in 1972, created the Larrakia Petition of which he was the first signatory; this is recongnised as being one of the most significant documents created by Aboriginal activists. This petition was for the Larrakia people but it was also designed to be a national effort and it included signatures from Aboriginal and Torres Strait Islander people from around Australia.

Throughout the remainder of the 1970s Secretary continued to advocate for Kulaluk and, on 23 August 1979, a special purpose lease was granted over 300 hectares (740 acres). Secretary was one of the people to endorse this lease and it was later changed, to give the Larrakia people greater rights, to a Crown Lease in perpetuity.

Secretary died on 11 November 1984 and is buried at Kulaluk.

== Personal life ==
Secretary was married to Bessie Murine and they had no children.
