= 1972 Larrakia Petition =

Aboriginal Australian land claims

The 1972 Larrakia Petition was a petition sent by the Larrakia people, the traditional owners of the Darwin region in the Northern Territory, to Queen Elizabeth II in October 1972. Seeking the establishment of formal land rights for First Nations people, the petition was 11 feet (3.4 m) long and contained around 1000 signatures. It is now considered a landmark document in the land rights movement in Australia.

== Background ==
The petition was made in response to Prime Minister William McMahon's refusal to negotiate a treaty with the Larrakia people following their March 1972 petition to him, which received no response. This petition requested that the federal government establish a commission to negotiate a treaty with the Larrakia people.

== The petition ==
The petition opened with the Gwalwa Daraniki, which means "our land" in the Larrakiya/Gulumirrgin language, and goes on to state that the land belongs to the Larrakia people; it was taken by the British; no treaties were signed; and that the Larrakia were being treated as refugees in their own country.

This petition sought the establishment of formal land rights for First Nations people and the recognition of their indissoluable connection to land. The immense size of the petition, which reached a length of 11 feet (3.4 m), was intended to symbolise the extent of national feelings of support for the Larrakia requests. The 1972 petition was signed by over 1,000 people from Aboriginal communities around Australia. The first signatory was Bobby Secretary, as Larrakia elder from Darwin. Another notable signatory was Dolly Gurinyi Batcho.

After the collection of the signatures, the Larrakia planned to deliver their message to the Queen via Princess Margaret during her visit to Darwin in October 1972, and they camped outside of Government House seeking to hand it to her. In response, a police barricade was set up and they were denied access. During the attempt to break through the barricade, the petition was torn.

The petition was then taped together and posted directly to Buckingham Palace along with a letter, dated 17 October 1972, apologising for its condition and explaining how it had occurred. The letter was signed by Robert Secretary, Fred Fogarty, David Daniels, Peter Mundine, and Harry Adam. The letter stated:

We waited for twenty-four hours to give our petition to the Princess. We wanted her to know the truth about the Aboriginal people of Australia. We gave a note to one of the Royal Aides telling Princess Margaret that we wished to present a petition. There was no reply.

— 1972 Larrakia Petition

=== Response ===
Staff at the Palace received the letter on 3 November 1972, then returned the petition to the Australian Government, via then Governor-General of Australia, Paul Hasluck, and it was placed on file.

A month after this Prime Minister Gough Whitlam was elected on a pledge to recognise Aboriginal land rights.

== Significance ==
The 1972 Larrakia Petition is a landmark document in the fight for Indigenous land rights in Australia, and helped drive momentum for the Woodward Royal Commission. As such it was a precursor for the Aboriginal Land Rights Act 1976. The petition is now held by the National Archives of Australia and it can be viewed in full online.

In 1979 the Larrakia people made their first formal land claim, the Kenbi Land Claim over the Cox Peninsula. It was eventually granted in 2006.

== See also ==
- Barunga Statement
- Uluru Statement from the Heart
- Yirrkala bark petitions
- Yirrkala Church Panels
