= Angas Johnson =

Australian medical practitioner (1873 – 1951)

Edward Angas Johnson (1873 – 19 June 1951), known as Angas or E. Angas Johnson, was City Health Officer of Adelaide, South Australia. His name has very frequently been misspelled as "Angus" Johnson.

== History ==
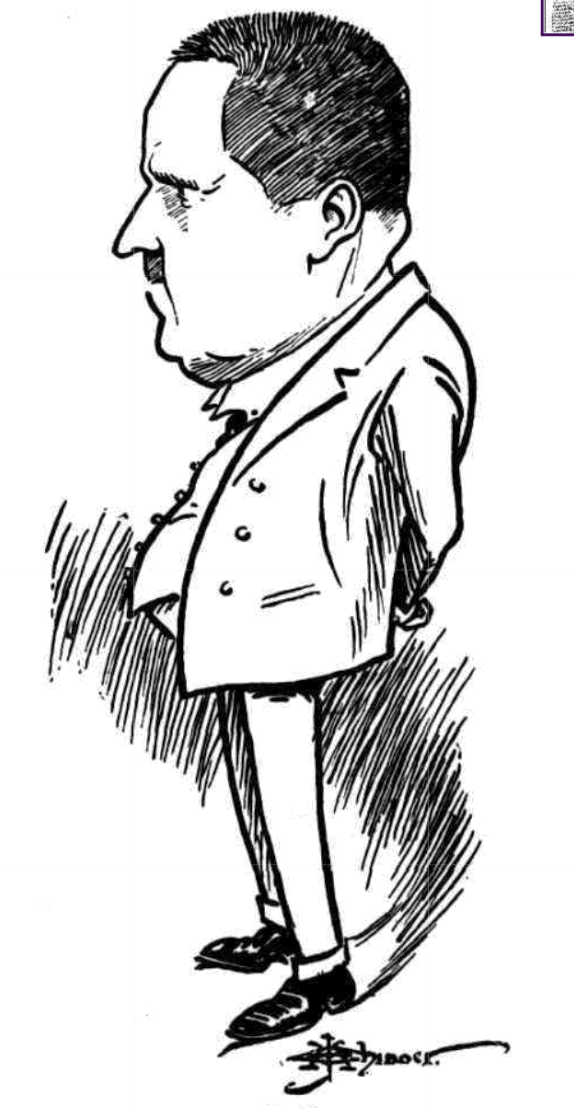
caricature by J. H. Chinner

Johnson was born in Angaston, South Australia to James Angas Johnson (1841 – 19 May 1902) and his wife Catharine Johnson, née Williams (1841–1909), who married in 1866. James Angas Johnson's mother, Rosetta French Johnson (25 April 1813 – 23 August 1898), later Hannay, was the eldest daughter of George Fife Angas. The Johnsons owned a magnificent property, "St Catharine's" in Prospect, later the administration centre of Blackfriars Priory School.

He was educated at Whinham College in North Adelaide, St Peter's College, and the University of Adelaide, but (with many others) was unable to complete the requirements of the Bachelor of Medicine degree in Adelaide because of the "Hospital Row", a toxic standoff between the Adelaide Hospital and the State Government in the mid- to late 1890s, (see Nurse Graham) and professional rivalries as exemplified by this exchange between Professor Archibald Watson and Dr Leith Napier, in which Johnson's name was mentioned. Hence, it was in Melbourne where he graduated in 1897, as did many others, or in Sydney, then took his ad eundem at Adelaide.

He served a year as house surgeon at the Adelaide Children's Hospital, then went to Germany, where he gained his doctorate at the University of Göttingen, and also studied at the Berlin University. In 1900 he worked at the Pasteur Institute under Professors Roux and Metchnikoff. He continued gaining experience and qualifications at the London, King's, and St Bartholomew's Hospitals. He studied at the London School of Tropical Medicine, under Sir Patrick Manson and Sir James Cantlie, and afterwards to Cambridge, where he studied preventive medicine with Professors George Nuttall and Sims Woodhead. He returned to South Australia and in 1902 was appointed hon. assistant physician at the Adelaide Hospital, and from 1909 to 1924 served there as honorary physician. From 1926 to 1942 he was the hospital's honorary sanitary adviser.

In December 1902 Johnson was elected to the Adelaide City Council to represent the Hindmarsh ward, but almost immediately required three months' leave of absence to visit Germany with his wife, whose mother was ill. He resigned a year later, in advance of another trip to Europe. In December 1907 he stood again for the same Ward, and was voted in by a large margin, holding the seat until he resigned in February 1924 as a necessary condition of being appointed Health Officer, a very senior position which also required him to resign his membership of the Adelaide Board of Health and its public health committee, of which he had been chairman for 14 years. He was at the time also:

- Senior physician at the Adelaide Hospital
- a member of the Adelaide Botanic Gardens board, and one of its Governors
- Inspector of Anatomy at the University of Adelaide
- a member of the Pure Foods and Drugs Board
- on the medico-legal panel of the Crown Law Department.
- member of the Consumption Board, the Fever Hospital board, and the Influenza Committee

He was a man of strong opinions, and took a contrary stand against his colleagues on several issues: He was skeptical about the effectiveness of Pasteurella bacteria in the control of rabbits as proposed in 1905 by Professor Danysz, and which had been elsewhere been greeted enthusiastically. He argued in 1937 against diphtheria immunization on the grounds that it was effective against the milder forms of the disease but might promote the more dangerous gravis strain. Concern was raised that his outspokenness might prompt parents to withdraw consent to a measure that had been proved both safe and effective.

== Other interests ==
- Johnson was an avid collector of curios, especially those connected with South Australian history, and dispersed most of them generously to appropriate institutions in his lifetime. Among them was an anchor from the brig Rapid, and a drawing by William Light.
- He was a member of the Field Naturalists Society of South Australia and its president 1902–1904.

== Family ==
Johnson married twice: to Margarethe Friedericke Charlotte "Greta" Klevesahl ( – 12 June 1936) in London on 27 September 1900. They had a home "St Margaret's" on Pirie Street in 1914 (became the Red Cross Blood Bank in 1954). She was a sister of Mrs Charles Rasp of "Willyama", Medindie. (Note: A third sister, Martha Klevesahl, married C. J. Dashwood (died 1919) on 5 February 1916. She was a fine mezzo-soprano) They had one son, James Archibald Johnson (1902– ), later known as Dr James A. Angas Johnson.

He married again, to Dorothy Muriel Brandt (1890–1969) on 3 January 1939. He died at his home, 1 Baker Street, Glenelg South. His widow was still at that address in 1962.
