= John Kerney =

South Australian bushranger/criminal

John Kerney (c.1844 – 1 August 1892) was a South Australian criminal who adopted the sobriquet "Captain Thunderbolt", in imitation of the notorious bushranger Frederick Ward of New South Wales.

== The gang ==
John Kerney was a son of Helen (ca.1813–1888) and John Kerney (died ca.1885), cabinetmaker of Hindmarsh Square, Adelaide, and lay preacher of the Christian Israelite Church. They arrived in Adelaide when John was 10 months old.

John, his brother David (ca.1847 – ), and Thomas Field from Gawler Town, a member of the same church who was staying with the Kerneys, determined on a life of crime. John stole a double-barrelled gun from the carpenter Edward Warhurst, once Thomas's employer, of Sturt Street.

Thomas Creamer, John Martin and Robert Allen were occasional accomplices.

== The crimes ==
- John and David, separately and together, committed a large number of armed holdups of individuals. For some of these, innocent men were convicted (four were released in 1867). During one of these, a man called Langford was shot. It was while perpetrating these crimes that John began calling himself "Thunderbolt".
- On the evening of 19 May 1866, wearing black masks and carrying pistols and the shotgun, the three broke down the door of widow Ann Taylor at Payneham. Both barrels of the shotgun were fired, perhaps by Field, without causing any injury, Ann was thrown to the ground and threatened with a pistol; her gold watch and some other jewellery was taken.
- On 7 September 1866 John, claiming to be Thunderbolt, robbed Isaac and Joseph Harrington at Prospect at gunpoint. John Brookman of the Post Office, lashed out at him with a whip; Kerney fired a number of shots without causing any harm.
- Later in September 1866 David Kerney reported having been held up at gunpoint by two men, one calling himself "Thunderbolt". This would appear to have been a ruse.

== Capture and trial ==
In October 1866 John and David were caught as a result of information laid. Police constable Doyle arrested John at his father's shop and on 5 November searched his house in Hanson Street, Adelaide, finding four pistols, a shotgun and stolen jewellery. Thomas Field was apprehended at Strathalbyn by Paul Foelsche, later a noted police officer and photographer in the Northern Territory.

Thomas Field pleaded guilty to the robbery of Mrs Taylor and turned Queen's evidence. Public feeling was running high and the trial of John and David was postponed as it was feared the jury might be unduly prejudiced. In March 1867 the jury found both guilty, recommending mercy for David on account of his age. The Chief Justice sentenced both to death. This was later commuted to life imprisonment with hard labour, to be served at Dry Creek.

The editor of the Register wrote:

The recent proceedings in the Police Court conclusively prove that the cowardly and atrocious outrages in question have not been prompted by hunger or want; as, indeed, no one could ever have supposed they were who reflected upon their nature for a single moment. The eccentricity of crime is marvellous; and certainly the conduct of the scoundrels who have now fallen into the hands of justice is as unaccountable as it is scandalous. So clumsily has everything been managed, so little attempt has been made to keep the illegal business secret, that one might almost suppose the object and design of the robbers was to be found out. The conduct of John Kerney before going to Prospect Village, his remarks to his sister-in-law, his open confession after his return, his production of the watches which he had stolen when away, and, in fact, his whole career, as head of a gang of ruffians, would seem like that of a madman, were not his sanity but too plainly demonstrated in other aspects of his conduct. But the worst feature of these outrages is their murderous ferocity. To take a watch, or a purse, though illegal and deserving of severe punishment, is nothing in comparison with the ever-ready recourse to murderous weapons, which stamps the characters of these men, or at least some of them, with the brand of deepest infamy. A bloodthirstiness for which no excuse or palliation can be offered is strangely mixed up with the general characteristics of a miserable pickpocket

== Later lives ==
David Kerney was released for good behaviour after 14 years' prison. He married in 1881. He later changed his name to John Currie and found employment in Melbourne as a French polisher. He attempted suicide in September 1895, in a state of drunkenness, by cutting his throat.

John Kerney and Thomas Field were released a few months after David.

There is no record of any of the three committing another serious crime.
