= Fred Nadpur Waters =

Australian Aboriginal leader (c. 1900–1958)

Fred Nadpur Waters also known as Nadpur Waters or Fred Nadpur (c. 1900 - 7 October 1958) was a Larrakia man from Darwin in the Northern Territory of Australia. He led a series of strikes by Aboriginal people in Darwin between 1950 and 1951, known as the Corroboree Strikes, which led to him being sent away from his home leading to the High Court of Australia case Waters v Commonwealth in 1951.

== Life in the Northern Territory ==
Waters was born around 1900 in Darwin, in the Northern Territory, and he was a member of the Dannalba (Crocodile) clan. His mother was Kadjowi, also cited as Kowija, and details about his father where not recorded. Very little is known about Nadpur's early life. Around 1939 Nadpur entered a relationship with Maggie Shepherd, a Brikin woman, who had been raised at the Kahlin Compound. She was a widow and had four children with her first husband.

During World War II Waters and Shepherd where sent to the Mataranka Army Camp where they remained until 1945 at which point they returned to Darwin, after a brief stay in Adelaide River, where they lived in the Berrimah Compound. By 1951 they were living with one of Shepherds son's in Stuart Park.

From November 1950, when he was around 50 years old, Waters was involved in a series of strikes by Aboriginal people, known as the Corroboree Strikes, which demanded better working conditions, equal rights and full citizenship; they also demanded freedom to move within Darwin and the Northern Territory more broadly. This strike was backed by the North Australian Workers' Union, which was then under Communist Party of Australia leadership.

Waters was, initially, not the visible leader of the strike and did not become one until its early leader, Lawrence Wurrpun, was removed and he assumed public leadership and led the fourth strike on 12 February 1951. It was later claimed that Waters had arranged the strikes from the beginning but that he was believed to be because of the NAWU's tendency to hide the principle Aboriginal leaders in the background. It is known that Waters had been in talks with the NAWU for at least four years before the strikes.

Following his involvement in these strikes Waters was sent, against his will, to Haasts Bluff (Ikuntji) to avoid further strike action by the Director of Native Affairs (Francis Moy); this was more than 1,700 kilometres (1,100 mi) from his home in Darwin. This action was fully supported by the Commonwealth government and Moy's right to do so was held up by the High Court in Waters v Commonwealth on 19 March 1951. The decision was, however, unpopular in the media and the Australian trade union movement, supported by Alan Marshall and Douglas Nicholls, led a national campaign to allow him to return home. It was believed that being forced to remain in Haasts Bluff would kill Waters and it was called a 'desert concentration camp'.

During this period corroboree dancers in Darwin, and around Australia, refused to perform stating "No Fred, no Lawrence, no corroboree". Other protests which linked Aboriginal rights with the arts were also taking place across Australia.

In his autobiography Son of Alyandabu (1990) Joe McGinness said that this campaign led to the creation of the Victorian Council for Aboriginal Rights and it has also been linked to the creation of the Council for Aboriginal Rights in South Australia.

The Northern Territory Administration did allow Waters to return to Darwin only six weeks after he was originally sent there, rather than the planned six months. Waters was quoted as saying:

I will continue to fight for my people and will not rest until our demands are met in full

— Fred Napdpur Waters, Northern Standard, 30 March 1951

Waters died on 7 October 1958 in Darwin.
