= Chief Minister's Northern Territory Book History Awards =

The Chief Minister's Northern Territory History Book Award is the premier prize for written works pertaining to the history of the Northern Territory of Australia.

== Establishment ==
The award began in 2004. It was created to recognise "the scholarly, literary and creative achievements" of Australian writers and to encourage the documenting of history of the Northern Territory. The inaugural winner was Dr David Bridgman for "Acclimatisation: architecture at the Top End of Australia.

The award is administered by Northern Territory Library.

== Winners and finalists ==
Past winners and finalists include:

2026
Winner	Martin Thomas — Clever Men : How Worlds Collided on the Scientific Expedition to Arnhem Land of 1948
2025
Winner	Clare Wright — Naku Dharuk : The Bark Petitions
2024
Winner	Liam M. Brady and John Bradley — Jakarda Wuka (Too Many Stories)
2021
Winner	Sally May, Laura Rademaker, Donna Nadjamerrek and Julie Narndal Gumurdul — The Bible in Buffalo Country: Oenpelli Mission 1925–1931
Highly Commended	Maisie Austin and Matthew Stephen — The Cummings Family: Family, Belonging and Connection to Country
Finalists	Derek Pugh — Port Essington: The British in North Australia 1838–49; Brian Reid — Power and Protection: The contest between the Government Residents and the medical Protectors of the Aborigines in South Australia's Northern Territory
2020 (not awarded)
2019
Winner	Lyndon Megarrity — Northern Dreams: The Politics of Northern Development in Australia
Finalists	Laura Rademaker — Found in Translation: Many Meanings on a North Australian Mission; Maggie Brady — Teaching "proper" drinking? Clubs and pubs in Indigenous Australia
2018
Winner	Kathy De La Rue — A Stubborn City: Darwin 1911-1978
Finalists	Steven Farram — Charles James Kirkland: The Life and Times of a Pioneer Newspaperman in the Top End of Australia; Pam Oliver — The Intrepid Hilda Abbott: Author, Designer, Red Cross Officer, Political Wife, 1890-1984; Sid Anderson, John Kean, Professor Fred R Myers, Lisa Nolan, Dr Benedict Scambary, Luke Scholes, Long Jack Phillipus Tjakamarra, Michael Nelson Tjakamarra, Joseph Jurrah Tjapaltjarri, Bobby West Tjupurrula, Desmond Phillipus Tjupurrula and Margie West — Tjungunutja: from having come together
2017
Winner	Stuart Traynor — Alice Springs: From Singing Wire to Iconic Outback Town
Finalists	Deborah Bisa — Remember Me Kindly: A History of the Holtze Family in the Northern Territory; Claire Lowrie — Masters and Servants: Cultures of Empire in the Tropics; Charlie Ward — A Handful of Sand: The Gurindji Struggle, After the Walk-Off
2016
Winner	Adrian Vickers and Julia Martinez – The Pearl Frontier: Indonesian Labor and Indigenous Encounters in Australia's Northern Trading Network
Finalists	John Lamb - Silent pearls: old Japanese graves in Darwin and the history of pearling; Deborah Wilson - Different White People: Radical Activism For Aboriginal Rights 1946 – 1972; Yanyuwa, Marra, Garrwa and Gudanji families with Karin Riederer - Gulf Country Songbook: Yanyuwa, Marra, Garrwa and Gudanji Songs
2015
Winner	Dick Dakeyne – Radar Gunner
Finalists	Sophie Cunningham – Warning – The Story of Cyclone Tracy; Steven Farram - A History Written in Metal
2014
Winner	Helen Bond-Sharp – Maningrida
Finalists	Robyn Smith – Antecedents: the history of Ward Keller; Tom Lewis – Carrier Attack Darwin 1942
2013
Joint Winners	Jennifer Isaacs – Tiwi: art, history, culture and; Darrell Lewis – A Wild History: life and death on the Victoria River frontier
Finalists	Jane Lydon – The Flash of Recognition: photography and the emergence of indigenous rights; Noah Riseman – Defending Whose Country? : Indigenous soldiers in the Pacific War
2012
Joint Winners	Anthony Cooper – Darwin Spitfires: the Real Battle for Australia; Jack Cross – Great Central State
Finalists	Murray Seiffert – Gumbuli of Ngukurr: Aboriginal Elder in Arnhem Land
2011
Winner	Dr Mickey Dewar – Darwin – No Place Like Home
Finalists	Alan Powell – Northern Voyagers: Australia’s Monsoon Coast in Maritime History; Matthew Stephen – Contact Zones: Sport and Race in the Northern Territory, 1869–1953
2010
Winner	Peter Grose – An Awkward Truth
Finalists	
2009
Joint Winners	Banduk Marika – Yalangbara: art of the Djang’kawu; Vivien Johnson – Lives of the Papunya Tula Artists
Finalists	
2008
Winner	Philip Jones – Ochre and Rust
Finalists	Alex Kruger & Gerrard Waterford – Alone on the Soaks; Philip Jones & Anna Kenny – Australia's Muslim Cameleers; Baiba Berzins – Australia's Northern Secret: Tourism in the Northern Territory; Robert Foster & Amanda Nettlebeck – In the Name of the Law; Andrew McMillan – An Intruder's Guide to East Arnhem Land; Darrel Lewis – The Murranji Track
2007
Winner	Pam Oliver – Empty North: the Japanese presence and Australian reactions 1860s to 1942
Finalists	Glenice Yee — Through Chinese eyes: the Chinese experience in the Northern Territory 1874–2004; Liam Campbell — Darby: one hundred years in a changing culture
2006
Winner	Tony Roberts — Frontier Justice: A History of the Gulf Country To 1900 , Reviews:
Finalists	Marge Duminski — Southport Northern Territory 1869–2002 (Historical Society of the Northern Territory, 2005); Claire Henty-Gebert — Paint Me Black; Pearl Ogden — People of the Victoria River Region: An Album
2005
Winner	John Mulvaney — Paddy Cahill of Oenpelli Reviews:
Finalists	Kathy de la Rue — The Evolution of Darwin 1869–1911; Peter Monteath (ed) — The Diary of Emily Caroline Creaghe, Explorer
2004
Winner	David Bridgman — Acclimatisation: architecture at the top end of Australia
Finalists	Geraldine Byrne – Tom and Jack: A Frontier Story; Ivan Jordan – Their way: Towards an Indigenous Warlpiri Christianity; Brian Reid – The Menzies School of Health Research: Establishment, 1978–1997

== See also ==
- New South Wales Premier's History Awards
- List of history awards
- List of Australian literary awards
- Victorian Community History Awards
- Australian History Awards
- Prime Minister's Prize for Australian History
- Western Australian Premier's Book Awards
