= List of people legally executed in the Northern Territory =

This is a list of people executed in the Northern Territory. It lists people who were executed by British (and from 1901, Australian) authorities within the modern-day boundaries of the Northern Territory. For people executed in other parts of Australia, see the sidebar.

== List ==
- Charlie Flannigan (alias Charles McManus; a "half-caste") – 15 July 1893 – Hanged at Fannie Bay Gaol for the murder of Samuel Croker at Avergne Station in September 1892.
- Wandi Wandi (or Wandy Wandy) ("a Port Essington black") – 25 July 1893 – Hanged on gallows constructed at the scene of the crime at Malay Bay (Wungaran), Bowen Straits, for his part in the murder of six unnamed Malays who had been ship-wrecked.
- Moolooloorun (Aboriginal male) – 17 January 1895 – Hanged on gallows constructed at Crescent Lagoon, "near the scene of the crime" and in the presence of other members of his Aboriginal community, for the murder of an unnamed Chinese man at Mole's Hill, near the Roper River.
- Chung Yeung – 10 August 1899 – Hanged at Fannie Bay Gaol for the murder of Chee Hang at Yam Creek.
- Lem Kai – 10 August 1899 – Hanged at Fannie Bay Gaol for the murder of Chee Hang at Yam Creek.
- Jimmie (Aboriginal male, no given surname) – 8 April 1901 – Hanged on gallows constructed at Shaw's Creek, Victoria River, for the murder of John Larsen at Daly River.
- Tommy (Aboriginal male, no given surname) – 21 December 1905 – Hanged at Fannie Bay Gaol for the murders of Henry Edwards, Richard Frost and Nowra at Victoria River district.
- Koppio (Aboriginal male, no given surname) – 15 July 1913 – Hanged at Fannie Bay Gaol for the murders of Ching Loy and Lo Sin at the old Howley Mine.
- Jaroslav Koci – 8 August 1952 – Hanged at Fannie Bay Gaol for the murder of Darwin taxi-driver George Thomas Grantham.
- Jan Novotny – 8 August 1952 – Hanged at Fannie Bay Gaol for the murder of Darwin taxi-driver George Thomas Grantham.
