= John George Knight =

Australian architect (1826–1892)

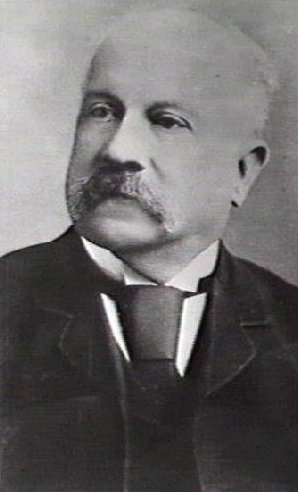
- Born: 1826; London, England
- Died: 10 January 1892 (aged 65); Darwin, Australia
- Occupation: Architect
- Awards: Fellow of the Royal Institute of British Architects; Associate of the Institution of Civil Engineers
- Buildings: Houses of Parliament (Melbourne)
- Projects: Melbourne ship canal and docks Gilded Pyramid

John George Knight (1826 – 10 January 1892), was an architect and Government Resident of the Northern Territory in Australia.

== Early life ==
Knight was born in London the son of John Knight, a stone and marble merchant.

He arrived in Melbourne, Australia in February 1852 and after a week on the goldfields, joined the Public Works Department.

== Northern Territory ==
In the 1880s, when he was Deputy Sheriff and Superintendent of Fannie Bay Gaol, he employed Billiamook as an interpreter. In 1888 Knight sent lead and pencil drawings commissioned from some of the inmates, including those of Billiamook to the Centennial International Exhibition in Melbourne. These drawings were entitled "The Dawn of Art" and they were the first display of Aboriginal art as art; Billiamook had two drawings in this exhibition.

Knight died in bed at the administrators residence on Sunday evening, 10 January 1892, of a severe asthma attack, following a long illness of bronchitis and influenza. Knight was survived by three sons, two married daughters and his wife, who was then living in London.

== See also ==
- Nightcliff

Government offices
Preceded by John Langdon Parsons	Government Resident of the Northern Territory; 1890–1892	Succeeded by Charles Dashwood
