= Paul Foelsche =

Australian police officer, photographer and plant collector

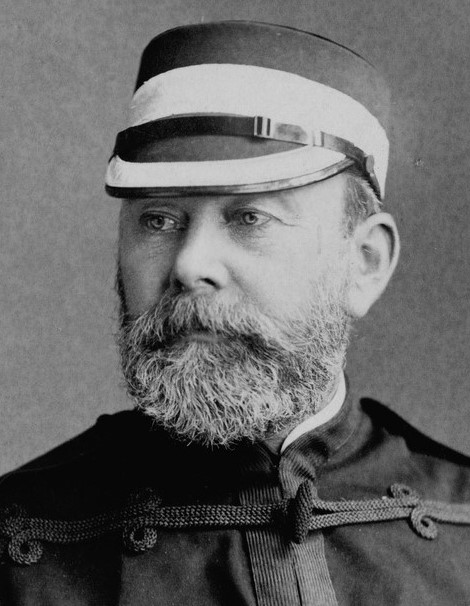
- Born: 30 March 1831; Moorburg
- Died: 31 January 1914; Darwin
- Occupations: Photographer, inspector, botanical collector, scientific collector
- Children: Mary Jane Andrews

Paul Foelsche ISO (30 March 1831 – 31 January 1914) was a South Australian police officer and photographer born in Germany, remembered for his work in the Northern Territory of Australia from 1870 to 1904.

== Early life ==
He was born Paul Heinrich Matthias Fölsche in Moorburg, Germany on the south bank of the river Elbe near Hamburg. His mother died when he was quite young; his father, a ropemaker, married again and had another six children. At seventeen he enlisted in the Prussian cavalry which was fighting Denmark over ownership of the Schleswig-Holstein region to the north, learning the use of weapons and becoming a proficient horseman and gunsmith.

== Career in Australia ==
=== South Australia ===
On 22 June 1854 he left Hamburg for Australia on the Reiherstieg, landing at Port Adelaide on 26 October. He may have headed, like so many, for the Victorian goldfields but in November 1856 he joined the South Australian mounted police as a police trooper and was posted to Strathalbyn early the following year. Among his many arrests was Thomas Field, a member of John Kerney's ("Captain Thunderbolt") (Note: Not to be confused with the far more notorious Captain Thunderbolt (Frederick Ward) of New South Wales) gang of thugs. His work entailed frequent contact with the local Aboriginal people, with whom he seemed to get on well. He received a steady stream of promotions (though punctuated by occasional demotions in response to budget cutbacks) until December 1869, when as Sub-Inspector (on a salary of £230) in December 1869 he was transferred to Palmerston in the Northern Territory, at that time the responsibility of South Australia. He was naturalised as a British citizen on 6 December. It is not known whether this was a condition of his employment in the North. His farewell dinner on 13 December was hugely attended, a testimony to his popularity and the regard the people of Strathalbyn had for him. He left on the Kohinoor on 16 December 1869, accompanied by J. Stokes Millner, then acting Government Resident (B. Douglas was appointed in April 1870). His Corporal, F. Drought and five troopers – W. Stretton, K. Kappler, H. J. Boord, H. Q. Smith, and J. Massey – were on the same boat (he had Smith and Boord recalled three months later for breaches of discipline).

=== Northern Territory ===
On arrival in Palmerston he found there was no Police Station and no help on offer from the Government Resident, so Foelsche and his six troopers had to build one themselves.

His introduction to the hinterland came immediately, with a short-term posting to the Roper River. His immediate superior was an Inspector in Adelaide, but he was also responsible to the Government Resident for day-to-day matters, a situation which caused occasional conflicts. His first residence in Palmerston was a two-roomed tin hut, later a small three roomed house in Mitchell Street. Late in 1870 his wife Charlotte and daughters Mary and Emma arrived in Darwin and for Foelsche, a dedicated family man, things looked brighter.

He was Keeper of the Palmerston Gaol from 1872 to 1874 when George Percy Badman was appointed.

Policing in the Northern Territory involved not only maintaining the law amongst the European settlers, but sorting out difficulties between them and Aboriginal people and to some extent among Aboriginal people themselves. He was promoted to Inspector around 1876.

With the discovery of gold around 1872 and the increased population that brought, mostly single men, then the arrival of Chinese miners, labourers and merchants who came to dominate the population, policing in the late 1870s became vastly more complex.

He was temporarily appointed Chief Warden for District A of the goldfields in October 1879 while J. G. Knight was on leave.

He was able to alert the Resident to the presence of cattle infected with "pleura" (perhaps tuberculosis).

He was appointed J.P. and Special Magistrate in 1884.

He was appointed Inspector of Taxation in April 1902.

He took leave of absence from February 1903.

He retired in January 1904.

Apart from photography, which absorbed much of his income and spare time, he took a great interest in aboriginal culture, was a skilled armourer and a capable dentist. He may have been offered the position of Government Resident in 1891.

=== Involvement in violence against Indigenous populations ===
Historians concur in showing that Foelsche played an important role, as the chief of police forces, in the violence inflicted upon Indigenous Australians in the Northern Territory.

Tony Roberts, known for his award-winning 2005 book Frontier Justice, depicts Foelsche as "merciless with Aboriginals":

The man who masterminded more massacres in the Territory than anyone else was Inspector Foelsche. A former soldier, he was cunning, devious and merciless with Aboriginals… Some considered him an expert on Aboriginals, not knowing that the skulls he studied were not merely collected by him.

In a personal letter, Foelsche openly spoke of what he called his "Nigger Hunt":

Of course you have seen all about our Nigger Hunt in the papers. … I left it to Stretton, and I could not have done better than he did so I am satisfied and so is the public here.

Foelsche's active role in the brutal colonisation of northern Australia is seldom acknowledged in textbooks and mainstream historical accounts, most of which were originally based on the perspective of European settlers at the end of the 19th century.

== Photography ==
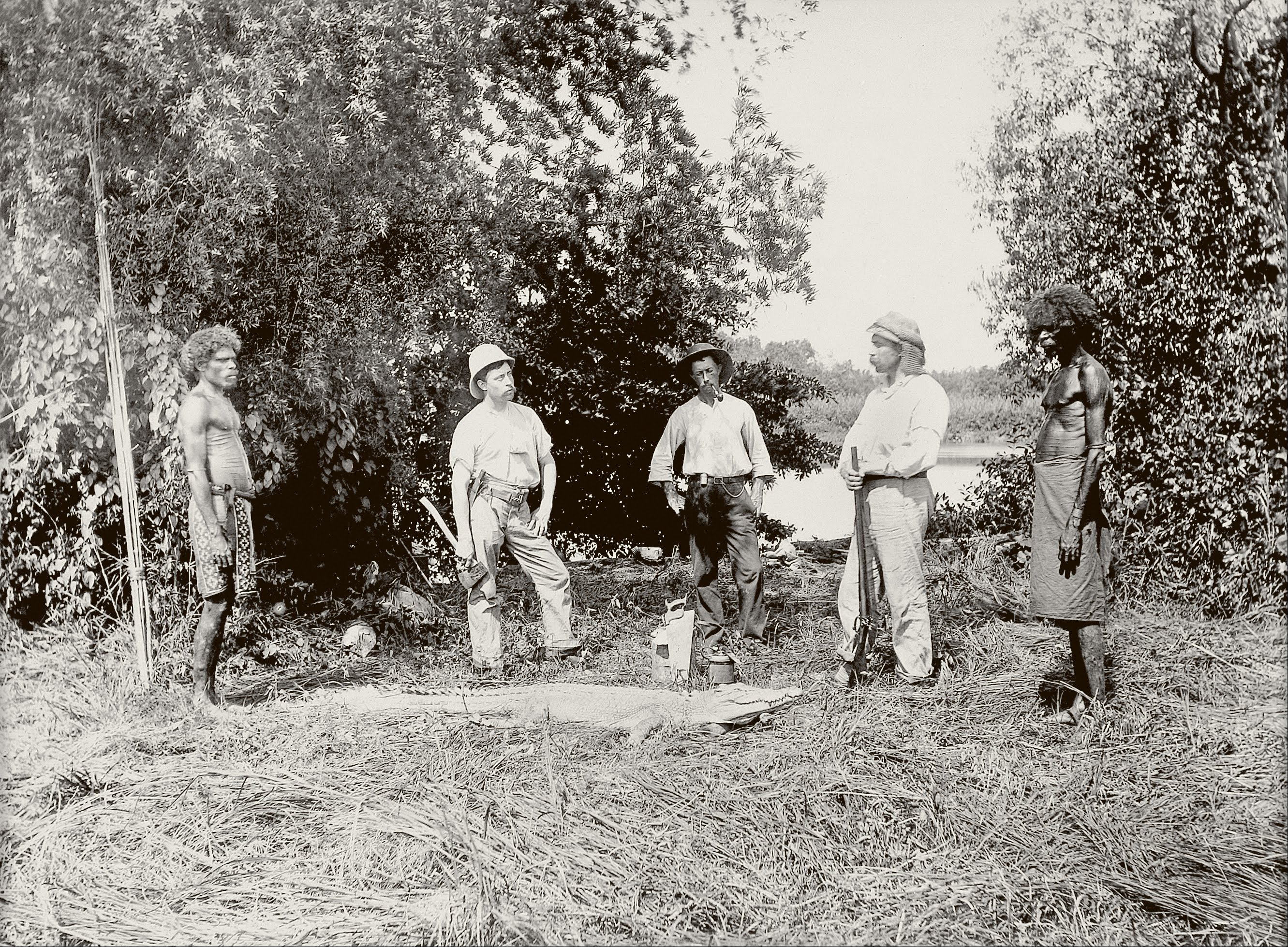
Paul Foelsche Dr Stirling, alligator shooting, Daly River, 1891

Foelsche learned much of the art and craft of photography during the years 1869–1871 from Samuel Sweet, captain of the schooner Gulnare, the Government supply vessel.

Paul Foelsche's photography first came to public notice in 1874, when he displayed photographs taken, with a Mr. Ludwig, of various Government buildings in Palmerston. Foelsche's camera made valuable historical records of early Territory life:

- Architectural photographs including the first police station (built by Foelsche and his men), Solomon's Emporium (now Brown's Mart) and the Commercial Bank building.
- Portraits of members of the Larrakia, Woolna (Djerimanga), Iwaidja and other aboriginal groups of the Top End.
- Aboriginal constructions, camps, ceremonies and activities
- Industry: scenes of mining, transportation and agriculture.
- Scenery, including views of the Katherine, Victoria, Elizabeth and Wickham rivers.
- Landmarks such as Charles Point lighthouse, A. C. Gregory's baobab tree, Adelaide River railway bridge.
- Historical reportage, including staged reconstructions such as the shooting of Ah Kim.

In 2005 the South Australian Museum mounted a travelling exhibition of Foelsche's work drawn from the South Australian Museum's Paul Foelsche Collection of 284 registered artefacts, interpreted with a great deal of historical information. The website reproduces the structure and much detail of the display.

== Anthropology ==
Foelsche took hundreds of portraits of Larrakia, Woolna (Djerimanga) and Iwaidja people, usefully annotated with the subjects' names and some personal details.

In response to a general plea by anthropologist E. M. Curr, Foelsche collected many aboriginal words and their meanings.

For E. C. Stirling, Director of the South Australian Museum, Foelsche collected numerous articles of common use by aboriginal people, annotated with their vernacular terms and usage. Stirling visited Palmerston in 1891 with the Governor of South Australia, Lord Kintore.

== Natural history ==
Foelsche struck up a correspondence with Ferdinand von Mueller of Melbourne, perhaps through an introduction by Maurice William Holtze, who founded Port Darwin's Botanical Gardens in 1878. Foelsche had a keen eye for rare and unusual plants and sent Mueller (who visited the Top End with the A. C. Gregory expedition of 1891) some 200 plant specimens, in the Melbourne Herbarium.

== Private life ==
Foelsche was a prominent Freemason; a member of the Milang Independent Order of Odd Fellows, appointed Grand Master in 1868. He was one of the founders of the Port Darwin Lodge.

He married Charlotte Georgina Smith (ca.1840 – 11 March 1899) on 5 January 1860. Charlotte was a daughter of a Strathalbyn carpenter and member of the Methodist church, which Paul joined (he had been brought up a Lutheran). They had two daughters:

- (Rosie) Emma (1860 – 9 January 1940 in England) married businessman H. W. H. Stevens (1852–1942) (Note: Hildebrand William Havelock Stevens was the author of Reminiscences of a Hard Case 1937) on 28 April 1884.
- Mary Jane (1863 – 19 May 1932) married railway engineer William Wallace Andrews, AM (28 May 1859 – 22 February 1924) on 25 October 1892 and moved to Moseley Street, Glenelg.

He died in 1914 after a year of suffering from gangrene, arteriosclerosis, and senility. He was survived by his two daughters.

== Criticism ==
It has been suggested that Foelsche's appointment to Port Darwin had much to do with the friends and contacts he made through Freemasonry: his intelligence, aptitude and courage were undoubted but he was unproven as a leader.

Contrary to many reports of his being the ideal man for the job for his cheerful courage in a hostile environment, he has been described as, at least until his family joined him in 1871, "one of the most embittered of all the Europeans in Darwin".

He was the butt of ridicule for the unbending stand he and a group of fellow religionists ('Octagonists') took in 1881 against prostitution among the aboriginal population. His determined efforts to learn the local languages should have won confidence among the local population for the police presence but failed to do so.

After the spearings of J. W. O. Bennett and William Guy in 1869, which resulted in the death of Bennett, Foelsche was accused of a heavy-handed response.

== Recognition ==
- Foelsche was presented with a gold hunter by the Kaiser after sending him a portfolio of Northern Territory photographs.
- Dendrobium foelschei (an orchid) and Eucalyptus foelscheana (the smooth-barked bloodwood, later renamed Corymbia foelscheana) were named in his honour by Ferdinand von Mueller, for whom he collected a large number of botanical specimens.
- He was awarded the Imperial Service Order by the South Australian Governor, Sir George Le Hunte in 1903.
- Foelsche Street, Darwin, Foelsche Bank, Foelsche Headland, Foelsche Rock, Foelsche River (and hence the nearby Foelsche crater), all in the Northern Territory, were named for him.
- A large selection of his photographs is on permanent display at Police Headquarters, Darwin.

== Bibliography ==
- Foelsche, Paul Notes on the Aborigines of North Australia Royal Society of South Australia, Adelaide 1882
- Foelsche, Paul Port Darwin: The Larrakia tribe part of book by E. M. Curr
