= Fannie Bay Gaol =

Historic prison in the Northern Territory, Australia

Coordinates: 12°25′30″S 130°50′11″E

- Interactive map of Fannie Bay Gaol
- Location: Fannie Bay, Northern Territory
- Status: Closed
- Security class: Minimum and Maximum Security
- Capacity: ?
- Opened: 1883
- Closed: 1979
- Managed by: Northern Territory Department of Community Development, Sport & Cultural Affairs

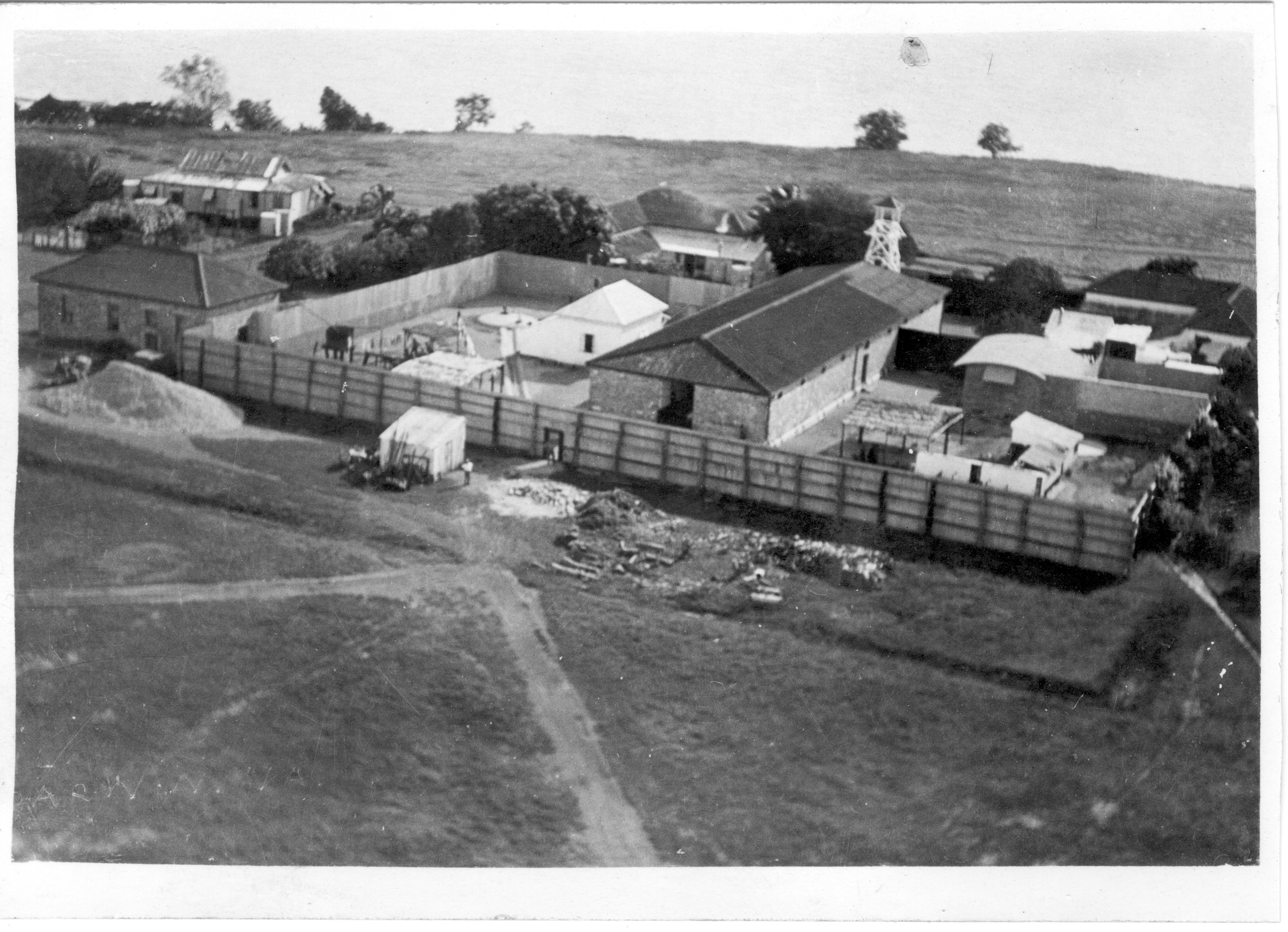
Fannie Bay Gaol in the 1940s

Fannie Bay Gaol is a historic gaol in Fannie Bay, Northern Territory, Australia. The gaol operated as Her Majesty's Gaol and Labour Prison, from 20 September 1883 until 1 September 1979. Glen SUTTON was the last Superintendent of Fannie Bay and the first Superintendent of the new gaol at Berrimah.

== History ==
In 1888, Deputy Sheriff (and later Government Resident) John George Knight collected sketches and drawings made by Aboriginal prisoners to be displayed at the Melbourne Centennial Exhibition under the title, The Dawn of Art. Dr Philip Jones, Senior Curator, Department of Anthropology, South Australian Museum, has called this the first exhibition of Aboriginal art.

The last executions in Darwin were held at Fannie Bay Gaol in 1952, when Jerry Coci and Jonus Novotny, Czechoslovak immigrants, were hanged for the murder of a taxi driver.

The gallows were constructed especially for this execution, in the infirmary. A pit was dug into the floor at one end of the building, with brick walls either side to support the beam. A small trapdoor and flight of steps led down into the pit for the doctor to examine the bodies after the drop. The prisoners were held in wire cages at the other end of the infirmary prior to execution.

The gallows remain on public view, and visitors can push the lever that operated the trap. The prison was damaged, along with much of Darwin, by Cyclone Tracy in 1974.

At first female prisoners were housed in the Gaoler's accommodation but in 1928 a female section was constructed and male and female prisoners were held in separate buildings. The female prison block included a small garden designed to keep the prisoners busy. There was also a block for children, which in the early 1970s was also used for refugees who had arrived by boat.

Two cells were placed in the middle of the lawn for violent or mentally ill inmates. These cells included a small yard encased with cyclone fencing. Maximum security cells included hooks mounted into the walls for the restraint of inmates and very narrow doorways to prevent inmates escaping when a guard entered.

The gaol was listed on the now-defunct Register of the National Estate in 1983 and on the Northern Territory Heritage Register in 1995.

On 1 September 1979, prisoners were relocated to the newly-built correctional facility located in Berrimah and the gaol was officially closed in October 1980.

It is now a museum open to the public.

== Notable prisoners ==
- Harold Nelson – imprisoned in 1921 for his 'no taxation without representation' campaign, that ultimately led to the Darwin Rebellion.
- Nemarluk was wanted for the murder of three Japanese fishers from the Ouida near modern-day Wadeye in 1930 but evaded capture for two years. Eventually caught and awaiting trial, he escaped from a prison work party and was at large for a further six months. Although sentenced to hang, the sentence was commuted but he died of pneumonia while still serving time.
- Ray Raiwala who was convicted of killing a medicine man at the mission at Milingimbi; he was initially sentenced to death but this was commuted to a life sentence. He, alongside 3 other men, were then released in 1934 due to the court recognising their rights to practice traditional law.

== See also ==
- List of Australian prisons
- List of people legally executed in the Northern Territory

== Bibliography ==
- Dewar, Mickey (1999). Inside-Out: A Social History of Fannie Bay Gaol. Darwin: NTU Press.
- Forrest, Peter (2002). "Last Men to Hang for Murder." Northern Territory News. 6 August.
- O'Toole, Sean (2006). The History of Australian Corrections. Sydney: University of New South Wales Press.
- Troppo Architects (1996). Fannie Bay Gaol: A Structural History and Data Base. Vol. 1. Darwin.
