= Mati Ke =

Aboriginal Australian people

The Mati Ke, also known as the Magatige, are an Aboriginal Australian people, whose traditional lands are located in the Wadeye area in the Northern Territory. Their language is in serious danger of extinction, but there is a language revival project under way to preserve it.

== Language ==
Mati Ke, also known as Magati-Ge, Magadige, Marti Ke, Magati Gair, is classified as one of the Western Daly languages, and bearing close affinities to Marringarr and Marrithiyel. In 1983 around 30 fluent speakers of the language survived, and by the early 2000s, some 50 people were thought to still speak some of it as a second or third language.

By the early 2000s the last completely fluent speakers were reckoned to be three people, Johnny Chula, Patrick Nudjulu (b.1927) and his sister Agatha Perdjert, both of whom who moved back to a government-built outstation at Kuy on the Shores facing the Timor Sea. Though living in close proximity to one another, they never spoke it together since in their social system communication between brother and sister after puberty was forbidden.

== Country ==
Norman Tindale estimates that the Mati Ke's Country extended over some 150 square miles. (400 sq. km.) running along 20 miles in from the coast north of Port Keats including Tree Point, and the area south of the Moyle River swamplands.

== Social organization ==
The clan, constituted by two 'hordes', and totem system was described by the Norwegian ethnologist Johannes Falkenberg in 1962, based on fieldwork conducted in 1950.

One clan is known as the Rak Yeddairt (Yek Yederr), with as of 2009 73 members, the other was called Rak Kuy (Note: A variant, Rak Naniny/Rak Kuy/ Yek Naning clan is given by both Rebgetz., and Ivory) whose last custodian was Patrick Nudjulu, (Note: Nudjulu, who was afflicted by leprosy, was fluent in several aboriginal languages, apart from English.) with 63 members.

== History ==
The Mati Ke were one of several tribes living south of Wadeye between the Moyle and Fitzmaurice rivers. Many moved to Wadeye when a Catholic mission was set up there in 1935, with Our Lady of the Sacred Heart missionaries. Gradually descendants of the tribe dropped using their Mati Ke speech and adopted the majority language in the area, Murrinh-Patha, which is spoken by about 2500 people and serves as a lingua franca for several other ethnic groups.

== Alternative names ==
- Maritige
- Muringata
- Muringa (Murinbata exonym)
- Muringe
- Berinken, Berinkin, Berringin
- Brinken, Brinkan
- Marrige

== Sources ==
- Abley, Mark (2005). Spoken Here: Travels Among Threatened Languages. Houghton-Mifflin. ISBN 978-0-618-56583-2.
- Basedow, Herbert (1907). "Anthropological notes on the Western Coastal tribes of the Northern Territory of South Australia". Journal of the Transactions of the Royal Society of South Australia. 31: 1–62.
- Capell, Arthur (March 1940). "Classification of languages in North and North-West Australia". Oceania. 10 (3): 241–272. doi:10.1002/j.1834-4461.1940.tb00292.x. JSTOR 40327769.
- Capell, Arthur (June 1945). "Classification of languages in North and North-West Australia (continued)". Oceania. 10 (4): 404–443. doi:10.1002/j.1834-4461.1940.tb00304.x. JSTOR 40327866.
- Davidson, D. S. (January–June 1935). "Archaeological Problems of Northern Australia". The Journal of the Royal Anthropological Institute of Great Britain and Ireland. 65: 145–183. doi:10.2307/2843847. JSTOR 2843847.
- Falkenberg, Johannes (1962). Kin and Totem: Group Relations of Australian Aborigines in the Port Keats District. Allen & Unwin.
- Green, Ian (1989). Marrithiyel: a language of the Daly River region of Australia's Northern Territory. Australian National University:.
- Grimes, Barbara Dix (2003). "Daly Languages". In Frawley, William (ed.). International Encyclopedia of Linguistics: AAVE-Esperanto (Thesis). Vol. 1 (2nd ed.). Oxford University Press. pp. 415–416. ISBN 978-0-195-13977-8.
- Ivory, Bill (2009). KUNMANGGUR, Legend and Leadership. A Study of Indigenous Leadership and Succession Focussing on the Northwest Region of the Northern Territory of Australia (PDF) (Thesis). Charles Darwin University.
- McMahon, Barbara (28 June 2007). "Aborigines of Wadeye: a portrait of neglect". Taipei Times.
- Michaels, Walter Benn (2007). The Trouble with Diversity: How We Learned to Love Identity and Ignore Inequality. Macmillan. ISBN 978-1-466-81881-1.
- Needham, Rodney (December 1962). "Review: Kin and Totem: Group Relations of Australian Aborigines in the Port Keats District by Johannes Falkenberg". American Anthropologist. 64 (6): 1316–1318. doi:10.1525/aa.1962.64.6.02a00200. JSTOR 667861.
- Rebgetz, Louisa (8 February 2010). "The race to save Indigenous languages". ABC News.
- Stanner, W. E. H. (December 1933). "Ceremonial Economics of the Mulluk Mulluk and Madngella Tribes of the Daly River, North Australia. A Preliminary Paper". Oceania. 4 (2): 156–175. doi:10.1002/j.1834-4461.1933.tb00098.x. JSTOR 40327457.
- Street, Chester S (1987). The Language and Culture of the Murrinh-Patha. Summer Institute of Linguistics. ISBN 978-0-868-92319-2.
- Tindale, Norman Barnett (1974). "Magatige (NT)". Aboriginal Tribes of Australia: Their Terrain, Environmental Controls, Distribution, Limits, and Proper Names. Australian National University. ISBN 978-0-708-10741-6.
