= Emmiyangal =

The Emmiyangal, also known as the Amijangal, are an indigenous Australian people of the Northern Territory in Australia,

== Language ==
Emmi is one of the Marranj languages of the Western Daly family once widely spoken on the coast of Anson Bay southwest of Darwin. It may be mutually intelligible with Patjtjamalh.

The leading authority on the Emmiyangal, Lysbeth Ford, estimated in the late 90s that Emmi had approximately two dozen speakers. In 2003 Barbara Grimes set the figure at around 30.

== Country ==
The Emmiyangal are an Anson Bay people. Norman Tindale calculated their tribal lands at around 100 square miles (260 km^{2}). More precisely Bill Stranner located the Emmiyangal on the coastal area running south (Note: Arthur Capell however placed them on the north of the Daly,) where the Daly River, flows into the Timor Sea, and as far as the vicinity of about Red Cliff. Emmiyangal tradition places them between Banagaya and Mabulhuk (Cape Ford).

== People ==
The Emmiyangal were once thought to be closely related to the Wogait, Arthur Capell, and Stanner claiming that the two were virtually interchangeable ( "virtually identical.") Their closest linguistic and cultural ties are now known to be with the Menhdheyangal. On the basis of differences in dialect between the two, however, Tindale designated them as an independent tribal reality. Today the majority of Emmiyangal reside either at the government settlement of Belyuen on the Cox Peninsula, with a single family at the Balgal outstation at Anson Bay, and another at Wadeye.

== Alternative names ==
- Ami
- Ame

== Sources ==
- Ford, Lysbeth Julie (1998). A description of the Emmi language of the Northern Territory of Australia (PDF). ANU Phd.
- Grimes, Barbara Dix (2003). "Daly Languages". In Frawley, William (ed.). International Encyclopedia of Linguistics: AAVE-Esperanto. Vol. 1 (2nd ed.). Oxford University Press. pp. 415–416. ISBN 978-0-195-13977-8.
- Marett, Allan; Barwick, Linda; Ford, Lysbeth Julie (2013). For the Sake of a Song: Wangga Songmen and Their Repertories. Sydney University Press. ISBN 978-1-920-89975-2.
- Tindale, Norman Barnett (1974). "Amijangal (NT)". Aboriginal Tribes of Australia: Their Terrain, Environmental Controls, Distribution, Limits, and Proper Names. Australian National University. ISBN 978-0-708-10741-6. Archived from the original on 20 March 2020.
