= Marrithiyal people =

Aboriginal Australian people of the Northern Territory of Australia

The Marrithiyal, also written Marrithiel, are an Aboriginal Australian people whose traditional territory lay 100 to 130 miles (160 to 210 km) south of Darwin from Litchfield National Park and extend to the Daly River in the Northern Territory. They are also known as the Berringen (Berinken, Brinken) people to represent their affiliation and deep connections across the neighbouring South Western Daly region.

== History ==
Their traditional grounds lay south-west of Darwin, in the heart of Litchfield National Park, in an area which is known as Woolaning, Rakula. Like a dozen other tribes, as the white invasion got underway in the 1880s, the local tribes travelled between Litchfield and the Western Daly region with their remnants either dispersed or crammed into smaller outstations. Many Marrithiel, as the tribe spread out into a variety of locations, some shifting to neighbouring lands, others taking up jobs in Darwin, or working as stockmen on their country Mt. Litchfield cattle station, or drifting into the Port Keats mission station.

Strong alliances existed between the Marrithiyal-Marringar cluster, bundled together as a coalition of neighbouring tribes, sharing ceremony, songlines and resources.

W. E. H. Stanner, who described them as a "powerful tribe" in the 1930s, originally spent some 6 weeks among the Marrithiyal in 1932, finding it somewhat difficult to enter into friendly relations with them – troubles with the local police over the killing of a prospector accounting for their diffidence – though he eventually managed to gain their confidence and was allowed to be present and observe two complete circumcision ceremonies.

== Language ==
Marrithiyal is classified as one of the Western Daly Languages Areal group, one of the prefixing non-Pama–Nyungan languages, exhibiting a distinctive phonemic inventory rare among Australian tongues. The Marrithiyal recognize three dialect variants: Marri Ammu, Marridan, and Marrisjabin, and at last count (2006) had an estimated 80 surviving speakers, though slightly earlier the figure had been put at over 100. Most now speak a variety of Kriol. The autonym Marrithiyal has been conjectured to be derived from a combination of the words marri (speech) and thiel, meaning paperbark, reflecting the fact that their homeland was rich in paper-bark forests. It was considered, by both whites and natives in the area, as particularly euphonious, especially compared to the 'rougher' sounding language of the Wagiman further west up river.

== Mythology ==
In the Marrithiyal version of the Dreamtime story of the rainbow serpent, the serpent, lacking a wife, stole one from a flying fox who had two. The latter retaliated by spearing the rainbow serpent who plunged into the water, while the flying fox soared up to the sky. It is one variation on a story which has many different versions in this area.

== Suburb of Darwin ==
The suburb of Brinkin in Darwin is named after this group.

== Sources ==
- Dixon, Robert M. W. (2002). Australian Languages: Their Nature and Development. Vol. 1. Cambridge University Press. ISBN 978-0-521-47378-1.
- Frazer, James George (2000) [First published 1937]. Totemica: A Supplement to Totemism and Exogamy. Collected Works of James G. Frazer. Vol. 7. Psychology Press. ISBN 978-0-700-71338-7.
- Green, Ian (September 1989). Marrithiyel, a language of the Daly River region of Australia's Northern Territory (PDF). ANU PhD.
- Grimes, Barbara Dix (2003). "Daly Languages". In Frawley, William (ed.). International Encyclopedia of Linguistics: AAVE-Esperanto. Vol. 1 (2nd ed.). Oxford University Press. pp. 415–416. ISBN 978-0-195-13977-8.
- Maddock, Kenneth (1978). "Introduction". In Buchler, Ira R.; Maddock, Kenneth (eds.). The Rainbow Serpent: A Chromatic Piece. Walter de Gruyter. pp. 1–22. ISBN 978-3-110-80716-5.
- Stanner, W. E. H. (September 1938). "Notes on the Marithiel Language". Oceania. 9 (1): 101–108. doi:10.1002/j.1834-4461.1938.tb00220.x. JSTOR 40327703.
- Stanner, W. E. H. (2011). The Dreaming and Other Essays. Black. ISBN 978-1-921-87018-7.
- Tindale, Norman (1974). "Marithiel (NT)". Aboriginal Tribes of Australia: Their Terrain, Environmental Controls, Distribution, Limits, and Proper Names. Australian National University.
- Tryon, Darrell T. (1974). Daly family languages. Research School of Pacific Studies, ANU. ISBN 978-0-858-83106-3.
