= Aversive case =

Grammatical case

The aversive or evitative case (abbreviated EVIT) is a grammatical case found in Australian Aboriginal languages that indicates that the marked noun is avoided or feared.

== Usage ==
For example, in Walmajarri:

Yapa-warnti pa-lu tjurtu-karrarla laparnkanja natji-karti.
child-ABS.PL IND-they dust-AVERSIVE {ran away} cave-ALL
The children ran into the cave because of the dust storm.

The suffix -karrarla indicates that the action (running away) was carried out in order to avoid the dust storm, tjurtu-.

The aversive may also be used to mark the object of verbs of fearing. For example, in Djabugay:

Djama-lan ŋawu yarrnga-nj.
snake-AVERSIVE I {be afraid-PAST}
I was afraid of the snake.

The aversive may be used on a nominalized verb, to produce an equivalent of English "lest". For example, "lest they be forgotten" could be encoded as "to avoid forgetting them".

== Languages ==
Few languages have a distinct aversive case. Usually, a single case will be used both for the aversive and other functions.

Languages with a distinct aversive case include:

- Arrernte
- Djabugay
- Gumbaynggir
- Marri Ngarr
- Marrithiyel
- Walmajarri
- Warlmanpa
- Warlpiri
- Warumungu
- the Western Desert Language
- Yidinj
