= Marti Ke language =

Australian Aboriginal language

Mati Ke
- Magati Ke
- Matige
- Native to: Australia
- Region: Wadeye, Northern Territory
- Ethnicity: Mati Ke
- Extinct: by 2016
- Language family: Western Daly: Marringarr; Mati Ke

Language codes
- ISO 639-3: zmg
- Glottolog: mart1254
- AIATSIS: N163
- ELP: Mati Ke

Marti Ke (Magati Ke, Matige, Magadige, Mati Ke, also Magati-ge, Magati Gair) is an Australian Aboriginal language of the Western Daly family. It was spoken by the Mati Ke people. As of 2020, it is included in a language revival project which aims to preserve critically endangered languages.

== Classification ==
Mati Ke is classified as one of the Western Daly languages, bearing close affinities to Marringarr and Marrithiyel.

== Geographic distribution ==
The language was spoken in the Northern Territory, Wadeye, along Timor Sea, coast south from Moyle River estuary to Port Keats, southwest of Darwin.

== Current status ==
In 1983 there were around 30 fluent speakers of the language, and by the early 2000s, 50 people were taught to speak it as a second or third language. The last completely fluent speakers were three people, Johnny Chula, Patrick Nudjulu and his sister Agatha Perdjert, both of whom had moved back to a government-built outstation at Kuy on the shores along the Timor Sea. Though living in close proximity to one another, the two never spoke the language together, since in their social system communication between brother and sister after puberty is forbidden.

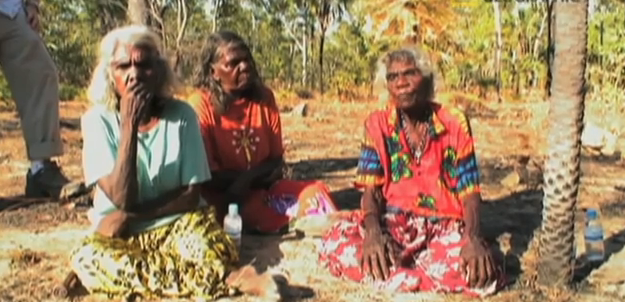
The three Marringarr elders who were the last known native speakers of Magati Ke (2007)

Mati Ke speakers have primarily switched to use of English and the flourishing Aboriginal language Murrinh-Patha. The ethnic population is about 100.

As the language disappeared, linguists worked on collecting information and recording the voices of the remaining speakers.

By 2016, there were no more fluent speakers of Magati Ke.

=== Revival ===
As of 2020, Mati Ke is one of 20 languages prioritised as part of the Priority Languages Support Project, being undertaken by First Languages Australia and funded by the Department of Communications and the Arts. The project aims to "identify and document critically-endangered languages—those languages for which little or no documentation exists, where no recordings have previously been made, but where there are living speakers".

== Morphology ==
=== Nouns ===
Nouns' classification constitutes a core of the language that forms an understanding of the world for its speakers. There are 10 noun classes including: trees, wooden items and long rigid objects; manufactured and natural objects; vegetables; weapons and lightning; places and times; animals; higher beings such as spirits and people, and speech and languages.

Noun class	Classifier
trees, wooden items and long rigid objects	thawurr
higher beings	me
animals	a
manufactured and natural objects	nhannjdji
vegetables	mi

== Vocabulary ==
Marti Ke	English
mi bakulin	billygoat plum
nhanjdiji marri	cycad
a marri	bush cockroach
a wayelh	goanna lizard
a dhan gi	saltwater prawn
