= Marridan =

The Maridan were an indigenous Australian people of the Northern Territory.

== Language ==
Maridan belongs to the Western branch of the Daly River language family

== Country ==
The Maridan's land extended over some 100 square miles (260 km^{2}), inland, along the marshlands north of the middle section of the Moyle River.

== Alternative names ==
- Murindan

== Sources ==
- Falkenberg, Johannes (1962) [First published 1948]. Kin and Totem: Group Relations of Australian Aborigines in the Port Keats District. George Allen & Unwin.
- Stanner, W. E. H. (June 1933a). "The Daly River Tribes: a Report of Field Work in North Australia". Oceania. 3 (4): 377–405. doi:10.1002/j.1834-4461.1933.tb01674.x. JSTOR 40327429.
- Stanner, W. E. H. (December 1933b). "Ceremonial economics of the Mulluk Mulluk and Madngella tribes of the Daly River". Oceania. 4 (2): 156–175. doi:10.1002/j.1834-4461.1933.tb00098.x. JSTOR 40327457.
- Stanner, W. E. H. (December 1933c). "A Note on Djamindjung Kinship and Totemism". Oceania. 6 (4): 441–451. doi:10.1002/j.1834-4461.1936.tb00204.x. JSTOR 40327576.
- Tindale, Norman Barnett (1974). "Maridan (NT)". Aboriginal Tribes of Australia: Their Terrain, Environmental Controls, Distribution, Limits, and Proper Names. Australian National University Press. ISBN 978-0-708-10741-6.
