= Brinkin =

Brinkin may refer to:

- Brinkin, Northern Territory, a suburb of Darwin
- Marrithiyal people, an Aboriginal people of Northern Territory historically referred to by some outsiders as Brinkin
