= Muringura people =

Indigenous Australian people

The Muringura, or Murrinh-Kura, were an indigenous Australian people of the Northern Territory.

== Country ==
According to Norman Tindale's estimate, the Muringura had some 800 sq. miles of territory in the area east of the Macadam Range, and running along the coastal swamps bordering the around at the mouth of the Fitzmaurice River. Their northern borders lay on the Moyle River divide.

== People and language ==
The Muringura spoke a distinct dialect, traces of which remain in the speech of descendants, after their group was assimilated into the larger Murrinh-Patha group.

== Alternative names ==
- Murinkura

== Notes ==
=== References ===
- Falkenberg, Johannes (1962) [First published 1948]. Kin and Totem: Group Relations of Australian Aborigines in the Port Keats District. George Allen & Unwin.
- Stanner, W. E. H. (December 1933). "Ceremonial Economics of the Mulluk Mulluk and Madngella Tribes of the Daly River, North Australia. A Preliminary Paper". Oceania. 4 (2): 156–175. doi:10.1002/j.1834-4461.1933.tb00098.x. JSTOR 40327457.
- Stanner, W. E. H. (June 1934). "Ceremonial Economics of the Mulluk Mulluk and Madngella Tribes of the Daly River, North Australia. A Preliminary paper (continued)". Oceania. 4 (4): 458–471. doi:10.1002/j.1834-4461.1934.tb00122.x. JSTOR 27976164.
- Stanner, W. E. H. (September 1938). "Notes on the Marithiel Language)". Oceania. 9 (9): 101–108. doi:10.1002/j.1834-4461.1938.tb00220.x. JSTOR 40327703.
- Tindale, Norman Barnett (1974). "Muringura (NT)". Aboriginal Tribes of Australia: Their Terrain, Environmental Controls, Distribution, Limits, and Proper Names. Australian National University Press. ISBN 978-0-708-10741-6.
