= Marrithiyel =

Marithiel or Marrithiyal may be,

- Marrithiyal people
- Marrithiyel language
