= Murrinh-Patha =

Aboriginal Australian people

The Murrinh-Patha, or Murinbata, are an Aboriginal Australian people of the Northern Territory.

== Language ==
Murrinh-Patha is spoken by about 2500 people, and serves as a lingua franca for several other ethnic groups, such as the Mati Ke or Maridjabin, whose languages are extinct or threatened. It is not clearly related to other languages.

== Country ==
The Murrinh-Patha's traditional lands extended some 800 square miles (2,100 km^{2}) inland from Wadeye, formerly known as Port Keats reaching eastwards the Macadam Range. Its southern limits lay at Keyling Inlet and the mouth of the Kemoi / Fitzmaurice River (native name Kemol). They expanded southwards in historical times to take over the territory of the Muringura, who were then absorbed into the tribe.

== Social organisation ==
The Murrinh-Patha consisted of 8 groups.

- Nagor

== Religious ceremonies ==
The Murrinh-Patha conducted a bullroarer ceremony, known secretly as Karwadi, and publicly as the Punj. This was analysed by W. E. H. Stanner in terms of a pattern he discerned underlying the more general rite of sacrifice in other cultures, consisting of (a) something of value consecrated to a spiritual being, and whose aim lies beyond the common ends of life; (b) the object of sacrifice undergoes transformation; (c) The object of sacrifice, whose nature has thereby been transformed, is restored to those who made the offering; and (d) and then shared by the community, allowing their loss of the earlier state to be offset by a gain. In the general context of aboriginal religion, such initiations instill the idea that in the Dreamtime, extraordinary events once took place which set the fundamental pattern of man's life in his given environment, and the living must commemorate and keep actively in touch with the symbolic truths and paths outlined illo tempore. Broadly speaking he writes that:

The Karwadi ceremony may be described as a liturgical transaction, within a totemic idiom of symbolism, between men and a spiritual being on whom they conceive themselves to be dependent.

It took from one to two months to complete, and was participated in by members from both patrimoiety groups in neighbouring clans. The young men who are the subject of the Karwadi rite of initiation are candidates who have already been circumcised, but require this last stage of initiation because they are still regarded as refractory to the discipline of full maturity. Karwadi is a secret name for the Mother of All, alternatively known as The Old Woman and the core of the ceremony consists in revealing to them her emblem, the ŋawuru (bullroarer).

After consultation the young men, without compulsion, are taken to a ŋudanu (ceremonial ground) where the fully initiated men (kadu punj) circle them and chant a long refrain which concludes at sundown with the exclamatory of the Mother of All's hidden name, invoked with the cry Karwadi yoi!. All then return to the main camp, with the youths forbidden to speak to both patri- and matrikin, and required to eat alone, as their needs are attended to by adult men.

With the first sighting of the Morning star the initiands are taken back to the ŋudanu, and from that moment they are neither addressed, nor even seen, by anyone who does not belong to the group of adult men overseeing the performance to the end. As they take up the singing once more, men indulge in the comic antics of tjirmumuk, a jostling horseplay between moiety members, including attempts to grab each other's genitals, interleaved with obscene remarks that would normally never be tolerated.

== Alternative names ==
- Murinbada
- Karama (perhaps = 'water folk')
- Garama, Karaman
- Murinkura (apparently a tribe the Murrinh-Patha absorbed, becoming a linguistic group thus designated, the term meaning 'water language.' Tindale regards it as a distinct tribe)
- Nagor
- Nangu
- Mariwada
- Mariwuda

== Sources ==
- Abley, Mark (2005). Spoken Here: Travels Among Threatened Languages. Houghton-Mifflin. ISBN 978-0-618-56583-2.
- Michaels, Walter Benn (2007). The Trouble with Diversity: How We Learned to Love Identity and Ignore Inequality. Macmillan. ISBN 978-1-466-81881-1.
- Stanner, W. E. H. (December 1959). "Aboriginal Religion: I. The Lineaments of Sacrifice". Oceania. 30 (2): 108–127. doi:10.1002/j.1834-4461.1959.tb00214.x. JSTOR 40329195.
- Street, Chester S (1987). The Language and Culture of the Murrinh-Patha. Summer Institute of Linguistics. ISBN 978-0-868-92319-2.
- Tindale, Norman Barnett (1974). "Murinbata (NT)". Aboriginal Tribes of Australia: Their Terrain, Environmental Controls, Distribution, Limits, and Proper Names. Australian National University Press. ISBN 978-0-708-10741-6.
