= Marri Ngarr =

Aboriginal Australian people of the Northern Territory

The Marri Ngarr, also spelt Maringar, Murrinnga, Muringa or Maringa are an Aboriginal people of the Northern Territory.

== Country ==
In Norman Tindale's estimate the Maringar had about 500 square miles (1,300 km^{2}) midway along the Moyle River and its contiguous swamplands and various tributaries.

== Language ==
The language of Maringar Country is Yan-nhaŋu.

== Social organisation ==
The Maringar are composed of six clans: the Bindararr, Ngurruwulu, Walamangu, Gamalangga, Malarra and Gurryindi (Gorryindi) peoples.

Their society was described in a monograph by the Norwegian ethnographer Johannes Falkenberg, based on fieldwork done in 1950, a work judged by Rodney Needham to be 'a masterly monograph which must immediately be ranked with the classics of Australian anthropology'.

== Alternative names ==
- Muringar
- Murrinnga
- Muringa,
- Yaghanin
- Moil

== Sources ==
- Falkenberg, Johannes (1963). Kin and Totem: Group Relations of Australian Aborigines in the Port Keats District. Allen & Unwin.
- Lévi-Strauss, Claude (1963). "Compte-rendu:Johannes Falkenberg, Kin and Totem. Group Relations of Australian Aboriginals in the Port Keats District". L'Homme (3–3): 133–134.
- Needham, Rodney (December 1962). "Reviewed Work: Kin and Totem: Group Relations of Australian Aborigines in the Port Keats District". American Anthropologist. 64 (6): 1316–1318. JSTOR 667861.
- "Crocodile Islands Rangers".
- Tindale, Norman (1974). "Matuntara (NT)". Aboriginal Tribes of Australia: Their Terrain, Environmental Controls, Distribution, Limits, and Proper Names. Australian National University. ISBN 978-0-708-10741-6.
