= Hyland Bay and Moyle Floodplain =

Coordinates: 14°03′22″S 129°52′53″E

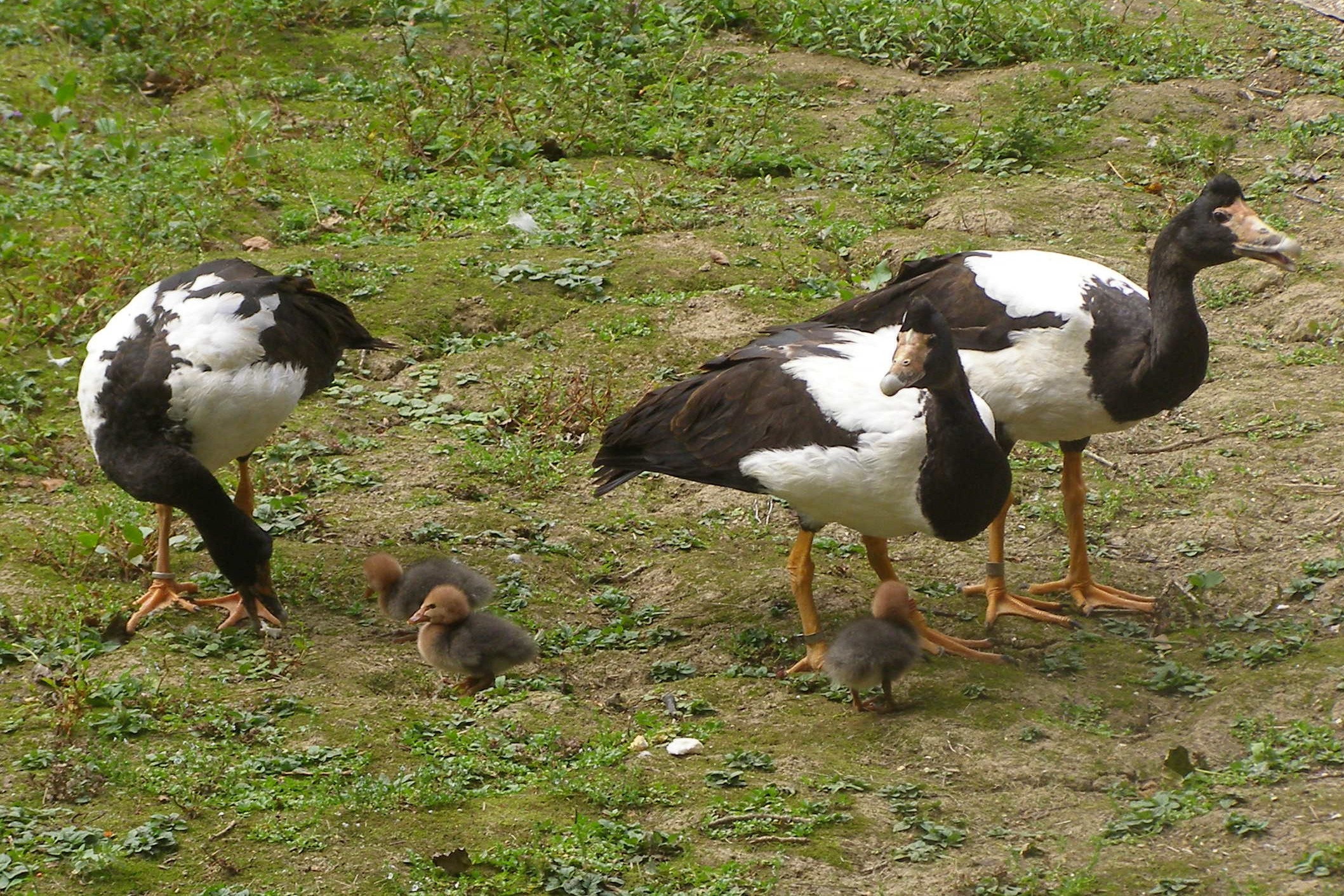
The floodplain is an important site for magpie geese

The Hyland Bay and Moyle Floodplain comprises the floodplain of the lower reaches of the Moyle and Little Moyle Rivers, and the adjoining mudflats of Hyland Bay, on the west coast of the Top End of the Northern Territory of Australia. The site lies about 200 kilometres (124 mi) south-west of Darwin and 30 km (19 mi) north-east of the Aboriginal community of Wadeye. It is an important site for waterbirds.

== Birds ==
The site has been identified as a 1,062 km^{2} (410 sq mi) Important Bird Area (IBA) by BirdLife International because the floodplain supports up to 500,000 magpie geese and over 1% of the world population of pied herons. The intertidal mudflats of the bay support large numbers of waders, or shorebirds, especially great knots. Other waterbirds recorded breeding in the area in relatively large numbers include egrets, little pied cormorants, nankeen night herons and royal spoonbills.
