= Marri Tjevin =

The Maridjabin (Maridan) or Marrisjabin, were an Indigenous Australian people of the Northern Territory.

== Language ==
Marridjabin is a dialect of Marrithiyel, one of the Western Daly languages.

== Country ==
The Maridjabin's territory occupied some 300 square miles (780 km^{2}) predominantly of swampland at mouth of the Moyle River and along the coast near Cape Dombey, and the hinterland for about 20 miles east of that coast.

== Alternative names ==
- Murindjabin (exonym applied to them by the Murrinh-Patha)
- Murintjabin
- Murintjaran

== Sources ==
- Falkenberg, Johannes (1962). Kin and Totem: Group Relations of Australian Aborigines in the Port Keats District. George Allen & Unwin.
- Green, Ian (September 1989). Marrithiyel, a language of the Daly River region of Australia's Northern Territory (PDF). ANU PhD.
- Tindale, Norman Barnett (1974). "Maridan (NT)". Aboriginal Tribes of Australia: Their Terrain, Environmental Controls, Distribution, Limits, and Proper Names. Australian National University Press. ISBN 978-0-708-10741-6.
