= Marimanindji language =

Extinct Australian Aboriginal language

Marimanindji
- Marramaninjsji
- Native to: Australia
- Region: Northern Territory
- Ethnicity: Maramanindji
- Extinct: by 2016
- Language family: Western Daly: Bringen; Marimanindji

Language codes
- ISO 639-3: zmm
- Glottolog: mari1417
- AIATSIS: N16
- ELP: Marimanindji

Marimanindji (Marramanindjdji) is an extinct Australian Aboriginal language of the Daly River region in the Northern Territory. No fluent speakers remained by 2016. The name means 'what language?' and is derived from mara- 'language' and manandjil 'what'. The primary description of Marimanindji is a sketch grammar by Tryon (1974).

== Geographical distribution ==
The traditional territory of the Marimanindji was located south of Hermit Hill. However, the Marimanindji have not lived in this area for a long time. Some of the remaining speakers by 1974 lived along the Daly River and nearby cattle stations, while the others were found in bush camps nearer Darwin.

== Classification ==
Marimanindji is classified as a member of the Western Daly languages, including also Marrithiyel, Marringarr, and their respective dialects.

== History ==
In 1974, no more than 20 speakers of Marimanindji remained.

=== Documentation ===
Prior to Arthur Capell's survey of Australian languages, no documentation of Marimanindji was ever made, and even by the time it was published in 1963, the only material that existed of it included a few notes which he had collected himself "many years" prior to then. A short wordlist and brief description of concord by Darrell Tryon were published in 1968 and 1970 respectively.

== Phonology ==
A tentative phonology of Marimainidji is presented below. Tryon did not consider materials in the language to be capable of a "definitive" phonemic analysis.

=== Consonants ===
A distinction between vocied and voiceless stops was deemed very unlikely by Tryon. /p/ has allophones of [p, b, ɸ, ꞵ]; among languages of the Western Daly group.

| | Bilabial | Dental | Alveolar | Retroflex | Palatal | Dorsal |
|---|---|---|---|---|---|---|
| Stop | p | (t̪) | t | ʈ | tʲ | k |
| Nasal | m | | n | ɳ | nʲ | ŋ |
| Approximant | w | | l | ɭ | j | |
| Rhotic | | | r | ɻ | | |

=== Vowels ===
Marimanindji vowels
| i | u |
| e | a |

== Morphology ==
=== Noun ===
==== Noun class ====
Unmodified nouns in Marimanindji are grouped into five noun classes:

Marimanindji noun classes
| Prefix | Description |
|---|---|
| ∅- | body parts, kinship terms, most natural phenomena |
| a- | birds and animals hunted for flesh |
| mi- | edible vegetables and plants |
| yali- | most wooden implements, some weapons (excluding 'spear') |
| t̪ar- | trees and some wooden implements |

Two other noun class markers are used additionally, wuŋku-, to indicate female animate nouns, and wati- to indicate males, although they are much less common.

Adjectives follow nouns and exhibit concord for the class of the noun; the same noun class prefixes are attached on the adjective.
