= Ami language =

Ami language may refer to:

- Amis language (Taiwan)
- Ame language (Australia)
