= Murrinh-patha language =

Language of northern Australia

Murrinh-patha
- Murrinhpatha
- Region: Wadeye, Northern Territory, Australia
- Ethnicity: Murrinh-Patha, Murrinh-Kura
- Native speakers: 2,081 (2021 census)
- Language family: Southern Daly: Murrinh-patha
- Writing system: Latin

Language codes
- ISO 639-3: mwf
- Glottolog: murr1258
- AIATSIS: N3
- ELP: Murrinh-patha

Murrinh-patha (or Murrinhpatha, literally 'language-good'), called Garama by the Jaminjung, is an Australian Aboriginal language spoken by over 2,000 people, most of whom live in Wadeye in the Northern Territory, where it is the dominant language of the community. It is spoken by the Murrinh-Patha people, as well as several other peoples whose languages are extinct or nearly so, including the Mati Ke and Marri-Djabin. It is believed to be the most widely spoken Australian Aboriginal language not belonging to the Pama-Nyungan language family.

== Names ==
Murrinh-patha can also be spelled Murrinh Patha, Murrinh-Patha, Murinbada, Murinbata, and Garama. Garama is the Jaminjung name for the language and its speakers. Murrinh-patha literally means 'language-good'.

== Dialects ==
There are three similar dialects of the Murrinh-Patha language, namely Murrinhdiminin, Murrinhkura, and Murrinhpatha.

== Status ==
For the Murrinh-Patha speakers, their language is more than a set of rules and a specific grammar. It is very closely tied with or determines for them their land, identity, associations and relation to the surrounding.

Because of its role as the lingua franca in the region, Murrinh-patha is one of the few Australian Aboriginal languages whose number of speakers has increased and whose usage has expanded over the past generation. Unlike many Indigenous languages (particularly those of eastern Australia), children are actively acquiring the language and there is a language dictionary and grammar, and there have been portions of the Bible published in Murrinh-Patha from 1982–1990. This renders Murrinh-patha one of Australia's few Indigenous languages that is not endangered. Additionally, Murrinh-Patha is taught in schools and all locals are encouraged to learn it due to the wide range of use and functions of the language locally.

Murrinh-Patha is the most common language used in day-to-day life by Aboriginal people in Wadeye, and many young people are fluent only in Murrinh-Patha. Aboriginal people who have recently married into Wadeye generally take a few years to acquire the new language. There is a near-total lack of acquisition of Murrinh-Patha by European Australians. Only a few can speak or understand it, and medium-term residents of Wadeye generally learn a few words at most.

Murrinh-Patha is also the main language of Nganmarriyanga, located 50 km away from Wadeye and not in traditionally Murrinh-Patha-speaking territory. It also spoken by some residents of Daly River and of Aboriginal neighborhoods around Darwin.

== Classification ==
Murrinh-Patha was once thought to be a language isolate, based on comparisons of lexical data: at most 11% of its vocabulary is shared with any other language it has been tested against. However, its verbal inflections correspond closely to those of another language, Ngan’gityemerri (Ngan’gi). Green (2003) makes a case that the formal correspondences in core morphological sequences of the finite verbs of the two languages are too similar (in their complexities and their irregularities) to have come about through anything other than shared descent from a common parent language; the two languages make up the Southern Daly language family. Nonetheless, other than having cognates in their finite-verb morphology and in their words for 'thou' (nhinhi and nyinyi) and 'this' (kanhi and kinyi), they have little vocabulary in common, though their grammatical structures are very similar. It is not clear what could explain this discrepancy.

Similarly, although differing in vocabulary, Murrinh-Patha and the moribund Marringarr language share syntax structure.

== Phonology ==
=== Vowels ===
The vowel system is very simple, with four vowels.

Vowels
	Front	Central	Back
Close	i		u
Mid	ɛ		
Open		a	

These vowel phonemes are usually pronounced [ɪ ʊ ə ɐ]. There is no vowel length, and little difference in vowel length between stressed and unstressed syllables, although word-final vowels are often significantly lengthened. Neighboring consonants likely do affect vowel quality, but word position and stress seem not to.

=== Consonants ===
Murrinh-Patha has a "long and flat" array of consonants like most Australian Aboriginal phonologies, with six places of articulation (bilabial, lamino-dental, alveolar, post-alveolar retroflex, palatal and velar), but only a limited range of contrastive manners of articulation. There are oral obstruents and nasal stops at all points of articulation; however there are no phonemic fricatives. The alveolar and retroflex places of articulation are both articulated in an apical way, the dental and palatal consonants are both laminal, and the velar and bilabial consonants form a natural class of peripheral consonants.

The presence of voicing distinctions in Murrinh-Patha is highly unusual among Australian Aboriginal languages, however voicing contrasts are restricted in their distribution.

The consonant table uses the orthography used by researchers, as opposed to the one used most often by the community. The orthography used by the speaker community differs from the research orthography in that the community orthography represents dentals and palatals the same way, both ending with an 'h,' while the research orthography uses 'j' ('y' for nasals) to end palatals and 'h' to end dentals.

The community orthography represents dentals and palatals the same way because they were historically in largely complementary distribution. Dentals typically appear before the back vowels /a, u/, while palatals appear before the front vowels /i, ɛ/, and word-finally. There are, however, many exceptions to that rule in the case of plosives, including many borrowings and the non-borrowed noun classifier /cu/, used for fighting and weapons. On the other hand, in the case of nasals, the only word breaking this distributional rule identified by Mansfield is /pren ɲu/ 'brand new'.

Consonants
		Peripheral		Apical		Laminal	
		Bilabial	Velar	Alveolar	Retroflex	Dental	Palatal
Plosive	voiceless	p	k	t	ʈ ⟨rt⟩	t̪ ⟨th⟩	c ⟨tj⟩
Plosive	voiced	b	g	d	ɖ ⟨rd⟩	d̪ ⟨dh⟩	ɟ ⟨dj⟩
Nasal		m	ŋ ⟨ng⟩	n	ɳ ⟨rn⟩	n̪ ⟨nh⟩	ɲ ⟨ny⟩
Fricative			(ɣ ⟨g⟩)			(ð ⟨dh⟩)	
Liquid	rhotic			r~ɾ ⟨rr⟩	ɻ ⟨r⟩		
Liquid	lateral			l	ɭ ⟨rl⟩		
Semivowel		w					j ⟨y⟩

Voiced sounds /d̪, ɡ/ can commonly be realized as voiced fricative sounds [ð, ɣ].

== Grammar ==
=== Morphology ===
Murrinh-Patha is a head-marking language with a complex verb generally considered to be polysynthetic. The sequencing of morphemes in the verb is highly structured, but the ordering of words in a sentence is largely free.

=== Nouns ===
The Murrinh-Patha language displays extensive classifications both of nouns and verbs. Nouns are divided into ten classes or genders along roughly semantic lines, with some exceptions. Each noun class is associated with particles which must agree with the class.

=== Pronouns ===
In Murrinh-Patha there are four categories which in total make up for 31 pronouns. The categories are: singular, dual, paucal (referring to 3 to 15 individuals) and plural (more than 15). While some of the pronouns stand on their own in the sentence structure, many are embodied in the middle of a verb.

=== Verbs ===
Verbs occur in some 38 different conjugations. Each verb is morphologically complex, with the verb root surrounded by prefixes and suffixes identifying subject, object, tense, and mood; these affixes are different in the different conjugations.

=== Arithmetics ===
Murrinh Patha only has words for numbers up to five.

=== Syntax ===
Murrinh Patha has free word order.

== Examples ==
- kardu 'person'
- nanthi thay 'tree'
- ngarra da ngurran 'I'm going home'
- thangkunuma mi kanhi-yu? 'how much for the food?'
- ku were dirranngingarlbarl 'the dog is barking at me'
- nhinhi, nanku-nitha, nankungitha, nanku, nankuneme, nankungime, nanki 'you'
- ku yagurr 'lizard'

== Writing system ==
Murrinh-patha uses a Latin script. And is written as follows

The Murrinh-Patha Alphabet
Letter	a	b	d	e	g	h	i	k	l	m	n	p	r	t	u	w	y
Phoneme	/a/	/b/	/d/	/ɛ/	/g/	/h/	/i/	/k/	/l/	/m/	/n/	/p/	/ɻ/	/t/	/u/	/w/	/j/
Digraph	awu	ay	ayi	dh	ey	ng	ngk	nh	rd	rl	rn	rr	rt	th	uy	wu	yi
Phoneme	/auu/	/ai/	/aii/	/d̪/	/ei/	/ŋ/	/ŋɡ̊/	/n̪/	/ɖ/	/ɭ/	/ɳ/	/r/	/ʈ/	/t̪/	/ui/	/u/	/i/

== Resources ==
The Dictionary: English/Murrinh-Patha / compiled by Chester S Street with the assistance of Gregory Panpawa Mollingin (1983) is available online.
