= Marri Amu =

The Mariamo or Marri ammu are an indigenous Australian people of the Northern Territory.

== Name ==
The ethnonym Mariamo/Marri Ammu signifies 'plains language'.

== Language ==
Mariamo belongs to the Western branch of the Daly River language family.

== Country ==
The Mariamo tribal lands covered some 100 square miles (260 km^{2}) of swampland south of Mount Greenwood. Their status as an in independent tribe has been maintained by both W. E. H. Stanner and Norman Tindale.

== Sources ==
- Green, Ian (September 1989). Marrithiyel, a language of the Daly River region of Australia's Northern Territory (PDF). ANU PhD.
- Tindale, Norman Barnett (1974). "Mariamo (NT)". Aboriginal Tribes of Australia: Their Terrain, Environmental Controls, Distribution, Limits, and Proper Names. Australian National University Press. ISBN 978-0-708-10741-6.
