= Port Keats Airfield =

- IATA: PKT; ICAO: YPKT

Summary
- Airport type: Public
- Operator: West Daly Regional Council
- Location: Wadeye, Northern Territory
- Elevation AMSL: 112 ft / 34 m
- Coordinates: 14°14′54″S 129°31′42″E

Map
- Location in the Northern Territory

Runways
Direction	Length		Surface
Direction	m	ft	Surface
16/34	1,410	4,626	Asphalt
- Sources: Australian AIP and aerodrome chart

Port Keats Airfield (IATA: PKT, ICAO: YPKT) is an airport at Wadeye, Northern Territory (Port Keats) in Australia.

== World War II ==
During World War II, the airfield was used as an emergency landing ground for Royal Australian Air Force fighters and bombers returning from flying operations over the Netherlands East Indies.

== See also ==
- List of airports in the Northern Territory
