= Johannes Falkenberg =

Norwegian social anthropologist

- Born: April 1, 1911; Oslo, Norway
- Died: June 3, 2004 (aged 93); Oslo, Norway
- Scientific career
- Fields: Social anthropology

Johannes Falkenberg (1 April 1911, in Oslo – 3 June 2004, in Oslo) was a Norwegian social anthropologist.

== Biography ==
Falkenberg was linked to the University of Oslo's ethnographic museum for most of his life; he was a curator in ethnography since 1953, and in 1962 was chief curator. Falkenberg studied at the University of Oslo and took "Geography with ethnographic" under Ole Solberg. He travelled to inner Laksefjord in 1938, where he examined Sami settlements. That resulted in the dissertation "Settlements along the inner Laksefjord in Finnmark" (1941).

As a reserve officer, he was captured in Germany, which, because of another prisoner from the Australian outback, resulted in a fascination with the indigenous people. As a result, Falkenberg decided that he wanted to do research among the natives in Australia. He became a curator at the ethnographic museum at his homecoming in 1945 and wrote the book Et steinalderfolk i vår tid in 1948. Falkenberg then chose the Murinbata people in Port Keats in North Australia for his field research in 1950. This resulted in the publication of the book Kin and Totem. Group Relations of Australian Aborigines in the Port Keats District (Oslo University Press; 1962). The anthropologist Rodney Needham describes this work in a contemporary review for American Anthropologist as an "entirely splendid piece of ethnography, a masterly monograph which must immediately be ranked with the classics of Australian anthropology". Warren Shapiro later calls this book "one of the two best ethnographies...on Aboriginal Australia" of its time. The study was quoted from by Claude Lévi-Strauss.

His later books include The Affinal Relationship System: A New Approach to Kinship and Marriage among the Australian Aborigines at Port Keats (with his wife Aslaug Falkenberg; University of Oslo; 1981). Shapiro notes that the Falkenbergs fall into the tradition of "discursive ethnographers"; he considers this book provides a large amount of data, but criticises their approach as naive and at times "unnecessarily anecdotal and insufficiently formalised".
