= Marranj language =

Australian Aboriginal language

Marranj
- Maranunggu
- Native to: Australia
- Region: Daly River; Northern Territory, Coast along Anson Bay, southwest of Darwin
- Ethnicity: Marranunggu, Emmiyangal, Menthe
- Native speakers: 35 (2007)
- Language family: Western Daly: Marranj
- Dialects: Maranunggu; Menhthe (Manda); Emmi (Ami)

Language codes
- ISO 639-3: Variously: zmr – Maranunggu amy – Ami (Emmi) zma – Manda (Menthe)
- Glottolog: waga1259
- AIATSIS: N215 Marranj
- ELP: Emmi; Manda (Australia)

Marranj is an Australian Aboriginal language, a dialect continuum consisting of Maranunggu (Merranunggu, Marranj Warrgat), Menhthe, and Emmi.

== Phonology ==
=== Consonants ===
	Peripheral		Laminal	Apical	
	Labial	Velar	Palatal	Alveolar	
Plosive	p	k	t̠ʲ	t	
Nasal	m	ŋ	n̠ʲ	n	
Rhotic				r	ɾ
Lateral				l	
Approximant	w		j		

- Voiceless stop sounds /p, t, t̠ʲ, k/ may also fluctuate to voiced sounds [b, d, d̠ʲ, ɡ] when in intervocalic, post-nasal and post-liquid positions.
- /t/ can also freely be realized as a fricative [θ] in word-initial positions, and when heard as [d], it can also be heard as [ð] when after /n/ and in intervocalic positions.
- Sounds /m, n/ can also occur as geminated [mː, nː]

=== Vowels ===
	Front	Central	Back
High	i		u
Mid	æ	ə	u
Low	æ		ɑ

Phoneme	Allophones
/i/	[i], [ɪ], [e], [ɛ]
/æ/	[æ], [ɛ]
/ɑ/	[ɑ], [ʌ]
/u/	[u], [ʊ], [o], [ɔː]
