= Marringarr language =

Aboriginal language spoken in Australia's Northern Territory

Marri Ngarr
- Marrengarr
- Native to: Australia
- Region: Daly River
- Ethnicity: Marringarr
- Native speakers: 5 (2016 census)
- Language family: Western Daly: Marti Ke–Marringarr; Marri Ngarr

Language codes
- ISO 639-3: zmt
- Glottolog: mari1418
- AIATSIS: N102
- ELP: Marringarr
- Maringarr is classified as Critically Endangered by the UNESCO Atlas of the World's Languages in Danger.

The Maringarr language (Marri Ngarr, Marenggar, Maringa) is a moribund Australian Aboriginal language spoken by the Marri Ngarr along the northwest coast of the Northern Territory. Only around ten people speak Marringarr, and it is not spoken daily.

== History ==
In 1935, Wadeye, a Catholic mission, was established in the territory of the Murrinh-Patha. Many other peoples moved to the area as a result, and Murrinh-patha became dominant there. Other traditional languages have ceased intergenerational transmission in favour of Murrinh-patha. As of 1974, only 30 to 40 people spoke Marringarr. By 2023, only 10 people reported themselves to speak the language. Marringarr is no longer in daily use.

=== Documentation ===
Previously, very little had been documented of Marringarr. William Edward Hanley Stanner reported that Oates and Oates had collected a vocabulary of it. A list of 95 words was collected by Darrell Tryon and published in 1968, and a description of noun class and concord published two years later. Around 2003, the Marringarr requested documentation of their language, as they were concerned about the language's endangerment. The only comprehensive grammar of Marringarr is a 2023 doctoral thesis by Katie Bicevskis.

== Geographical distribution ==
Marringarr country is distributed along the floodplains of the Moyle River. The name of the river comes from the Marringarr word moyll 'swamp'. As with many other Daly River peoples, the Marringarr have not lived permanently in their traditional territory for some time. Presently, they reside in Wadeye, Daly River, and cattle stations nearby.

== Phonology ==
=== Consonants ===
		Bilabial	Apical		Laminal		Dorsal
		Bilabial	Alveolar	Retroflex	Dental	Palatal	Dorsal
Stop	voiceless	p	t		t̪	c	k
Stop	voiced	b	d				
Fricative		β		ʐ		ʝ	ɣ
Nasal		m	n			ɲ	ŋ
Lateral			l				
Rhotic			r				
Approximant		w		ɻ		j	

- /p/ may also be heard as a bilabial fricative [ɸ] in intervocalic positions.
- /c/ may also be heard as a fricative [ʒ] in intervocalic positions.
- /r/ may also be heard as a tap [ɾ], and can be realized as [r̥] within the position of voiceless consonants.
- /t, d, l/ are often be realized as retroflex [ʈ, ɖ, ɭ] when following a non-front vowel.
- /t̪/ may also be heard as a fricative [ð] in intervocalic positions.
- /β/ may also be heard as a voiceless [ɸ], in various word-initial positions.

=== Vowels ===
	Front	Central	Back
High	i		u
Mid	ɛ		
Low	ɐ ~ æ		

- Phonemes /i, u/ have lax allophones of [ɪ, ʊ] in word-medial and unstressed positions. They are mainly heard as [i, u] in stressed positions, in word-final positions or following glide sounds.
- /u/ can be realized as [ɔ] when preceded or followed by a peripheral consonant. When preceding a palatal consonant, it is realized as a diphthong [ɔɪ].
- /ɐ/ is often heard as [æ] when following a palatal consonant. When preceding a palatal consonant, it is realized as a diphthong [aɪ].

== Grammar ==
The vocabulary of Marringarr is limited; therefore the relations and positioning of the words matter to make sense of the construction according to the situation. It is a polysynthetic language.

niwinj yi gudingi-derrkurr-fingi-gawunh
3DU that 3DU.SBJ.DI.R.IPFV-sharpen-now-3DU.SBJ.SIT.R
'Those two fellas are sharpening their knives now.'

Marringarr is also ergative; the ergative case is marked by the postposition -ŋarrin.
