= Brinkin, Northern Territory =

Brinkin Darwin, Northern Territory
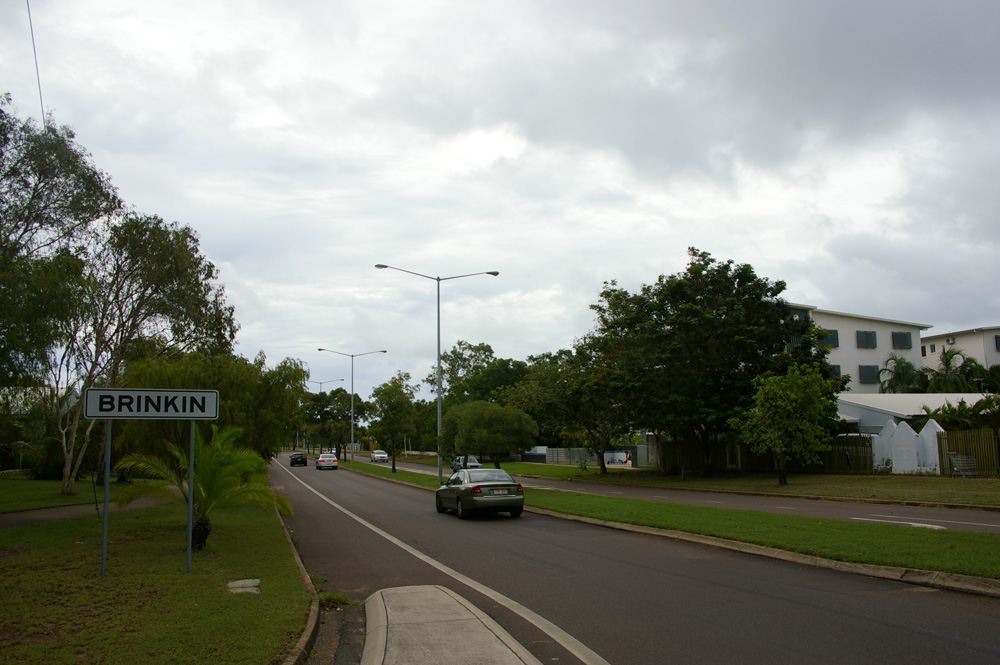

- Coordinates: 12.370°S 130.867°E
- Population: 1,117 (SAL 2021)
- Established: 1984
- Postcode(s): 0810
- Area: 1.4 km^{2} (0.5 sq mi)
- Location: 12 km (7 mi) from Darwin
- LGA(s): City of Darwin
- Territory electorate(s): Casuarina
- Federal division(s): Solomon
Suburbs around Brinkin:
Darwin Harbour	Darwin Harbour	Darwin Harbour; Tiwi
Rapid Creek	Brinkin	Tiwi; Nakara
Rapid Creek	Rapid Creek; Alawa	Nakara; Alawa
- Footnotes: Adjoining suburbs

Brinkin is a northern suburb of Darwin, the capital city of the Northern Territory, Australia. It is located 12 kilometres (7 mi) north of Darwin's central business district, and is home to the Casuarina campus of Charles Darwin University (formerly Northern Territory University's campus). It is the traditional country and waterways of the Larrakia people.

== History ==
Brinkin is named after an Aboriginal people who inhabited an area to the south of the Daly River mouth, the Marrithiyal people, sometimes referred to by other tribes in the past as Brinken. The streets in Brinkin are named after boats which serviced the coast of northern Australia.

The suburb was constructed in 1984, and the university followed several years later.

== Geography ==
Brinkin is located on Darwin Harbour coastline at the southern end of Casuarina Beach, and is bounded by Trower Road to the north, Ellengowen Drive to the east and part of Rapid Creek and a stormwater drain to the south. The suburb consists of a few residential blocks to the north of the university, the university itself, a coastal reserve and part of the Rapid Creek Wetlands.

Ellengowan Drive in Brinkin was named after the SS Ellengowan, the oldest known shipwreck in Darwin harbour.

== Demographics ==
In the 2006 census, Brinkin had a population of 1,040, a median age of 30, and a median individual income of $681 per week, compared with $682 per week in Darwin generally, and $466 nationally. The population of Brinkin was predominantly Australian-born – 63.05% as at the 2006 census – while 4.41% were born in the United Kingdom. Other significant groups include those of Greek (9.2%), Chinese, Italian, Indian and South East Asian descent. 3.4% of residents identified as Indigenous Australians. The main occupations of Brinkin residents are in the public service, education and health. The most popular religious affiliations in descending order in the 2006 census were Roman Catholic, no religion, Anglican, Greek Orthodox and Uniting.

The population of Brinkin grew to 1,129 in the 2011 census and 1,268 in the 2016 census. In the 2021 census there were 1,117 people living in Brinkin.
