= Verb of fearing =

Latin verbs

In Latin grammar, a verb of fearing is one that pertains to fear or concern (often timeo, terreor, metuo, and vereor). This set of verbs is grammatically notable because it inverts the sense of a following purposive clause, at least relative to the intuition of speakers of many non-Latin languages.

== Usage ==
Verbs of fearing can be used in three different ways: fear of a person or thing, fear of performing an action and fear of an event occurring.

- Fear of a person or thing is expressed using a verb of fearing (e.g. timeo) and a noun, either in the dative or the accusative. Mountford notes that there is no general rule on which case should be used, although different meanings can be conveyed depending on use.
  - hostes timet – 'he fears the enemy'.
  - filio timet pater – 'the father fears for his son'.
  - furem pomis timet agricola – 'the farmer fears the thief on account of his apples'.
- Fear of performing an action is expressed using an infinitive, much like in English.
  - timeo hoc facere – 'I am afraid to do this'.
- Fear of an event occurring is expressed using the conjunctions 'ne', conveying that, with regard to the event occurring, the negative is wished and the positive feared, and 'ut', conveying that the positive is wished and the negative feared. These conjunctions are then followed by the subjunctive, according to the sequence of tenses, with primary sequence tenses generally being followed by the present or perfect subjunctives and historic (or secondary) sequence tenses being followed by the imperfect or pluperfect subjunctives.
  - vereor ne hostis veniat – 'I fear lest the enemy come', 'I fear that the enemy is coming'.
  - vereor ne dum minuere velim laborem augeam, Cicero De Legibus I.4.12 – 'I fear that, while I wish to lessen the toil, I am increasing it'.
  - timeo ne tibi nihil praeter lacrimas queam reddere, Cicero Pro Plancio 42.101 – 'I am afraid that I can give nothing in return save tears'.
