= Richard Docherty =

Australian priest (1899–1979)

Richard Docherty (15 May 1899– 1 May 1979) was a Catholic priest who established the Port Keats Catholic Mission, now known as Wadeye in the Northern Territory of Australia.

== Biography ==
In 1899, Docherty was born in Urwin, Western Australia. 28 years later, in 1927, he was ordained as a priest, Missionaries of the Sacred Heart (M.S.C.). A year later, he moved to Darwin and then, in 1935, to Werntek Nganayi (or Werntekngnanyi) where he founded a Catholic Mission; this site is now also known as 'Old Mission'. Here, on 23 June 1935, the community held their first mass.

In 1939, he moved the mission to Wadeye, 14 kilometres (8.7 mi) inland from the original site and he stayed for 19 years, his longest place of residence since being ordained.

In 1958, Docherty moved to the city of Sydney where he stayed for a year before moving to Hammond Island, a small island in the Torres Strait between Australia and Papua New Guinea. He remained here for 9 years, before returning to the town of Darwin in 1968. 4 years later, he moved south to Daly River.

In 1978, he was awarded the Order of Australia, becoming a Member of the Order of Australia.

He died the following year, while visiting Perth, and was buried in Wadeye.
