= Menthe people =

The Menthe, occasionally called Menthajangal (Menhdheyangal), are an indigenous Australian people of the Northern Territory.

== Country ==
The Menthe had approximately 300 square miles (780 km^{2}) of land around the Bonaparte Gulf. Along the coast it ran south from Red Cliff down past Cape Scott. Their hinterland extension had a depth of some 10 miles bordering on the coastal swamps in that area.

== Sources ==
- Ford, Lysbeth Julie (1998). A description of the Emmi language of the Northern Territory of Australia (PDF) (Doctoral thesis). Australian National University.
- Marett, Allan; Barwick, Linda; Ford, Lysbeth Julie (2013). For the Sake of a Song: Wangga Songmen and Their Repertories. Sydney University Press. ISBN 978-1-920-89975-2.
- Tindale, Norman Barnett (1974). "Menthajangal (NT)". Aboriginal Tribes of Australia: Their Terrain, Environmental Controls, Distribution, Limits, and Proper Names. Australian National University.
