= Rodney Needham =

English social anthropologist

Rodney Needham (15 May 1923 – 4 December 2006 in Oxford) was an English social anthropologist.

Born Rodney Phillip Needham Green, he changed his name in 1947; the following year he married Maud Claudia (Ruth) Brysz. The couple would collaborate on several works, including an English translation of Robert Hertz's Death and the Right Hand.

His fieldwork was with the Penan of Borneo (1951-2) and the Siwang of Malaysia (1953-5). His doctoral thesis on the Penan was accepted in 1953. He was University Lecturer in Social Anthropology, Oxford University, 1956–76; Professor of Social Anthropology, Oxford, 1976–90; Official Fellow, Merton College, Oxford, 1971–75; and Fellow, All Souls College, Oxford, 1976-90.

Together with Edmund Leach and Mary Douglas, Needham brought structuralism from France and anglicised it in the process. A prolific scholar, he was also a teacher and a rediscoverer of neglected figures in the history of his discipline, such as Arnold Van Gennep and Robert Hertz.

Among other things, he contributed to the study of family resemblance, introducing the terms "monothetic" and "polythetic" into anthropology.

He had two children, one of whom, Tristan, became a professor of mathematics.

== Bibliography ==
- 1962 Structure and sentiment
- 1971 Rethinking kinship and marriage
- 1972 Belief, language and experience
- 1973 Right and left. Essays on dual symbolic classification
- 1974 Remarks and inventions – Skeptical essays about kinship
- 1975 Polythetic classification: Convergence and consequences
- 1978 Primordial characters
- 1978 Essential perplexities
- 1979 Symbolic classification
- 1980 Reconnaissances, U. of Toronto Press, ISBN 0-8020-2365-7
- 1981 Circumstantial deliveries, Berkeley: University of California Press, ISBN 0-585-28111-4
- 1983 Against the tranquility of axioms
- 1983 Sumba and the slave trade
- 1985 Exemplars, Berkeley: University of California Press, ISBN 0-520-05200-5
- 1987 Counterpoints
- 1987 Mamboru, history and structure in a domain of Northwestern Sumba
