= Fitzmaurice River =

Fitzmaurice
- Location of the Fitzmaurice River mouth in the Northern Territory
- Etymology: Lewis Roper Fitzmaurice

Location
- Country: Australia
- Territory: Northern Territory

Physical characteristics
- Source
  - location: Wombungi, Australia
  - elevation: 181 m (594 ft)
- Mouth
  - location: Joseph Bonaparte Gulf, Australia
  - coordinates: 14°49′29″S 129°50′10″E
  - elevation: 0 m (0 ft)
- Length: 276 km (171 mi)
- Basin size: 10,375 km^{2} (4,006 sq mi)

The Fitzmaurice River is a river in the Northern Territory of Australia.

== Course ==
The river drains into the Joseph Bonaparte Gulf in the Timor Sea from a source just north of the Wombungi homestead. The river flows in a westerly direction between the Wingate mountains to the north and the Yamberra Mountains to the south. The area is quite remote and largely unsettled, and the river itself forms the southern boundary of the township of Wadeye.

The estuary formed at the river mouth is tidal in nature and in near pristine condition.

== Catchment ==
The drainage basin occupies an area of 10,375 square kilometres (4,006 sq mi) and is wedged between the catchment areas for Victoria River to the south and Moyle River to the north. The river has a mean annual outflow of 1,600 gigalitres (2.093×10^{9} cu yd).

== Fauna ==
A total of 16 species of fish are found in the river including the glassfish, Macleay's glassfish, fork-talked catfish, fly-specked hardyhead, mouth almighty, spangled perch, barramundi, oxeye herring, rainbowfish, exquisite rainbowfish, northern trout gudgeon, bony bream, catfish, and the seven-spot archerfish.

A large number of crocodiles—both saltwater and fresh—inhabit the river. Wild cattle and bush pigs can be found in the surrounding countryside.

== History ==
It was first charted in 1839 by European explorers aboard HMS Beagle under the command of John Lort Stokes. It was named after Lewis Roper Fitzmaurice, a mate and assistant surveyor on Beagle.

In 1977, Australian bushman Rodney Ansell was stuck for months on the river, after his boat capsized in the estuary and he ventured upstream for a source of fresh water.

== See also ==
- List of rivers of Australia § Northern Territory
