= Western Daly languages =

Language family of Australia

Kardu Yek Diminin
- Geographic distribution: Daly River region, northern Australia (Thamarrurr Region)
- Linguistic classification: One of the world's primary language families
- Subdivisions: Maranunggu; Marrithiyel; Marri Ngarr

Language codes
- Glottolog: west2434
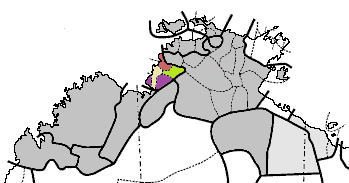
- The Daly languages (color), among the other non-Pama-Nyungan languages (grey)

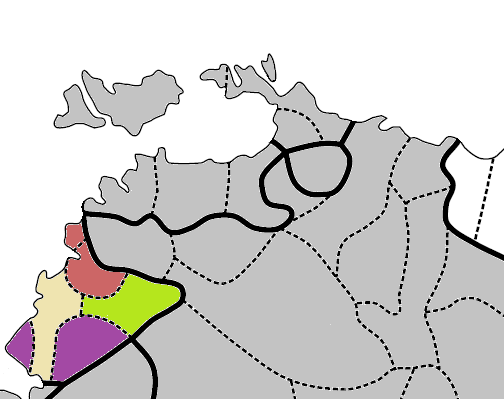
- Western Daly

The Kardu Yek Diminin languages are a small family of Australian aboriginal languages that share common grammatical forms. They are:

- Western Daly
  - Maranunggu (Emmi; Menhthe dialect)
  - Marrithiyel (Bringen: Marri Ammu, Marritjevin, Marridan, Marramanindjdji dialects)
  - Marri Ngarr (Magati-ge dialect)

== Vocabulary ==
The following basic vocabulary items are from Tryon (1968).

no.	gloss	Tangural	Marengar	Nganygit	Marithiel	Maretyabin	Maredan	Manda	Ame	Maranunggu	Maramanandji
1	head	piye	ᵽuŋïdït	piye	piye	piye	piye	piya	piyæ	piya	pœye
2	hair	pimær	mar	pimæR	pimæR	pimɛr	pimær	mæR	mæR	mæR	maR
3	eyes	mïre	mi	mïre	mïre	mïre	mïre	mɔ	mïre	mïre	mïre
4	nose	yæn	yɛn	yæn	yæn	yæn	yæn	yin	yiɳ	yin	yæn
5	ear	čæŋe	taŋe	čæŋe	čæŋe	čæŋe	čæŋe	čæŋe	čæŋe	čæŋe	čaŋe
6	tooth	diyæR	dæR	diyær	diyær	diyær	diyær	diR	diR	diR	dær
7	tongue	ŋalðïreðïre	ŋïnïnïŋ	ŋalðïreðïre	ŋalðïreðïre	ŋalðïreðïre	ŋalðïreðïre	ŋaldïre	ŋaldïre	ŋaldïredïre	ŋalŋɛɲaŋ
8	shoulder	kaRe	kaRe	kaRe	kaRe	tæbæræn	kaRe	mïnmæ	kaRa	kaRa	kaRe
9	elbow	pipæn	pipæn	pipæn	pipæn	pipen	pipæn	pœndœr	pœndur	pœndœr	ᵽipæn
10	hand	punde	punde	punde	punde	punde	mure	neyuŋgɔ	nuŋgɔ	neyuŋgur	mure
11	breasts	yæŋe	yæŋe	yæŋe	yæŋe	yæŋe	yæŋe	yiŋe	yiŋe	yiŋe	yæŋe
12	back	tade	tade	tade	tade	tade	ʈade	tade	dædi	dæde	tade
13	belly	maɖe	maRe	wuyan	maɖe	maɖe	maɖe	mare	mari	dluR	maɖe
14	navel	tædir	čædɛR	tædɛR	tædir	tædir	tædir	tïdiR	tidiR	tɛdɛR	čædir
15	heart	mïrerïm	mïrerïm	mïrerïm	mïrerïm	mïrerïm	mïrerïm	miriǰun	mïrœǰœn	miriǰun	mardečæmbɛr
16	urine	wïǰɛde	wiɖe	wuǰïde	wuyɛde	wïjɛde	wiyeɖe	aǰawa	aǰawa	aǰawa	wirte
17	excrete	wiyæn	wæn	wuyan	wuyan	wuyæn	wuyæn	wun	wun	wun	pænmœr
18	thigh	puwa	ᵽa	lambɔ	puwa	puwa	puwa	lumbɔ	lumbɔ	taR	ᵽa
19	leg	wœraŋ	waŋ	wuraŋ	wuraŋ	wuraŋ	wuraŋ	taR	aRa	aRa	wuraŋ
20	knee	pæŋge	pæŋge	pæŋge	pæŋge	pæŋge	pæŋge	piŋgar	pïŋgaR	pïŋgara	ᵽœræŋge
21	foot	pære	ᵽære	pære	pæRe	pære	pære	kumbu	kumbɔ	kumbu	ᵽære
22	skin	dærepïre	ʈadebe	dærepïre	dærepïre	dærepïre	dærepïri	dærepoyɲ	dæreƀïriɲ	dærepïriɲ	ædædeᵽïre
23	fat	naye	alayiR	laye	anaye	anaye	anaye	rare	ræri	rære	adluŋar
24	blood	wuRkïrïm	wuRkïrïm	wulkïrïm	wulkïrïm	wulkïrïm	wulkïrïm	wulkïrïm	purwur	purwur	wulkïrïm
25	bone	mowa	balkum	mowa	amowa	mowa	mowa	mɔ	mɔ	mɔ	amma
26	man	mære	mamæ	mære	mære	mære	mære	kandɔ	kandœr	kandɔ	maRe
27	woman	mukɔ	mɔmɔ	mukɔ	mukɔ	mukɔ	mukɔ	mukɔ	mukɔ	pægɔ	ᵽæke
28	father	teða	yita	teða	tiða	čeða	tiga	nila	nila	nila	ŋaða
29	mother	kïla	kila	killa	kïdla	kïdla	kidla	agila	ala	ala	ala
30	grandmother	maŋga	maŋga	maŋga	maŋga	maŋga	maŋga	maŋgale	makale	mæŋgale	maŋga
31	policeman	dukŋanan	dukŋanan	dukŋanan	dukŋanan	dukŋanan	dukŋanan	dæR	dæR	dukyaŋana	duknïne
32	spear	čænde	čande	čande	čænde	čænde	čænde	čïnda	čïnda	čïnda	čænde
33	woomera	kalan	kalan	kalan	manbuk	kalan	manbuk	mænbuk	mænbœk	manbuk	purɛnǰɛč
34	boomerang	kuɲïŋïɲ	wïnǰiŋgiɲ	kunǰïŋïɲ	kunǰuŋuɲ	kunǰuŋuɲ	kunǰuŋuɲ	wïɲiŋgïɲ	wiɲiŋgiɲ	wïɲïŋgïɲ	wïɲïŋgïɲ
35	nullanulla	magulpe	yæleðawaR	pæmbæl	magulbe	magulbɔ	magulpe	mïčïwuR	mitiwuR	magulba	magulᵽa
36	hair-belt	pimæR	maR	pimæR	pimæR	pimɛr	pimæR	mæR	kurarɛR	mæR	maR
37	canoe	čaiwɔ	čarɔ	wutïŋge	čalwɔ	wutïŋge	čalwɔ	wutïŋge	wutïŋgi	čalwɔ	čalwɔ
38	axe	malawuR	malawuR	malawuR	malawuR	malawuR	malawuR	malawuR	pïriri	mæmæ	malawuR
39	dilly bag	wuRgïde	wiride	wuRgïde	wuRgïde	wungïde	wungïde	wargade	waRgade	waRgïde	wurgïde
40	fire	čænǰe	čænǰe	čænǰe	čænǰe	čænǰe	čænǰe	yimiɲ	yimiɲ	yimiɲ	čanǰe
41	smoke	taŋgade	wanɛrɛk	čamɔ	čamɔ	čamɔ	čamɔ	čumɔ	čumɔ	čomɔ	čanǰamɔ
42	water	wude	wurde	wude	wude	wude	wude	wuda	wuda	wuda	wurde
43	cloud	wæŋe	wæŋe	wæŋe	wæŋe	wæŋe	wæŋe	pœra	pœræ	wœŋœ	wæŋe
44	rainbow	tædemæl	aʈademær	tædimæl	adademæl	apulipuli	aʈædimæl	taRwæn	dædimæn	pulipuli	čɛrwïn
45	barramundi	amade	amade	čandawure	amade	amade	amade	made	madi	made	æmæde
46	sea	puraŋaŋ	kïčæR	puraŋaŋ	pureŋaŋ	puraŋaŋ	puraŋaŋ	pœRmæ	wutaR	wutaR	wurde nædær
47	river	diyære	wurde punde	pundæǰe	pædær	pædær	pædær	paŋande	pæra	pædær	pædær
48	stone	karɛlla	karala	karella	karɛdla	karɛdla	karella	ŋurin	ŋuRwin	karawala	karawala
49	ground	pïdlak	ᵽœrak	pidlak	pïdlak	pïdlak	pïdlak	mæɳær	mænæR	pïdlam	wæɲir
50	track	tæmæreduk	mure kunduk	pære	nælæn	pære	tæmbæde	ænmæ	ænmæ	æmæ	nælæn
51	dust	pænne	ᵽænne	pæɳe	pænne	pænne	pænne	wuɲir	pœnœ	pœnœ	ᵽænne
52	sun	pande	ᵽande	pande	pande	pande	pande	kæɲmær	kaɲmæR	keyïk	ᵽande
53	moon	pïŋgal	mïrærmïn	pïŋgal	pïŋgal	pïŋgal	pïŋgal	piŋgal	pïŋgal	alamuɲ	ᵽïŋgal
54	star	wïdle	wïdle	wïdle	wïdle	wïdle	wïdle	pænæɲaba	pænænǰibæ	mœrœ	yæwi
55	night	niče	niče	čuwaŋanan	čuwaŋanan	čuwaŋanan	niče	ŋupæl	ŋupæl	ŋupær	niče
56	tomorrow	ničiŋane	ničiŋane	ničiŋane	ničiŋane	ničïŋane	ničiŋane	yaruŋoya	yæruŋoya	yære	ničiŋane
57	today	yæŋe	yæŋe	nïmbene	yæŋe	yæŋe	yæŋe	yaŋɔ	yaŋɔ	kuǰala	yaŋe
58	big	kapïdl	kïdlïŋa	kapïl	kapïdl	kapïl	kapïl	ᵽal	dukanǰiye	puwal	kapïl
59	possum	poyïre	aƀɔ	puyïre	apoyïre	abwiyɛre	abwiyɛre	paraɲ	paraɲ	paɲ	aᵽïri
60	dog	wačæn	wačan	wačan	wæčan	wačæn	wayčan	mičirim	mïčirim	mi	yidïn
61	tail	yære	yære	yare	yære	ayære	yære	yire	yire	yire	yære
62	meat	awɔ	awɔ	awɔ	awɔ	awɔ	awɔ	awa	awa	awa	awɔ
63	snake	akowan	akwan	kabul	amalïka	amalika	amalika	damunu	dæminæ	awamala	æmæle
64	red kangaroo	waǰuwaraŋ	awardewaŋ	pœraŋ	awæǰuwuraŋ	awaduwuraŋ	awaduwuraŋ	manaRk	manaRk	manaRk	ayɛme
65	porcupine	mirïde	amɛrïde	mïrïde	amɛrïde	amɛrïde	æmɛrïde	mobunïŋga	nïminïŋač	mænɛŋɛč	æmɛrïde
66	emu	mučir	amučir	mučir	amučir	amučir	amučir	ŋurǰe	ŋurǰe	ŋurǰe	kumurunǰɛn
67	crow	awak	awak	wak	awak	awak	awak	wak	wak	awawak	amœlkir
68	goanna	mundïŋïr	awoyidl	mundɛŋɛr	ämandeŋɛr	amundeŋir	amundiŋir	ŋaran	ŋaRan	ŋaran	amoyčɛŋɛr
69	blue tongue lizard	wiyære	awære	wiyare	awiyære	awiyære	awiyære	wiri	wiRi	wure	æƀære
70	mosquito	wïnŋadl	aǰimbæk	wïnŋal	awïnŋadl	awïnŋal	awïnŋal	pute	pute	pɔte	aƀuče
71	sugar-bag	čæmæræ	awapïn	čamara	čæmæRæ	čæmæræ	čæmæræ	kogun	kogun	kogun	ᵽiŋgïlǰa
72	camp	nidin	wuye	nidin	nidin	nidin	nidïn	yœya	yœya	wœwæ	yïdlïbe
73	black	čikïm	čikam	čïkïm	čïkïm	čikïm	čikïm	čuŋara	čuŋara	čipmæ	čikïm
74	white	bogam	bogam	pæǰir	bogam	bogam	abogam	bi	bi	kaɲaboy	kïŋïpboy
75	red	čïdïnwïdl	panetiRŋar	wurewure	wurewure	wurewure	kanetïrŋal	wurewure	wurewure	woyčpïn	birkïm
76	one	ŋïnǰe	ŋïnǰe	ŋïnge	ŋïnǰe	ŋïnǰe	ŋïnǰe	ŋande	ŋandi	ŋanðawaɲ	ŋænǰeƀæ
77	two	čičukune	čičuk	čičukune	čičukune	čičukune	čičukune	meyida	meyiǰa	meyïdiɲ	ᵽiɲɛde
78	when?	kumænbæ	kumænbæ	kumænbæ	kumunbæ	kumænbæ	kumænbæya	mœndœnœ	mœndœ	mœndœtɔ	kumïnbæ
79	what?	nïnǰæ	yipæ	anǰa	nïnǰa	ninǰæ	ninǰæ	mændæ	æme	anǰe	mananǰe
80	who?	ŋïnïmbæ	ŋïnïmbæ	ŋïnïmba	ŋïnïmba	ŋïnïmba	yïnïmba	amba	aƀa	aba	kïnïmbæ
81	I	yegɛn	yin	yegɛn	yigɛn	yegɛn	yegɛn	ŋaɲ	ŋæɲ	ŋaɲ	yegɛn
82	you	naɲ	niɲ	naɲ	naɲ	naɲ	naɲ	nina	nina	nina	naɲ
83	he	naŋ	naŋ	naŋǰe	naŋ	naŋ	naŋ	nuŋɔ	nagurin	nanguɲ	naŋ
84	grass	palle	ᵽare	palle	wære	wære	wære	yœrœ	yœrœ	wœrœ	wære
85	vegetable food	miye	miye	miye	miye	miye	miye	miya	miya	meya	meye
86	tree	tawuR	tawuR	tawuR	tawuR	tawuR	tawuR	tæwæR	tawaR	tawaR	θawuR
87	leaf	marir	marir	muliŋe	mulïŋe	mulïŋe	muliŋe	kalgal	kalgal	kalgal	yirɛn
88	pandanus	miɖæn	miɖæn	mïɖan	miɖæn	miɖan	čaŋača	yaRa	yæRa	yæRa	čiŋe
89	ironwood	mawuɲ	čœwe	mawuɲ	mawuɲ	mawuɲ	mawuɲ	mawuɲ	mawuɲ	mawuɲ	mawuɲ
90	ripe	wiyæɲme	wæɲme	woyaɲme	wuyæɲme	woyaɲme	wiyæɲme	wuɲmæ	wuɲmæ	wuɲmɔ	miƀæŋmïr
91	good	kate	kate	kate	kate	kate	kate	nadla	nælæ	nadla	agate
92	bad	wïnǰæne	wïnǰæn	wïnǰæne	wïnǰæne	wïnǰæne	winǰæne	wæǰir	wæǰir	wærɛk	wurak
93	blind	kulluk	mïdle	kulluk	kudlïk	kudlïk	kudlïk	piyamɔ	kulluk	kuluk	mïričara
94	deaf	ŋamama	ambutaŋ	ŋamama	ŋamama	ŋamama	ŋamama	ŋæmæmæ	ŋamæmæ	ŋæmæmæ	ŋamama
95	saliva	čidærwil	wurdenaŋar	čïdalwidl	čidalwïdl	čidalwïl	čidalwïl	diribæl	dirƀæl	diralk	čædalue

== See also ==
- Daly languages
