= Moyle River =

Moyle
- Location of the Moyle River mouth in the Northern Territory

Location
- Country: Australia
- Territory: Northern Territory

Physical characteristics
- Source
  - elevation: 342 m (1,122 ft)
- Mouth: Hyland Bay
  - location: Australia
  - coordinates: 13°58′31″S 129°44′41″E
  - elevation: 0 m (0 ft)
- Length: 133 km (83 mi)
- Basin size: 7,085 km^{2} (2,736 sq mi)
- Discharge
  - average: 20.3 m^{3}/s (720 cu ft/s)

The Moyle River is a river in the Northern Territory, Australia.

== Course ==
The river rises on a plateau area near the Wingate Mountains and flows in a north westerly direction through mostly uninhabited country through a narrow valley then across the Moyle Plain and eventually discharging about 30 kilometres (19 mi) north east of Port Keats into Hyland Bay and then the Timor Sea.

An 801 square kilometres (309 sq mi) floodplain region exists along Hyland Bay formed by the Moyle and Little Moyle River. The area is dominated by seasonally inundated grassland and sedgeland with areas of paperbark swamp. Mangroves are found along the stretches of the river, creeks and channels that are often backed by saline flats. The Anson Bay, Daly and Reynolds River Floodplains, an important bird area, is situated immediately to the north of the site.

Tom Turners Creek is the only tributary to the river.

The estuary formed at the river mouth is in near pristine condition with a tidal delta. The estuary at the river mouth occupies an area of 7.8 hectares (19 acres) of open water. It is river dominated in nature with a wave dominated delta having single channel and is surrounded by an area of 28 hectares (69 acres) covered with mangroves.

== Catchment ==
The catchment occupies an area of 7,085 square kilometres (2,736 sq mi) and is situated between the Daly River catchment to the north, the Fitzmaurice River catchment to the south. It has a mean annual outflow of 640 gigalitres (837,100,000 cu yd),

== Fauna ==
A total of 25 species of fish are found in the river including; the sailfin glassfish, barred grunter, sooty grunter, fly-specked hardyhead, empire gudgeon, northern trout gudgeon, pennyfish, barramundi, oxeye herring, western rainbowfish, black-banded rainbowfish, bony bream, black catfish, short-finned catfish, seven-spot archerfish and the primitive archerfish.

== History ==
The traditional owners of the area are the Maringar, Nanggikorongo and the Magatige peoples. The river was named in the 1930s from a word in the Maringar language meaning 'plain' or 'plain country'.

== See also ==
- List of rivers of Australia § Northern Territory
