= William Edward Hanley Stanner =

Australian anthropologist (1905–1981)

Bill Stanner CMG
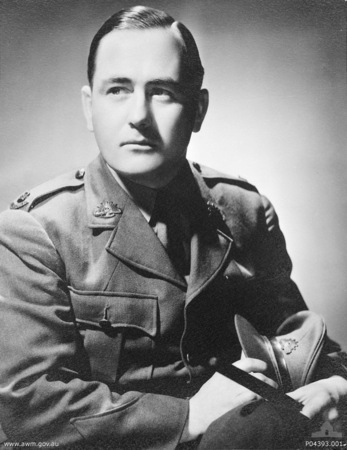
- Studio portrait of VX89030 Major (Maj) William Edward Hanley Stanner, 2/1st North Australia Observer Unit (NAOU), of Watsons Bay, NSW.
- Born: William Edward Hanley Stanner; 25 November 1905; Watsons Bay, Australia
- Died: 8 October 1981 (aged 75); Canberra, Australia
- Education: University of Sydney (BA 1932; MA 1934); University of London (PhD 1938)
- Occupation: Anthropologist
- Spouse: Patricia Ann Williams (−1981)

William Edward Hanley Stanner CMG (24 November 1905 – 8 October 1981), often cited as W.E.H. Stanner, was an Australian anthropologist who worked extensively with Indigenous Australians. Stanner had a varied career that also included journalism in the 1930s, military service in World War II, and political advice on colonial policy in Africa and the South Pacific in the post-war period.

He was the commanding officer of the 2/1st North Australia Observer Unit (NAOU) during World War II, also known as the "Nackeroos" and "Curtin's Cowboys". The NAOU was the military predecessor to the modern Norforce. Formed in March 1942 and disbanded March 1945, they patrolled northern Australia for signs of enemy activity.

Stanner was an influential figure prior to the successful 1967 referendum on Aboriginal affairs which removed provisions in the Australian Constitution which discriminated against Indigenous Australians. In 1967, the Prime Minister Harold Holt invited Stanner to join Herbert Coombs and Barrie Dexter to form the Commonwealth Council for Aboriginal Affairs and advise on national policy. He subsequently played an important role in establishing the Australian Institute of Aboriginal and Torres Strait Islander Studies.

Stanner is known for coining and popularising the term "the Great Australian Silence" in his 1968 Boyer Lectures entitled After the Dreaming, which reflected on the silence on Indigenous Australians in Australian history after European settlement. Stanner profoundly changed the way Australians thought about themselves, their country and Aboriginal culture.

== Biography ==
A number of biographical references exist, the most detailed being by Diane Barwick, Jeremy Beckett and Marie Reay which was largely completed before his death in 1981.

== Early career ==
Stanner was born at Watsons Bay, Sydney on 24 November 1905, the second son of Andrew Edwin Stanner and Mary Catherine Stanner (née Hanley). He was three years old when his father died. He was educated at state schools and won a bursary to Parramatta High School (1919–21), but was unable to stay on after the Intermediate Certificate for financial reasons. Stanner worked for two years in a bank and matriculated by private study. He worked as a journalist while studying at the University of Sydney, initially for the Cumberland Argus. In 1927 Stanner obtained full-time work as a reporter for the Sydney Daily Guardian for Frank Packer, the first of a number of posts in journalism which financed his studies in Australia and England.

At University, Stanner had an interest in athletics, football and was the secretary of the university's League of Nations Society. He stated afterward that his selection of anthropology as a profession was influenced by the famous anthropologist Alfred Radcliffe-Brown. Stanner worked as a journalist until 1932 by which time he was chief sub-editor of the Sunday Sun including several years in the Parliamentary Gallery. Stanner won the Frank Albert Prize in anthropology in two successive years and graduated with a BA (Honours) (Anthropology and Economics) in 1932.

In September 1933, as lecturer in anthropology at University of Sydney, in the midst of the Caledon Bay crisis, Stanner wrote a piece in The Sun in praise of the Minister for the Interior's decision not to send a punitive expedition to punish the murderer of Constable Albert McColl in the Northern Territory.

In 1933 Stanner took up a temporary position on the personal staff of Bertram Stevens, the Premier of New South Wales, for whom he drafted parliamentary and public speeches and prepared reports. At that time he met Herbert Coombs and formed an enduring friendship with William Wentworth with whom he worked in later life.

He earned an MA (Class 1 Honours) in Anthropology in 1934 from the University of Sydney, for which he did extensive field research in the Daly River region of Northern Australia. Adolphus Peter Elkin judged Stanner's 1934 thesis on culture-contact at the Daly River as "a work of outstanding quality". Stanner criticised the popular assumption that the main function of the anthropologist was "the naive search for uncontaminated aboriginal cultures". He presented an exposition of a method for studying contact and cultural change, insisting that this was "an important and neglected problem". Barwick, Beckett and Reay wrote in 1985 that already his lifelong concern with the practical value of anthropology to Aboriginal welfare was apparent. Stanner lectured part-time at Sydney University and was the news editor at the World under Sydney newspaperman George Warnecke.

In 1935, on his second field work, Stanner accompanied the Catholic priest Father Richard Docherty to Port Keats, now known as Wadeye, on the south-western coast of the Northern Territory, halfway between the mouths of the Daly River and Fitzmaurice River. Docherty was commissioned to establish a mission in the region and Stanner helped him choose the site. Over the next thirty years, the people of the two river valleys came into the mission and eventually became permanent residents. On his appointment to the Australian National University, Stanner renewed his interest in the Wadeye area, renewing old friendships. Much of his work as an anthropologist was based on his field work with Indigenous Australians in that area.

Stanner moved to London in 1936, completing his PhD at the London School of Economics in 1938 studying under Bronisław Malinowski. Compatriots included Phyllis Kaberry and Piddington. Jomo Kenyatta, the first Prime Minister (1963–1964) of Kenya and subsequently President (1964–1978) was a fellow student. Stanner's doctoral dissertation was an analysis of economic and ceremonial transactions in the Daly River communities. In London, Stanner also worked as a sub-editor in the Foreign Room at The Times.

Early academic appointments and field research included:

- 1932–36 Department of Anthropology, University of Sydney.
- 1932, 1934–35 Field research in north and central Australia (for the Australian National Research Council).
- 1936–38 Research Assistant, London School of Economics.
- 1937 Personal staff of Commonwealth Treasurer, Lord Casey at the Imperial Conference in London.
- 1938–39 University of Oxford Expedition to Kenya (Oxford Social Sciences Research Committee).

Under the auspices of Oxford University he did field research in Kenya in 1938–39 as part of the Oxford Expedition to Kenya and East Africa for the Oxford Social Studies Research Committee. This field research was discontinued at the outbreak of World War II when Stanner returned to Australia. He obtained employment at the Department of Information and subsequently acted as adviser to successive Ministers for the Army, Percy Spender and Frank Forde who subsequently became prime minister.

== Military service ==
In March 1942, his pre-war experience in northern Australia led to him being directed to "raise and command" to what became the 2/1st North Australia Observer Unit (NAOU), otherwise known as "Stanner's Bush Commandos". At this time he enlisted in the 2nd AIF (1942–1946). Known colloquially as "Nackeroos", the men were deployed in small groups throughout the rugged north of Australia, where they observed and reported on signs of enemy activity, often patrolling on horseback. As the unit's Commander, Major Stanner made contact with many local Aboriginal groups, and employed some to assist his troops as guides and labourers. Nackeroo operations were scaled down as the threat of Japanese invasion passed, and the unit was eventually disbanded in March 1945. The history of the unit was documented in detail by Dr. Amoury Vane.

Promoted to the rank of lieutenant colonel (Lt Col) in 1943, on being appointed as assistant director of DORCA. A developer of post-war colonial policy for DORCA, Stanner presented papers to numerous wartime authorities, and finally was appointed Senior Civil Affairs Officer for the British Borneo Civil Affairs Unit (BBCAU) until the conclusion of the war.

== Career post WW2 ==
He continued his anthropological work after the war, becoming a prominent writer, lecturer and public advocate of the study and appreciation of Aboriginal society and its place in Australia.

Stanner's notable career postings post-World War II included:

- 1946 Department of External Affairs. This was a temporary appointment working with Sir Frederick Eggleston on a proposed South Seas Commission.
- 1946–47 Researcher: Papua-New Guinea, Fiji, West Samoa (Institute of Pacific Relations). This led to the delayed publication in 1953 of his first book South Seas in Transition.
- 1947–49 Foundation Director of the East African Institute of Social Research, Makerere, Uganda.
- 1949–64 Reader in Social Anthropology, Australian National University. Resumed field work in Daly River and Port Keats in the Northern Territory.
- 1953–56 Australian Commissioner, South Pacific Commission.
- 1961 Convenor and chairman, Commonwealth Conference on Aboriginal Studies.
- 1961–62 First Executive Officer, Australian Institute of Aboriginal Studies.
- 1964–70 Professor of Anthropology and Sociology, Australian National University.
- 1967–77 Appointed to Commonwealth Council for Aboriginal Affairs.
- 1971 Emeritus Professor and Honorary Fellow, Department of Anthropology and Sociology, Australian National University.
- 1972–74 Visiting Fellow, Research School of Pacific Studies.
- 1974–75 Special Adviser to the House of Representatives Standing Committee on Aboriginal Affairs.
- 1975–79 Department of Prehistory and Anthropology, Australian National University.
- 1977–79 Consultant to Northern Territory Land Commission.
- 1971–1981 Honorary Fellow, Research School of Pacific and Asian Studies (RSPAS), Australian National University

Stanner also held a number of key leadership positions at the Australian National University including:

- 1954 Chairman of the Governing Body, University House, Australian National University.
- 1954–55 Bursar, University House, Australian National University.
- 1960–1981 Honorary Member, University House, Australian National University.

== Referendum in 1967 ==
Stanner was an influential figure prior to the successful 1967 referendum on Aboriginal affairs which removed provisions in the Australian Constitution which discriminated against Indigenous Australians.

== Council for Aboriginal Affairs ==
In 1967, the Prime Minister Harold Holt invited Stanner to join Herbert Coombs and Barrie Dexter to form the Council for Aboriginal Affairs and advise on national policy. Stanner held that position through successive political regimes, including the Whitlam government, which began to implement much of the program Stanner, Coombs and Dexter endorsed: land rights, the movement to outstations, increased social welfare and community-based economies.

Stanner brought to this policy package an anthropologist's sensitivity to the importance of ceremony and ritual. In particular, at the handover of the first native title grant to the Gurindji people at Wattie Creek in the Northern Territory in 1975, Stanner recommended Prime Minister Gough Whitlam should perform the memorable symbolic act of pouring earth through the hands of Gurindji leader, Vincent Lingiari.

== Boyer Lectures in 1968 ==
In 1968 Stanner presented the Boyer Lectures, which he titled "After the Dreaming". The Boyer Lectures, an annual series of lectures delivered by prominent Australians on Radio National since 1959, have stimulated thought, discussion and debate in Australia on a wide range of subjects. Stanner's lectures, in which he most notably coined the phrase "the great Australian silence" (referring to the erasure from history of the violent colonial encounters with Aboriginal Australians, and Indigenous history in general), have since been reprinted a number of times. The 2019 Boyer Lectures, delivered by filmmaker Rachel Perkins, were entitled "The End of Silence", a direct reference to Stanner's phrase and lectures, 60 years later.

== The Great Australian Silence ==
Stanner was most famous for coining the term "the Great Australian Silence" in his 1968 Boyer Lecture. Stanner stated that there was a "cult of disremembering" which had reduced Aboriginal and Torres Strait Islander people to little more than a "melancholy footnote" in Australia's history. He frequently spoke and wrote about the erasure from history of the violent colonial encounters "invasion, massacres, ethnic cleansing and resistance" between European settlers and the Indigenous population meant that there was "a cult of forgetfulness practised on a national scale". Stanner's Boyer Lectures in 1968 called historians to ensure this pervasive forgetfulness of the Indigenous population ceased, a process that Beasley notes was already under way to a small degree when the lectures were delivered. Beasley has stated that "Ultimately Indigenous Australians moved from being a ‘melancholy footnote’ in Australian history, to occupying a central place in the historiography."

== Family ==
Stanner married Patricia Williams (1 March 1931 – 17 May 2019), a diplomat who resigned on marriage due to the marriage bar, in 1962. The couple had two sons: Andrew Stanner and John Stanner.

== ANU Conference in 2005 ==
In 2005, the Australian National University commemorated the centenary of the birth of Stanner, one of its late professors of anthropology, with a conference discussing his lifetime achievements. Keith Windschuttle described this in Quadrant magazine as "an uncommon honour for an Australian academic who died 24 years earlier in 1981."

Speakers at the conference were as follows:

- Professor Jon Altman, Professor and Director of the Centre for Aboriginal Economic Policy Research, ANU
- Emeritus Associate Professor Jeremy Beckett, Honorary Research Associate, Sydney University
- Max Charlesworth, Emeritus Professor, Deakin University
- Professor Ann Curthoys, School of Social Sciences, the ANU, Manning Clark Professor of History at ANU
- Mark Crocombe, Kanamkek—Yile Ngala Museum, Wadeye
- Barry Dexter, Member of the Council for Aboriginal Affairs, Diplomat
- Professor Mick Dodson AM, National Centre for Indigenous Studies, the ANU and Australian Institute of Aboriginal and Torres Strait Islander Studies
- Alberto Furlan, PhD in anthropology (University of Sydney).
- Geoffrey Gray, Australian Institute of Aboriginal and Torres Strait Islander Studies
- Melinda Hinkson, School of Archaeology & Anthropology, the ANU
- Bill Ivory, Charles Darwin University
- Ian Keen, School of Archaeology & Anthropology, the ANU
- Professor Marcia Langton A.M., B.A. (Hons) ANU, PhD, Macq., F.A.S.S.A., Centre for Australian Indigenous Studies, University of Melbourne
- Professor Howard Morphy, Centre for Cross-Cultural Research, the ANU
- Emeritus Professor John Mulvaney, Emeritus Professor of Pre-History, the ANU
- David Nash, Honorary Visiting Fellow, ANU and Australian Institute of Aboriginal and Torres Strait Islander Studies
- Professor Nicolas Peterson, School of Archaeology & Anthropology, the ANU
- Professor Peter Sutton, ARC Professorial Research Fellow, University of Adelaide
- John Taylor, Centre for Aboriginal Economic Policy Research, the ANU
- Graeme Ward, Australian Institute of Aboriginal and Torres Strait Islander Studies
- Nancy Williams, Honorary Reader in Anthropology, University of Queensland

A volume of the conference papers was published in 2008, An Appreciation of Difference: W. E. H. Stanner and Aboriginal Australia, edited by Melinda Hinkson and Jeremy Beckett.

== Books and publications ==
Books, publications and speeches:

- 1945, Random Reflections During War
- 1953, South Seas in Transition
- 1960, On Aboriginal Religion
- 1967, Industrial Justice in the Never-Never, the Presidential Address delivered to the Canberra Sociology Society, 24 March 1966
- 1968, After the Dreaming
- 1975, Australian Aboriginal Mythology: Essays in Honour of W. E. H. Stanner
- 1979, White Man Got No Dreaming: Essays 1938–1973
- 1985, Metaphors of Interpretation: Essays in Honour of W.E.H. Stanner
- 2001, People from the Dawn: Religion, Homeland, and Privacy in Australian Aboriginal Culture
- 2005, W. E. H. Stanner: Anthropologist and Public Intellectual
- 2008, An Appreciation of Difference: WEH Stanner, Aboriginal Australia and Anthropology

== Honours and tributes ==
Honours, named in honour of, or tributes to W.E.H. Stanner:

- Bestowed with the title "Emeritus Professor" by the ANU Congregation on 1 April 1971
- Mueller Medal awarded by the Australian and New Zealand Association for the Advancement of Science (ANZAAS) in 1971.
- Sir Raphael Cilento Medallist in 1971, established in 1935 by the Australian Institute of Anatomy. Donated by Sir Raphael Cilento, a prominent Queensland medical man. Awarded biennially to the scientist who has advanced native welfare or advanced tropical medicine in Australia or the Pacific area.
- Honorary Doctorate of Literature, Australian National University in 1972
- Made Companion of the Order of St Michael and St George (CMG) in 1972
- Honoured in the list of the "200 Australians who have contributed most to making Australia what it is today", the book published by the Australian Bicentennial Authority as part of the Australian Bicentenary celebrations in 1988.
- The Stanner Award, established in AIATSIS in 1985 "in recognition of the significant contribution of the late Emeritus Professor W.E.H. (Bill) Stanner to the establishment and development of the Institute".
- The WEH Stanner Building at the Australian National University
- The Stanner Room at University House at the Australian National University
- Stanner Circuit (under construction) at Bonner, Australian Capital Territory in Canberra
- The Stanner Club in Darwin, formerly the Norforce soldiers club, since renamed.
