= Marrithiyel language =

Endangered Aboriginal language spoken in Australia's Northern Territory

Marrithiyel
- Berringen
- Native to: Australia
- Region: Daly River
- Ethnicity: Marrithiyal people, Maridan, Mariamo, Maridjabin, Marijedi
- Native speakers: 15 (2016 census)
- Language family: Western Daly: Marrithiyel
- Dialects: Marri Ammu; Marritjevin; Marridan; Marramanindjdji; Marrithiyel

Language codes
- ISO 639-3: Variously: mfr – Marrithiyel xru – Marriammu zmj – Maridjabin zmd – Maridan zmy – Mariyedi
- Glottolog: mari1420
- AIATSIS: N7
- ELP: Marrithiyel
- Marriammu
- Maridjabin
- Maridan
- Mariyedi
- Marrithiyel is classified as Critically Endangered by the UNESCO Atlas of the World's Languages in Danger.

Marrithiyel (Marithiel, also Maridhiel, Maridhiyel), also known as Berringen (Bringen, Brinken), is an Australian Aboriginal language spoken by the Marrithiyal people.

Dialects besides Marrithiyel proper are Nganygit, Marri Amu (Marriammu, Mare-Ammu), Maridjabin (Maredyerbin, Maretyabin, Maridyerbin, Maritjabin), Marridan (Meradan), and Mariyedi.

The Marri Amu dialect is part of a language revival project to save critically endangered languages. As of 2020, Marri Amu is one of 20 languages prioritised as part of the Priority Languages Support Project, being undertaken by First Languages Australia and funded by the Department of Communications and the Arts. The project aims to "identify and document critically-endangered languages — those languages for which little or no documentation exists, where no recordings have previously been made, but where there are living speakers".

== Phonology ==
The following data is sourced from Green (1981).

=== Consonants ===
		Peripheral		Coronal	
		Labial	Velar	Apical	Laminal
Nasal		m ⟨m⟩	ŋ ⟨ng⟩	n ⟨n⟩	ɲ ⟨ny⟩
Plosive		p ⟨p⟩	k ⟨k⟩	t ⟨t⟩	c ⟨ty⟩
Fricative				ʂ ⟨ṣ⟩	θ ⟨th⟩
Trill				r ⟨rr⟩	
Approximant	median	w ⟨w⟩		ɹ̠ ⟨r⟩	j ⟨y⟩
Approximant	lateral			l ⟨l⟩	

- The plosives are unreleased [p̚, k̚, t̚, c̚] word-finally and pre-consonantally.
- All obstruents are voiced [b, g, d, ɟ, ʐ, ð] after nasals, and all tend to be voiced when intervocalic and non morpheme-final; they are voiceless elsewhere and voicing is not contrastive.
- /p, c/ have plosive and fricative allophones in free variation in morpheme-initial and non morpheme-final intervocalic position. The fricative allophone of /p/ is labiodental [f].
- Marrithiyel is unusual among Aboriginal Australian languages in having phonemic fricatives.
  - /θ/ is dental and may be realized as a plosive [t̪].
  - /ʂ/ is retroflex and occurs only intervocalically and morpheme-initially; it is therefore always voiced. It may be realized as a fricative [ʐ], affricate [ɖʐ] or plosive with trilled release [ɖɽ].
- /r/ is realized as an alveolar trill [r] or tap [ɾ] intervocalically, and elsewhere as a trill only.
- /ɳ ʈ ɭ/ recorded by Tryon (1974) correspond to /n ʂ l/ in Green (1981).

=== Vowels ===
	Front	Back
Close	i ⟨i⟩	u ⟨u⟩
Open-mid	ɛ ⟨e⟩	
Open		a ⟨a⟩

- Vowel length is not contrastive.
- Tryon (1974) describes open-mid central /ɜ/, but Green (1981) finds no synchronic or historic evidence for a vowel phoneme in that position, and it correspongs to /i u/ in his data.
- /i u/ are realized as [i u] word-finally and before /j w/ and as near-close [ɪ, ʊ] elsewhere.
  - /u/ is frequently realized as [ɔ] only in /awu/ 'meat'.
- /a/ has four main allophones:
  - Unstressed word-final /a/ tends to be realized as near-open central [ɐ];
  - [æ] after laminals and before morpheme-internal clusters containing a laminal consonant;
  - The diphthong [æj] before morpheme-final /ɲ, c/ and intervocalic /c/;
  - [ɑ] occurs elsewhere, except in the particle /kak/ where it is rounded [ɒ].
