= Wadeye =

- Town
- Coordinates: 14°14′20″S 129°31′19″E
- Country: Australia
- State: Northern Territory
- LGA: West Daly Region
- Location: 394 km (245 mi) from Darwin

Government
  - Territory electorate: Daly
  - Federal division: Lingiari
- Elevation: 11 m (36 ft)

Population
  - Total: 1,924 (2021 census)
- Postcode: 0822
- Mean max temp: 32.4 °C (90.3 °F)
- Mean min temp: 20.5 °C (68.9 °F)
- Annual rainfall: 1,260.3 mm (49.62 in)

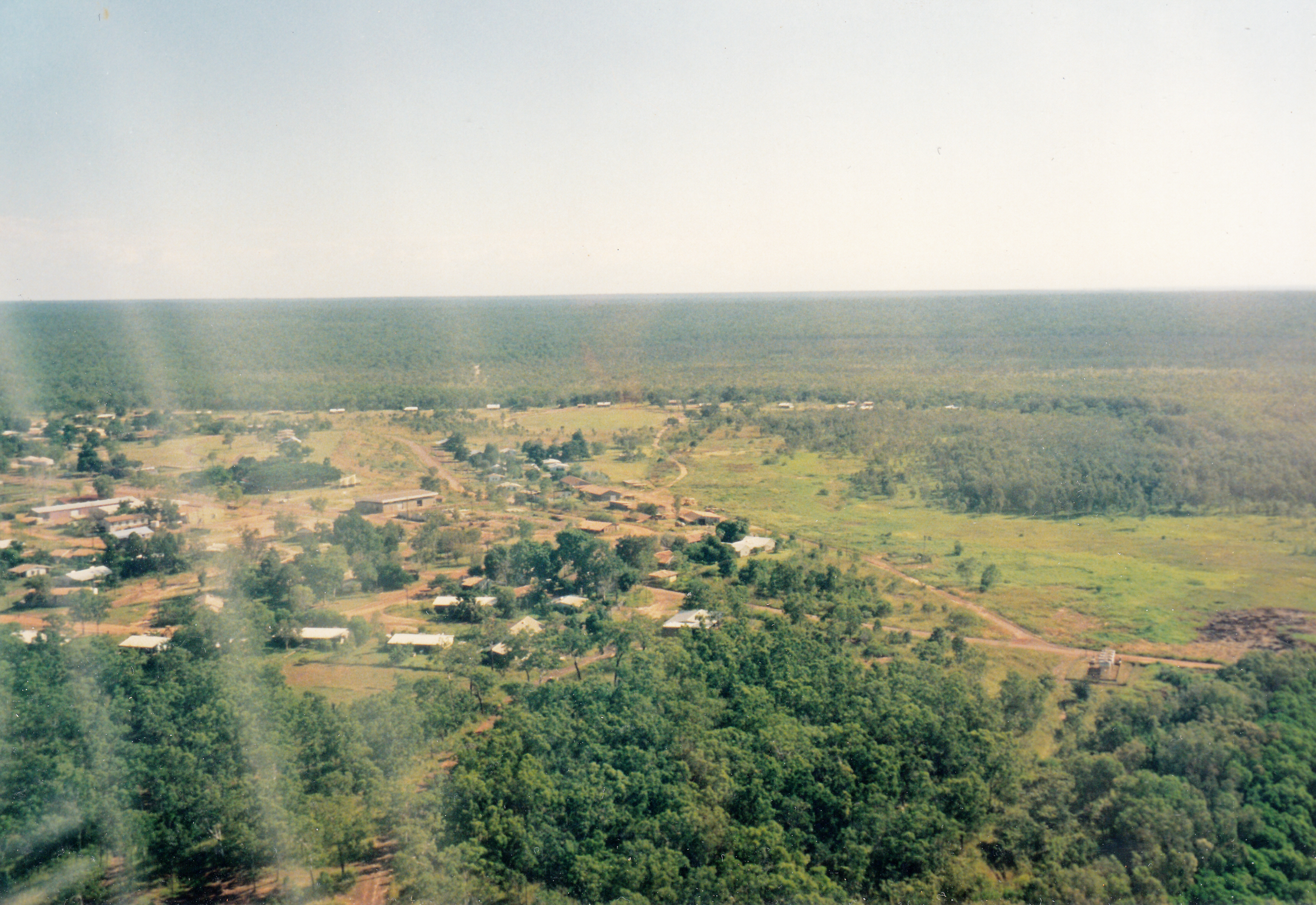
Wadey 1994

Wadeye (/ˈwɒdeɪə, ˈwɒdɛər/ WOD-ay-ə, WOD-air) is a town in Australia's Northern Territory (NT). It was formerly known (and is still often referred to) as Port Keats, a name originating from Port Keats Mission, which operated from 1935 (originally at a different location, known as Wertnek Nganayi) until 1978. In the last few years, Port Keats was run as an Aboriginal reserve by the Northern Territory Government, before being renamed Wadeye when control was passed to the Kardu Numida Council.

At the 2021 census, Wadeye had a population of 1924. Wadeye is one of the biggest Indigenous communities in the NT.

== History ==
=== Port Keats Mission ===
The township was originally founded as a Roman Catholic mission station by Father Richard Docherty in 1935 at Werntek Nganayi (Old Mission), located between the Daly and Fitzmaurice Rivers. In 1938 it moved 14 km (8.7 mi) inland to the community's present location, owing to lack of water supply. Dormitories were established, in which Aboriginal boys and girls between the ages of 5 and 17 lived, away from their families and culture, along with a school. The Daughters of Our Lady of the Sacred Heart looked after the girls, and the Missionaries of the Sacred Heart the boys. Apart from accommodation and education, the missionaries also provided medical care and religious instruction. The school was closed between 1941 and 1946 due to the Second World War.

A report on the mission written by a government inspector in 1951 included the following statement on mission policy, which had been provided to him by the superintendent.

1. To obtain control of and train the children through dormitories.
2. When the children are baptised to purchase the complete marriage rights of the girls and boys from the parents and guardians.
3. To christianise the children.
4. To raise the standard of living of the people through the development of agricultural and stock activities.

The mission dormitories at Port Keats Mission later operated as a residential school, until 1975. In the 1970s, the Northern Territory Government took over control, operating as an Aboriginal reserve, before it was passed to the Kardu Numida Council in 1978, when the community's name was changed to Wadeye.

=== 2022 riots ===
In April 2022, ongoing disputes among family groups flared into mass unrest. Violence escalated between the 22 family groups over the incident, resulting in around 37 homes being extensively damaged by fire in arson attacks, and 125 of Wadeye's 288 properties needing repairs, according to the Northern Territory Government. Hundreds of residents were forced from their homes. On 19 April, a 33-year-old man died in hospital, after he had been allegedly attacked by an 18-year-old man. The teen was charged with manslaughter. The victim's death was caused by a metal bar that had pierced his skull, causing a brain bleed. In May 2023 the teen, now 19, was sentenced by the Northern Territory Supreme Court to seven years' prison for manslaughter. He had been one of the first high-school graduates in over 10 years in Wadeye, and was emerging as a leader.

After the violence, many of the residents fled the area and resettled elsewhere, with some camping in the bush and some moving to Darwin. However leaders started working on peacekeeping initiatives, and a year later, over 150 men and women gathered for a traditional initiation ceremony for young men. Traditional owners, assisted by Northern Territory Police, are working on re-establishing peace and making Wadeye a place where young people can live safely, after houses had been rebuilt.

== Demographics ==
The population has fluctuated around 2000 people in the past, before the 2022 riots. In the 2016 census, 2280 residents were counted. In 2021, there were 1,924 people (408 families). Wadeye is one of the biggest Indigenous communities in the NT.

The people are drawn from seven language groups, with the main language spoken being Murrinh-patha. Other languages include Marri-Ngarr, Marri-Tjavin, Magata-ge, and Djamindjung.

== Location and access ==
The town is remote, situated on the western edge of the Daly River Reserve about 230 kilometres (140 mi) by air south-west of Darwin. The Fitzmaurice River more or less forms its southern boundary.

It lies close to the Hyland Bay and Moyle Floodplain Important Bird Area, identified as such by BirdLife International because of its importance for large numbers of waterbirds.

Wadeye has a sealed airstrip, Port Keats Airfield, with regular passenger flights to Darwin. Road access is mostly unsealed via the Port Keats/ Daly River Road. Wadeye is accessible by road only during the dry season; in the wet season many river crossings are impassable, with access being possible only by light aircraft or coastal barge.

== Facilities ==
Wadeye is serviced by several organisations including government and non-government organisations. There is a Catholic school operated by Our Lady of the Sacred Heart that provides education to students from transition through to year 12. In 2020, despite the COVID-19 pandemic, seven students completed high school in Wadeye. It was the first time since 2007 that anyone had completed the final year.

There is a clinic operated by the Northern Territory Government that provides primary health care and emergency care services for the community. Clients requiring care that is not able to be managed in the community are transferred to Royal Darwin Hospital via the Top End Medical Retrieval Service operated by CareFlight.

The development corporation for the community is Thammarurr Development Corporation (TDC), which represents the local 21 clan groups, providing funding, governance and leadership around issues surrounding community development related to health, housing, education and country.

There is a well stocked shop and a take-away operated by the TDC.

Wadeye is also the site of a temporary ADF Radar site that is used during exercises conducted in the Top End.

In November 2023, the town's swimming pool reopened after being closed for five years. Residents see the reopening as a positive for the town, with the pool providing a safer place to swim than nearby creeks inhabited by crocodiles.

== Art and culture ==
Nym Bunduk was the first painter in Wadeye who had international interest. He was asked by Bill Stanner, an anthropologist who had come with Richard Docherty in 1935, to produce pieces explaining traditional law, which he made after he saw a map produced by Stanner. He produced many bark paintings of the dreaming which informed Stanner's research. In the 1958 George Chaloupka commissioned 64 paintings by local artists including Nym Bunduk, Charlie Mardigan and Charlie Brinken. By the 1960s the Catholic Mission was buying artworks from local artists at the mission store. Bark painting soon became a small mission-run cottage industry.

Following in the tradition of Nym Bundak is Richard 'Skunky' Parmbuk.

== Climate ==
As any other regions in the Top End, Wadeye has a tropical savanna climate (Aw) with distinct wet and dry seasons. The dry season normally occurs from about May to October. The temperature of the dry season can drop below 10 °C (50 °F) during the coolest months between May and August, and it can peak above 40 °C (104 °F) in the build up months between September and November. The wet season is generally associated with monsoon rains and tropical cyclones. Most of the rainfall occurs from December to March (southern hemisphere summer), when thunderstorms are not very uncommon and afternoon relative humidity averages over 70 percent during the wettest months.

Climate data for Wadeye Airport, Northern Territory, Australia (1997-present normals and extremes)
Month	Jan	Feb	Mar	Apr	May	Jun	Jul	Aug	Sep	Oct	Nov	Dec	Year
Record high °C (°F)	38.9 (102.0)	37.8 (100.0)	38.3 (100.9)	38.0 (100.4)	37.4 (99.3)	35.3 (95.5)	35.6 (96.1)	37.5 (99.5)	41.1 (106.0)	41.0 (105.8)	40.6 (105.1)	38.9 (102.0)	41.1 (106.0)
Mean daily maximum °C (°F)	32.5 (90.5)	32.7 (90.9)	33.5 (92.3)	34.3 (93.7)	33.0 (91.4)	31.2 (88.2)	31.4 (88.5)	32.2 (90.0)	33.6 (92.5)	34.5 (94.1)	34.6 (94.3)	33.8 (92.8)	33.1 (91.6)
Daily mean °C (°F)	28.8 (83.8)	28.8 (83.8)	29.0 (84.2)	28.5 (83.3)	26.2 (79.2)	24.2 (75.6)	24.2 (75.6)	24.8 (76.6)	27.3 (81.1)	29.3 (84.7)	30.0 (86.0)	29.6 (85.3)	27.6 (81.6)
Mean daily minimum °C (°F)	25.1 (77.2)	24.8 (76.6)	24.4 (75.9)	22.6 (72.7)	19.5 (67.1)	17.4 (63.3)	16.9 (62.4)	17.6 (63.7)	21.1 (70.0)	24.2 (75.6)	25.4 (77.7)	25.5 (77.9)	22.0 (71.7)
Record low °C (°F)	21.0 (69.8)	19.8 (67.6)	17.0 (62.6)	13.8 (56.8)	10.0 (50.0)	8.2 (46.8)	8.5 (47.3)	10.0 (50.0)	12.0 (53.6)	14.6 (58.3)	19.0 (66.2)	21.2 (70.2)	8.2 (46.8)
Average rainfall mm (inches)	376.3 (14.81)	308.4 (12.14)	205.1 (8.07)	80.1 (3.15)	16.4 (0.65)	3.4 (0.13)	1.3 (0.05)	0.6 (0.02)	8.3 (0.33)	42.6 (1.68)	86.8 (3.42)	202.5 (7.97)	1,331.8 (52.42)
Average rainy days (≥ 1 mm)	14.2	14.0	12.9	5.5	1.5	0.3	0.2	0.1	0.7	3.4	6.2	10.6	69.6
Average relative humidity (%)	70	69	63	45	36	31	30	36	45	51	57	64	50
Average dew point °C (°F)	24.3 (75.7)	24.3 (75.7)	23.1 (73.6)	18.6 (65.5)	13.5 (56.3)	9.8 (49.6)	9.4 (48.9)	12.1 (53.8)	17.2 (63.0)	20.1 (68.2)	22.7 (72.9)	23.9 (75.0)	18.3 (64.9)
Source: Australian Bureau of Meteorology
