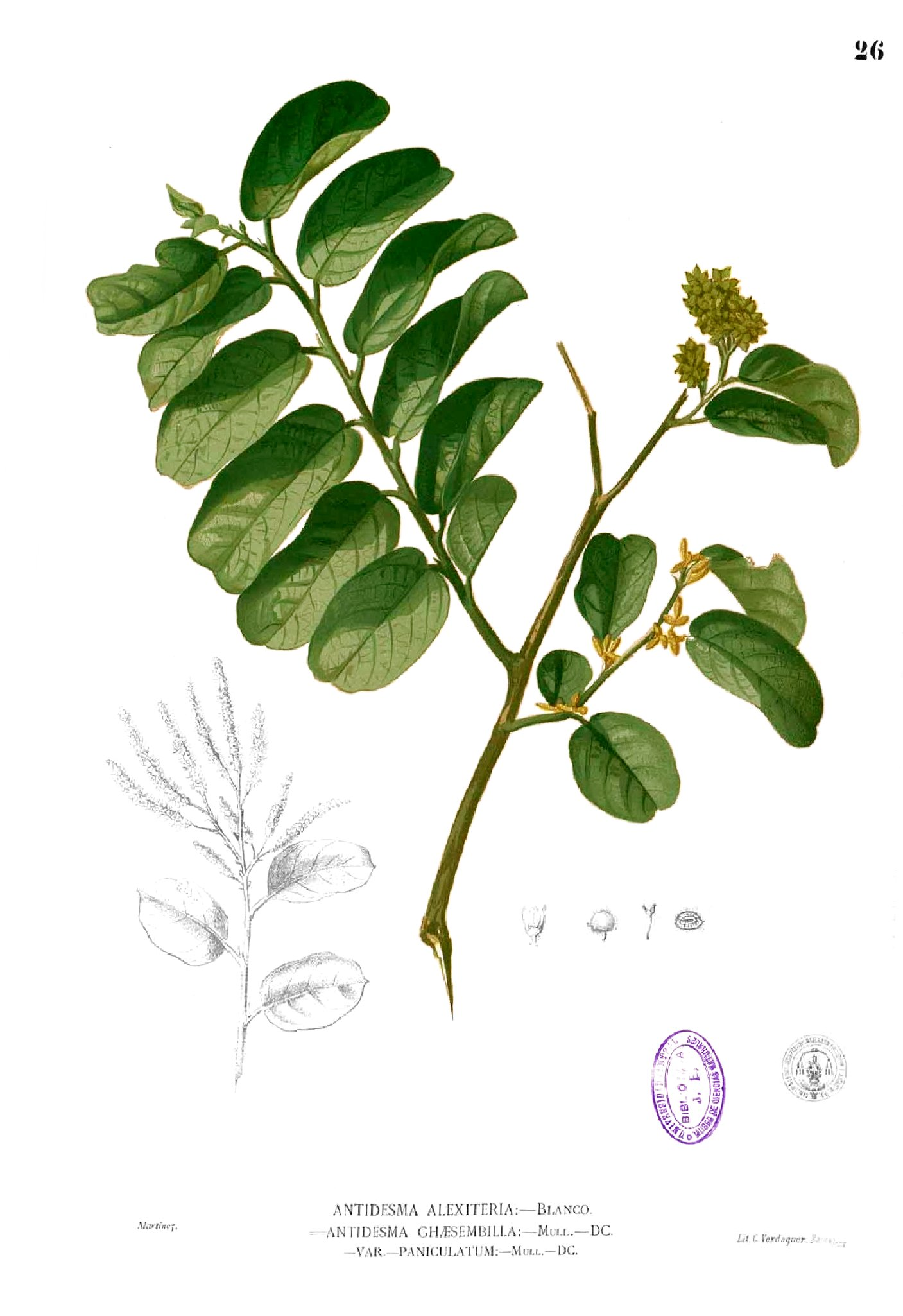

Conservation status
- Least Concern (IUCN 3.1)

Scientific classification
- Kingdom: Plantae
- Clade: Tracheophytes
- Clade: Angiosperms
- Clade: Eudicots
- Clade: Rosids
- Order: Malpighiales
- Family: Phyllanthaceae
- Genus: Antidesma
- Species: A. ghaesembilla

Binomial name
- Antidesma ghaesembilla Gaertn.

Synonyms
- Cansjera grossularioides Blanco; Cansjera rheedei Blanco; Antidesma frutescens Jack; Antidesma ghaesembilla var. genuinum Müll.Arg.; Antidesma pubescens Roxb.; Antidesma rhamnoides Brongn. ex Tul.; Antidesma schultzii Benth.; Antidesma spicatum Blanco; Antidesma vestitum C.Presl

= Antidesma ghaesembilla =

Species of plant

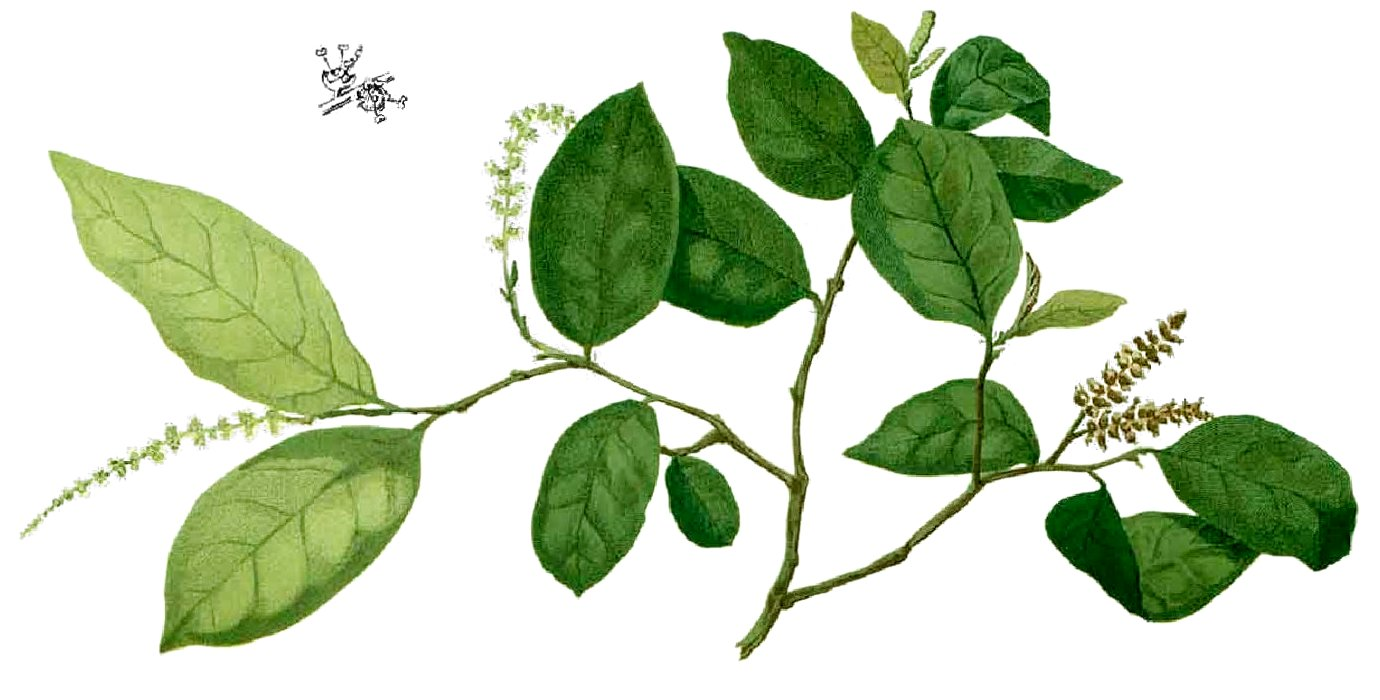

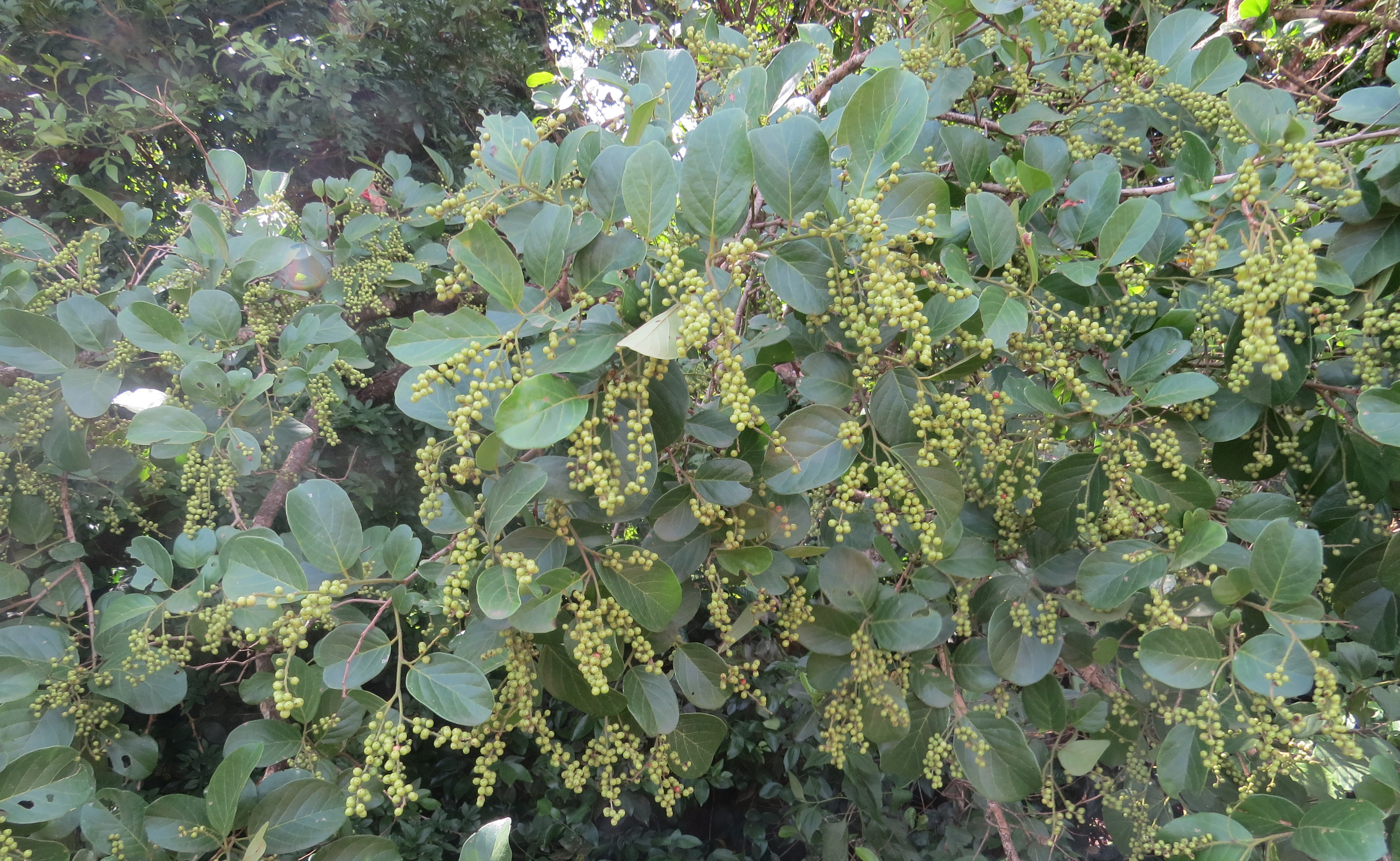

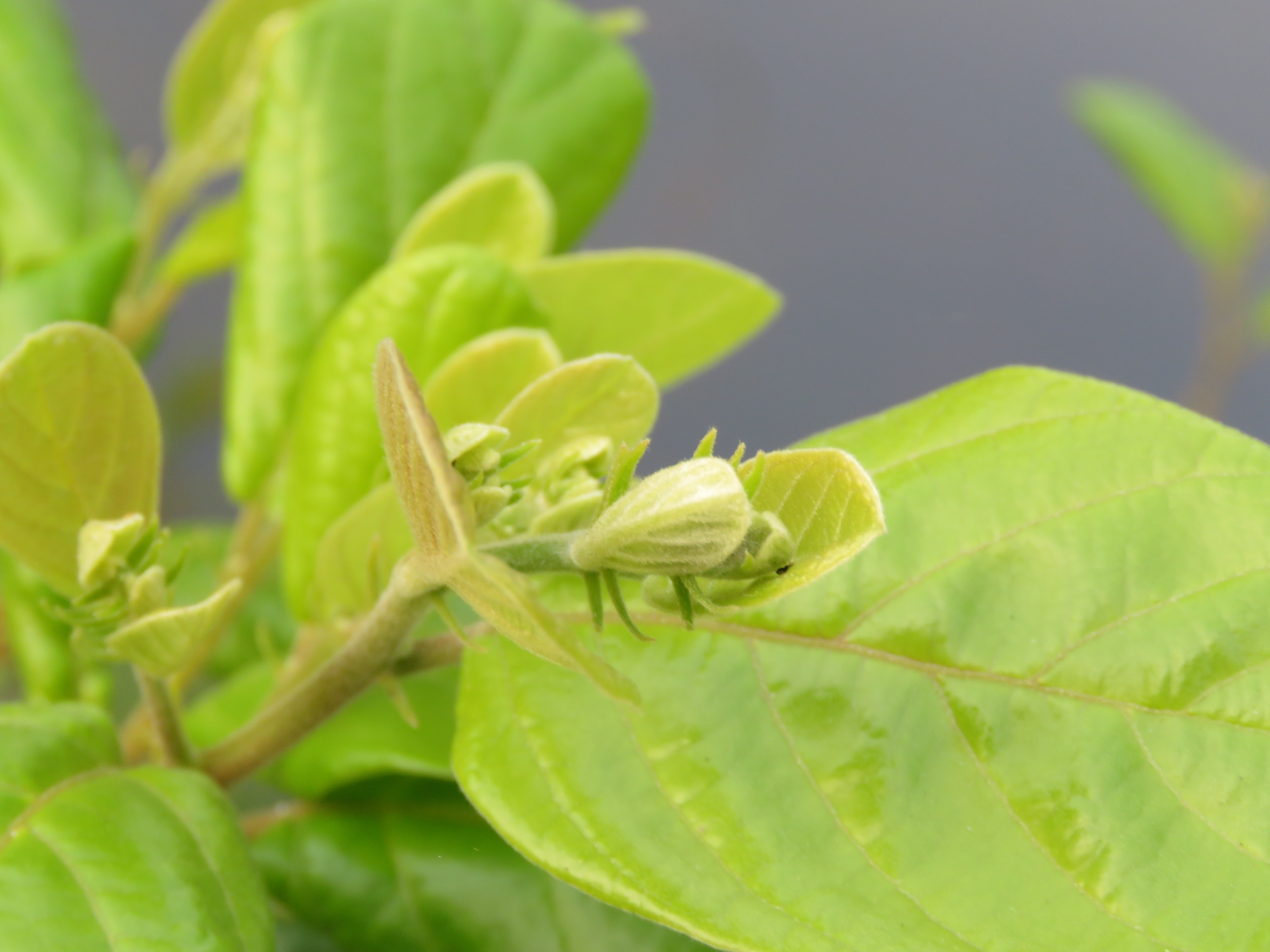

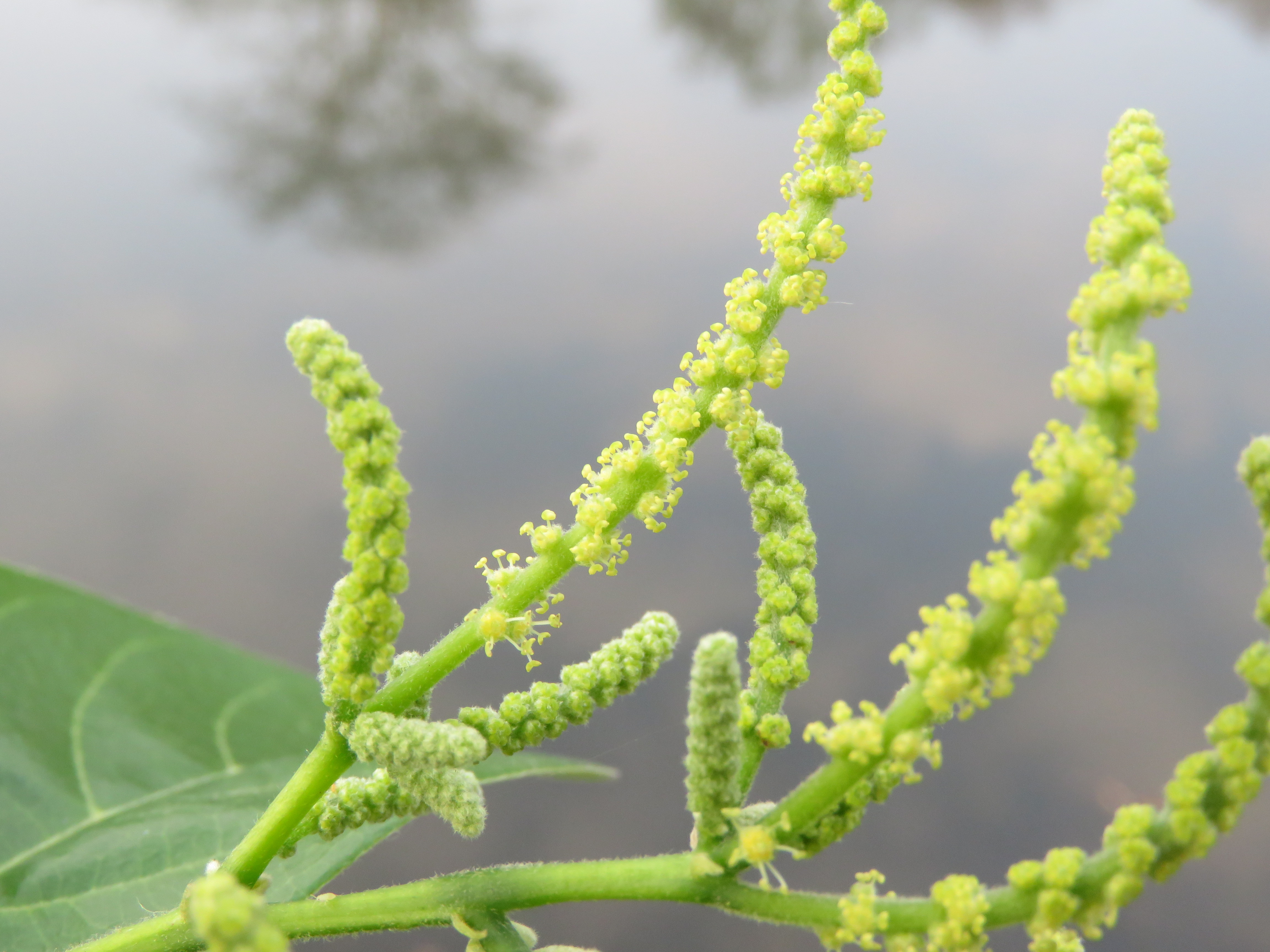

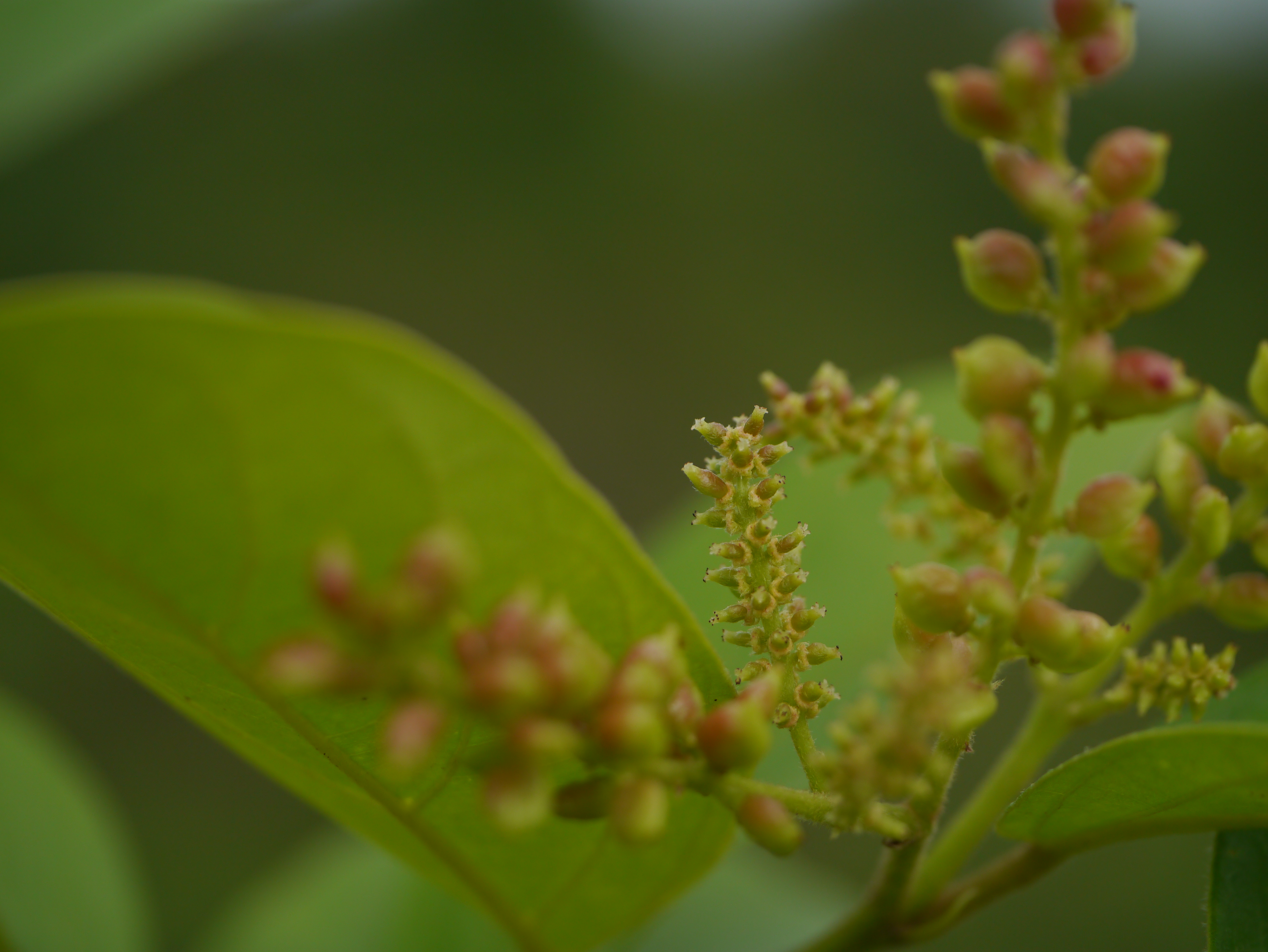

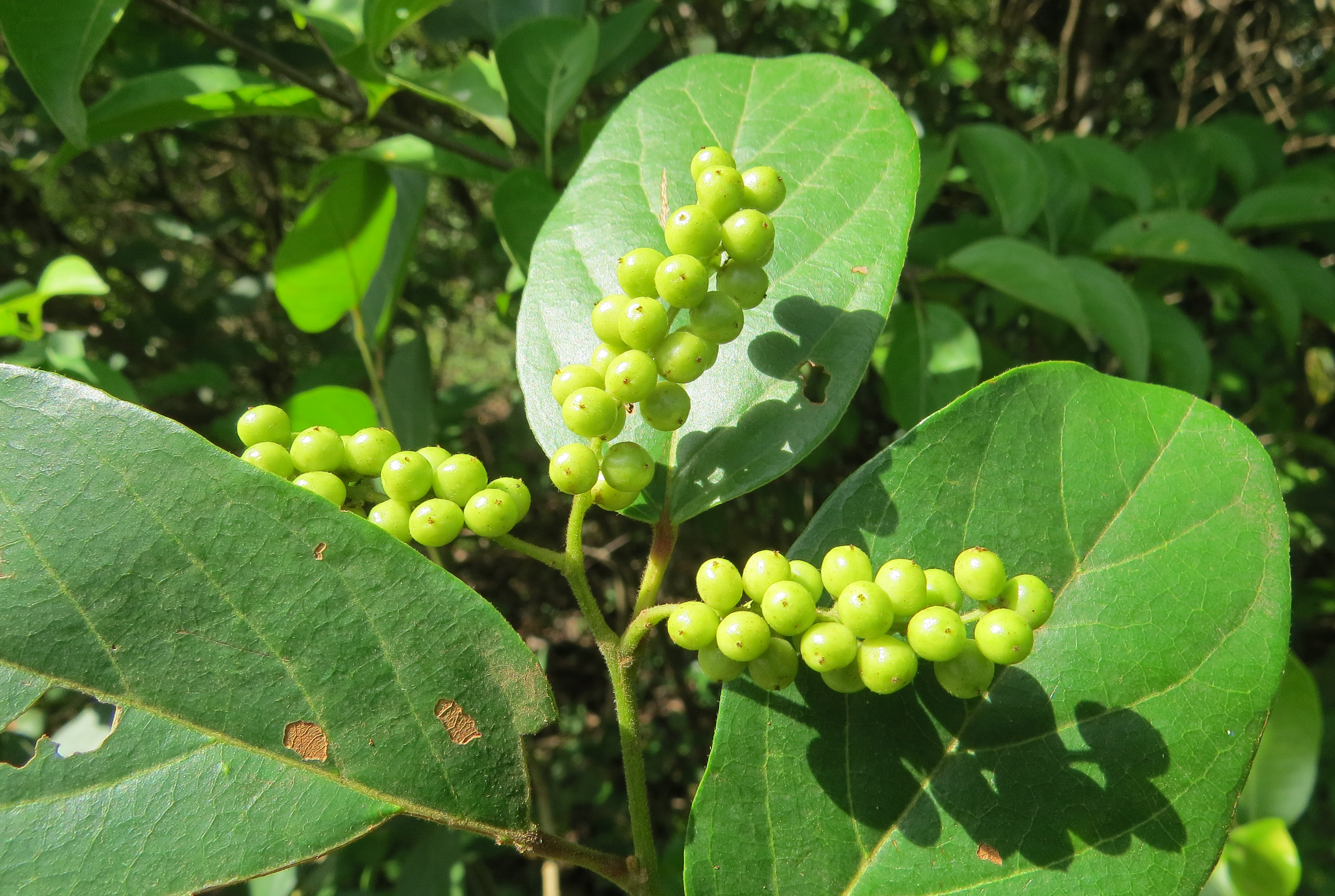

Antidesma ghaesembilla is a species of plant in the Phyllanthaceae family. It is native to an area from northern Australia to the Philippines, China, and west to India. The shrub or tree usually grows in moist soils in plant communities ranging from savannah to gallery forest to closed forest. It is associated with a number of species of fungus, insects and animals, including emus. Amongst the Mangarrayi and Yangman people of north Australia, the sweet ripe fruit of the tree are much appreciated and linked to the build-up season and to the koel. As well as food, the plant is used as a calendar-plant, for dyeing, in traditional medicine, in religious/magical practices, as fuel, and as an insecticide.

== Description ==
The taxa can grow as a shrub or a small tree, from 2 m (6 ft 7 in) up to 20 m (66 ft) high, in Australia often with a short, poorly-formed trunk/bole. Dark-coloured bark. Leaves are some 3–7 cm (1.2–2.8 in) by 3–5 cm (1.2–2.0 in) in size (sometimes as short as 2 cm or as long as 16 cm, as narrow as 2 cm and as wide as 9 cm), with curving lateral veins (but these do not form distinct loops inside the margin), oblong blade (occasionally ovate or obovate); pale twig lenticels; pubescent, filiform stipules; tufts of hair/domatia present; leaves dry to olive-green to reddish-green. Its flowers emerge at the axils or on the tip of branches. Male flowers have 4–5 stamens with u-shaped anthers, while female flowers have ovaries covered with soft hairs. Yellow-green flowers, some 1mm in diameter with pubescent disc, these are for both male and female flowers. Small fruit, only 4–5 mm long with a persistent calyx that is not disc-like. Seed germination occurs in 28–29 days. There are elliptic cotyledons, some 8 by 5 mm. At tenth leaf stage there are hairy petioles and hairy, filiform stipules (1–2 mm long). In Western Australia, flowering occurs from August to December. In Thailand, flowering and fruiting is all year round. In China, flowering is from March to September, while fruiting is from June to December.

Characteristics that help to distinguish the species are: the apex of the leaf is either rounded, retuse or obtuse; free sepals that are pubescent outside; the petiole is 0.7–1 mm wide; the fruiting pedicel is 0–1 mm; male disc consists of free pubescent lobes; the base of the leaf is cordate to rounded, occasionally obtuse; the ovary is pubescent.

== Distribution ==
The species is native to an area from northern Australia and New Guinea to tropical and Subtropical Asia, as far as the West Himalaya region and Southeast China. Countries and regions that it grows in include: Australia ({Queensland: Northeast and Cape York}, Northern Territory, {Western Australia: Kimberley}); Papua Niugini (including Bismarck Archipelago); Indonesia (West Papua, Maluku, Lesser Sunda Islands, Sulawesi, Kalimantan, Jawa, Sumatera); Philippines; Malaysia (Sabah, Sarawak, Peninsular Malaysia); Thailand; Cambodia; Vietnam; China (Guangdong, Guangxi, Hainan, Yunnan); Laos; Myanmar; India (including Andaman Islands, Nicobar Islands, Assam); Bangladesh; East Himalaya; Nepal; Sri Lanka; West Himalaya. The plant is introduced/naturalised in Guyana.

== Habitat and ecology ==
In Australia it is found in gallery, monsoon and closed forests, often on heavy soils that experience water-logging during wet season, at elevations from sea level to 600m. In the Kimberley of Western Australia, it occurs near swamps and watercourses, and in sandstone gorges, growing on alluvial and basalt soils. On the coast of the Northern Province, Papua New Guinea (PNG), the species grows in wooded patches in grasslands that experience frequent fires, the taxa is fire-resistant. The plant is characterised as growing in open forest or along the edge of dense forests by the Cambodian botanist Pauline Dy Phon. In China the species occurs in open scrub and in sparse, deciduous, evergreen or mixed dry forest at 200-1100m altitude.

The tree is associated with the Northern Australian mushroom Inocybe torresiae Matheny, Bougher & M.D.Barrett. The type specimens grew in a rich black soil of a monsoon forest of A. ghaesembilla and Glochidion disparipes, with other species of tree (Eucalyptus bigalerita, Corymbia bella, and Albizia procera) at a distance. Generally the mushroom is associated with Northern Australian tropical forests dominated by Allocasuarina, Eucalyptus or Acacia, or near Antidesma and Glochidion with myrtaceous plants at a distance. It is believed that the fungus is more associated, as in these plants being ectomycorrhizal host plants, with the Myrtaceae, but that perhaps they have a wider range of hosts including Phyllanthaceae (the family to which both Antidesma and Glochidion belong).

Within the Fogg Dam Conservation Reserve, Northern Territory, Australia, there are number of plant communities. The eucalypt-dominated mixed forest community contains Exocarpos latifolius and A. ghaesembilla, even though these are more typical of semideciduous monsoon rainforest.

Around Elsey, Northern Territory, and Roper River, emus like to eat the fruit, allowing hunters to predict their presence. According to Mangarrayi and Yangman biocultural knowledge, the dowo'min (Mangarrayi)/jowogban (Yangman) (Eudynamys orientalis, koel, a type of cuckoo) looks after the trees (see #Uses below for more on this relationship).

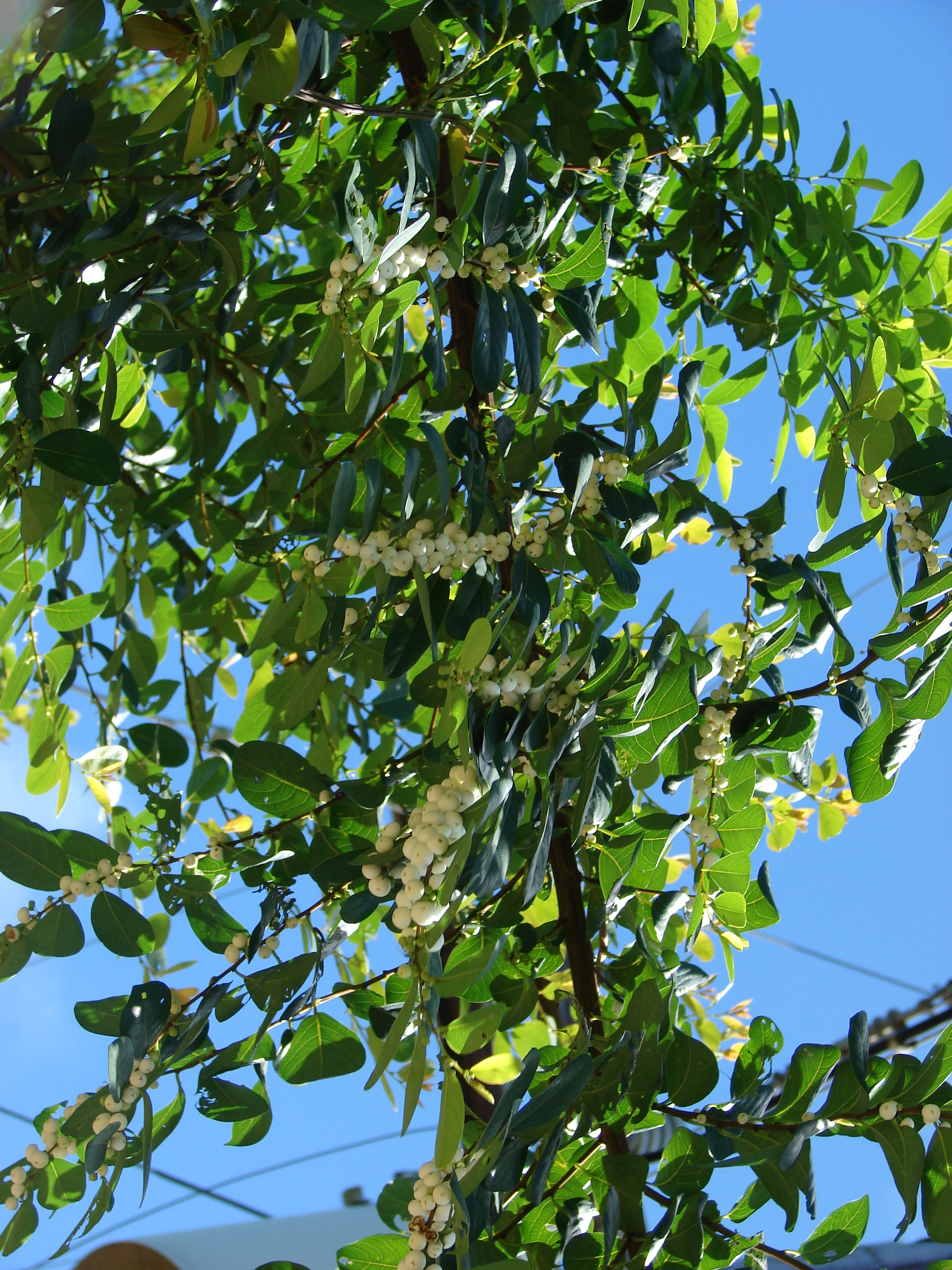
Runggu, countryman to ngujiyi in SE Kimberley

The species grows in the southeast Kimberley (Western Australia) and western Top End (Northern Territory) area of north Australia. Jaru people record it as growing along the banks of rivers and creeks, and that runggu (Fluegga virosa) is considered a "countryman" (individual linked spiritually and physically) to ngujiyi (A. ghaesembilla).

The tree is a host plant for the fungus Pestalotiopsis rhododendri in Australia and China, and for the sister species tea-pathogen fungus Pestalotiopsis theae in India. The species is a host of the Phakopsoraceae rust fungus Crossopsora antidesmae-dioicae in New Guinea, Indonesia, Philippines, China and Uganda. The funguses Aspergillus flavus and Penicillium spp. have been recorded on the seeds of the plant in the Philippines.

In the savannah country to the west of Port Moresby, Papua Niugini, the plant occurs as a pioneer tree after fire or cultivation, low in height and comparatively short lived. In northern PNG, at the plains of the Ramu and Markham Valleys, there were cycad savannahs until pasture improvement and cattle changed the lowland megatherm mid-height to tall grassland savanna to predominantly grass with permanent stands of Albizia procera and A. ghaesembilla and occasional Glochidion, Kleinhovia, Macaranga and Mallotus (plant). In the savannah that formerly grew around Port Moresby International Airport, PNG, there were isolated specimens growing in black clay soil along the gullies and creeks.

In the Tanimbar Archipelago, dry deciduous forest is found on the northeast coast of the main island of Yamdena. This forest has a 30m high canopy dominated by Ebenaceae, Fabaceae, Apocynaceae and Menispermaceae species, with this taxa a minor component of the lower canopy (below emergents and upper canopy, above the lower story (pole) layer).

The Semayan Village forest (Kutai Kartanegara Regency, east Kalimantan) is a riparian forest dominated by Lophopetalum javanicum, Mitragyna speciosa and Gluta renghas, with this species as a very minor component.

It is one of the plants that the thrip Dolichothrips reuteri associates with in the Philippines.

Growing throughout Thailand, this species is usually found in secondary vegetation, on soils that range from dry to inundated, in seasonally-flooded places, mounds in rice field and roadsides. In the floodplain of the Trang River, Trang Province, southern Thailand, the tree is one of the dominant taxa in the Mitragyna-Lagerstroemia-Glochidion shrubland of old rice fields that were flooded for 3 to 8 months. Dominant taxa are Mitragyna diversifolia, A. ghaesembilla, Phyllanthus subscandens var. subscandens, Leea rubra and Ziziphus oenopolia. The tree also is found in a community growing on the fringe of the floodplain, where inundation is seldom, as well as on termite hills or old semi-permanently-flooded rice fields, the Lagerostroemia-Streblus-Ziziphus shrubland, where the dominant taxa are Lagerstroemia floribunda, Streblus asper, Z. oenopolia, Microcos tomentosa, Melastoma malabathricum and A. ghaesembilla

This taxa is one of the hundreds of hosts of the two fruit fly species Bactrocera carambolae and Bactrocera dorsalis in Southeast Asia.

== Conservation status ==
The plant is rated as of Least Concern by the IUCN, because the taxa has a very wide distribution with a large population, and it is not currently experiencing or facing major threats. However, there is a continuing decline of mature individuals and its habitat is continually declining in area, extent and quality. The conservation status of the tree, while of least concern, is of some concern.

== Vernacular names ==
- murrunggurn (Mangarrayi language and Yangman language, north Australia)
- ngujiyi (Jaru language, north Australia)
- yangu (Western Australia)
- black currant tree, blackcurrant (Australian English)
- sigore (Yega, Papua Niugini)
- pendada (Desa Semayang, east Kalimantan)
- ku-chae (Malay language, Narathiwat, Thailand)
- mao thung (Songkhla, Chumphon, Thailand)
- ma mao khao bao (Chumphon, Thailand)
- mang mao (Chanthaburi, Thailand)
- mao khai pla (Chonburi, Thailand)
- mamao, khamao pha (northeastern Thailand)
- dângkiëp k'da:m, dongkiep kdam, dongkeabkdam (="crab claws", referring to shape of fruit, Khmer language)
- tarm eu greng (tarm="plant", Bunong language, Mondulkiri Province, eastern Cambodia)
- ak kraegn, kraegn lot (Bunong language, Mondulkiri Province)
- 方叶五月茶, fang ye wu yue cha (Standard Chinese
- onjam
- koontjir
- dempool

== Uses ==
In Australia, children eat the quite acidic fruit. When ripe it is dark purple and very high in Vitamin C.

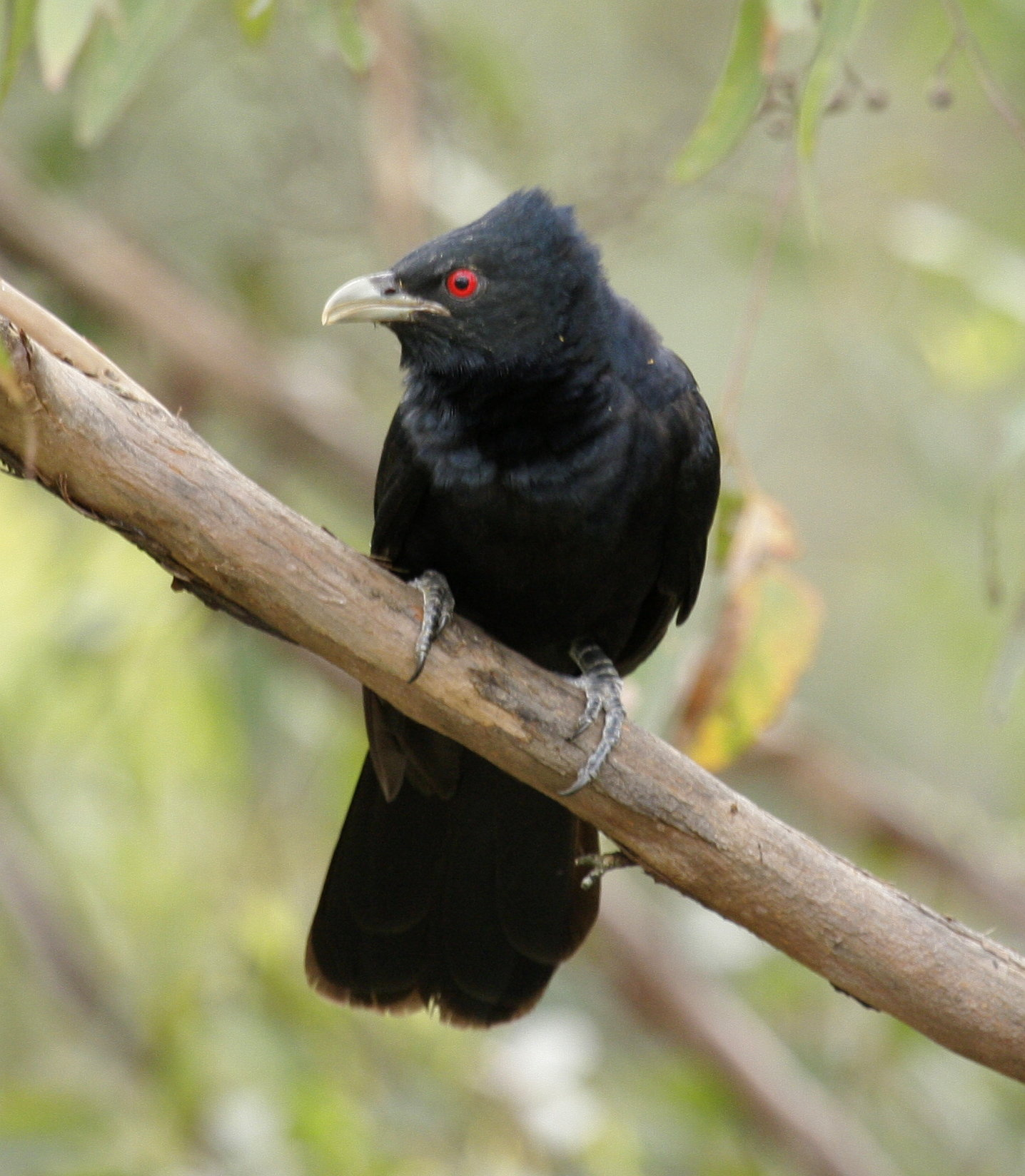
Male dowo'min / jowogban, who look after murrunggurn around Elsey and Roper River

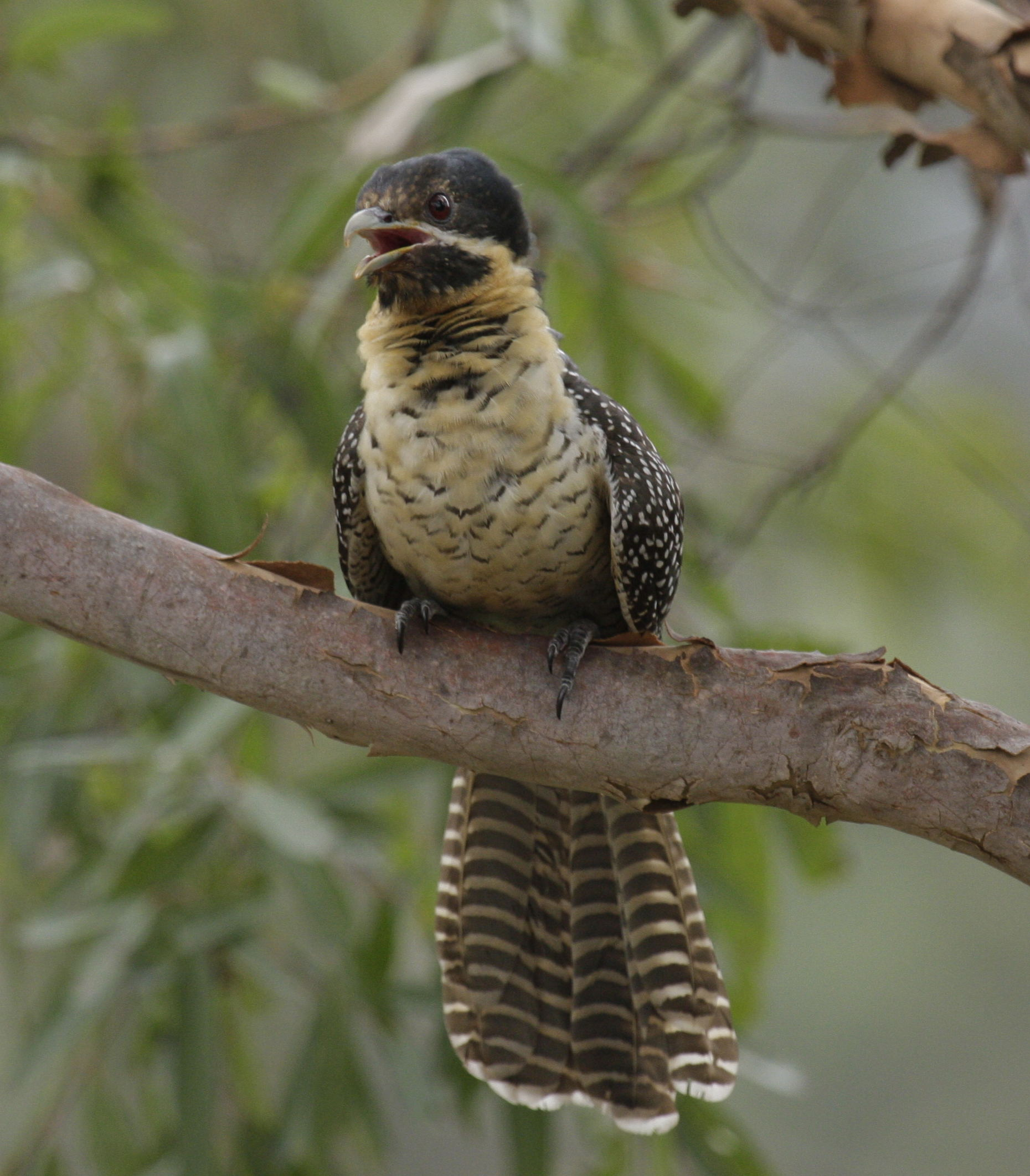
Female dowo'min / jowogban

The Mangarrayi and Yangman people of Elsey and the Roper River of north Australia eat the fruit when ripe (turning purple to black in colour). "They are very sweet and highly sought after when ripe". The fruit is also crushed and soaked in water to make a cordial-like drink. When eaten or drunk, peoples lips and tongue are stained a blue-purple colour. It is also a calendar plant: during Gaynwarr, the build-up or hot-weather time before the rains (monsoon), approximately August to November, the dowo'min (Mangarrayi) or jowogban (Yangman) (Eudynamys orientalis, koel/stormbird, a type of cuckoo) calls out during the build-up, telling the Mangarrayi and Yangman people that this fruit and 3 others are ready to harvest. The bird is held to "look after" the tree.

The Jaru people of the Kimberley and Top End in Australia describe the fruit as "sweet and tasty ... when they are ripe, black." Ripening occurs in the wet season.

In East Kalimantan, resin (nyatang) from the tree is burnt to make a black dye for sunhats.

The fruit is eaten fresh or pickled in Cambodia. Cambodian traditional medicine includes the following: young branches, mixed with papaya roots, to regulate menstruation; a mixture of the bark and tobacco is used to dress some wounds; crushed leaves are applied to the fontanelle of newly born babies to prevent them from catching the common cold.

The village of Pu Ndreng, Dak Dam commune, Ou Reang District, Mondulkiri Province, eastern Cambodia, has Bunong people making up 90% of its population. In that village the least expensive ailment to be treated by traditional medicines is "uterus pain", the treatments are local wild plants, including A. ghaesembilla.

In a wider study of ethnopharmacology of Bunong people in Mondulkiri, various parts of this plant (bark, wood, root, leaves) prepared in various ways were used to treat a variety of ailments (diarrhea, diarrhea and vomiting, post-partum care, stomach-ache, haemorrhoids, fever, cough, and cleaning wounds). The bark, grated and mixed with water, was applied to the skin as an insect-repellent. While the plant was cited by a high number of informants, there was little fidelity, little agreement on what ailments were to be treated by it. It was predominantly used in complex mixtures with other plants. The plant has been shown to possess anti-bacterial activity against gastrointestinal pathogenic bacteria.

A study has examined the treatment and management of liver diseases by Khmer traditional healers in the capital and largest city of Cambodia, Phnom Penh. These traditional healers cite various properties/effects of plants that they mentioned, one of the most common is psah, the ability to cure inflammations, infections, wounds, burns and repair tissue damage, whether internal or external, in a very efficient manner. A. ghaesembilla is held to have this property. When treating liver disease the wood of this plant is given in the forms of a decoction, infusion or pill. The study concludes that the healers are taking on new practices and rhetoric imported from biomedicine (scientific medicine), and therefore the healers are "neotraditional", ignoring the possibility that as with all cultural practices, the healer practice is dynamic, and what is "traditional" may merely represent a point in time.

Amongst Kuy- and Khmer-speaking people living in the same villages in Stung Treng and Preah Vihear provinces of north-central Cambodia, the tree is used as source of folk medicine, food, and fuel, and as a component in ritual/magical activities.

The leaves have been used in traditional medicine of Vietnam to treat skin diseases, while the fruit have been used to treat sore throats and lung diseases.

In China the fruit are eaten for food, while in local medicine the leaves are used for headaches, the stem to stimulate menstrual flow, the fruit as a purgative.

In Kerala the fruit is used as a seasoning ingredient in fish and meat dishes, while tribal people in India use the plant in folk medicine as a sedative.

== History ==
The species was named in 1788 by the German botanist Joseph Gaertner (1732–1791), who worked in the now Netherlands and Russia. He described this taxa in his work De Fructibus et Seminibus Plantarum.
