= Dagoman =

Ethnic group from near Katherine, Northern Territory

The Dagoman was a group of Indigenous Australians living in the Northern Territory of Australia.

== Language ==
The Dagoman language was one of the non-Pama–Nyungan languages, closely related to its congeners, Wardaman and Yangman. All three may be considered to be dialects of the one language isolate. The language is extinct, the last known speaker being Mrs Martha Hart of Pine Creek, who died in 1982. There is a considerable overlap of vocabulary and typological features with Wakiman.

== Country ==
Tindale mapped the Dagoman's general area as running northeast of the middle Daly River and south to the junction of the Flora and Katherine rivers and at Jindare, and estimated their territory as encompassing some 1,600 sq. m. (4,200 km^{2}.). Their country lay to the north of that of the Wardaman people, while its borders with those of the Jawoyn were at Kumbidgee by the water-hole of the rock bat (Wallan, in Jawoyn legend), along the old north–south road running from Maranboy to Katherine.

According to Nolgoyma, an elderly headman, one of the remnant of Dagoman survivors, their land's extent was as follows:

The long axis stretch(es) from the Ferguson River and the lower King across the valley of the lower Edith and Katherine (sic) river to the headwaters of the Roper River. It straddles the watershed between the Indian Ocean and the Gulf of Carpentaria.- The key site of the northwest extremity was a place called Bamboo Creek on the Ferguson River where the supplies of bamboo spear shafts were obtained. This was quite definitely Tagoman property and their rights probably did extend somewhat beyond this point as Tindale indicates. Also Edith for axe heads. The key site at the southeast end of the territory was Leach Lagoon which drains into Roper Creek. This was the Turtle Dreaming place and the source of pipey (?) timber for didgeridoos... The waterholes at Oluydune Dyrinyan and Wongalla (Wangala) on the King River were also in Tagoman territory.. The SW limit of the territory was fixed by the right bank of the Katherine river from the Ferguson junction upstream at least as far as the Limestone Creek junction.

== People ==
W. Arndt, an agricultural research officer stationed in Katherine, came across an elderly Dagoman, Nolgoyma, soon to die, who was the headman of the few surviving members of the group and who provided him with some information. While taking down notes, Arndt had the impression he was recording a people who had hitherto been overlooked in the ethnographic literature. He made a brief report on their use of indigenous cereals for the journal Oceania in 1961, disclosing that this was part of a manuscript he had prepared, but not yet published, entitled "Recognition of the Previous Existence, Industry, Mythology and Rock Art of the Tagoman in the Katherine District, Northern territory".

== Sorghum ==
Three varieties of indigenous sorghum seed were gathered as foodstuffs by the Dagoman, Sorghum plumosum, Sorghum intrans and Sorghum macrospermum.

== Alternative names ==
- Togeman
- Dogeman
- Togiman
- Tagoman

== Sources ==
- Arndt, W. (December 1961). "Indigenous Sorghum as Food and in Myth: The Tagoman Tribe". Oceania. 32 (2): 109–112. doi:10.1002/j.1834-4461.1961.tb01745.x. JSTOR 40329309.
- "Dagoman". ethnologue. 2016.
- David, Bruno; Wilson, Meredith (2002). "Spaces of Resistance: Graffiti and Indigenous Place Markings in the Early European Contact Period of Northern Australia". In David, Bruno; Wilson, Meredith (eds.). Inscribed Landscapes: Marking and Making Place. University of Hawaii Press. pp. 42–. ISBN 978-0-824-82472-3.
- Davidson, D. S. (January–June 1935). "Archaeological Problems of Northern Australia". The Journal of the Royal Anthropological Institute of Great Britain and Ireland. 65: 145–183. doi:10.2307/2843847. JSTOR 2843847.
- Merlan, Francesca (1994). A Grammar of Wardaman: A Language of the Northern Territory of Australia. Walter de Gruyter. ISBN 978-3-110-12942-7.
- Merlan, Francesca (1998). Caging the Rainbow: Places, Politics, and Aborigines in a North Australian Town. University of Hawaii Press. ISBN 978-0-824-82045-9.
- Tindale, Norman Barnett (1974). "Dagoman (NT)". Aboriginal Tribes of Australia: Their Terrain, Environmental Controls, Distribution, Limits, and Proper Names. Australian National University Press. ISBN 978-0-708-10741-6. Archived from the original on 20 March 2020.
