= Wardaman =

Wardaman may refer to:

- Wardaman people, an indigenous group of Australia
- Wardaman language, the language isolate spoken by them
