= Wardaman people =

Aboriginal Australian people of the Northern Territory

The Wardaman people are a small group of Aboriginal Australians living about 145 kilometres (90 mi) South-West of Katherine, on Menngen Aboriginal Land Trust in the Northern Territory of Australia.

== Language ==
Wardaman is a non-Pama-Nyungan language. Though close to being a moribund language, it was, as late as the early 1990s, one of the most widely spoken Aboriginal languages in Katherine, with an estimated 30 speakers and perhaps 200 or more people who could understand it if spoken.

== Country ==
The Wardaman controlled, according to Norman Tindale, some 7,300 square kilometres (2,800 mi^{2}) of territory from the headwaters of the southern branches of the upper Flora River, and westwards as far as the Victoria River Depot. Their southern limits lay around Jasper Gorge. The Wardaman presence, attested in post-contact times, at Delamere is historically recent.

== History of contact ==
European contact with Wardaman and related peoples like the Dagoman and Yangman was characterized from the outset by considerable violence. Eventually, as their tribal lands were given over to pastoral leases, the men mastered trades such as cattle-droving, while the women were employed as help.

== Rock art ==
The Wardaman distinguish two types of art: those objects made by creative beings in the primordial dreamtime, called buwarraja, and objects made by people, bulawula. The latter deals with more recent historical topics, such as events that occurred after whites occupied the country, featuring such things as guns and cattle-droving. Buwarraja designs are more abstract and have an extremely ancient history, some going back at least 5,000 years.

== Mythology ==
Wardaman legends of the dreamtime speak of Yagjagbula and Jabirringi, the "Lightning Brothers" of the Jabijin sub-section associated with the onset of the wet season, and who are represented in Wardaman rock art sacred sites, such as Yiwarlarlay. (Note: The American anthropologist D. S. Sutherland, was the first white person to mention sighting the Yiwarlarlay rock art, in 1936. Comparison of photographs indicates that these pictures were further worked and elaborated since that time.)

Yagjagbula, the younger of the two, is tall and handsome, and has a wife, Gulliridan, while Jabirringi is shorter, and somewhat plain-looking. The latter's spouse is called Ganayanda. The brothers hunt on alternate days, each bringing the day's game back to the camp. At a certain point, as he comes back from his hunting, Jabirringi overhears whispering in a rocky area, and discovers his wife copulating with his younger brother. A pitched battle between the two ensues on open ground, and, as spears and boomerangs are thrown, lightning flashes and thunderclaps roar. When a bolt of lightning cleaves the sandstone rockface at Yiwarlarlay, frogs emerge to watch, slapping their thighs rhythmically as the two fight on. Passing over en route to the Yingalarri water-hole, Wiyan, the rain, is told by Gorondolni, the Wardaman Rainbow serpent, to halt, whereby it is transformed into the Ngalanjarri rain rock close by. Yagjagbula eventually comes out the victor, either by knocking Jabirringi's headdress off, or by decapitating him, with his boomerang. The scene depicting this primordial conflict depicts Yagjagbula as being over 4 metres high, and the figure is one of the largest anthropomorphs in the world.

== Today ==
The Wardaman community in Katherine are concentrated in two camps, south and west of the township. One group is at Bunjarri (Binjara) on the Manbulloo station about 7.5 miles from Katherine, and the other is at The Rockhole, just over 6 miles outside the town, on the Florina Highway.

== Notable people ==
- Bill Yidumduma Harney, advocate for Indigenous Australians and author of several books
- Andrew McLeod, AFL Hall of Fame inductee and games-played record holder for Adelaide Football Club
- Jason Horne-Francis, number one overall AFL draft pick from 2021 and current player for Port Adelaide Football Club

== Sources ==
- Cairns, Hugh Campbell; Harney, Bill Yidumduma (1993). Dark sparklers: Yidumduma's Wardaman Aboriginal astronomy. Cairns.
- David, Bruno; Wilson, Meredith (2002). "Spaces of Resistance:Graffiti and Indigenous Place Markings in the Early European Contact period of Northern Australia". In David, Bruno; Wilson, Meredith (eds.). Inscribed Landscapes: Marking and Making Place. University of Hawaii Press. pp. 42–60. ISBN 978-0-824-82472-3.
- Merlan, Francesca (1994). A Grammar of Wardaman: A Language of the Northern Territory of Australia. Walter de Gruyter. ISBN 978-3-110-12942-7.
- Probyn-Rapsey, Fiona (2013). Made to Matter: White Fathers, Stolen Generations. Sydney University Press. ISBN 978-1-920-89997-4.
- Tindale, Norman Barnett (1974). "Wardaman (NT)". Aboriginal Tribes of Australia: Their Terrain, Environmental Controls, Distribution, Limits, and Proper Names. Australian National University Press. ISBN 978-0-708-10741-6.
