= Mangarayi =

Indigenous Australian people of the Northern Territory

The Mangarayi, also written Mangarai, were an Indigenous Australian people of the Northern Territory.

== Language ==
Mangarayi is thought to be one of the Gunwingguan languages. Francesca Merlan published a grammar of the language in 1982, one that is notable also for the difficulty it presents for determining whether it is a tensed or non-tensed language. The linguist Margaret Sharpe was deterred from pursuing more intensive studies of Mangarayi by a station owner who grew annoyed with the presence of metropolitan anthropologists and linguists coming to study the indigenous people on his cattle run.

== Country ==
The Mangarayi held sway over an estimated 4,500 square miles (12,000 km^{2}) of land on the middle and upper courses of Roper River as far as Mount Lindsay. Their traditional grounds took in east of Mataranka and Maranboy, Mount Emily, Elsey, and Beswick. The north-eastern frontier lay around Mount Elsie.

== History ==
Some Mangarayi were thought to have been implicated in the murder of a telegraph worker from Daly Waters that took place on 30 June 1875. A large party of police and vigilantes set out to exact a thorough revenge by slaughtering large numbers of the Mangarayi and people of other tribes along the length of the Roper River in August of that year.

== Alternative names ==
- Mangarei, Manggarai
- Mungarai
- Mungerry
- Walooka (?)

Source: Tindale 1974, p. 227

== Sources ==
- Grimes, Barbara Dix (2003). "Gunwingguan languages". In Frawley, William (ed.). International Encyclopedia of Linguistics: AAVE-Esperanto. Vol. 1. Oxford University Press. pp. 119–120. ISBN 978-0-195-13977-8.
- Lowre, James (1886). "Roper River Tribe" (PDF). In Curr, Edward Micklethwaite (ed.). The Australian race: its origin, languages, customs, place of landing in Australia and the routes by which it spread itself over the continent. Vol. 1. Melbourne: J. Ferres. pp. 276–278.
- Mathews, R. H. (1900). "Marriage and descent among the Australian aborigines". Journal of the Proceedings of the Royal Society of New South Wales. 34. Sydney: 120–135. doi:10.5962/p.359341. S2CID 259735456.
- Roberts, Tony (November 2009). "The brutal truth: What happened in the gulf country". The Monthly.
- Sharpe, Margaret (2008). "Alawa And its neighbours: Enigma Variations 1 and 2". In Bowern, Claire; Evans, Bethwyn; Miceli, Luisa (eds.). Morphology and Language History: In honour of Harold Koch. John Benjamins Publishing. pp. 59–70. ISBN 978-3-110-27977-1.
- Spencer, Baldwin (1914). Native tribes of the Northern Territory of Australia (PDF). London: Macmillan Publishers.
- Tindale, Norman Barnett (1974). "Mangarai (NT)". Aboriginal Tribes of Australia: Their Terrain, Environmental Controls, Distribution, Limits, and Proper Names. Australian National University. ISBN 978-0-708-10741-6. Archived from the original on 20 March 2020.
- Wetzer, Harrie (1996). The Typology of Adjectival Predication. Walter de Gruyter. ISBN 978-3-110-14989-0.
