= David Blanasi =

David Blanasi (c. 1930 – disappeared 2001), also known as David Bylanadji, also spelt David Bulanatji, was an Aboriginal Australian player and maker of the didgeridoo, known as master of the "Kunbjorrk" or "Gunborg" style of playing. He is known for popularising the didgeridoo outside Australia, after appearing on television on The Rolf Harris Show in 1967. He subsequently travelled the world playing his instrument with his musical partner, songman Djoli "Jolly Lajwonga" Laiwanga, and was widely recognised for his skills. He was less well-known for his artwork, but he was also a skilled painter, using acrylic paint on canvas. He disappeared from his community of Beswick (now Wugularr) in 2001. He was a co-founder of the White Cockatoo Performing Group, which is still in existence. Darryl Dikarrna Brown, who was apprenticed to Blanasi, is part of the group and has assumed the mantle of master of the Gunborg style.

== Early life ==
David Blanasi was born around 1930. Blanasi is a corruption of his Aboriginal name, Bylanadji, also spelt Bulanatji. He was of the Mayali language group of west Arnhem Land.

Blanasi first experimented with the didgeridoo at an early age, imitating the sounds of various animals, including the brolga, one of two animals representing the moieties of his clan. His father later taught him to improve his playing skills, as well as traditional methods of making musical instruments.

== Musical career ==
Blanasi developed a reputation as a virtuoso player of traditional Kun-borrk (Gunborg) syncopation. He travelled extensively from the 1950s onwards.

He first came to public attention as one of a number of traditional Aboriginal didgeridoo players and songmen recorded in 1961-62 by a US linguistic researcher La Mont West. These recordings were released commercially in 1963 on an LP record Arnhem Land Popular Classics. The album was added to the National Film and Sound Archive's Sounds of Australia in 2020, "for sparking wider interest in the instrument family known as the didgeridoo".

In 1965, Blanasi gave a live performance at the Sydney Trade Fair in Sydney.

In 1967 he became the first "full-blood" Aboriginal Australian to travel to England since 1792. He travelled to London with Rolf Harris in March 1967, appearing live on The Rolf Harris Show on Saturday 1 April for the first time. He had insisted on taking his weapons on the plane with him. He taught Harris how to play the didgeridoo while on tour with him, which began ongoing professional association. He continued to give didgeridoo-playing demonstrations on Harris's BBC One show. Musical collaborations and tours with Harris followed, as well as Australian and international tours as part of a traditional dance troupe, which variously included his lifelong partner and songman Djoli Laiwanga, also spelt Laiwonga, and also known as "Jolly Lajwonga".

In 1970, Blanasi performed under the auspices of the Aboriginal Theatre Foundation (later rebranded Aboriginal Cultural Foundation) at Expo 70 in Osaka, Japan, along with Laiwanga and David Gulpilil. Principal Australian artist at the Expo was Rolf Harris.

In 1972, Blanasi gave a live performance at the South Pacific Festival of Arts in Suva, Fiji, which was recorded and an album made, and in 1973 he performed at the opening of the Sydney Opera House.

In September 1974, Blanasi accompanied Rolf Harris (along with country singers Judy Stone and Ross Ryan) to perform at Expo '74 in Spokane, Washington, United States. Helen Reddy and many other well-known performers also performed at the event.

In 1976, another live performance was recorded at 2nd South Pacific Festival of Arts at rotorua, New Zealand, released on LP and cassette, named "Bamyili Corroboree - Songs of Djoli Laiwanga".

In 1979, Blanasi, with Laiwanga, accompanied dancers David Gulpilil and Dick Plummer on a tour to Europe, stopping at Hawaii en route. There, they performed at an Australia Day function on the lawn of the Australian Consular Residence in Honolulu on 29 January 1979. Part of their performance was filmed by CSIRO scientist Gavin Gillman, and is in the collection of the National Film and Sound Archive of Australia. He performed in the Bishop Museum in Honolulu. In France, he performed at the Festival des Arts Traditionnels, and an LP and CD were released under the title Les Aborigenes - Chants et danses de l'Australie du nord.

In 1980, he played at another edition of the South Pacific Festival of Arts, held in Port Moresby, Papua New Guinea, with a third album release.

In 1982, Laiwonga was awarded a Medal of the Order of Australia in the Queen's Birthday Honours List, for service to Aboriginal culture and arts.

In 1992 Blanasi appeared in a film with non-Indigenous didgeridoo player Charlie McMahon, called Didjeridu: with Charlie McMahon.

Blanasi performed as part of the White Cockatoo Performing Group on several tours. In 1999 Blanasi did another US tour, giving workshops.

In 2001, David Blanasi Tribute Album 1998-2001 was released as a CD.

=== White Cockatoo Performing Group ===
Blanasi co-founded the "White Cockatoo Performing Group" in conjunction with senior songmen Jack Nawilill (born 1945) and David Yirindilli (1941–2006), along with his lifelong music partner, songmaster Djoli Laiwanga (also spelt "Laiwonga"). Laiwonga was known as the Black Cockatoo, and Blanasi as the White Cockatoo. and In 1989, the group toured to the US.

In 1998 White Cockatoo Performing Group toured the US, Canada, and UK, with a CD album of live recordings released as Didjeridu Master. In New York City they performed at the World Music Institute. In the same year, they toured the UK with Rolf Harris. They played with Stephen Kent, Ed Drury and Robert Mirabal in the US.

In 2000, White Cockatoo Performing Group did a European tour, performing in Ireland, Germany, Denmark, Sweden, Norway, Finland, England, and the Netherlands, which included representing Australia in Expo 2000 in Hanover, Germany.

In March 2001, White Cockatoo Performing Group performed at WOMADelaide in Adelaide, South Australia, and later that year did another tour of Europe.

After Laiwonga's death in 1998, and Blanasi's disappearance in 2001, their songs were passed on to the other songment Jack Nawilill and David Yirindilli, as well as Blanasi's Didjeridu apprentice, Darryl Dikarrna, who "inherited these songs in what is one of the world's oldest unbroken artistic traditions". Yirindilli died in 2006.

The company performed at the first National Aboriginal Festival, held at the National Museum of Australia in Canberra in October 2001, and continued to tour Europe many times as well as Canada. In 2005 they performed at the inaugural Aboriginal Dreaming Festival in Queensland, and in 2006 toured Japan for the first time as guests of the Dinkum Aussie Club. In August 2006 they performed at the Darwin Festival.

Darryl Dikarrna Brown has taken Blanasi's place as the "Kunbjorrk" didjeridu master for this corroboree, playing in the tradition of Blanasi.

== Recognition ==
A 2009 article about the didgeridoo in The Guardian said that Blanasi was the instrument's "first superstar", and that he was one of several "didgeridoo legends", a group that included Darryl Digarrnga, Jeremy Donovan, Mark Atkins, William Barton, Adrian Burragubba, and Alan Dargin. The article further said "The didgeridoo equivalent of a Stradivarius would be a didgeridoo crafted by David Blanasi".

== Personal life ==
Blanasi lived in south-central Arnhem Land in the Northern Territory, Australia, in a remote Aboriginal settlement variously known as Beswick, also known as Wugularr, and in nearby Bamyili (now known as Barunga).

== Disappearance and legacy ==
In 1998 Djoli Laiwonga died, and Blanasi retired in solitude to a home in Bamyili.

He went missing in August 2001, reportedly after going out to search for wood to be used in instrument-making. Newspaper coverage brought the situation into the public eye, and his disappearance generated widespread speculation. As of 2024, no trace of Blanasi has been found. Although his body was never found, his family eventually held a funeral ceremony for him. It was later observed that Beswick was "dysfunctional and unhealthy" at the time of his disappearance, although it had since developed into a thriving and healthy community.

Blanasi is acknowledged as one of the great master mago (didgeridoo) players of the 20th century and as a master instrument maker his didgeridoos have become highly collectible.

The Blanasi Collection is a permanent exhibition of culturally significant artworks in the West Arnhem painting style curated by Blanasi, held at Djilpin Arts centre in Wugularr (Beswick) since 2008. The collection was begun in 1996, when a group of senior artists and elders, led by Blanasi (who was also a painter), wanted to showcase the art and culture of their community. There are 12 of Blanasi's artworks, which are all large Acrylic paintings on canvas using intricate cross-hatching that tell the stories of his Mayali clan.

In 2014 the hour-long documentary film Kundirri: The Life and Legacy of David Blanasi was released. It is described thus by the Documentary Australia Foundation: "The people of Beswick share the exceptional story of David Blanasi's life, country and culture. Told through the paintings, songs and stories of the breathtaking 39 piece collection; the extensive archive material of his music and international work; and the stories of old and young remembering his life. Kundirri tells the mystery, tragedy and incredible legacy of David Blanasi that thrives today". The film was co-written by Tom E. Lewis and his wife Fleur Parry, co-directed by Lewis and Julia Morris, and co-produced by Parry and Morris. Funding was raised by the Documentary Australia Foundation, and the film was in post-production as of March 2012, and an official trailer was released on YouTube on 27 June 2013 by Djilpin Arts.

As of 2020 his grandson, Darryl Dikarrna, continues his tradition in the White Cockatoo Performing Group, after being appointed successor by his grandfather.

== In film ==
- 1992: Didjeridu: With Charlie McMahon. Written and directed by Jeni Kendell, and co-produced by Kendell and Paul Tait.
- 2014: Kundirri: The Life and Legacy of David Blanasi

== See also ==
- List of didgeridoo players
- Indigenous Australians
- Indigenous music of Australia
