= Barrumbi Kids =

Australian drama TV serie

- Based on: The Barrumbi Kids by Leonie Norrington
- Directed by: Deborah Brown; Grant Brown; Ismail Khan; Justin Schneider
- Country of origin: Australia
- Original language: English
- No. of seasons: 1
- No. of episodes: 10

Production
- Producers: Danielle MacLean; Monica O'Brien; Julia Morris
- Production location: Northern Territory
- Running time: 24 minutes
- Production companies: Tamarind Tree Pictures; Ambience Entertainment

Original release
- Network: NITV
- Release: November 18, 2022 – present

Barrumbi Kids is an Australian drama television series for children on NITV. It is based on The Barrumbi Kids series of novels by Leonie Norrington.

== Synopsis ==
Through their shared activities, two children learn about the different cultures in their remote Northern Territory community.

== Cast ==
- Nick Bonson as Tomias
- Caitlin Hordern as Dahlia
- Sherona Tiati
- Zeallion Andrew
- Ronon Bonson
- Justine Clarke
- Jacob Junior Nayinggul
- Frances Djulibing
- Adrienne Pickering
- Christopher Sommers
- Sophia Emberson-Bain
- Finn Treacy
- Serene Yunupingu
- Penelope Thomas
- Stephen Mahy
- Scott Hall

== Production ==
The series was filmed in Wugularr, Barunga, Katherine and Bitter Springs on the lands of the Jawoyn, Dogoman, Wardaman and Mangarrayi peoples.
