= Jeff McMullen =

Australian journalist

Jeff McMullen AM
- Born: Jeffrey John McMullen; 16 December 1948 (age 77); Sydney, New South Wales, Australia
- Education: Macquarie University
- Occupations: Journalist; author; television presenter; radio presenter
- Years active: 1966–present
- Known for: Foreign Correspondent for the Australian Broadcasting Corporation (1966-1984); Four Corners as International reporter; 60 Minutes as correspondent (1985–2000)

Jeffrey John McMullen AM (born 16 December 1948) is an Australian journalist and author and television and radio presenter. He was a foreign correspondent for the Australian Broadcasting Corporation for almost two decades (1966–1984), and later joined the Australian version of 60 Minutes (1985–2000). He has written numerous articles and several books, and is known for championing the rights of Aboriginal and Torres Strait Islander peoples.

== Early life and education ==
McMullen graduated from Macquarie University with a Bachelor of Arts.

== Media career ==
=== Career at the ABC ===
McMullen was a foreign correspondent for the Australian Broadcasting Corporation for almost two decades (1966–1984), international reporter for the investigative television program Four Corners and later joined the Australian version of 60 Minutes (1985–2000).

In 2007, he hosted a 33-part discussion series on ABC1 titled Difference of Opinion.

He also chaired many Indigenous forums on NITV. In 2014, McMullen appeared as himself in the second episode of Black Comedy, an Australian sketch show, in a mockumentary about an indigenous boy "tragically born without any sporting ability".

== Other roles ==
Through his work, McMullen has campaigned for improvement in health, education, and access to human rights for Indigenous Australians.

From 2000 to 2014 McMullen led Ian Thorpe's Fountain for Youth, focused on education in remote Australian Aboriginal communities. The charity went into voluntary liquidation in early 2015, with remaining funds being redirected to AIME, the Australian Indigenous Mentoring Experience. McMullen was a director of AIME for 15 years, helping to grow Jack Manning Bancroft's education movement connecting university undergraduates as mentors for Aboriginal high-school students in urban areas.

He was also a Director of Engineering Aid Australia, a philanthropic organisation whose primary initiative is the Indigenous Australian Engineering Summer School (IAESS) operating in New South Wales as well as at Curtin University in Western Australia. IAESS aims to build opportunities for Aboriginal high school students to pursue tertiary studies and subsequently careers in engineering.

In North Queensland, McMullen worked with Jirribel Aboriginal elder Ernie Grant on his holistic education project, described in My Land My Tracks, and also with Grant's daughter, Sonya Jeffrey, in growing the cultural education project at Echo Creek, near Tully.

At Beswick Falls, Northern Territory, McMullen was patron of the annual Walking with Spirits festival, staged by Tom E. Lewis and Djilpin Arts Aboriginal Corporation, which celebrates the ancient culture of Aboriginal people. He was a long-time friend of Lewis.

In 2015, Gurindji elders invited McMullen to deliver the annual Vincent Lingiari Oration at Charles Darwin University, honouring those who led the ongoing struggle for Aboriginal land rights.

=== Aboriginal health ===
As a founding trustee of the Jimmy Little Foundation, McMullen worked with Jimmy Little and Aboriginal doctors and medical services to improve kidney dialysis, as well as introducing "Uncle Jimmy's Thumbs Up" nutrition program, aimed at reducing and preventing chronic illness in Indigenous communities.

He has chaired the council meetings of the National Aboriginal Community Controlled Health Organisation and joined their advocacy in federal Parliament.

At prime minister Kevin Rudd's 2020 Summit, McMullen was among the 100 people focussed on "Closing the Gap" in Indigenous life expectancy, and improving the well-being of Aboriginal communities.

He was founding patron of the University of Canberra's Healthpact Centre developing health promotion and social equality programs, especially for Aboriginal children.

== Honours ==
In 2006, McMullen was appointed a Member of the Order of Australia (AM), for service to journalism and efforts to raise awareness of economic, social and human rights issues in Australia and overseas, as well as service to charity.

Variety, the Children's Charity declared McMullen Humanitarian of the Year for 2006 and he contributed the $10,000 prize money to the Literacy for Life project.

He has been awarded three honorary degrees: a Doctorate of Journalism from Central Queensland University; a Doctorate of Letters from Newcastle University; and a Doctor of Letters from Macquarie University.

== Publications ==
McMullen is the author of a number of books, including:

- A Life of Extremes – Journeys and Encounters (HarperCollins Australia 2001) It examines ideas gleaned from some of the world's bravest individuals contributing to a brighter future for the human family.
- Dispossession : Neoliberalism and the struggle for Aboriginal land and rights in the 21st century (In Black & White, Connor Court Publishing, 2013)
- Rolling Thunder: Voices Against Oppression (The Intervention 2013)

He has written extensively in academic journals on Indigenous rights, development and education, and contributed regular columns to The Tracker Magazine, as well as feature articles in Arena, Australian Doctor and the Griffith Review.
