= Tom E. Lewis =

Australian actor and musician (1958–2018)

- Born: Balang Lewis; 25 August 1958; Ngukurr, Arnhem Land, Northern Territory, Australia
- Died: 10 May 2018 (aged 59–60); Katherine, Northern Territory, Australia
- Occupations: Actor, musician, artistic director, arts and culture philanthropist

Tom E. Lewis (25 August 1958 – 10 May 2018), also known by his traditional name Balang Lewis, and sometimes credited as Tommy Lewis was an Aboriginal Australian actor, musician, and artistic director. His first major role was the title role in the 1978 Fred Schepisi film The Chant of Jimmie Blacksmith, and in 2006 he was the recipient of a Red Ochre Award from the Australia Council for the Arts. He released two albums: Sunshine After Rain (2005) and Beneath the Sun (2013), and was the founding director of Djilpin Arts in Beswick, Northern Territory.

== Early life ==
Balang Lewis, also known as Balang T.E. Lewis or Tom E. Lewis, was born on 25 August 1958 on the banks of the Roper River in Ngukurr, Arnhem Land, Northern Territory. His father was a Welsh stockman called Hurtle Lewis, who managed the cattle station his mother worked at. His mother, artist Angelina George, was of the Murrungun, Wandarrang, and Mara peoples. After Lewis' mother fell pregnant, his father left, and his mother fled to a mission to give birth and raise Lewis for the first seven years of his life. He was brought up in traditional culture in Arnhem Land.

When his mother remarried, the three of them relocated to a cattle station and his mother had four other children. At the age of 12, Lewis met his birth father for the first time in Borroloola. That same year, his stepfather died, and Lewis was forced to leave school, in order to support the family. He worked as a bricklayer and stockman, and then went to Belyuen in Darwin to work as an assistant motor mechanic. At the age of 17, with his boss's encouragement, Lewis applied to study motor mechanics at Melbourne’s Swinburne College, but his skills proved too advanced for the course.

Lewis was eventually talent-spotted at Melbourne Airport by Fred and Rhonda Schepisi, and was subsequently cast in the 1978 film The Chant of Jimmie Blacksmith.

== Career ==
=== Theatre ===
On 3 May 1985, Lewis appeared alongside Ernie Dingo, Richard Walley, Justine Saunders, and others in Bullie's House at Long Wharf Theatre, New Haven, Connecticut, United States.

From around 1989, he spent many years working in the Melbourne theatre scene, having worked with Playbox (later Malthouse), Melbourne Theatre Company, Melbourne Workers Theatre, and Handspan Theatres.

In 1997, Lewis acted in Up the Ladder, written by Roger Bennett and directed by Wesley Enoch, which toured Victoria and New South Wales.

With Handspan, he devised the internationally successful Lift 'Em Up Socks, a semi-autobiographical multi-media work that premiered in April 2000. He performed on stage with a marionette operated by Rod Primrose.

In May 2006, he played Othello at the Amphitheatre of the Museum and Art Gallery of the Northern Territory, in the Darwin Theatre Company's production of Shakespeare's classic directed by John du Feu.

In 2012, he starred alongside Helen Morse in Tim Winton's Signs of Life, a Black Swan Theatre / Sydney Theatre Company co-production, which toured Western Australia before a final performance in the Sydney Opera House.

In 2013, Lewis co-created, with Michael Kantor for Malthouse Theatre, a play titled The Shadow King, described as "an Indigenous version of King Lear". The play premiered at the Melbourne Festival in October 2013, before touring around the country, playing at Carriageworks for the Sydney Festival, Her Majesty's Theatre for the Adelaide Festival, and also in Perth, Katherine, Brisbane, and Darwin, all in 2014. In June 2016, the Malthouse Theatre production, directed by Kantor and with most of the original cast, was performed in the Barbican Theatre in London.

=== Film ===
The lead role in the Fred Schepisi's 1978 film The Chant of Jimmie Blacksmith was Lewis' first film role, after he had been spotted by casting director Rhonda Schepisi, wife of the director.

In 2007 he co-directed, with Julia Morris, a music video, Warrk Warrk (Black Crow), and in 2008 directed a short film, One River, All Rivers. Both were screened at the imagineNATIVE Film and Media Arts Festival in Toronto, Canada.

He co-wrote (with his wife Fleur Parry) a 25-minute documentary film, Yellow Fella, about his experience of coming from a mixed race heritage, for which he was awarded the 2005 Bob Maza Fellowship by the Australian Film Commission. Directed by Ivan Sen, it was selected to screen at the Cannes Film Festival, the first Australian Indigenous documentary ever chosen for Official Selection.

He had roles in We of the Never Never (1982), The Proposition (2005), and Crocodile Dreaming (2006), and played one of the leading roles in the psychological thriller Red Hill (2010). He was also in Goldstone, directed by Ivan Sen (2016). One of his last major acting roles was in Boori Monty Pryor's 2018 four-part comedy drama miniseries Wrong Kind of Black.

In 2014 the hour-long documentary film about the life of didgeridoo player David Blanasi, Kundirri: The Life and Legacy of David Blanasi was released by Djilpin Arts. The film was co-written by Lewis and his wife Fleur Parry, co-directed by Lewis and Julia Morris, and co-produced by Parry and Morris.

Finding Maawirrangga (2017) is a documentary short written by Lewis and co-directed by Dylan River Glynn McDonald. It was produced by Julia Morris, and executive produced by Fleur Parry, and screened at the 2017 Sydney Film Festival and 2018 Flickerfest. After his death in May 2018, it screened at the inaugural Northern Territory Travelling Film Festival in June of that year. The film tells of Lewis' return to his grandmother's country to learn his songlines, and in it he also relates how he contravened some cultural norms on stage.

His final movie role was in the documentary-drama The Skin of Others directed by Tom Murray, released posthumously in 2020 after Lewis had died during the making of the film. He played the lead role of Indigenous WW1 hero Douglas Grant, while also commenting on the state of Aboriginal and non-Aboriginal relations from his own personal perspective. A reviewer in The Guardian wrote: "...one leaves the film with a powerful impression of Lewis as an artist and an intellect; as a person fascinated by stories and compelled towards the process of artistic creation".

=== Music ===
Lewis played the didgeridu, flute, clarinet, and guitar. In the 1990s he toured in acclaimed jazz duo, Lewis & Young, through Europe, Asia, and Australia. He has played with Jane Rutter, Eve Duncan, Uli Klein, and composer George Dreyfus.

In 2005, he released the album Sunshine After Rain through label Skinnyfish Music. In 2013, he released Beneath the Sun, also through the Skinnyfish label.

He plays didgeridu on the albums Recorded Messages: Violin (2000), played by violinist Eve Duncan, and Ambient Voice (2001), with vocals by Dean Frenkel.

== Other activities ==
Lewis participated in the promotion of Melbourne's bid for the 1996 Olympic Games. In 2000 he ran with the Olympic torch in Melbourne.

== Personal life ==
Lewis was married to Fleur Parry, a theatre manager. They first met in the mid-1990s when both were involved in the Melbourne Fringe Festival. In 2000, when Parry was managing Handspan Theatre, Lewis walked in with an idea for a show. Before long, Parry was running the production, which toured Australia. A couple of years later, they became romantically involved. They were married and had a daughter together. Lewis also had other children.

In a 2007 interview, Lewis said that Northern Territory senator Bob Collins, who died a few days before he was due to face court on child sex abuse, had abused him as a child. He went through a period of alcohol abuse and estrangement from his family and community.

== Later life, death and legacy ==
Lewis, helped by his wife, reclaimed his life and cultural traditions, moving to Wugularr (Beswick) in South Arnhem Land, in 2001.

Together with his wife, Lewis founded a cultural foundation, the Djilpin Arts Aboriginal Corporation, which hosts the Walking with Spirits festival at Beswick Falls each year. Journalist Jeff McMullen, who was a long-time friend of Lewis, was patron of the Walking with Spirits festival. The organisation has been described "as one of his largest legacies".

Lewis died of a heart attack on 10 May 2018, at age 59, in Katherine, Northern Territory.

== Recognition ==
In 2000 Lewis was chosen to run with the Olympic torch in Melbourne.

A photographic portrait of Lewis by Juno Gemes was purchased by the National Portrait Gallery in Canberra in 2021. The description says: "The magnetic and charming personality which made Lewis such a compelling and successful actor is captured in Juno Gemes' portrait. With his leather jacket, white shirt and aviator sunglasses, Lewis invokes the feeling of James Dean as he poses against a wall papered with posters announcing upcoming gigs at the Sydney Trade Union Club in Surry Hills". Also held by the gallery is a photograph of an older Lewis, pulling a boat behind him, after "return[ing] to his grandmother's country to learn the songs of his ancestors". The photograph, taken by Philip Myers, was a finalist in the 2017 National Photographic Portrait Prize.

He was described in a Guardian article following his death as "a giant in the remote Arnhem Land community".

== Awards ==
Year	Nominated work	Award	Category	Result
2005	Yellow Fella	Bob Maza Fellowship		Won
2006	Sunshine After Rain	Northern Territory Indigenous Music Awards	Music Release of the Year	Won
2006	Tom E. Lewis	Red Ochre Award	Outstanding Indigenous Australian (Aboriginal Australian or Torres Strait Islander) Artist for Lifetime Achievement	Won
2008	One River, All Rivers	imagineNATIVE Film and Media Arts Festival	Honourable Mention	Won
2008	Warrk Warrk (Black Crow)	imagineNATIVE Film and Media Arts Festival	Best Music Video	Won (with Julia Morris)
2017	They Live in Forests, They Are Extremely Shy	Canberra Short Film Festival	Best Actor (International Category)	Won

== Filmography ==
=== Film ===
Year	Title	Role	Notes
1978	The Chant of Jimmie Blacksmith	Jimmie Blacksmith	Feature film
1982	We of The Never Never	Jackaroo	Feature film
1983	The City's Edge	Jack Collins	Feature film
1985	The Naked Country	Mundaru	Feature film
1987	Slate, Wyn & Me	Morgan	Feature film
1992	The Nun and the Bandit	Bert Shanley	Feature film
1995	Vacant Possession	Billy	Feature film
1995	The Life of Harry Dare	Harry's Father	Feature film
2005	The Proposition	Two Bob	Feature film
2005	Bad Habits	Bill	Short film
2005	Yellow Fella	Himself	Documentary film
2007	The Postman's Privilege	Sam	Short film
2007	The Curse	Narrator	Short film
2007	Spear	Narrator	Short film
2007	Crocodile Dreaming	Charlie	Short film
2007	September	Uncle Harold	Feature film
2010	Red Hill	Dural 'Jimmy' Conway	Feature film
2014	Kundirri: The Life and Legacy of David Blanasi		Documentary
2016	Waiting for Rain	The Drover	Short film
2016	Goldstone	Tommy	Feature film
2016	They Live in Forests, They Are Extremely Shy	David	Short film
2017	And Though the Music Ended, We Danced on Through the Night	Percy	Short film
2017	Finding Maawirrangga	Himself	Documentary short
2018	Australia: The Wild Top End	Narrator	Documentary short
2020	The Skin of Others	Douglas Grant	Documentary film

=== Television ===
Year	Title	Role	Notes
1979	Glenview High	Des Rowley	1 episode
1981	A Town Like Alice	Bourneville	Miniseries, 2 episodes
1983	Silent Reach	Ben Burnie	Miniseries, 2 episodes
1983	Carson's Law	Johnny Bryant	3 episodes
1985	Robbery Under Arms	Warrigal	TV movie
1988	Touch the Sun: Top Enders	Roy	TV movie series
1988–1991	The Flying Doctors	Ant / Tommy Baringa / Billy	3 episodes
1991	Rose Against the Odds	Koori #1	TV movie
1993	RFDS	Kilampi	2 episodes
1995	Correlli	Fred	Miniseries, 1 episode
1997	Kangaroo Palace	Koori	Miniseries, 1 episode
1997–1998	Li'l Elvis and the Truckstoppers	Dex Dexter	26 episodes
1998	The Micallef Program	Tommy	1 episode
2008	Double Trouble	Jimmy	13 episodes
2010	The Circuit	Father	1 episode
2017	Wolf Creek	Uncle Moses	1 episode
2018	Wrong Kind of Black	Dad	Miniseries, 4 episodes

=== As writer / director ===
Year	Title	Role	Notes
1991	Ratbag Hero	Didgeridoo	Miniseries
1992	The Nun and the Bandit	Musician	Feature film
2005	Yellow Fella	Co-writer	Documentary film
2007	Warrk Warrk (Black Crow)	Co-director	Music video
2008	One River, All Rivers	Director	Short film
2014	Kundirri: The Life and Legacy of David Blanasi	Co-writer / Co-director	Documentary
2016	Cleverman	Cultural Advisor	6 episodes
2017	Finding Maawirrangga	Writer	Documentary short
2020	The Skin of Others		Documentary film

== Theatre ==
=== As actor ===
Year	Title	Role	Notes
1985	Bullie's House	Mallawal	Long Wharf Theatre, Connecticut
1989	The Recruiting Officer	Servant	Playhouse, Melbourne with MTC
1989	The Old Familiar Juice	Stanley	Church Theatre, Melbourne with MTC
1989–1990	Our Country's Good	Aboriginal Australian / Black Caesar	Playhouse, Melbourne, Playhouse, Adelaide with MTC
1993	Dead Heart		NIDA Parade Theatre, Sydney
1994	Doing the Block		Fairfax Studio, Melbourne, with Arena Theatre Company for Next Wave Festival
1995	The Head of Mary	Yabari	Tokyo International Arts Space for Tokyo International Festival, Malthouse Theatre, Melbourne, with Playbox Theatre Company for Melbourne International Arts Festival
1996	Thumbul	Himself	Gasworks, Melbourne for City of Port Melbourne Recreation, Arts and Events
1997	Up the Ladder		Seymour Centre, Sydney, VIC regional tour with Melbourne Workers Theatre / Kooemba Jdarra Indigenous Performing Arts / Festival of the Dreaming, SOCOG
2000–2001	Lift 'Em Up Socks		Fairfax Studio, Melbourne, McGill University, Quebec, Brisbane Powerhouse, NT regional tour, David Williamson Theatre, Melbourne, Dietheatre Kunstlerhaus, Vienna with Handspan Theatre
2006	Othello	Othello	Museum and Art Gallery of the Northern Territory with Darwin Theatre Company
2008	Shakespeare and the Songmen of Arnhem Land	Singer	Royal Botanic Gardens Melbourne with Australian Shakespeare Company
2009	Muyngarnbi: Songs from Walking with Spirits		George Brown Darwin Botanic Gardens for Darwin Festival
2012	Signs of Life		WA tour & Sydney Opera House with Black Swan State Theatre Company / STC
2013–2016	The Shadow King	King Lear	Australian tour, Barbican Theatre, London

=== As writer ===
Year	Title	Role	Notes
1996	Thumbul	Playwright	Gasworks, Melbourne for City of Port Melbourne Recreation, Arts and Events
2000–2001	Lift 'Em Up Socks	Devisor	Fairfax Studio, Melbourne, McGill University, Quebec, Brisbane Powerhouse NT regional tour, David Williamson Theatre, Melbourne, Dietheatre Kunstlerhaus, Vienna with Handspan Theatre
2013–2016	The Shadow King	Co-creator	Australian tour, Barbican Theatre, London
