= The Nun and the Bandit =

- Directed by: Paul Cox
- Written by: Paul Cox
- Based on: novel by E. L. Grant Watson
- Produced by: Paul Ammitzboll; Paul Cox
- Starring: Gosia Dobrowolska; Chris Haywood
- Edited by: Paul Cox
- Production company: Illumination Films
- Release date: 1992
- Running time: 92 mins
- Country: Australia
- Language: English

The Nun and the Bandit is an Australian film directed by Paul Cox.

It was the first of two movies Cox made based on the novels of E.L. Grant Watson, the other being Exile.

== Plot summary ==
In the 1940s, two outlaw brothers kidnap their wealthy 14-year-old second cousin, but things get complicated when her chaperoning nun refuses to abandon her charge.

Michael Shanley looks after his brothers, Bert and Frank, the latter of whom is mentally handicapped. Michael asks his wealthy uncle George – who owns a mine – for help, but George refuses. Michael and his brothers decide to kidnap George's 14-year-old granddaughter and hold her for ransom. The little girl's aunt – a Polish nun visiting her sickly sister, the girl’s mother – gets caught up in the abduction as well.

Michael becomes obsessed with the nun and offers to return the kidnapped girl if the nun will give herself to him.

== Cast ==
- Gosia Dobrowolska as Sister Lucy
- Chris Haywood as Michael Shanley
- Victoria Eagger as Maureen
- Charlotte Hughes Haywood as Julie Shanley
- Tom E. Lewis as Bert Shanley
- Norman Kaye as George Shanley
- Scott Michael Stephenson as Frankie Shanley
- Robert Menzies as Richard Shanley
- Eva Sitta as Eve Shanley
- Tony Llewellyn-Jones as Clerk
- John Flaus as Police Commissioner
- Meg Caraher as Maid

== Original novel ==
The novel, which was set in Australia, was published in 1935. It was set in goldfields based on Kalgoorlie.

The novel was out of print but was republished by Paul Brennan. The Canberra Times wrote "Watson's characters are not well-developed and their dialogue is often stilted, as is often the case when fictional characters are made to bear the burden of the author's ideological or spiritual message."

== Production ==
Film rights were bought by Paul Cox, who read the novel while making Island in Greece. Cox said the book "fitted very closely with this whole idea of trying to find the balance between the inner and outer."

"It is time to get out of these claustrophic rooms we have always been operating in," said Cox. "It's time to see a bit of sky and embrace the landscape."

The film was made with finance from Film Victoria and the FFC. It was shot near Bacchus Marsh, Maldon in Victoria in early 1992.

== Release ==
According to Ozmovies:

Roadshow was the nominal domestic distributor but refused to release it. The film went straight to video, though it had a small theatrical release in Canada thanks to Alliance.

The film was screened at the short-lived Halls Gap Film Festival in the Grampians on Sunday, 8 November 1992, with Cox present, though it had also had a "world premiere" at the Melbourne Film Festival earlier in the year.

Cox called the movie "minimal filmmaking":

It's the very first time I read a book that I wanted to film, because I normally don't believe the film has much to do with the novel. I wasn't at the screening at the Melbourne Film Festival but I never want to screen a film at a festival again. That screening actually killed the release. It got bad reviews in a few places, so Roadshow wouldn't even release it. I think that as an Australian bush film, it is a very, very original film, a highly original piece. The forest, the beauty of the land, that's the altar, and the sacrifice is the innocence and youth. You have a sacrifice on an altar. But it gave me enormous satisfaction because the finished film is very nicely tuned, minimal when you look at the way it's crafted... But that's not what the reviewers want, a bush film like this. That's not very Australian, is it?

Variety wrote "Dobrowolska and Haywood give their usual standout performances. Kaye excels as the charmingly unscrupulous capitalist. Pic has very fine production values belying the modest budget."
