= Eustratios Georgiou Haritos =

Australian salt producer (1888–1974)

Eustratios Georgiou Haritos or Stratous Haritos (5 January 1888 – 25 September 1974) was a salt producer and storekeeper who spent much of his life in the Northern Territory of Australia.

== Early life ==
Haritos was born at Mytilene, on the Greek island of Lesbos, which was then controlled by Turkey. he is the sone of George and Despina Haritos and as a young man he worked on salt pans on the Turkish coast.

During the First Balkan War he served on the Greek army and served primarily in Bulgaria and was wounded in 1912 and spent a period of time at a hospital in Piraeus where a plate was inserted into his head. After he recovered he travelled to Port Said in Egypt where he worked as a powder monkey.

== Life in the Northern Territory ==
In November 1915 Haritos immigrated to Australia in search of work and arrived in Darwin where he was the first Greek immigrant to work at the Maranboy tin fields. Later in 1917 started working on the Fergusson River bridge, part of the infrastructure being built for the North Australia Railway. He later lumped coal on the Darwin wharf, worked in a local restaurant and in other odd jobs.

On 5 September 1917 he married Eleni (Ellen) Hermanis who was then 17 years old at the registry in Darwin and this was later followed by a Greek Orthodox service which was officiated by the Reverend Chrisandos Konstanindis who was not let licensed to marry people in the Northern Territory. The couple would go on to have eight children; four sons and four daughters. On 7 March 1924 he became and Australian citizen

In 1919 Haritos went intro business with a number of partners, including John Sphakanakis and Dick Colivas, to develop the salt pans around Ludmilla Creek, nearby to Ludmilla and, when established they sold to people around the Northern Territory including; Vestey's Meatworks. It appears that they were very successful and in 1931/1932 their pans yielded 150,000 kilograms (330,000 lb) of salt which was valued at £1200. In addition to the salt business Haritos and Ellen ran a farm with several hundred goats and chickens and grew peanuts and watermelons. Ellen sold eggs from their home and also had a contract with Darwin Hospital to provide them with eggs.

By 1940 Haritos had purchased a number of blocks of land in the Darwin CBD where, on one, he built a large grocery store which opened on 15 October 1940; it was called EG Haritos & Sons. After the Bombing of Darwin in 1942 Haritos evacuated from the area and joined Ellen who had settled in Mullumbimby for the remainder of the war where they farmed bananas.

The family returned to Darwin in January 1946 and reopened their store, which had been used by the army as a post office during the war, while other land he had owned was resumed by the government.

He died on 25 September 1974.
