= Maranboy =

Former tin mine in the Northern Territory

Coordinates: 14°32′S 132°47′E

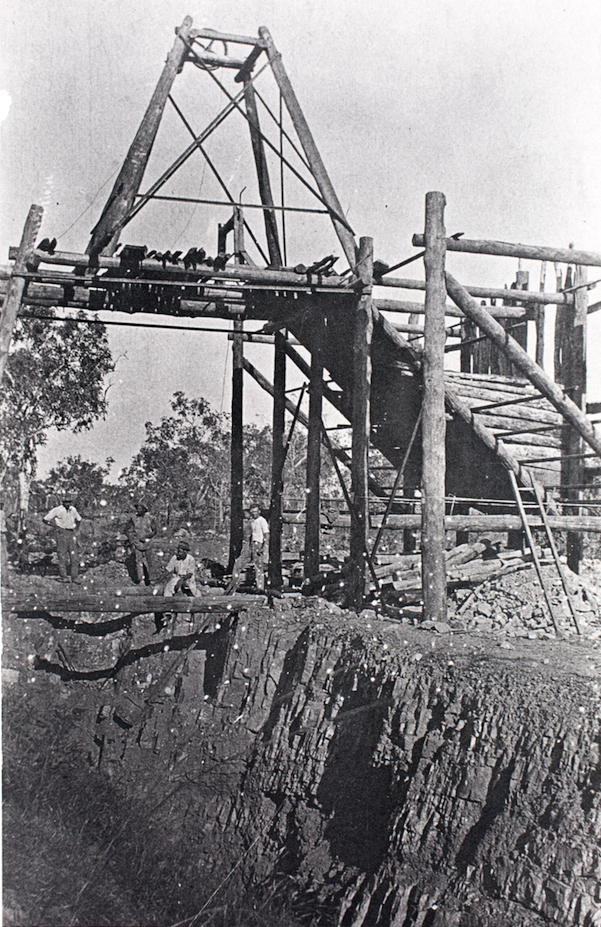
Maranboy tin mine

Maranboy is the location of a former settlement and tin mine near Barunga, about 70 kilometres east of Katherine in the Northern Territory of Australia.

== Establishment ==
Aboriginal people such as the Jawoyn have lived in the area surrounding Maranboy for thousands of years. At the time of European settlement in 1869 at Palmerston, now Darwin, many of the country's other mineral resources had already been exploited. Therefore, new mining opportunities accelerated development in the north.

Alluvial tin was found in the area by Tim O'Shea in 1910, a stockman from Pine Creek, but he never registered a claim. In September 1913, Maranboy was declared as a goldfield for a period of two years.

Tin was discovered at Maranboy in 1913 by prospectors Scharber and Richardson. Tin mines and a battery were operational in the same year.

In 1917, a small hospital, known as Penola Hostel, was established at Maranboy by John Flynn and the Australian Inland Mission. After its closure in 1931, the building remained in use as a Post Office and Police Station.

By 1918 the price of tin was booming.

The battery closed in 1949 for repairs but never reopened.

== Workers ==
Prospectors of European, Chinese and Aboriginal descent worked at Maranboy. One of these workers was Harold Snell, who later built many significant buildings in Darwin and another was Eustratios Georgiou Haritos who was the first Greek migrant to be employed there.

The battery closed in 1949 for repairs but never reopened.

Many of the Aboriginal people who serviced the mine returned to Beswick Creek (later Barunga).

== Police station ==
While little remains at Maranboy, the Northern Territory Police Force continues to operate an outpost at the site. The Maranboy police station has a patrol area of 23,000 km^{2} (8,900 sq mi) serving a number of large cattle stations as well as the communities of Barunga, Wulgularr (Beswick) and Manyallaluk.
