= Difference of Opinion =

- Presented by: Jeff McMullen
- Country of origin: Australia
- No. of seasons: 2
- No. of episodes: 32

Production
- Running time: 55 minutes (season one); 45 minutes (season two)

Original release
- Network: ABC1
- Release: 12 February 2007 – present

Difference of Opinion was an Australian television program produced and broadcast by ABC1. It began at the start of 2007, hosted, jointly, by ex-60 Minutes journalist Jeff McMullen and Warren Brown. It was a debating program.

Season 1 began on Monday 12 February 2007 and ran from 9:25 pm to 10:30 pm until Monday 7 May 2007. After a nine-week break, the program returned for its second season on Thursday 19 July 2007 running from 9:25 pm to 10:20 pm.

In 2008, the program was in some ways replaced by the similar ABC1 program Q&A.
