= Wardaman language =

Language isolate of Australia's Northern Territory

Wardaman
- Yangmanic
- Native to: Australia
- Region: Northern Territory
- Ethnicity: Wardaman, Dagoman, Yangman
- Native speakers: 50 (2016 census)
- Language family: Language isolate (Wagiman?)
- Dialects: Wardaman; Dagoman; Yangman

Language codes
- ISO 639-3: Variously: wrr – Wardaman dgn – Dagoman jng – Yangman
- Glottolog: yang1287
- AIATSIS: N35 Wardaman, N38 Dagoman, N68 Yangman
- ELP: Wardaman; Yangman
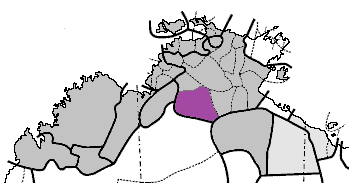
- Yangmanic languages (purple), among other non-Pama-Nyungan languages (grey)

Wardaman is an Australian Aboriginal language isolate. It is one of the northern non-Pama–Nyungan languages. Dagoman and Yangman were either dialects or closely related languages; as a family, these are called Yangmanic.

== Classification ==
Though previously classified as Gunwinyguan, the Yangmanic languages have not been demonstrated to be related to other languages.

The isolate Wagiman shares a very similar morphosyntactic profile with the Yangmanic languages, although they share very low cognacy rates (about 10% according to Stephen Wilson). Francesca Merlan supports its grouping together with Yangmanic, citing that both together differ from neighbouring languages (such as the Gunwinyguan language Jawoyn and Mangarrayi) while sharing very similar syntax with each other, such as their similar use of 'verbal particles'.

== Phonology ==
The phonological inventory of Wardaman proper:

=== Consonants ===
	Peripheral		Alveolo- palatal	Apical	
	Bilabial	Velar	Alveolo- palatal	Alveolar	Retroflex
Stop	b	ɡ	d̠ʲ	d	ɖ
Nasal	m	ŋ	n̠ʲ	n	ɳ
Lateral			l̠ʲ	l	ɭ
Flap				ɾ	
Approximant	β̞		j	ɹ̠	

The alveolo-palatals are pronounced with the blade of the tongue; at the end of a syllable they may sound like yn and yl to an English ear. Even the y is said to have lateral spread and to be pronounced with the blade and body of the tongue. There is very little acoustic difference between the two apical series compared to other languages in the area. The alveolars may add a slight retroflex onglide to a following vowel, and the retroflexes may assimilate alveolars in the same word. Nonetheless, they remain phonemically distinct. Francesca describes the w as bilabial, and notes that there is little or no lip rounding or protrusion (except in assimilation to a following /u/ or /o/). The r is post-alveolar.

=== Vowels ===
	Front	Back
High	i	u
Mid	e	o
Low	a	

== Vocabulary ==
Capell (1940) lists the following basic vocabulary items for Wadaman (Wardaman):

gloss	Wadaman
man	jibiwan
woman	baŋbun
head	ibam
eye	imum
nose	idunj
mouth	idjäga
tongue	djɛlin
stomach	nädjin
bone	wuːnɛ
blood	guräd
kangaroo	gaŋman
opossum	balan
emu	gumɛrindji
crow	wagwag
fly	galun
sun	ŋurun
moon	gandawag
fire	wudja
smoke	lujuŋgin
water	wian
