= Yangman =

Indigenous Australian people of the Northern Territory

The Yangman were an indigenous Australian people of the Northern Territory.

== Language ==
The Yangman language was closely related to Wardaman and Dalabon, and survives fragmentarily as passive knowledge among a few Mangarrayi people, descendants through intermarriage of Yangman who once worked at Elsey Station and around Mataranka. Jimmy Daniels (d.1986) was the last known fluent native speaker, though rather reluctant to think back in his mother-tongue, and left a record of some 500 words in interviews with the linguist Francesca Merlan.

== Country ==
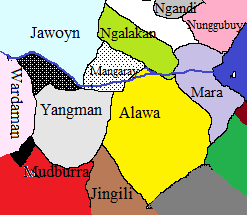
Traditional lands of the Aboriginal tribes in the Roper River area of the Northern Territory

In Tindale's estimation the Yangman's territory extended over some 5,600 square miles (15,000 km^{2}) covering basically the plateau terrain lying between the Roper and Victoria river systems. Its southern reaches extended to Elsey Creek, south of Mataranka, especially around Warlock Ponds, as far as Daly Waters. The Wardaman people lay to their west.

== Sources ==
- Merlan, Francesca (1994). A Grammar of Wardaman: A Language of the Northern Territory of Australia. Walter de Gruyter. ISBN 978-3-110-12942-7.
- Merlan, Francesca (1998). Caging the Rainbow: Places, Politics, and Aborigines in a North Australian Town. University of Hawaii Press. ISBN 978-0-824-82045-9.
- Tindale, Norman Barnett (1974). "Jangman (NT)". Aboriginal Tribes of Australia: Their Terrain, Environmental Controls, Distribution, Limits, and Proper Names. Australian National University Press. ISBN 978-0-708-10741-6. Archived from the original on 21 March 2018.
