= Phyllanthus subscandens =

Conservation status
- Least Concern (IUCN 3.1)

Scientific classification
- Kingdom: Plantae
- Clade: Embryophytes
- Clade: Tracheophytes
- Clade: Angiosperms
- Clade: Eudicots
- Clade: Rosids
- Order: Malpighiales
- Family: Phyllanthaceae
- Genus: Phyllanthus
- Species: P. subscandens

Binomial name
- Phyllanthus subscandens (Zoll. & Moritzi) Müll.Arg.

Varieties
- Phyllanthus subscandens var. subscandens

Synonyms
- Synonymy: Diasperus subscandens (Zoll. & Moritzi) Kuntze; Glochidion rubrum f. longistylis J.J.Sm.; Glochidion subscandens Zoll. & Moritzi synonyms of var. subscandens: Bradleia coronata Benth., nom. nud.; Bradleia rubra (Blume) Steud.; Bridelia glauca Benth., nom. nud.; Diasperus coronatus (Müll.Arg.) Kuntze; Diasperus leiostylus (Kurz) Kuntze; Diasperus wightianus Kuntze, nom. illeg. homonym. post.; Glochidion chademenosocarpum Hayata; Glochidion coronatum Hook.f.; Glochidion diversifolium (Miq.) Merr., nom. illeg. homonym. post.; Glochidion foliosum S.Moore; Glochidion fortunei Hance; Glochidion fortunei var. longistylum H.Keng; Glochidion fortunei var. megacarpum H.Keng; Glochidion grave S.Moore; Glochidion insulare Hook.f.; Glochidion leiostylum Kurz; Glochidion penangense (Müll.Arg.) Airy Shaw; Glochidion rubrum Blume; Glochidion suishaense Hayata; Glochidion thorelii Beille; Glochidion versicolor S.Moore; Phyllanthus diversifolius Miq.; Phyllanthus penangensis Müll.Arg.; Phyllanthus ruber (Blume) T.Kuros.

Species of tree

Glochidion insulare is a species of flowering plant in the family Phyllanthaceae. It is a shrub or tree endemic to tropical Asia, including southeastern China, Taiwan, the Ryukyu Islands, Cambodia, Myanmar, Thailand, Vietnam, and Malesia (Borneo, Java, the Lesser Sunda Islands, the Maluku Islands, Peninsular Malaysia, the Philippines, Sulawesi, and Sumatra). It grows in lowland tropical moist forests.
