= Handspan Theatre =

Handspan Theatre was a Melbourne-based puppetry and visual theatre company that operated between 1977 and 2002.

== History ==
Handspan Theatre was founded as a cooperative by Ken Evans, Andrew Hansen, Helen Rickards, Maeve Vella, Peter J. Wilson and Christine Woodcock in 1977.

Drawing upon influences in visual arts, choreography, ensemble theatre, film-making and academic education research, Handspan was created to explore alternative forms of puppetry to add to the booth, shadow puppet or marionette shows that were prevalent in Australia at the time.

Major Handspan works often utilised multimedia and readily filled conventional stages or more unusual site-specific spaces in their presentation. Other works offered a more intimate audience experience and were scaled to suit venues as diverse as shop front windows or a local swimming pool.

Handspan shows and those of many of their 1980s contemporaries (refer: Twyla Tharp & David Byrne Songs from the Catherine-wheel; Robert Wilson - Einstein on the Beach & La Claca - Miro) led to the creation of 'visual theatre' label - i.e. performance where visual spectacle (accompanied by silence or soundscapes) shared eminence with - and sometimes replaced - voiced text.

Artistic and business roles were often rotated amongst (though not exclusive to) the membership allowing for diverse professional development and load-sharing as part of the company's day-to-day business from the outset.

The company went on to incorporate around its collective model gathering a board of directors, festival and corporate sponsorship, substantial government funding and many more members over the next 25 years - either as ongoing core members or as contributing participants to the production process at any given time. An annual 'dreaming meeting' would serve as both a group-devised business plan and creative agenda for the next year.

A multi-level office studio space was found and developed (in the old 'Vardar Studios' a former photographic studio at 108 Gertrude St Fitzroy where they remained for 17 years from 1978. From there, Handspan fostered other artists work as shows in rehearsal, exhibitions, or as a 'build-to-order' collaboration. In 1995 when their building was sold, Handspan moved their studio and offices to Richmond, then finally in 1998 to join other major arts entities in the Southbank Arts Precinct.

Handspan earned several awards from touring the world stage, including at the 1983 Spoleto Festival, Italy for the astonishing multimedia work Secrets conceived by and devised with Nigel Triffitt. The founder of the Spoleto Festivals, composer Giancarlo Menotti, was so taken with the work during a visit to Melbourne, that he booked it for his festivals of two Worlds in Spoleto Italy (1983) and in Charleton USA (1984), where its success helped establish 3rd Spoleto Festival in Melbourne, (now renamed the Melbourne Festival).

Notable Handspan Theatre productions included:

- Nigel Triffitt's Secrets (1982 - 1986)
- Cho Cho San(1984): Original production written by Daniel Keene, directed by Geoff Hooke, designed by Ken Evans
- 4 Little Girls (1988 - 1996) adapted, devised and directed by Ariette Taylor, designed by Ken Evans, composer: Peter Crosbie
- Viva La Vida - Frida Kahlo (1993) written by Karen Corbett, directed by Angela Chaplin, designed by Ken Evans.

In June 2016, a comprehensive archive of the company - its history, its people and its productions and its pictures, was launched, created by Helen Rickards and Maeve Vella: Handspan Theatre: 1977 - 2002

== Books and articles ==
- Vella, Maeve; Helen Rickards (1989). Theatre of the Impossible: Puppet Theatre in Australia. Roseville, N.S.W: Craftsman's House. ISBN 0-947131-21-3.
