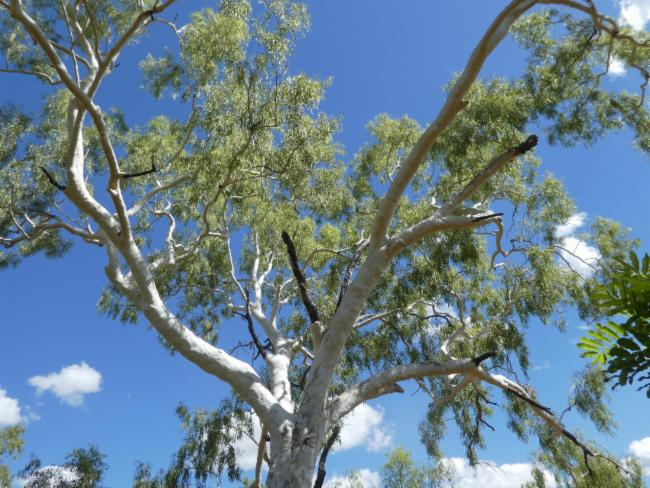
- Corymbia bella in Katherine

Scientific classification
- Kingdom: Plantae
- Clade: Embryophytes
- Clade: Tracheophytes
- Clade: Spermatophytes
- Clade: Angiosperms
- Clade: Eudicots
- Clade: Rosids
- Order: Myrtales
- Family: Myrtaceae
- Genus: Corymbia
- Species: C. bella

Binomial name
- Corymbia bella K.D.Hill & L.A.S.Johnson

Synonyms
- Eucalyptus bella Brooker

= Corymbia bella =

Ghost gum

Species of tree

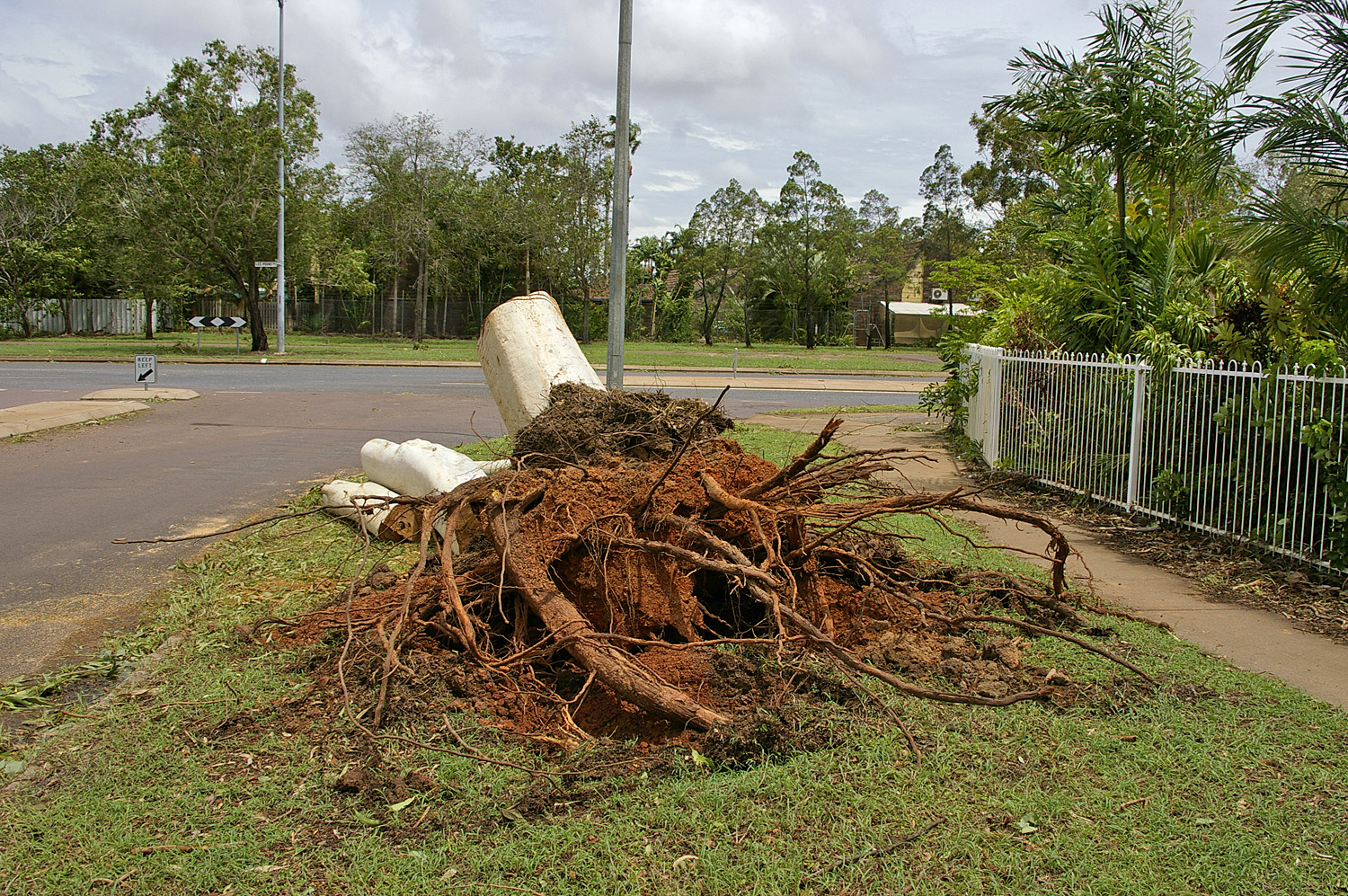
Uprooted C. bella from Cyclone Helen 2008

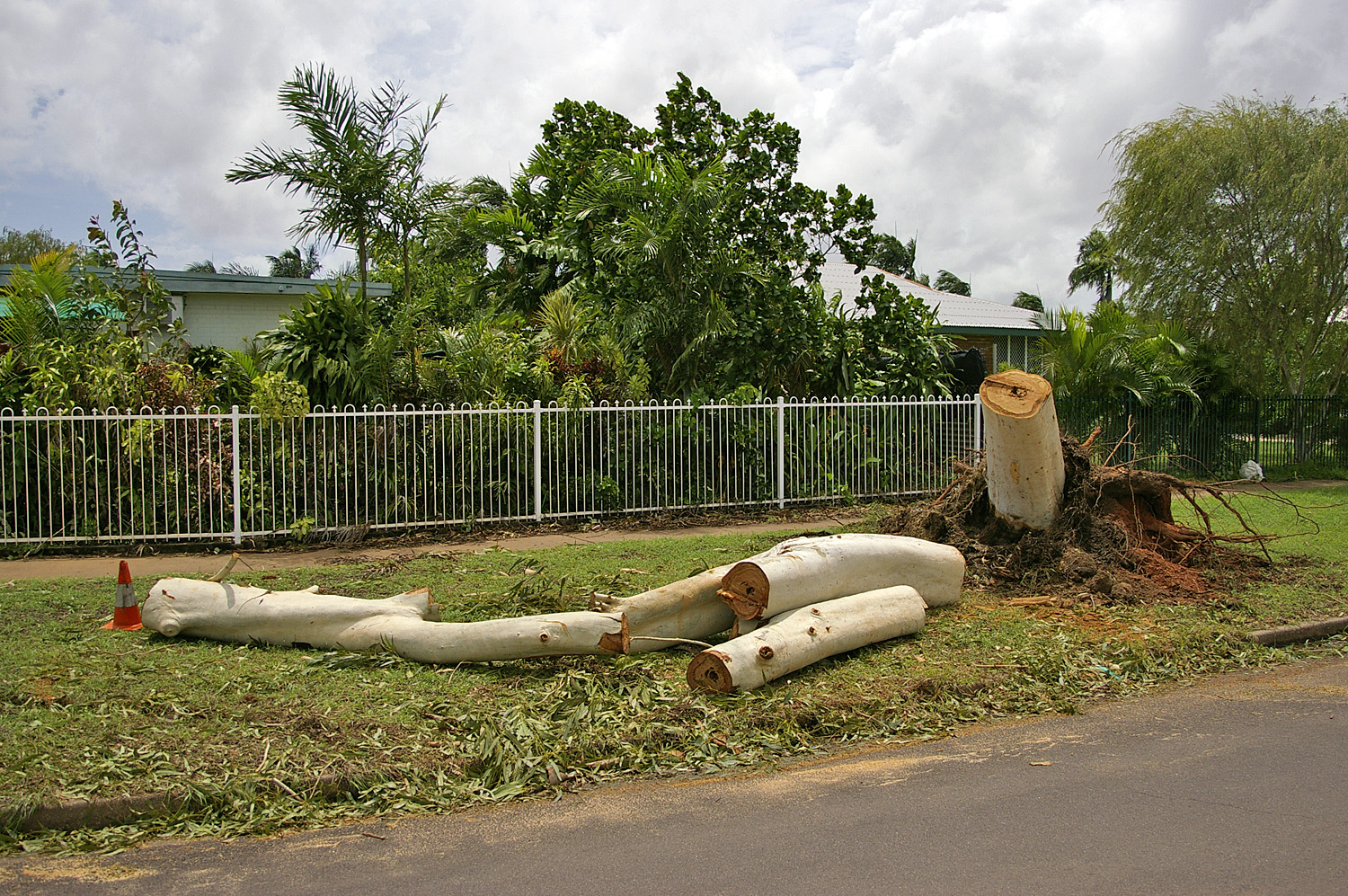
Sections of trunk

Corymbia bella, commonly known as ghost gum, weeping ghost gum, or paper-fruited bloodwood, is a species of tree that is endemic to northern Australia. It has smooth, powdery, white to pale grey bark, lance-shaped adult leaves, flower buds in groups of three, creamy white flowers and cup-shaped, barrel-shaped or urn-shaped fruit.

== Description ==
Corymbia bella typically grows to a height of 6 to 20 metres (20 to 66 ft), sometimes as tall as 30 metres (98 ft), and forms a lignotuber. It has smooth, powdery, white to pale grey bark that is shed in thin scales, occasionally with a small amount of thin, rough bark at the base. The branchlets are smooth and lack oil glands in the pith. Young plants and coppice regrowth have dull green, elliptical to lance-shaped leaves that are 65–110 mm (2.6–4.3 in) long and 17–30 mm (0.67–1.18 in) wide and petiolate. Adult leaves are mostly arranged alternately, occasionally in pairs, wavy, the same shade of green to slightly grey-green on both sides, lance-shaped, narrow lance-shaped or curved, 70–230 mm (2.8–9.1 in) long and 6–25 mm (0.24–0.98 in) wide, tapering to a petiole 5–21 mm (0.20–0.83 in) long. The flower buds are mostly arranged in leaf axils on a branched peduncle 1–9 mm (0.039–0.354 in) long, each branch with three buds on pedicels 1–5 mm (0.039–0.197 in) long. Mature buds are pear-shaped, 5–7 mm (0.20–0.28 in) long and 4–5 mm (0.16–0.20 in) wide with a rounded operculum. Flowering occurs between September and January and the flowers are creamy white. The fruit is woody cup-shaped, barrel-shaped or urn-shaped capsule 8–11 mm (0.31–0.43 in) long and 6–11 mm (0.24–0.43 in) wide with the valves enclosed in the fruit. The capsules are present on the tree in most months.

== Taxonomy and naming ==
Corymbia bella was first formally described in 1995 by Ken Hill and Lawrie Johnson from specimens collected 64.5 km (40.1 mi) north of Larrimah in 1998. The specific epithet (bella) is from the Latin word bellus meaning "beautiful", referring to the tree as a whole.

== Distribution and habitat ==
The range of C. bella extends from the Kimberley region of Western Australia across the Northern Territory and northern part of Queensland. It is common in monsoonal areas as far west as Broome and then along the Mitchell Plateau through to Kununurra and Derby. It is then spread across the top end of the Northern Territory from Top Springs to Pine Creek north to Darwin and spreading around the Gulf of Carpentaria. It is then found east from the border from Doomadgee to Cloncurry and Croydon and in the south west of the Cape York Peninsula as far as the lower part of the Mitchell River.

The tree prefers alluvial soils along low lying seasonally wet areas such as flood plains where it comprises part of the woodlands found in these locations. It is also commonly found along creek levees and the edge of swamps and lakes amongst melaleucas and also makes up part of savanah woodland at low point of the plains.

== Response to fire ==
The tree is able to form seeds after about 11 years. Following fire it will have an epicormic response and resprout shortly afterward. If the fire scorches all of the leaves the trees have a mortality rate of less than 30%.

== Use in horticulture ==
The tree is easily cultivated from seed and grows well in colder climates despite its origins. It is adaptable to most dry or moist well-drained soils in a sunny position and is regarded as hardy, drought and frost tolerant. Although seed can be planted at most times of the year in Australia it is best sown in spring or autumn in temperate climates. The optimum germination temperature for germination is around 18 to 22 °C (64 to 72 °F).

== See also ==
- List of Corymbia species
