= Wugularr, Northern Territory =

Wugularr
- Town
- Coordinates: 14.557°S 133.114°E
- Country: Australia
- State: Northern Territory
- LGA: Roper Gulf Region

Government
  - Territory electorate: Arnhem
  - Federal division: Lingiari

Population
  - Total: 542 (SAL 2021)
- Postcode: 0852

Wugularr (pronounced: woo-gah-larr), known previously by its English name Beswick, is a small community in the Northern Territory of Australia. Djilpin Arts is an Aboriginal corporation and art centre founded by actor and musician Tom E. Lewis, which holds the annual "Walking with Spirits" festival at the nearby falls each year.

== Location and naming ==
Wugularr (pronounced woo-gah-larr) is located 116 kilometres (72 mi) south-east of Katherine and 31 kilometres (19 mi) from the Barunga Community. Access is via a sealed road, the Central Arnhem Road. A permit from the Northern Land Council is usually needed to access the community.

The name is a Jawoyn language word that refers to the country where the land sits. The earlier name, Beswick, was adopted from the former pastoral lease of the area, known as Beswick Station. It was formally renamed in August 2024 by the request of the Bagala (Jawoyn) people, who are its traditional owners.

== History ==
A DC-3 (Dakota) belonging to the Dutch Air Force crash-landed near Beswick (or Beswick Creek, now Barunga?) in 1947. All passengers survived, with four crew travelling about 100 miles (160 km) down the Katherine River to get help. After running out of food they killed one of two dogs they had with them. The wings were eventually removed and the remains of the plane were towed to Katherine.

== Attractions ==
The waterfall known as Malkgulumbu (formerly Beswick Falls) is nearby, generally accessible only with a guide.

Djilpin Arts is a community-owned, not-for-profit cultural centre founded by actor and musician Tom E. Lewis around 2001, after moving back on country with his wife Fleur Parry, and is regarded as his greatest legacy. It houses the Blanasi Collection, a permanent exhibition of culturally significant artworks in the West Arnhem painting style created by dijeridu master, David Blanasi, held in the centre since 2008. The centre also sells art created by local artists. The collection was begun in 1996, when a group of senior artists and elders, led by Blanasi (who was also a painter), wanted to showcase the art and culture of their community. Over 50 of the paintings intended for the collection were destroyed in floods in 1998; the 38 paintings on canvas survived because they happened to be in a touring exhibition that was in Darwin at the time. There are 12 of Blanasi's artworks, which are all large acrylic paintings on canvas using intricate cross-hatching that tell the stories of his Mayali clan.

Also founded by Lewis is the annual "Walking with Spirits" festival, organised by Djilpin Arts and held at Malkgulumbu / Beswick Falls in July each year since 2002. The road is a dirt road, requiring a four-wheel drive vehicle, and camping is allowed on site for the weekend. No alcohol is allowed. At the festival, the Wulugarr community share their songs, stories, dance, and music.

In 2015, the 15th edition of the festival was presented by Djilpin Arts in partnership with the Australian Shakespeare Company, whose artistic director Glenn Elston had met Lewis in 2003 and had started the tradition. At this edition, the local Billabong Boys performed, and traditional corroborees from around Arnhem Land were performed.

In 2017, Coloured Stone performed at the festival, and invited Emily Wurramara on stage with them. Musicians from Fiji, New Zealand, Papua New Guinea, and Timor were also invited. This was the last festival directed by Tom E Lewis, before his death the following year.

== In media and popular culture ==
The community has had books published about local stories.

In 2014 the hour-long documentary film about David Blanasi, Kundirri: The Life and Legacy of David Blanasi, was released. The film was co-written by Tom E. Lewis and his wife Fleur Parry, co-directed by Lewis and Julia Morris, and co-produced by Parry and Morris. The Documentary Australia Foundation, which funded the film, wrote: "The current day thread of the storyline is set in Beswick/Wugularr, home of Blanasi and now once again a healthy and active community. Since his disappearance in 2001 from a dysfunctional and unhealthy Beswick, the community, with the drive of Tom E. Lewis... and his wife Fleur Parry have worked hard to rebuild a place that is active in cultural, artistic and community life. The filming coincides with the 10th annual Walking with Spirits Festival participants in Djilpin Arts, where the presence of Blanasi's legacy is always felt".

The NITV children's television show Barrumbi Kids was filmed there in 2021.
