= Barunga, Northern Territory =

Barunga
- Town
- Coordinates: 14°31′15″S 132°51′54″E
- Country: Australia
- State: Northern Territory
- LGA: Roper Gulf Region

Government
  - Territory electorate: Arnhem
  - Federal division: Lingiari

Population
  - Total: 313 (2011)
- Postcode: 0852

Barunga, formerly known as Beswick Creek and then Bamyili, is a small Aboriginal community located approximately 80 kilometres (50 mi) southeast of Katherine, in the Northern Territory of Australia. It is part of the Roper Gulf Region local government area. At the 2011 census, Barunga had a population of 313.

In mid June each year, the Barunga Festival, a three-day event showcasing Australian Aboriginal culture, is held. At the 1988 event, the Barunga Statement, which requested a treaty between the Australian federal government and Indigenous Australians (Aboriginal and Torres Strait Islander peoples), was presented to then prime minister Bob Hawke. Just before the 2018 Festival, the Barunga agreement was signed between the Northern Territory Government and all four land councils.

== History ==
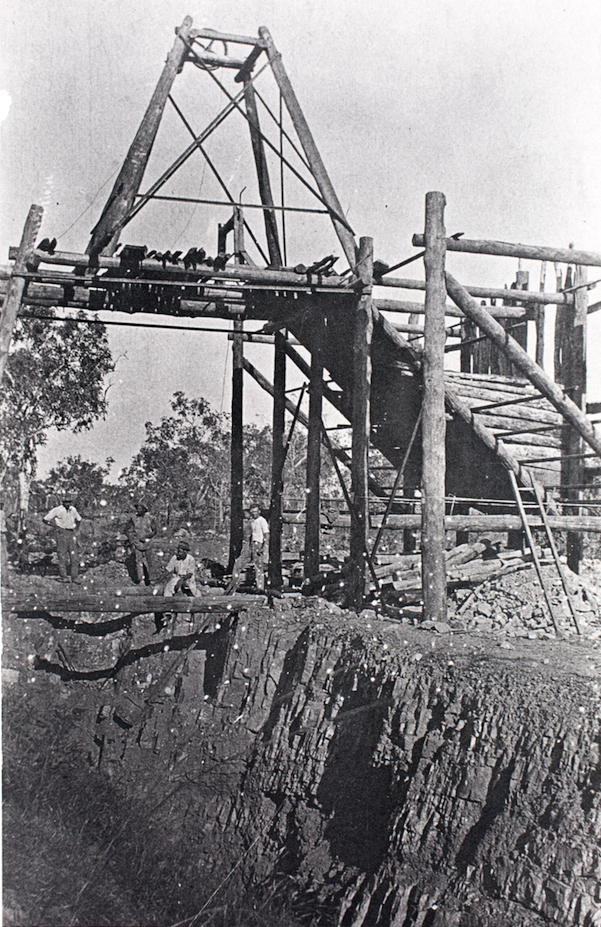
Tin mine at Maranboy

Aboriginal people have lived in Barunga and the surrounding region for thousands of years.

=== Maranboy tin mine ===
In September 1913, a goldfield named Maranboy was declared for a period of two years. Maranboy was located 8 kilometres (5.0 mi) from where Barunga is today.

Tin was discovered at Maranboy in 1913 by prospectors Scharber and Richardson. Tin mines and a battery were operational in the same year. Prospectors of European, Chinese and Aboriginal descent worked at Maranboy. The mine closed in 1949 for repairs but never reopened. Many of the Aboriginal people who serviced the mine returned to Beswick Creek.

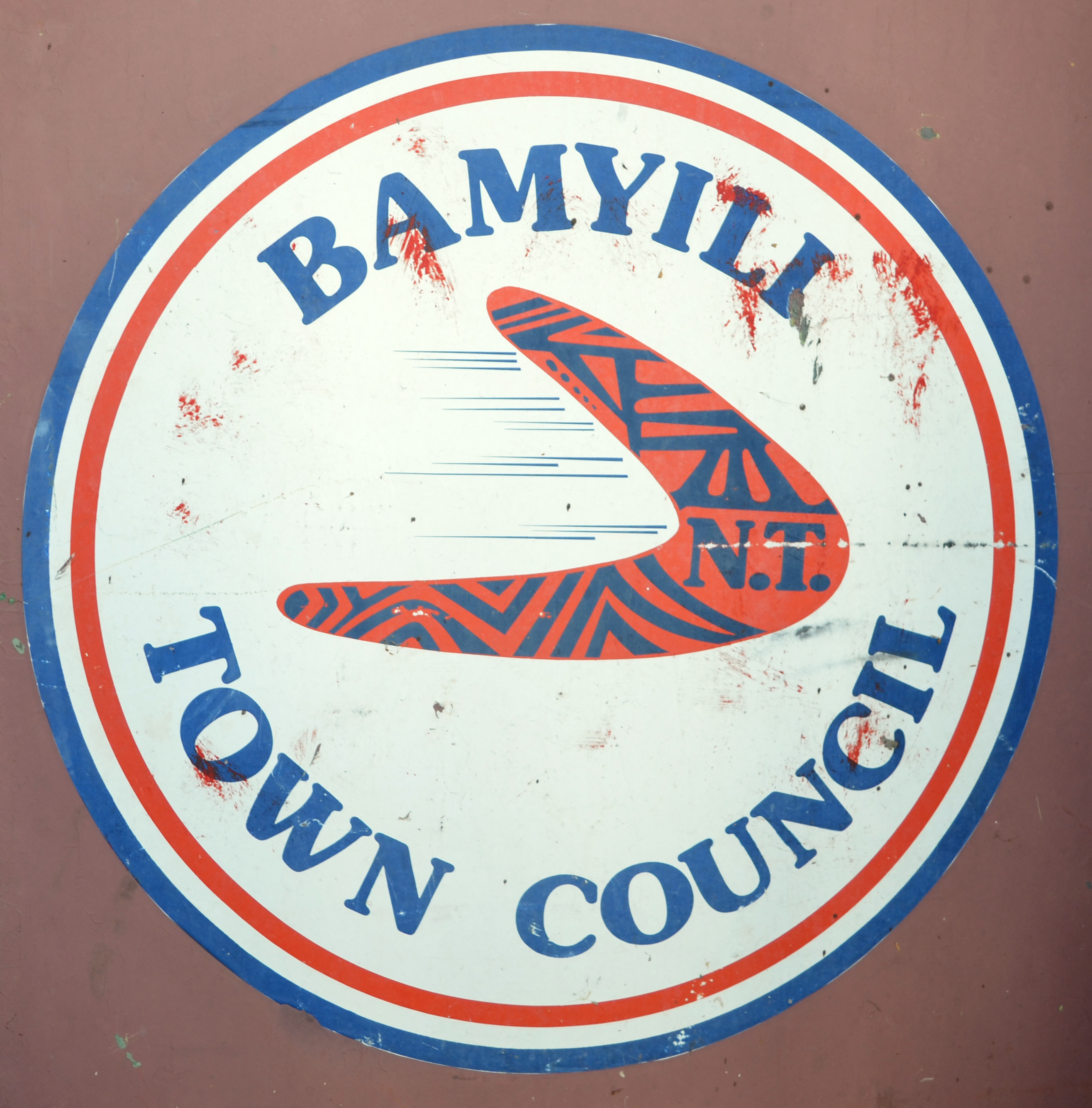
Bamyili Town Council

=== Plane crash nearby ===
A Douglas DC-3 belonging to the Dutch Air Force crash-landed near Beswick Creek or Beswick (now Wugularr) in 1947. All passengers survived, with four crew travelling about 100 miles (160 km) down the Katherine River to get help. After running out of food they killed one of two dogs they had with them. The wings were eventually removed and the remains of the plane were towed to Katherine.

=== Tandangal ===
The Tandangal Native Settlement (from Jawoyn language dangdangdal), also known as the Eight Mile Settlement, was established in 1947, located about 13 kilometres (8.1 mi) from Beswick Station. The local people were not consulted about the choice of location nor the method of their removal to the settlement from the King River Compound.

In 1948, the Beswick community moved to Tandangal (sometimes known as "old Bamyili"), because of risk of flooding from recent heavy rains. An influenza epidemic spread through the community in May 1951.

In June 1951 the people were relocated to the new site, initially known as Beswick Creek Native Settlement, and Tandangal was condemned.

=== Back to Beswick ===
By November 1951 the flu had killed seven people.

In early 1951, the Northern Territory Government started to develop the Beswick Creek community, building basic housing infrastructure and creating some minor employment opportunities. Local farmers also employed Aboriginal people, even running a peanut farm at Beswick Creek. The farm only lasted a few years. As Beswick grew, new groups formed a camp on the other side of the river known as "The Compound" where the people made humpies.

=== 1950s to present ===
The Barunga school was first opened in 1954 with 42 children enrolled.

The elders changed the name of "The Compound" to Bamyili in 1965. In 1984, it changed its name to Barunga.

In 1985 the Barunga Festival was first held. In 1988, the Barunga Statement was presented to the prime minister at the event.

== Facilities ==
Barunga School provides education for students from preschool to the middle years, with up to Year 12 supported by the NT Open Education Centre. As of 2020, the school is developing links with Wugularr and Bulman schools through the Vocational Education and Training (VET) program.

The Bagala Community Store opened in September 2017, after local women raised the need for good food at affordable prices. It is the only store in the NT entirely owned and operated by Indigenous people. it stocks fresh produce and other foods, as well as hardware, mechanical goods, small electrical appliances as well as major appliances.

The community has a health clinic, camping grounds, sports oval, basketball courts, softball pitch and council office.

== Barunga Festival ==
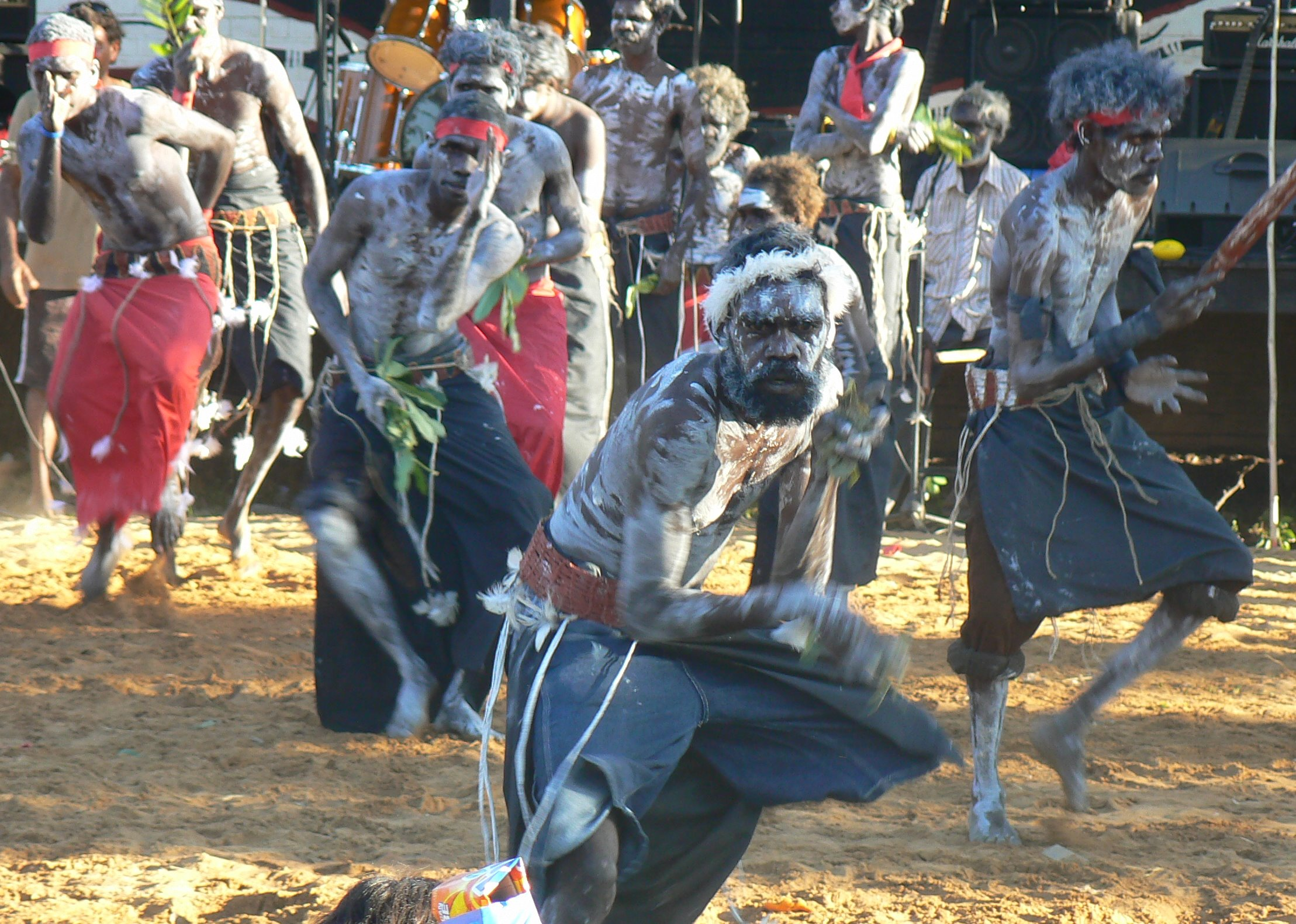
Performance at Barunga Festival 2008

Bangardi Robert Lee (1952–2005), a leader of the Bagala clan of the Jawoyn people, initiated the Barunga Sport and Cultural Festival in 1985. It became an important forum for sharing ideas, showcasing the Aboriginal Australian and Torres Strait Islander cultures and talent, and to engage with social and political issues.

It has become an annual music and cultural celebration, held on the Queen's Birthday long weekend (second weekend) in June attracting over 4,000. It features a program of workshops, dancing ceremonies, traditional bush tucker-gathering, didgeridoo-making, basket weaving and musical performances and sport.

In 2018, popular Tiwi band B2M played at the festival.

The 2020 festival was postponed from June to September, then cancelled due to the COVID-19 pandemic. The 2021 event went ahead as scheduled on 11–13 June.

== Barunga Statement (1988) and the Barunga agreement (2018) ==
The Barunga Statement was presented to then Prime Minister of Australia Bob Hawke on 12 June 1988 at the Barunga Festival. It demands the recognition of Land Rights and a treaty.
