= Francesca Merlan =

Australian anthropologist

Francesca Cordelia Merlan is an American-born Australian anthropologist whose research focuses on Indigenous-settler relations, social transformation, land claims, gender, and linguistic documentation. in northern Australia, Papua New Guinea, and Germany. She is professor emeritus of Anthropology at the Australian National University (ANU) and Fellow of the Academy of the Social Sciences in Australia. In 2003 she was awarded the Centenary Medal from Department of Prime Minister and Cabinet, Australia.

== Education and career ==
She completed her MA and PhD in anthropology at the University of New Mexico in 1975, conducting doctoral research on Native American and settler communities in the North American Plains.

In 1976, Merlan was awarded a research grant from the Australian Institute of Aboriginal Studies, bringing her to northern Australia for fieldwork that lasted from 1976 to 1979.

She joined the Australian National University as Professor of Anthropology in 1995 and has since been appointed professor emeritus. She has held a visiting fellowship at the Institute of Advanced Study, Princeton (2015–16).

== Scholarly works ==
Merlan's research focuses three geographic regions. In northern Australia, she has investigated the effects of Aboriginal people's movement into regional towns; Indigenous-settler relations; Aboriginal languages, socio-cultural significance and land claims. Her book Caging the Rainbow: Places, Politics and Aborigines in a North Australian Town (1998), which examined the lives of Aboriginal people in Katherine, Northern Territory.

Her later book Dynamics of Difference in Australia: Indigenous Past and Present in a Settler Country (2018) investigated relations between Indigenous and non-Indigenous Australians from first contact to the present.

Her co-authored work Ku Waru: Language and Segmentary Politics in the Western Nebilyer Valley, Papua New Guinea (1991) examined segmentary sociality, language, and politics.

Her other works include Mangarayi (1982), Ngalakan Grammar, Texts, and Vocabulary (1983) and A Grammar of Wardaman (1993).
