= Jatbula Trail =

Walking trail in the Northern Territory of Australia

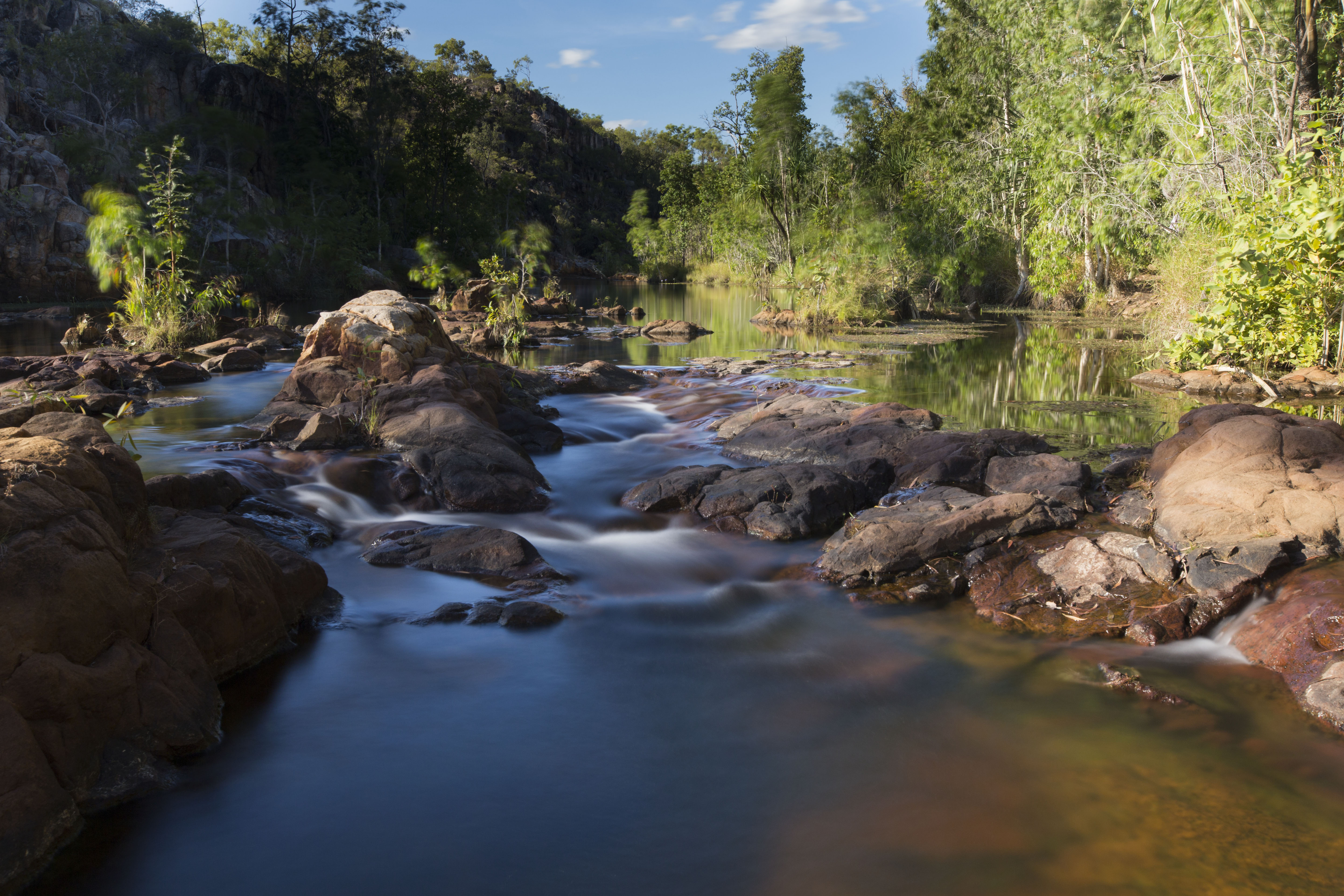
- Length: 62 km (39 mi)
- Location: Northern Territory, Australia
- Trailheads: Nitmiluk Gorge, Edith Falls
- Use: Hiking
- Difficulty: Grade 4
- Season: Winter
- Months: June to September
- Sights: sandstone plateau, monsoon forests, waterholes, cascades
- Hazards: Dehydration, Snakes, Hyperthermia
- Maintained by: Parks and Wildlife Commission of the NT
- Website: https://nt.gov.au/leisure/parks-reserves/plan-your-visit/bushwalking-hiking/nitmiluk-national-park-jatbula-trail

The Jatbula Trail is a 62 kilometres (39 mi) one-way walking trail in the Northern Territory of Australia. It starts at Nitmiluk Gorge in Nitmiluk National Park and finishes at Edith Falls (Aboriginal Jawoyn language: Leliyn).

The Trail follows the route travelled by generations of Jawoyn people between the Gorge and Edith Falls. It is named after Peter Jatbula, a Jawoyn man who was instrumental in securing land rights for his people and who walked this route with his family. Members of Peter Jatbula’s family still live in the area today and continue to help look after "Country".

From the standpoint of Australia's indigenous people, the word "Country" speaks to the custodial relationship and responsibility that they have towards the landscape around them. It is a rich heritage in which "culture, nature and land are all linked".

== Path ==
Map of Nitmiluk National Park, showing the trail

The trail terrain consists of sandstone plateau scrub, woodlands, monsoon forests and riverine landscapes along the Western Arnhem Land escarpment. The Trail is marked by blue triangles, usually located every 20 to 50 metres. There are overnight camp sites at Biddlecombe Cascades, Crystal Falls, 17 Mile Falls, Sandy Camp and Sweetwater Pool. Each is near a spring or cascade.

== Management ==
Bookings are essential and the number of walkers on each section of the track is restricted. With the exception of SweetwaterPool, the last campsite, overnight stays at the campsites are mandatory, making the entire trek either five or six days (four or five nights).

== Reviews ==
According to visitors, the trail passes through spectacular landscapes and there is swimming available at each campsite. Sights include rivers lined by paperbark trees, spinifex grasslands and monsoon forests featuring palm trees and ferns.
