= Katherine District Hospital =

Geography
- Location: Katherine, Northern Territory, Australia
- Coordinates: type:landmark 14°26′20″S 132°16′20″E

Organisation
- Care system: Public Medicare (AU)
- Type: District

Services
- Emergency department: Yes
- Beds: 60

Helipads
Number	Length		Surface
Number	ft	m	Surface
1			bitumen

Links
- Website: Official Website
- Lists: Hospitals in Australia

Katherine District Hospital is a district public hospital servicing the Katherine Region in the Northern Territory, Australia. It is located 3 km (1.9 mi) from the centre of town on the banks of the Katherine River, overlooking Knott's Crossing. It services an area of 336,674 km^{2} (129,991 sq mi). Around 85% percent of its patients are Aboriginal people, many from some of the most remote communities in Australia. It is operated by the Northern Territory Government Department of Health.

The hospital has been evacuated due to water inundation during the floods in 1998, 2006, and twice in 2026, leading to pressure from the Katherine Town Council on the Territory Government to relocate the hospital to higher ground, at an estimated cost of $50 million.

== Services ==
The hospital provides a 24-hour emergency department as well as general medical and surgical wards, an operating theatre, a maternity ward, 18 bed children's ward, pathology laboratory, a radiography department equipped to perform basic x-ray, ultrasound, CT scans and a renal unit. Pharmacy and specialized outpatient services are also accessible.

The renal dialysis unit open in May 2000, providing an option for ongoing treatment for kidney disease. The facility accommodates the local Jawoyn people by providing local care which was previously only available in Darwin, forcing patients to relocate.

The hospital employs Aboriginal liaison and support officers and is regularly visit by specialists from Darwin. The Northern Territory Aeromedical Service offers patient retrieval and transfer to Royal Darwin Hospital, the region's tertiary referral hospital from a base in Katherine. The hospital maintains a small academic library.

== Statistics ==
In the 2011-2012 financial year, Katherine District Hospital conducted 440 elective surgeries and handled 14,311 Emergency Department presentations. Waiting times in the emergency department were varied from the national average, with shorter waits for urgent treatments according to the Australian Government's My Hospital website with 69% of patients treated with 30 minutes. Elective surgeries were not compared, but the median waiting time for urgent cases was 15 days.
