= Hibbertia oblongata =

Scientific classification
- Kingdom: Plantae
- Clade: Embryophytes
- Clade: Tracheophytes
- Clade: Spermatophytes
- Clade: Angiosperms
- Clade: Eudicots
- Order: Dilleniales
- Family: Dilleniaceae
- Genus: Hibbertia
- Species: H. oblongata

Binomial name
- Hibbertia oblongata R.Br. ex DC.

Species of plant

Hibbertia oblongata is a species of flowering plant in the family Dilleniaceae and is endemic to northern Australia. It is an erect to spreading shrub with scaly foliage, elliptic to oblong leaves, and yellow flowers usually arranged singly in leaf axils, with 16 to 36 stamens arranged in bundles around the two carpels.

== Description ==
Hibbertia oblongata is an erect to spreading shrub that typically grows to a height of up to 1.5 m (4 ft 11 in) and has its foliage covered with branched, bundled hairs. The leaves are elliptic to oblong, 15–50 mm (0.59–1.97 in) long and 5–15 mm (0.20–0.59 in) wide and sessile or on a petiole 2.6 mm (0.10 in) long. The flowers are arranged singly, sometimes in groups of up to five, in leaf axils along the branches on a peduncle 5.5–10.8 mm (0.22–0.43 in) long, with elliptic, lance-shaped or oblong bracts 2.4–4.8 mm (0.094–0.189 in) long. The five sepals are joined at the base, the two outer sepal lobes 2.2–3.2 mm (0.087–0.126 in) wide and the inner lobes 3.5–4.2 mm (0.14–0.17 in) wide. The five petals are egg-shaped with the narrower end towards the base, yellow, up to 13.7 mm (0.54 in) long and there are 16 to 36 stamens arranged in groups around the two scaly carpels, sometimes with staminodes, each carpel with two ovules.

== Taxonomy ==
Hibbertia oblongata was first formally described in 1817 by Augustin Pyramus de Candolle in his Regni Vegetabilis Systema Naturale from an unpublished description by Robert Brown. The specific epithet (oblongata) means "oblong-like".

In 2010, Hellmut R. Toelken described four subspecies in the Journal of the Adelaide Botanic Garden, and the names are accepted by the Australian Plant Census:

- Hibbertia oblongata subsp. brevifolia (Benth.) Toelken (previously known as H. oblongata var. brevifolia Benth. has elliptic to bracts and leaves that are more or less the same colour on both surfaces;
- Hibbertia oblongata subsp. macrophylla Toelken has egg-shaped bracts and 30 to 36 stamens;
- Hibbertia oblongata subsp. megalanthera Toelken has egg-shaped bracts and 18 to 22 stamens;
- Hibbertia oblongata R.Br. ex DC. subsp. oblongata Toelken has elliptic bracts and the upper surface a darker shade of green than the lower surface.

== Distribution and habitat ==
- Subspecies brevifolia usually grows in sandy soil in woodland or scrub on sandstone outcrops in the Northern Kimberley and Victoria Bonaparte biogeographic regions of Western Australia and the Top End of the Northern Territory.
- Subspecies macrophylla grows in forest or scrub in sheltered rock formations between Gunbalanya and Edith Falls on the western escarpment of Arnhem Land in the Northern Territory.
- Subspecies megalanthera occurs along the western escarpment of the Arnhem Land plateau where it usually grows in sandy soil in sheltered places between large sandstone outcrops;
- Subspecies oblongata grows in sandy soil, often in rock formations and is found in north-eastern Arnhem Land and on the off-shore island of the Northern Territory.

== Conservation status ==
Hibbertia oblongata subsp. brevifolia is classified as "not threatened" by the Western Australian Government Department of Parks and Wildlife and all four subspecies are listed as of "least concern" under the Territory Parks and Wildlife Conservation Act 1976.

== See also ==
- List of Hibbertia species
