= Ivan Ivanetz =

Australian peanut farmer (1897–1977)

Ivan Antonovitch Ivanetz (31 March 1897 – 1977), also known as "Long John", was a farmer who lived in Katherine in the Northern Territory for much of his life.

== Biography ==
Ivanetz was born near Poltava, in the Ukraine, where he lived until the family moved to Omsk in Russia in 1910. In Omsk his father farmed wheat on 1,000 acres (400 ha) newly available farm land.

In 1918 and during World War I, and after completing his education, Ivanetz joined the White Army, then under the command of Alexander Kolchak. During his period of service he was wounded three times, was twice promoted for military valour and was awarded the medal of Vladimir, Class IV (Military Division).

In 1922 Ivanetz was forced to cross the Chinese border and spent two years in Manchuria and a further four years in Shanghai before deciding to immigrate to Australia in 1927. Upon arrival in Townsville Ivanetz attempted to get work in the surrounding cane fields but struggled to find work as he was suffering with illness. In 1929 he received a loan from a fellow Russian migrant and persuaded a truck driver to take him, and nine others, to Katherine where they worked completing the North Australia Railway in the region.

After the railway was completed Ivanetz, along with a John Fomin (another Russian migrant), took up farm land along the Katherine River with the lease being obtained in 1929. They were helped by Nicholas Droojin and Paul Zueff and, in their first season, they had to clear and plant the block in a month before Wet season begun. Here they farmed peanuts and lived in basic tent accommodations.

In 1936 Ivanetz travelled to Harbin in China, where he met and married Nadia Pascoe. In 1937, when they returned to Katherine he was in sole possession of the farming block and he became a naturalised Australian citizen.

In 1939 Ivanetz attempted to move away from peanuts, for which he had to request government permission, by planting cotton but floods washed away the seed. Then, during World War II, when most other civilians were evacuated, he remained on his farm and grew vegetables and citrus fruits which he sold to the army. During this period he employed many Aboriginal people to keep the farm running. In around 1943 his wife, who was initially evacuated, also returned to assist.

After the war Ivanetz and Pascoe divorced and Ivanetz begun farming peanuts again until the mid-1960s when he left the farm.

Ivanetz died in 1977.
