= Yinberrie Hills Important Bird Area =

Protected area in Australia

Coordinates: 14°05′30″S 132°07′51″E

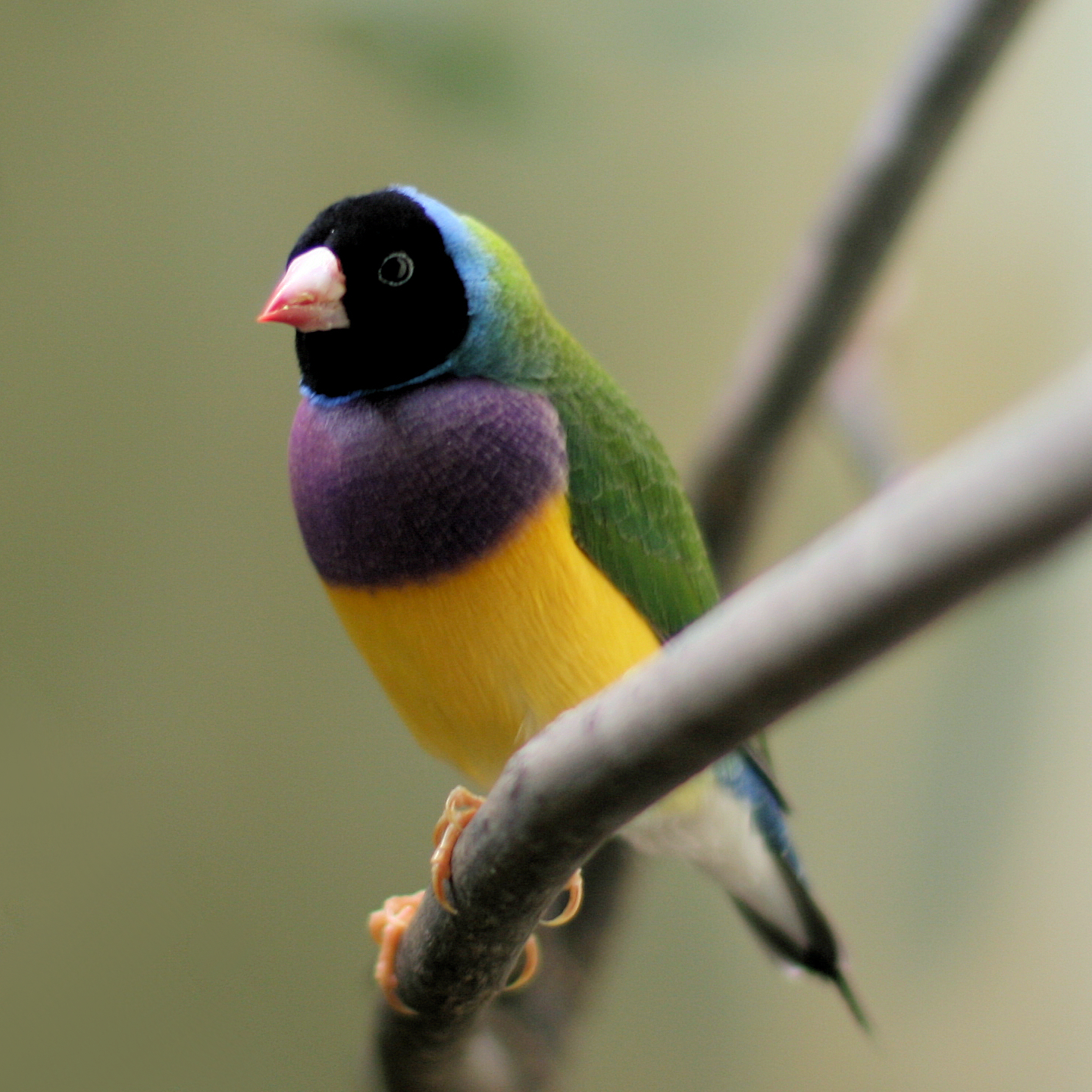
The IBA supports a population of endangered Gouldian finches

The Yinberrie Hills Important Bird Area comprise some 1050 km^{2} of rocky, tropical savanna covered, wooded hills in the lower Top End of the Northern Territory of Australia. They lie 45 km north of the town of Katherine, and about the same distance south of Pine Creek. The site is important for Gouldian finches.

== Description ==
The site is bounded by Nitmiluk National Park and the Arnhem Land Plateau in the east. It consists of rolling hills with thin, sandy loam soils overlaid by angular cobbles. The hills are covered by smooth-barked eucalypts with an understorey of native grasses. They are drained by a network of ephemeral streams which retain water through the dry season in small, scattered pools. Mean annual rainfall in the area is about 1000 mm, falling mainly from December to March. Key features of the habitat for the finches are that the lack of grazing, and few extensive hot fires, allow native grasses to seed; the persistent waterholes provide drinking water; the cavity-bearing trees provide nesting sites; and the perennial grasses on the adjacent lowlands provide seed during the wet season. Land tenure is primarily Aboriginal freehold land held by the Barnjarn Aboriginal Corporation and Wagiman Aboriginal Land Trust.

== Birds ==
The site has been identified as an Important Bird Area (IBA) by BirdLife International principally because it is home to a population of endangered Gouldian finches. It also supports chestnut-backed buttonquails, bush stone-curlews, varied lorikeets, northern rosellas, hooded parrots, white-gaped, yellow-tinted, bar-breasted and banded honeyeaters, masked and long-tailed finches, and silver-crowned friarbirds. Other birds occasionally recorded from the IBA include the Australasian bittern, partridge pigeon, yellow-rumped munia and the northern subspecies of the crested shrike-tit.
