= Acacia sericoflora =

Scientific classification
- Kingdom: Plantae
- Clade: Tracheophytes
- Clade: Angiosperms
- Clade: Eudicots
- Clade: Rosids
- Order: Fabales
- Family: Fabaceae
- Subfamily: Caesalpinioideae
- Clade: Mimosoid clade
- Genus: Acacia
- Species: A. sericoflora

Binomial name
- Acacia sericoflora Pedley
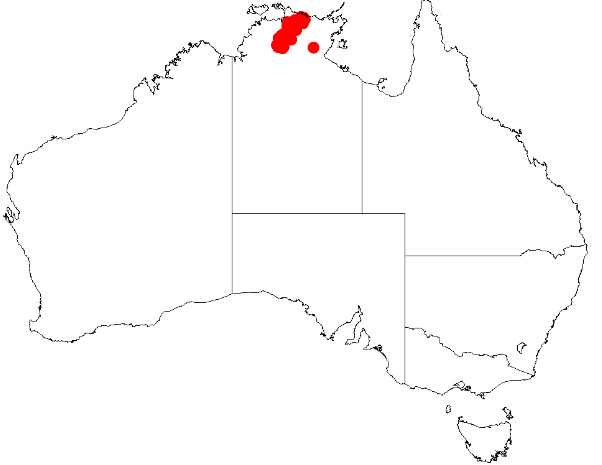
- Occurrence data from AVH

Species of legume

Acacia sericoflora is a shrub or tree belonging to the genus Acacia and the subgenus Juliflorae that is native to northern Australia.

== Description ==
The tree or shrub typically grows to a height of 3.5 m (11 ft) and has smooth bark that is rougher at the base. The stout and angular branchlets are grey in colour and densely covered in silky hairs. Like most species of Acacia it has phyllodes rather than true leaves. The flat and straight, elliptic to narrowly elliptic phyllodes have a length of 12 to 19 cm (4.7 to 7.5 in) and a width of 8 to 35 mm (0.31 to 1.38 in) and thinly coriaceous. The phyllodes have two prominent main veins free to the base. It blooms between June and July producing yellow flowers. The flower-spikes are sparsely arranged along a length of 2 to 4.5 cm (0.79 to 1.77 in). Following flowering linear shaped seed pods form that are coiled and twisted and have a width of around 3 mm (0.12 in). The seeds inside are arranged longitudinally and are around 4 mm (0.16 in) in length.

== Distribution ==
The species has a limited range within western Arnhem Land and within the boundaries of Kakadu and Katherine Gorge National Parks between Gunbalanya and Edith Falls in the Northern Territory where it is found on escarpments and along creek lines growing in clay or sandy soils as a part of woodland or scrubland communities composed of species of Eucalyptus, Melaleuca and Triodia.

== See also ==
- List of Acacia species
