= Acacia helicophylla =

Scientific classification
- Kingdom: Plantae
- Clade: Tracheophytes
- Clade: Angiosperms
- Clade: Eudicots
- Clade: Rosids
- Order: Fabales
- Family: Fabaceae
- Subfamily: Caesalpinioideae
- Clade: Mimosoid clade
- Genus: Acacia
- Species: A. helicophylla

Binomial name
- Acacia helicophylla Pedley
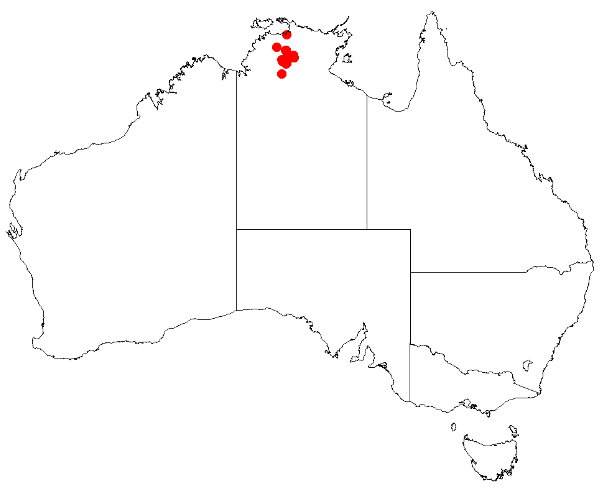
- Occurrence data from AVH

Synonyms
- Racosperma helicophyllum (Pedley) Pedley

Species of legume

Acacia helicophylla is a species of flowering plant in the family Fabaceae and is endemic to the top end of the Northern Territory, Australia. It is a sticky shrub with minni ritchi bark, narrowly oblong to elliptic, wavy or spirally twisted phyllodes, spikes of yellow flowers and narrowly oblong, thinly leathery pods.

== Description ==
Acacia helicophylla is a sticky shrub that typically grows to a height of up to 4 m (13 ft) and has grey or red-brown to blackish minni ritchi type bark that peels in strips. Its branchlets are densely hairy with soft hairs pressed against the surface and irregular bands of resinous tissue. Its phyllodes are narrowly oblong to elliptic or lance-shaped with the narrower end towards the base, and wavy or spirally twisted, mostly 50–125 mm (2.0–4.9 in) long and 6–30 mm (0.24–1.18 in) wide with a fine dark point up to 3 mm (0.12 in) long on the tip. There are six to eight hairy longitudinal veins and leaf edges and a prominent midvein. The flowers are yellow and borne in one or two spikes 15–35 mm (0.59–1.38 in) long in axils. Flowering occurs between March and August and the pods are narrowly oblong, 25–70 mm (0.98–2.76 in) long, 5–8 mm (0.20–0.31 in) wide, thinly leathery and sometimes slightly constricted between the seeds. The seeds are elliptic, inflated, 4.5–5.7 mm (0.18–0.22 in) long, dark brown with small, round bumps that are often paler than the rest of the seed, and surrounded by a pale halo.

== Taxonomy ==
Acacia helicophylla was first formally described in 1974 by the botanist Leslie Pedley in Contributions from the Queensland Herbarium from specimens collected by Norman Byrnes in Katherine Gorge National Park in 1968. The specific epithet (helicophylla) means 'coiled leaves'.

== Distribution and habitat ==
This species of wattle grows among rocks on sandstone cliffs and steep hillsides in sandy soils. It is restricted to a small area in Nitmiluk National Park between Katherine Gorge and Gunlom Falls in the tropical parts of the Northern Territory.

== Conservation status ==
Acacia helicophylla is listed as of "least concern" under the Northern Territory Territory Parks and Wildlife Conservation Act.

== See also ==
- List of Acacia species
