= Nadia Pascoe =

Australian peanut farmer (1915–2018)

Nadia Pascoe (16 September 1915 – 1 July 2018) was an Australian farmer who lived in Katherine in the Northern Territory for much of her life.

== Biography ==
Pascoe was born in Estonia, which was then part of Russia and, at some part of her early life she moved to Harbin in China, where she married her first husband Ivan Ivanetz. Together they moved to Nagasaki in Japan and then on to Thursday Island in Australia before travelling to Darwin and settling in Katherine where she arrived in 1936. Ivanetz had owned a farm there, on the river, since 1929. The couple farmed peanuts there and lived in a 'primitive' tin shed with an ant-bed floor where they raised two children. Katherine was then somewhat of a 'Russian colony' where many Russian immigrants settled following the Russian Civil War.

During World War II, and the Bombing of Darwin, Pascoe was evacuated to Alice Springs (Mparntwe), via a train to Birdum and then a truck. They travelled from there to Adelaide where she spent the next year where she received significant assistance from the Australian Inland Mission. Ivanetz was one of only three farmers who remained behind.

Pascoe then returned to Katherine, while the war was still very much underway, to help her husband on the farm. To support the war effort the pair grew vegetables which they sold to the army; they also sold them pork and chickens. Pascoe had her third child, born at the military hospital there, in 1945.

After the war Pascoe and Ivanetz divorced and Pascoe married Fred Pascoe, who was also a peanut farmer, and moved to his property up river. Pascoe had a further four children with her second husband. They sold the farm in 1966 and moved into the township of Katherine and, later, to Adelaide.

Pascoe died on 1 July 2018 at a nursing home in Adelaide.

== Collections ==
Pascoe recorded an oral history with Library & Archives NT in 1987 (NTRS 226 TS 471) and they also hold a collection of photographs which she took of Katherine and the farm between 1943 and 1963 (NTRS 1646).
