= Jim Zimin =

Australian peanut farmer (1902–1974)

Innokentiy Temofeevech "Jim" Zimin (26 November 1902 – 31 August 1974) was a Russian-born Australian peanut farmer. He was born in Sretensk, Siberia, Russia and died in Katherine, Northern Territory, Australia. Zimin designed and built his own peanut digger, which was to receive, in 1949, the first agricultural patent awarded to a resident of the Northern Territory.

== Life ==
Zimin was born on 26 November 1902 in Sretensk, Siberia, in the Russian Empire, the son of Tomefoy Nikolaevisch Zimin. Following the Russian Civil War he moved to Harbin, China and was trained as a chauffeur and mechanic at the Young Men's Christian Association.

Zimin emigrated to Australia, arriving first in Brisbane, in 1927 where he found employment in Queensland; in 1929, he acquired government land meant for peanut farming near the Adelaide River, and founded I. T. Zimin & Co. with five Russian partners. Their operations received little funding and harvesting was manual; while successful, the venture ceased in 1930, whereupon Zimin relocated to Katherine. He became a naturalised Australian citizen in 1934.

Three years later, he bought a plot of land near the Katherine River; and following another three years, he acquired a peanut farm on the riverbank. He briefly experimented with growing miller and cotton but ultimately returned to peanuts. Within two years, Zimin's germination seed was reportedly the best locally and, following a petition made in 1938 to the Minister of the Interior about the lack of quality seed, his seed was recognised as being the best quality and fresh seed was made available from his farm.

During World War II most people were evacuated from the area but Zimin remained and began farming for the army troops and supplied the army with tomatoes, cabbages, watermelons and pumpkins. In 1942 the 121/101 Australian General Hospital was built on a portion of his land and he began providing food for the hospital as well. In exchange for the use of his land Zimin received water from the Army. During this period he was assisted by a number of Aboriginal workers.

In 1949 Zimin received the first ever agricultural patent awarded to a Northern Territory resident for his own peanut digger.

After the war Zimin was faced with dwindling demand and weather fluctuations, crop disease (including Crown Rot) and which were capped by a flood in 1957. In 1949 Zimin received the first ever agricultural patent awarded to a Northern Territory resident for his own peanut digger. He started working for the CSIRO and sold off most of his land by 1971.

He died on 31 August 1974 in Katherine and was buried in the local cemetery. He never married.

== Legacy ==
On 30 July 1982 a stretch of the Stuart Highway was renamed Zimin Drive, in his honour.
