= Kensington Pride =

Mango cultivar

Mangifera 'Kensington Pride'
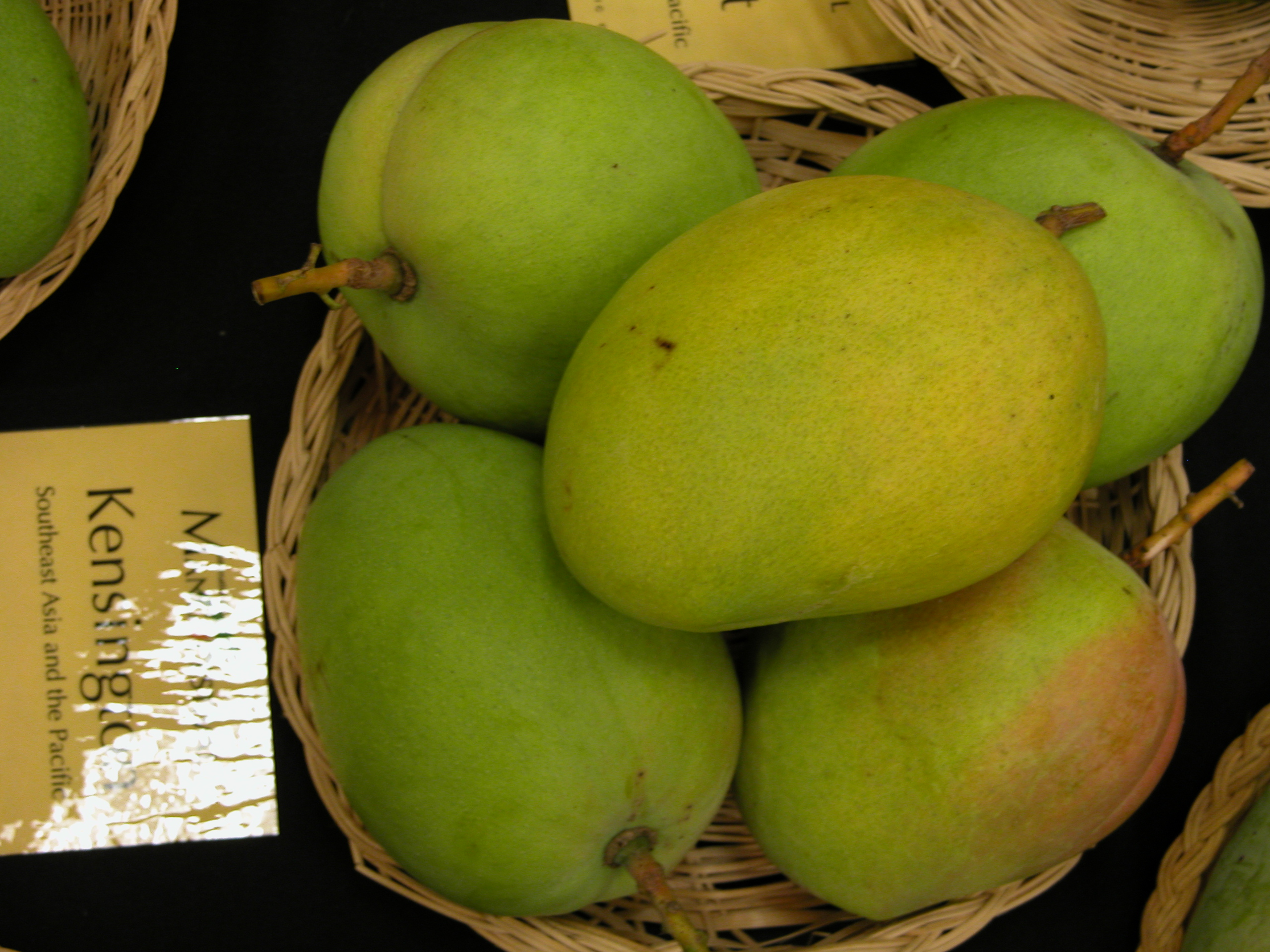
- Display of 'Kensington' mango at the 15th Annual International Mango Festival at the Fairchild Tropical Botanic Garden in Coral Gables, Florida
- Genus: Mangifera
- Species: Mangifera indica
- Cultivar: 'Kensington Pride'
- Origin: Australia

The 'Kensington Pride' mango is a named commercial mango cultivar that originated in Australia. It is sometimes called the KP, Bowen or Bowen special. It is Australia's most popular mango, accounting for over 80% of the country's annual commercial mango market. It is considered to have a distinctive flavour and aroma when compared with the Florida-bred cultivars grown by most mango-exporting countries.

In Australia, commercial Kensington Pride mangoes grow predominantly in the Northern Territory and northern and central Queensland, providing early (September–November) and late season (December–February) mangoes respectively. Some late-season fruit are from the Kununurra region in Western Australia. Very few commercially available fruit come from south-east Queensland or northern New South Wales, and fruit from these latitudes is generally of lower quality.

== History ==
The original tree emerged in Bowen, Queensland in the late 1880s (although the fruit was not formally described until the 1960s), where it was given the name "Pride of Bowen" and "Bowen Special". It was possibly brought to Bowen from India between 1885 and 1889 by traders who were shipping horses for military use in India. The polyembryonic nature of the fruit suggests a south east Asian origin, although the shape and colour are very similar to Indian cultivars suggesting a possible hybrid.

Whatever the origin, one story states that a particular specimen was given to a Bowen Harbour and Customs Officer, GE Sandrock, who planted the seeds on his property. As the trees grew, Sandrock selected the seeds of the better fruits and passed them on to a Mr McDonald for his own plantings. From these plantings Mr Harry Lot, another local farmer, selected a particularly good variety and started his own small orchard on Adelaide Point, near Bowen. The resulting fruit was popular in the local markets and named after the original property: ''Kensington'. Other farmers acquired their own specimens and the fruit spread throughout the Bowen region.

Kensington Pride was recognized for its flavor and became the most widely grown commercial mango in Australia, and remains so today despite the introduction of other varieties. It is grown widely in the tropical and sub-tropical regions of the country. Kensington Pride was also introduced to the United States via Florida, where it is sold on a limited-basis as nursery stock for home growing. Kensington trees are planted in the collections of the USDA's germplasm repository in Miami, Florida, the University of Florida's Tropical Research and Education Center in Homestead, Florida, and the Miami–Dade Fruit and Spice Park, also in Homestead.

== Description ==
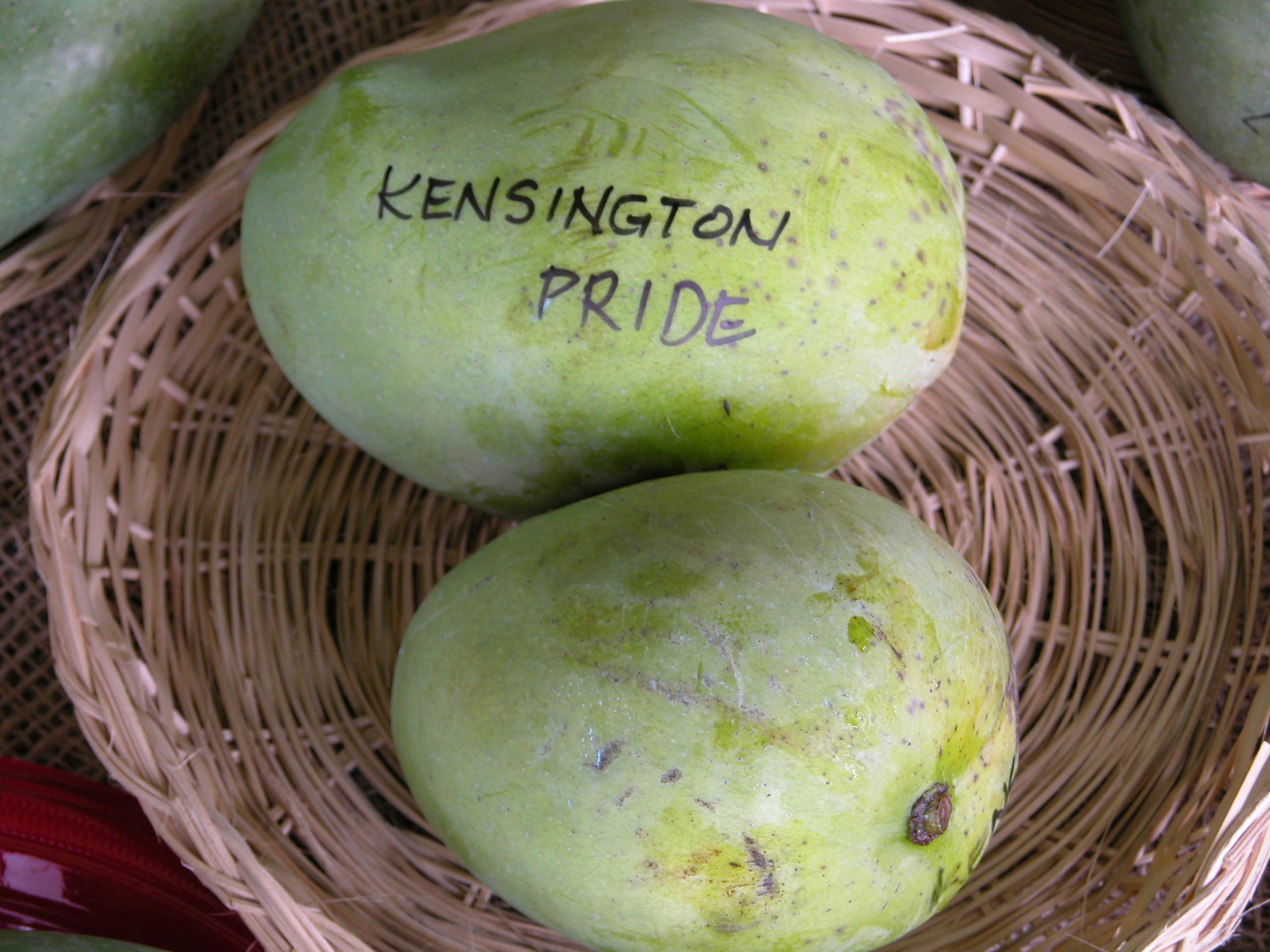
Display of Kensington Pride mangoes at the Tropical Agricultural Fiesta in the Fruit and Spice Park in Homestead, Florida.

The fruit average around a 500 grams in weight at maturity. They are ovate in shape and have a rounded apex, generally lacking a beak. The skin color is yellow, developing some red blush. The flesh is yellow, with moderate fiber, and has a sweet and spicy flavor. The fruit contains a polyembryonic seed, meaning that two seedlings emerge from one seed.

== Production ==
The fruit usually ripens from mid-September to March in Australia depending on the region it is grown, but has been known to ripen as early as August in the Northern Territory. They typically ripen in July in Florida, USA. Kensington fruit production is considered moderate and inconsistent in Australia, with fruit having moderate disease resistance. The cultivar is exceptionally erratic, with wide year-on-year variation in fruit output and quality.

In Australia, the mango season spreads southward from September through February. The mango season begins near Darwin and Katherine late September and ends by early December. Queensland varieties (from such locations as Mareeba, Dimbulah, Townsville, Bowen and Yeppoon) enter the market around this time and persist on the market well into January. In the 1990s and 2000s, the number of mangoes coming from the Northern Territory has increased substantially.

Trees are moderately vigorous growers and can reach heights over 8 metres (25 feet) if left unpruned.
