= Bombing of Katherine =

1942 Japanese attack on Australia

Coordinates: 14°26′42″S 132°16′19″E

- Part of Japanese air raids on Australia
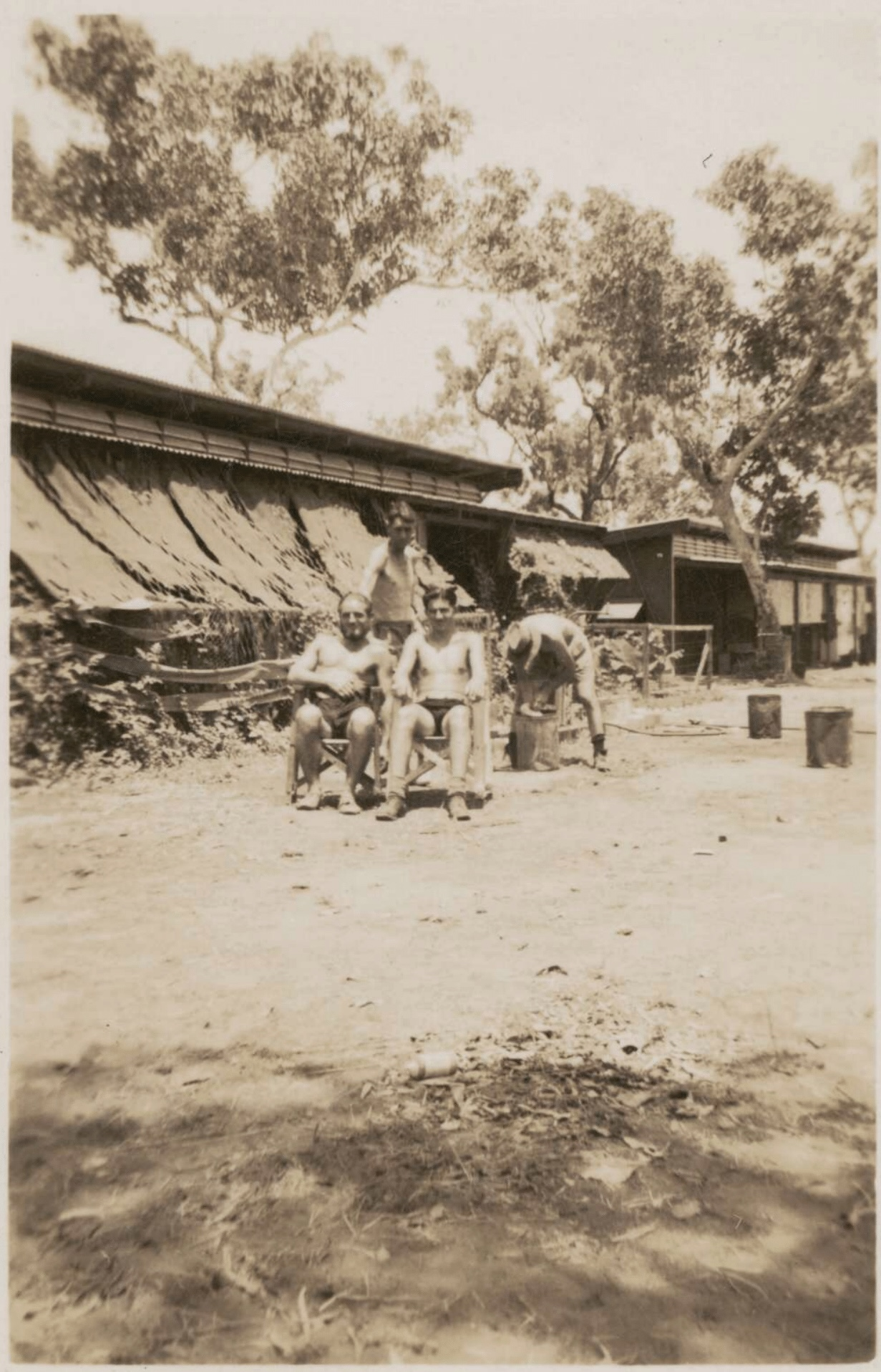
- Off-duty military personnel outside accommodation, Katherine, Northern Territory c. 1942
Date	22 March 1942; 84 years ago
Location	Katherine, Northern Territory, Australia
Result	Japanese victory

Belligerents
Japan	Australia

Commanders and leaders
(Empire of Japan) Tokao Kokutai	Unknown

Strength
9 aircraft bombers	Unknown

Casualties and losses
None reported	1 killed 1–2 wounded

The Bombing of Katherine was a Japanese air attack on the town of Katherine, Northern Territory, conducted on 22 March 1942. As part of the Japanese air raids on Australia, it marked the southernmost point reached by air raids in the Northern Territory.

Following the Bombing of Darwin, nine Mitsubishi G4M1 "Betty" bombers of the Imperial Japanese Navy under Tokao Kokutai dropped approximately 90 high-explosive bombs known as "Daisy Cutters" on Katherine's airfield.

The raid resulted in one fatality, an Indigenous man named Dodger Kodjalway, and one or two injuries.

Wing Commander Shane Smith described the raid's legacy:

While damage to infrastructure was limited and just one life lost, the attack changed Katherine in many ways and it continues to impact people's lives to this day.
