= Jawoyn =

Australian Aboriginal people living in the Northern Territory

The Jawoyn, also written Djauan, are an Australian Aboriginal people living in the Northern Territory of Australia. The Bagala clan are of the Jawoyn people.

== Language ==
Jawoyn, known as Kumertuo, is a non-Pama–Nyungan language that belongs to the Macro-Gunwinyguan group of languages of Arnhem land. (It has recently been established that the Gunwinyguan and Pama-Nyungan languages are both branches of a proto-Macro-Pama–Nyungan language.) At one time, Kumertuo was a group of several closely related spoken dialects, but since resettlement in the post-war period, these dialects have been tending to converge into a single standardized language.

== Country ==
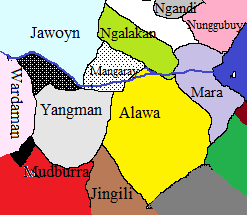
Traditional lands of the Aboriginal tribes in the Roper River area of the Northern Territory

Historically, the land occupied by the Jawoyn, which Norman Tindale has estimated covered about 3,800 square miles (9,800 km^{2}), were in the Katherine Gorge area in the Northern Territory. The Jawoyn call this area Nitmiluk, a name derived from the word nitmi (which refers to the cicada song that Nabilil the crocodile is said to have heard when he set up camp at the entrance to a particular gorge) and the word luk, which means "place". “Nitmiluk” specifically denotes a 12-kilometre stretch there, consisting of a chain of chasms and ravines. It has been suggested that the Jawoyn people refers not only to those who speak a Jawoyn language, but also to those who are associated with the landscapes inscribed in the Jawoyn language according to their foundational mythology of the Dreamtime. (Note: "Jawoyn people are Jawoyn not because they speak Jawoyn. But because they are linked to places to which the Jawoyn language is also linked". (Rumsey 2005, p. 200)) The language itself, in several varieties, was spoken along the Katherine River system as far as the Mainoru River. Their southern limits were around Maranboy, and their western extension came close to Katherine.

== Mythology ==
A widespread belief in Aboriginal thought holds that each language emerged during the formative time of creation when a demiurgic totem figure moved through the landscape crafting it and, simultaneously, endowing each topological feature with its proper word. The creative being changed the language at certain transit points which then were taken as boundary markers between tribes speaking different languages. Thus, in Jawoyn thinking, the landscape of the Katherine Gorge was created in the primordial time (burr) by Nabilil (Crocodile), who named all of the area's distinctive features in the Jawoyn language. He came from the sea, furnished with his firestick and moved through what became Dagoman and Nangiomeri lands before reaching the gorge.

The Burr Dreamtime also contains other key figures of myth such as Boolong (the Rainbow Serpent) and Barraya (the kookaburra).

== History of contact ==
Many Jawoyn moved to Tandandjal on the ridge affording spring water of a grassy plain 44 miles east-north of Maranboy in November 1948 when a short-lived government settlement for Aborigines had been established. The surrounding hills were thickly forested with lancewoods and eucalypts. While exploring the area in June of that year Ivan Frazer came across a cave littered with stone artifacts, whose walls were adorned with paintings.

== Notable people and events ==
- John Ah Kit
- Ngaree Ah Kit
- Richard (Dick) Butler
- Bangardi Robert Lee (1952–2005), a leader of the Bagala clan, who initiated the Barunga Sport and Cultural Festival in 1985

== Seasons ==
Jawoyn seasonal calendar
Jiorrk	Bungarung	Jungalk	Malaparr	Worrwopmi	Wakaringding
January February	March April May		June July August	September October	November December
Main part of wet rains	Last rains	Early hot dry	Middle dry	Early build-up	The build-up
	Drying out		Cooler	Hot and sticky	First rains
			Burning time		

== Alternative names ==
- Adowen
- Charmong
- Chau-an
- Djauun
- Djauwung
- Djawin
- Djawun
- Djouan
- Jawan, Jawony, Kumertuo, (Note: In Tindale's classification, Kumertuo refers rather to the Djowei. (Tindale 1974, p. 224)) according to Ethnologue
- Jawin
- Tjauen
- Tweinbol

== Some words ==
- Bobo, "goodbye"
- Yowoyn, "yes", "alright"

Source: Language 2016

== See also ==
- Edith Falls
- Nitmiluk National Park

== Sources ==
- Allam, Lorena (13 July 2020). "John Ah Kit: leader and tireless advocate for Aboriginal rights dies aged 69". The Guardian.
- Arndt, W. (June 1962). "The Nargorkun-Narlinji Cult". Oceania. 32 (4): 298–320. doi:10.1002/j.1834-4461.1962.tb01784.x. JSTOR 4032938.
- Arndt, W. (March 1966). "Seventy Year Old Records and New Information on the Nargorkun—Narlinji Cult". Oceania. 36 (3): 231–238. doi:10.1002/j.1834-4461.1966.tb00288.x. JSTOR 40329519.
- "The Barunga Statement". AIATSIS. 29 May 2018.
- Davidson, D. S. (January–June 1935). "Archaeological Problems of Northern Australia". The Journal of the Royal Anthropological Institute of Great Britain and Ireland. 65: 145–183. doi:10.2307/2843847. JSTOR 2843847.
- Dixon, Robert M. W. (2004) [First published 2002]. Australian Languages: Their Nature and Development. Vol. 1. Cambridge University Press. pp. 201–228. ISBN 978-0-521-47378-1.
- "Djauan". Ethnologue. 2016.
- Dunbar-Hall, Peter; Gibson, Chris (2004). Deadly Sounds, Deadly Places: Contemporary Aboriginal Music in Australia. University of New South Wales Press. pp. 201–228. ISBN 978-0-868-40622-0.
- Eylmann, Erhard (1908). Die Eingeborenen der Kolonie Südaustralien (PDF). Berlin: D.Reimer.
- "Language". Jawoyn Association Aboriginal Corporation. 2016. Archived from the original on 22 October 2016.
- "The life and times of Aboriginal rights champion and political trailblazer John Ah Kit, dead at 69". ABC News. 13 July 2020.
- Macintosh, N. W. G. (March 1951). "Archæology of Tandandjal Cave, South-West Arnhem Land". Oceania. 21 (3): 178–204. doi:10.1002/j.1834-4461.1951.tb00533.x. JSTOR 40328290.
- Macintosh, N. W. G. (June 1952). "Paintings in Beswick Creek Cave, Northern Territory". Oceania. 22 (4): 256–274. doi:10.1002/j.1834-4461.1952.tb00182.x. JSTOR 40328351.
- Mathews, R. H. (1901). "Ethnological notes on the aboriginal tribes of the Northern Territory". Queensland Geographical Journal. 16: 69–90.
- McCarthy, F. D. (June 1939a). ""Trade" in Aboriginal Australia, and "Trade" Relationships with Torres Strait, New Guinea and Malaya". Oceania. 9 (4): 405–438. doi:10.1002/j.1834-4461.1939.tb00247.x. JSTOR 40327761.
- McCarthy, F. D. (September 1939b). ""Trade" in Aboriginal Australia, and "Trade" Relationships with Torres Strait, New Guinea and Malaya (Continued)". Oceania. 10 (1): 80–104. doi:10.1002/j.1834-4461.1939.tb00258.x. JSTOR 40327722.
- McCarthy, F. D. (December 1939c). ""Trade" in Aboriginal Australia, and "Trade" Relationships with Torres Strait, New Guinea and Malaya (Continued)". Oceania. 10 (2): 171–195. doi:10.1002/j.1834-4461.1939.tb00275.x. JSTOR 40327735.
- Merlan, Francesca (1998). Caging the Rainbow: Places, Politics, and Aborigines in a North Australian Town. University of Hawaii Press. ISBN 978-0-824-82045-9.
- Merlan, Francesca (2016). "Correlation of Textual and Spatial Reference: This and That". In Verstraete, Jean-Christophe; Hafner, Diane (eds.). Land and Language in Cape York Peninsula and the Gulf Country. John Benjamins Publishing Company. pp. 199–217. ISBN 978-9-027-26760-3.
- Parkhouse, T. A. (1895a). "Native tongues in the neighbourhood of Port Darwin" (PDF). Transactions of the Royal Society of South Australia. 19: 1–18.
- Parkhouse, T. A. (1895b). Native tribes of Port Darwin and its neighbourhood. Australasian Association for the Advancement of Science – via Trove.
- Reid, Alan J. (1995). Caging Banksias and Bilbies: Seasons of Australia: a Weekly Guide to Natural Events in Australia, with Space for Your Own Records. Gould League of Victoria. ISBN 978-1-875-68726-8.
- Rumsey, Alan (2005) [First published 1993]. "Language and Territoriality in Aboriginal Australia". In Walsh, Michael; Yallop, Colin (eds.). Language and Culture in Aboriginal Australia. Aboriginal Studies Press. pp. 191–206. ISBN 978-0-855-75241-5.
- Spencer, Baldwin (1914). Native tribes of the Northern Territory of Australia (PDF). London: Macmillan Publishers.
- Tindale, Norman Barnett (1974). "Djauan (NT)". Aboriginal Tribes of Australia: Their Terrain, Environmental Controls, Distribution, Limits, and Proper Names. Australian National University. ISBN 978-0-708-10741-6. Archived from the original on 20 March 2020.
- Tsunoda, Tasaku (2006). Language Endangerment and Language Revitalization: An Introduction. Walter de Gruyter. ISBN 978-3-110-89658-9.
