= Hibbertia auriculiflora =

Scientific classification
- Kingdom: Plantae
- Clade: Tracheophytes
- Clade: Angiosperms
- Clade: Eudicots
- Order: Dilleniales
- Family: Dilleniaceae
- Genus: Hibbertia
- Species: H. auriculiflora

Binomial name
- Hibbertia auriculiflora Toelken

Species of flowering plant

Hibbertia auriculiflora is a species of flowering plant in the family Dilleniaceae and is endemic to northern parts of the Northern Territory. It is usually a short-lived perennial shrublet covered with hairs and scales and has mostly oblong to linear leaves. The flowers are usually arranged singly or in groups of two or three in leaf axils, with twenty-five to thirty-two stamens arranged in groups around the two carpels.

== Description ==
Hibbertia auriculiflora is usually a short-lived perennial shrublet that typically grows to a height of up to 50 cm (20 in), its foliage more or less densely covered with hairs and scales. The leaves are oblong to linear, 8.3–61.3 mm (0.33–2.41 in) long and 2.3–10.1 mm (0.091–0.398 in) wide and sessile or on a petiole up to 4.6 mm (0.18 in) long. The flowers are arranged singly or in groups of two or three in leaf axils on a peduncle 2.3–8.5 mm (0.091–0.335 in) long, with elliptic bracts 3.1–4.5 mm (0.12–0.18 in) long. The five sepals are joined at the base, the two outer sepal lobes 5.2–8.2 mm (0.20–0.32 in) long and the inner lobes 3.9–6.1 mm (0.15–0.24 in) long. The five petals are egg-shaped with the narrower end towards the base, yellow, 3.4–9.6 mm (0.13–0.38 in) long with two lobes. There are twenty-five to thirty-two stamens arranged in groups around the two densely scaly carpels, each carpel with two ovules. Flowering occurs from April to May.

== Taxonomy ==
Hibbertia auriculiflora was first formally described in 2010 by Hellmut R. Toelken in the Journal of the Adelaide Botanic Gardens from specimens he collected above the falls on Waterfall Creek in 2004. The specific epithet (auriculiflora) means "earlike-appendage flowered", referring to the spreading tips of the sepal lobes.

In the same paper, Toelken described two subspecies, and the names are accepted by the Australian Plant Census:

- Hibbertia auriculiflora Toelken subsp. auriculiflora;
- Hibbertia auriculiflora subsp. minor Toelken that differs from the autonym in having sepal lobes shorter than 6 mm (0.24 in) and fewer stamens.

== Distribution and habitat ==
This hibbertia grows in sandy soil on sandstone in woodland on the Arnhem Land escarpment in the northern parts of the Northern Territory.

== Conservation status ==
Goodenia auriculiflora subsp. auriculiflora is classified as of "near threatened" but subsp. minor is listed as of "least concern" under the Northern Territory Government Territory Parks and Wildlife Conservation Act 1976.

== See also ==
- List of Hibbertia species
