= Cyclone Les =

Tropical Cyclone Les
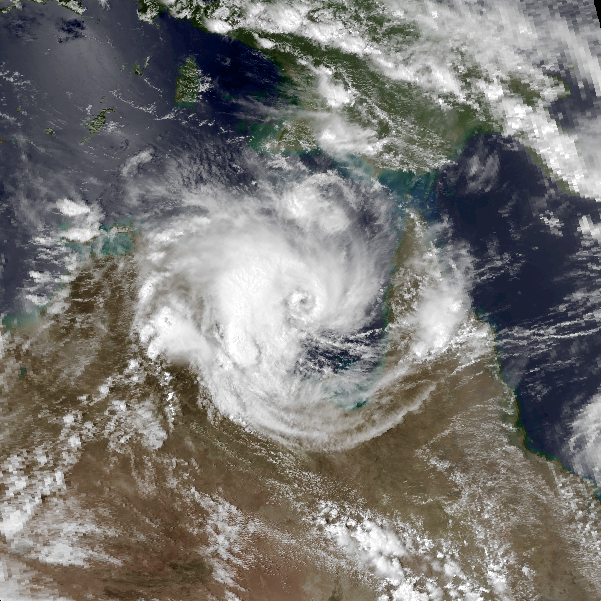
- Tropical Cyclone Les on 24 January 1998

Meteorological history
- Formed: 19 January 1998
- Dissipated: 1 February 1998

Category 2 tropical cyclone
- 10-minute sustained (Aus)
- Highest winds: 110 km/h (70 mph)
- Lowest pressure: 976 hPa (mbar); 28.82 inHg

Tropical storm
- 1-minute sustained (SSHWS/JTWC)
- Highest winds: 95 km/h (60 mph)

Overall effects
- Fatalities: 3 direct
- Damage: $64.7 million (1998 USD)
- Areas affected: Queensland, Northern Territory, Western Australia
- IBTrACS
- Part of the 1997–98 Australian region cyclone season

Tropical Cyclone Les was a Category 2 storm in the 1997–98 Australian region cyclone season, which affected the Northern Territory of Australia in January 1998.

== Meteorological history ==
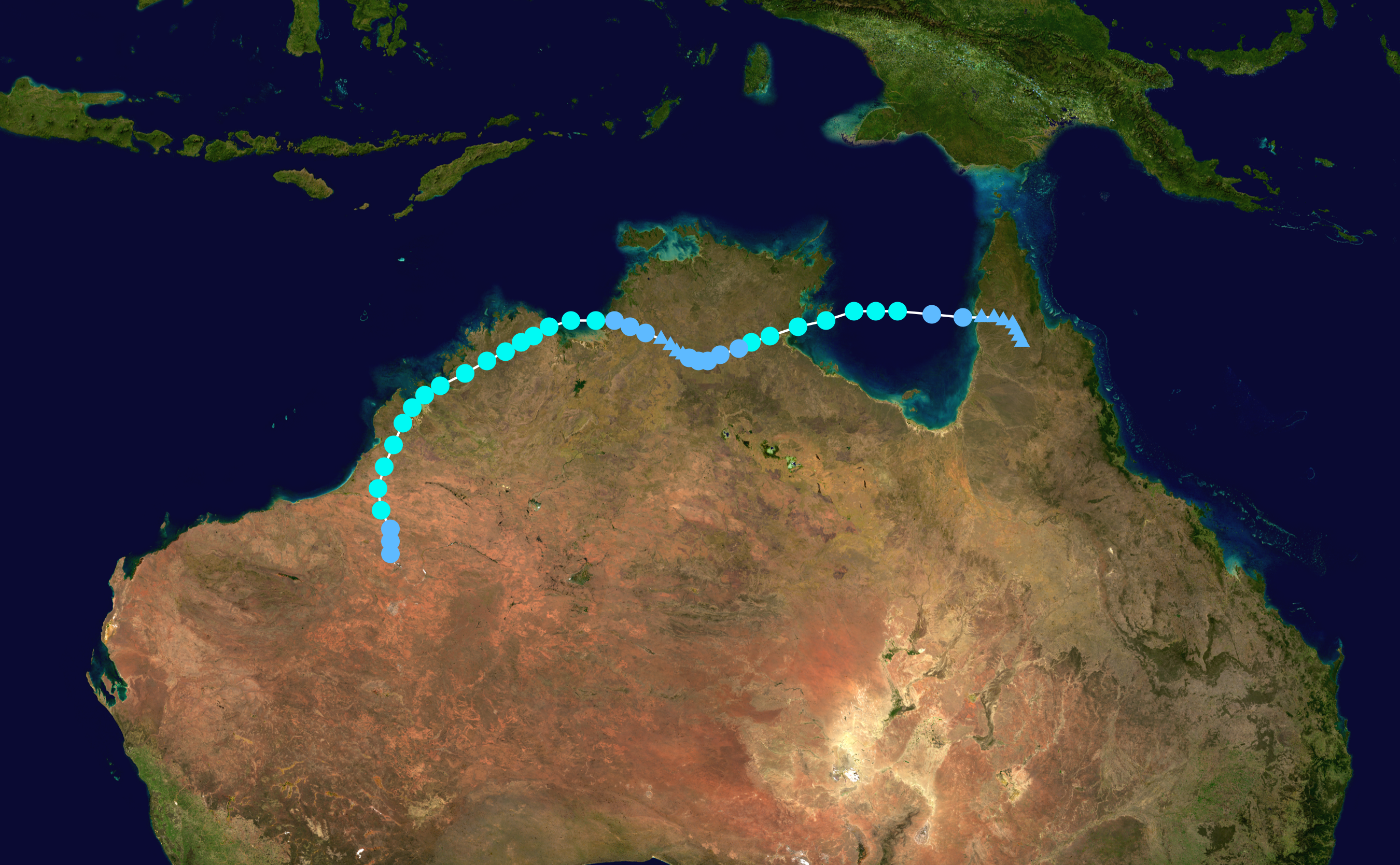
Map plotting the storm's track and intensity, according to the Saffir–Simpson scale Map key Saffir–Simpson scale Tropical depression (≤38 mph, ≤62 km/h) Tropical storm (39–73 mph, 63–118 km/h) Category 1 (74–95 mph, 119–153 km/h) Category 2 (96–110 mph, 154–177 km/h) Category 3 (111–129 mph, 178–208 km/h) Category 4 (130–156 mph, 209–251 km/h) Category 5 (≥157 mph, ≥252 km/h) Unknown Storm type Tropical cyclone Subtropical cyclone Extratropical cyclone, remnant low, tropical disturbance, or monsoon depression

On 19 January 1998, an area of low pressure developed over the Gulf of Carpentaria. Little development occurred as the system traveled initially towards the southwest and later towards the east. Late on 21 January, the low moved over the Cape York Peninsula in Queensland and began to strengthen. A surge of moisture from a northwest monsoon and a tightening pressure gradient due to an area of high pressure located over the Great Australian Bight, allowed the system to develop. The first warning published by the Australian Bureau of Meteorology was issued on 23 January, after the storm had moved back over the Gulf of Carpentaria.

== Storm and impact ==
The intense rainfall also occurred during "king high tides" in the Timor Sea that pushed water from the lower reaches upstream, as a result, floodwater drainage was impeded. Flooding was most severe in Katherine, Northern Territory, where flooding began 24 January. Many residents were evacuated to cyclone shelters, while several others were stranded on rooftops. On Australia Day, 26 January, roads north and south from Katherine were closed due to rising floodwaters, and Royal Australian Air Force personnel from RAAF Base Tindal joined local police and emergency services to assist with sandbagging critical infrastructure. Some 5000 residents were evacuated as an estimated 500 businesses and 1200 homes were inundated by floodwaters, including the Katherine District Hospital. On 27 January, a state of emergency was declared for Katherine as the Katherine River reached a level of 20.3 m (66.6 ft). The floodwaters peaked at 20.4 m (67 ft) at the Katherine railway bridge, passing the previous record of 19.3m during major flooding in 1957. Two days later, 392 residents were evacuated from the Daly River region, approximately 200 km (120 mi) downstream from Katherine, where floodwaters had risen above 11.5m and would continue to rise to a peak of 16.8 m (55 ft) on 3 February.

The cyclone dumped over 380mm of rainfall in the area within a 48-hour period, leaving water up to 2 m (6.5 ft) through much of the town. The flooding forced at least 2,000 people out of their homes, and killed 3 people. Total damages from the storm amounted to at least A$100 million (US$64.7 million). Additionally, local infrastructure was severely damaged by the storm. During the flood emergency, the only road access between Darwin and the rest of Australia was impassable for five days. Drainage and sewerage systems failed, leading to an outbreak of gastroenteritis. When the flood waters receded, priority was given to making critical facilities such as the hospital operational once again, with 300 additional Australian Defence Force personnel arriving to assist with the clean-up.

== Aftermath ==
Through the Appropriation (Flood Relief) Bill (1998) the Northern Territory Government released $10 million of funds for immediate flood relief. It was estimated at this time that at least $30 million would be required for capital works reconstruction, and a similar amount to be allocated to supporting business and individuals. It was expected this amount would be met by the Commonwealth Government. The Northern Territory Government conducted studies in the area in the years following the disaster to learn how better to prepare for major flood events, and now makes flood maps and information brochures available to the public as well as other early warning systems such as flood sirens and live webcams monitoring the river.

On 30 January, Prime Minister of Australia John Howard visited Katherine, announcing measures including disaster relief payments of $1000 for each adult and $200 for each child affected by the flooding, the creation of a taskforce to investigate problems faced by those who were not insured for flooding as well as $5 million in funding for repairs and improvements to the Stuart Highway.

The economic impact of the disaster on the town of Katherine was significant. Of the estimated $200 million damages, only $70 million was insured and many local businesses were forced to close. The pastoral industry, worth over $60 million annually to the region was badly affected by the loss of whole herds of livestock to the rising waters.

A study conducted by the School for Social and Policy Research at Charles Darwin University in 2008 analysed trends in census data before and after the disaster and found that the population had not yet recovered to pre-flood levels ten years after the event, and the demographics in the town had shifted significantly.

In 2008, the Katherine Town Council submitted to Infrastructure Australia documents outlining the approximate costing and importance of relocating the town's hospital and ambulance station to a less flood-prone area following the total evacuation and inundation of both facilities during the 1998 and 2006 flood events.

== See also ==
- 1997–98 Australian region cyclone season
