= Katherine, Northern Territory =

Katherine Gajadein (Australian Kriol)
- Town
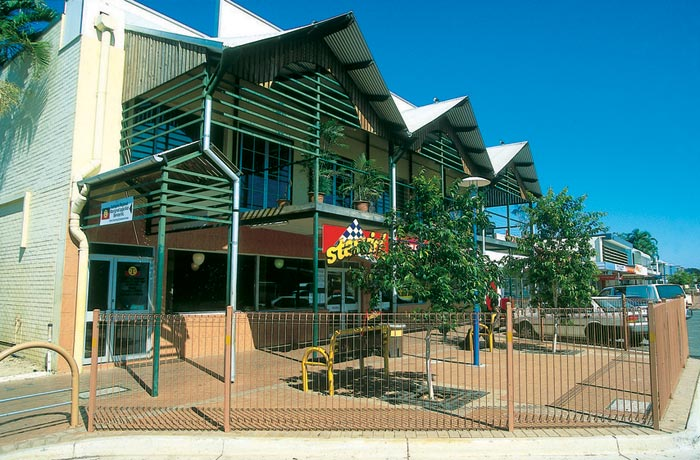
- Katherine; Main street (Stuart Highway / Katherine Terrace)

- Coordinates: 14°27′41″S 132°15′58″E
- Country: Australia
- State: Northern Territory
- LGA: Town of Katherine
- Location: 318 km (198 mi) S of Darwin; 1,185 km (736 mi) N of Alice Springs; 516 km (321 mi) E of Kununurra (WA); 273 km (170 mi) N of Daly Waters
- Established: 1926

Government
  - Territory electorate: Katherine
  - Federal division: Lingiari
- Elevation: 108 m (354 ft)

Population
  - Total: 9,643 (2021 census)
- Postcode: 0850, 0852
- Mean max temp: 34.2 °C (93.6 °F)
- Mean min temp: 20.2 °C (68.4 °F)
- Annual rainfall: 1,112.5 mm (43.80 in)

Katherine (/ˈkæθɹɪn/; Australian Kriol: Gajadein) is a town in the Northern Territory of Australia. It is situated on the Katherine River, after which it is named, 320 kilometres (200 mi) southeast of Darwin. The fourth largest settlement in the Territory, it is known as the place where "the outback meets the tropics". Katherine had an urban population of 9,643 at the 2021 Australian census.

Katherine is also the closest major town to RAAF Base Tindal, located 17 km (11 mi) southeast, and provides education, health, local government services and employment opportunities for the families of Defence personnel stationed there. In the 2016 census, the base had a residential population of 857, with only around 20% of the workforce engaged in employment outside of defence, the majority commuting to work in Katherine. Katherine is also the central hub of the great "Savannah Way" which stretches from Cairns in north Queensland to Broome in the Kimberley region of Western Australia.

Beginning as an outpost established with the Australian Overland Telegraph Line on the north–south transport route between Darwin and Adelaide, Katherine has grown with the development of transport and local industries including mining – particularly gold mining; a strategic military function with RAAF Base Tindal; also as a tourism gateway to the attractions of nearby Nitmiluk National Park, particularly Nitmiluk (Katherine) Gorge and its many ancient rock paintings. The region floods heavily during the wet season.

== History ==
The first inhabitants of the area were Indigenous Australians, specifically the Dagoman people. It was an important meeting place for these tribes and remains a place of convergence. Today the Warlpiri people from the Victoria River District and Tanami Desert areas now have a dedicated community based at Katherine East, originating in their forced relocation to Lajamanu from 1949 onwards.

Explorer John McDouall Stuart passed through the area in 1862 on his successful third journey across the continent from north to south. On 4 July 1862, Stuart crossed the Katherine River 90 km upstream from the present town, and recorded in his diary: "Came upon another large creek, having a running stream to the south of west and coming from the north of east. This I have named 'Katherine', in honour of the second daughter of pastoralist James Chambers Esq." There is some conjecture over Stuart's accuracy. Chambers's wife's name was Katherine but, according to most sources, his daughter's name was Catherine.

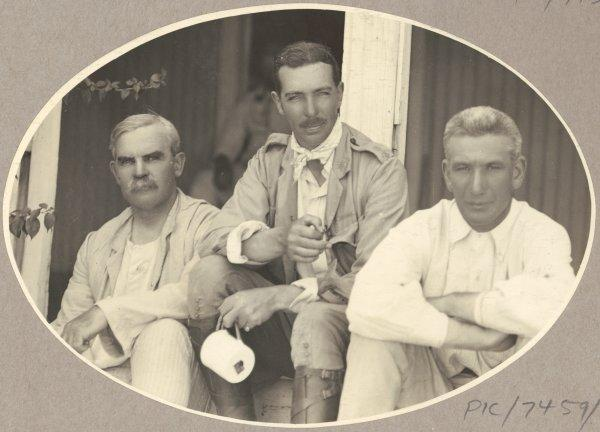
Ministers Josiah Thomas, Sir Walter Barettelot and Dr. John Gilruth of the Federal Parliamentary Party visiting Katherine Telegraph Station in 1912

Katherine Telegraph Station was established on 22 August 1872 and the completion of the Overland Telegraph Line later in 1872, and the town began with a small permanent population on the west side of the Katherine River. Katherine benefited from the proximity to nearby gold fields including Pine Creek 90 kilometres to the north.

Gold was discovered 50 kilometres to the north in 1889 at Mount Todd.

The North Australia Railway was extended to Katherine with construction beginning in 1923 of the Katherine railway bridge. During construction of the railway, the town's centre was relocated to the eastern side of the river. The bridge was completed in 1926 and the first train crossed on 21 January 1926. On 15 July 1926, the town's present site was gazetted. The original post office and the Overland Telegraph station were set just above Knott's Crossing and next to the Sportsman's Arms Hotel that had quarters for the station master at the Overland Telegraph station and a single room police station.

A significant development in Katherine's past was the arrival of a number of Russian migrants between 1929 and 1960. These migrants came to the area after the NT administration offered tracts of land for peanut farming along the Katherine River. Earlier, in 1880, government botanist Maurice Holtze had investigated the feasibility of peanuts as a crop and found peanut farming to be commercially viable. This encouraged some of the men who had just completed work on the North Australia Railway to take up the land. Other settlers were Cossacks who had fought against the newly formed Communist government in the Russian Civil War under Alexander Kolchak. The majority of the group had reached Australia between 1925 and 1928, and in 1929 they were able to commence clearing their land. The industry had mostly collapsed by the beginning of World War II because of erratic rainfall and a problematic supply chain. Among these migrants were Jim Zimin, Ivan Ivanetz and Nadia Pascoe.

During World War II, the Australian Army set up two hospitals around Katherine, the 101st Australian General Hospital and 121st Australian General Hospital. The army also set up a Katherine Area Headquarters. On 22 March 1942, Katherine sustained its only air raid during World War II. One man was killed when a Japanese aircraft bombed the town.

Mining production has declined since the closure of the mine at Mount Todd (50 kilometres to the north) in 2000.

Construction began on a new rail line in July 2001. On 13 September 2003, the line was finished with a continuous track from Adelaide, South Australia, to Darwin. The Ghan passenger train service commenced on 4 February 2004, running weekly year round with a second service in peak season stopping at Katherine on both the northbound and southbound journeys.

The river flooded the town in 1931, 1940, 1957, 1998 and 2006. The 1998 floods were the worst on record. The river reached a height of 20.4 metres.

The April 2006 floods placed parts of the town under water (including about 50 houses), caused millions of dollars of damage, and resulted in the declaration of a state of emergency on 7 April. However, there were no reports of the flooding causing structural damage. Town residents were given warning that the river might flood on 5 April, and the town centre was underwater before noon the next day. The floodwaters reached a peak of nearly 19 metres at the Katherine River bridge. Dozens of homes were inundated with up to 2 m of water, with many residents having time to escape with little more than the clothes they were wearing. Over the weekend of 8–9 April, more than 1,100 people went to the evacuation centres in the town. The state of emergency was lifted on 9 April.

In recent decades, Katherine has developed as a regional centre supporting the cattle, horticulture, agriculture and tourism industries. Located at the junction of major tourism drives, Central Arnhem Road, the Savannah Way and the Explorers Way, Katherine is an important visitor gateway for the Northern Territory.

On Australia Day in 1998 a major flood devastated the town, and the area was declared a national disaster. The flood resulted from the 300–400 mm of rainfall brought by Cyclone Les that caused the already full Katherine River to peak at 20.4 metres. The floodwaters inundated the town and much of the surrounding region, requiring the evacuation of many residents. The flood covered an area of 1,000 square kilometres, affected 1,100 homes and cut off many roads in and out of Katherine. Three people drowned.

== Population ==
According to the 2016 census of Population, there were 6,303 people in Katherine.

- Aboriginal and Torres Strait Islander people made up 25.4% of the population.
- 66.2% of people were born in Australia. The next most common countries of birth were Philippines 2.9%, New Zealand 1.8% and England 1.7%.
- 64.3% of people spoke only English at home. Other languages spoken at home included Kriol at 3.5%.
- The most common response for religion was No Religion at 31.1%.

Katherine's population swells immensely during the Dry Season. Each year hundreds of older people (termed "Grey nomads") from the colder parts of Australia pack caravans and head north to Katherine and other locations throughout the Northern Territory.

== Geography and climate ==
=== Topography ===
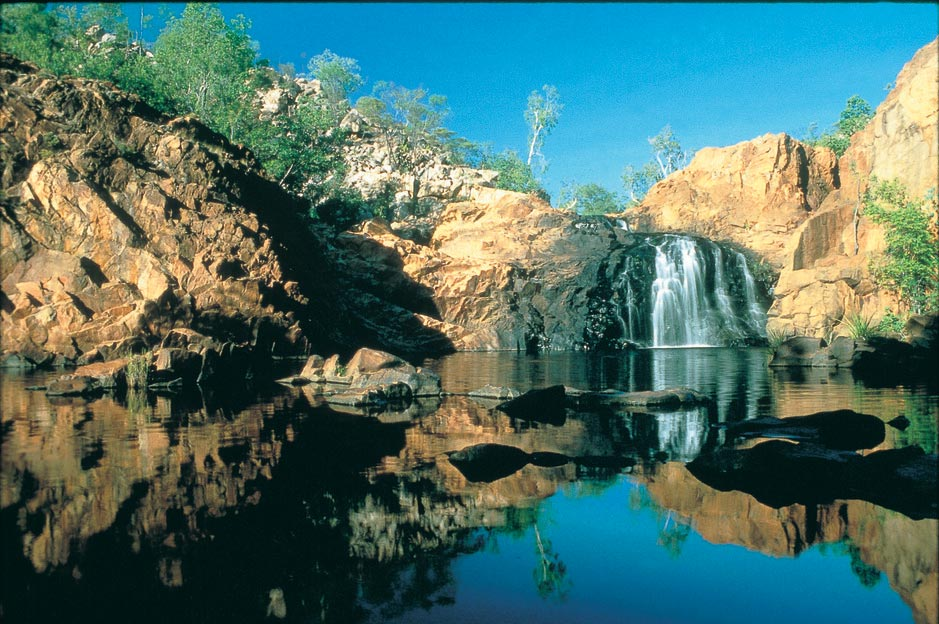
Edith Falls at the end of the wet season

Katherine is located 320 kilometres (200 mi) south of Darwin, and is situated on the banks of the Katherine River, which is part of the Daly River system. The upper reaches rise into the Arnhem Land escarpment and Kakadu, to the northeast. The Victoria River (The Northern Territory's largest river system) is situated 189 kilometres (117 mi) south-west of Katherine along the Victoria Highway. Katherine is at the crossroads of the Outback due to its location between the Darwin region, Kakadu National Park, the Barkley Region, the Gulf of Carpentaria and the Kimberley region of Western Australia.

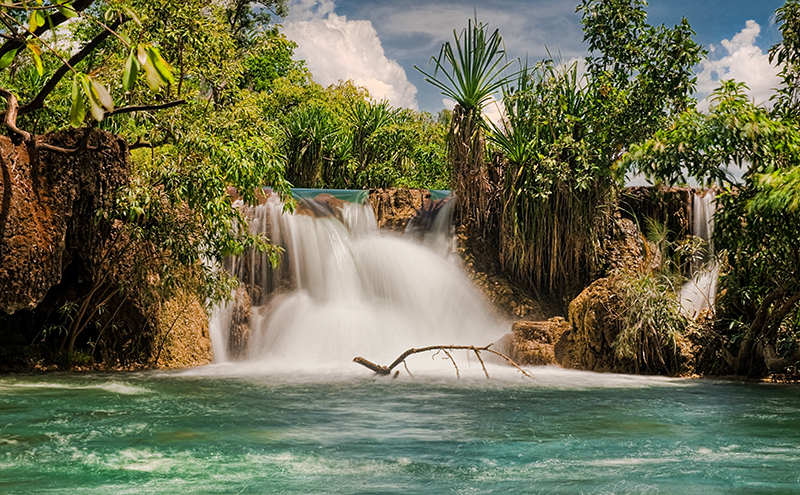
Giwining/Flora River Nature Park

The topography of the region is predominantly dry tropical savanna woodlands and consists of plains, hills, rock outcrops. To the east lies Koombolgie sandstone escarpments and spectacular gorges through Nitmiluk National Park. The township itself is set among relatively flat plains along the Katherine River within the Tindall / Oolloo Aquifers, dotted with rugged Karst limestone formations, caves and jagged outcrops. Numerous mesas (flat-topped hills or "Jump-ups") emerge south-west of Katherine on surrounding cattle stations.

Katherine is within an ecoregion classified as the Kimberley tropical savanna which covers a large portion of Australia's north-west through WA and the NT.

=== Climate ===
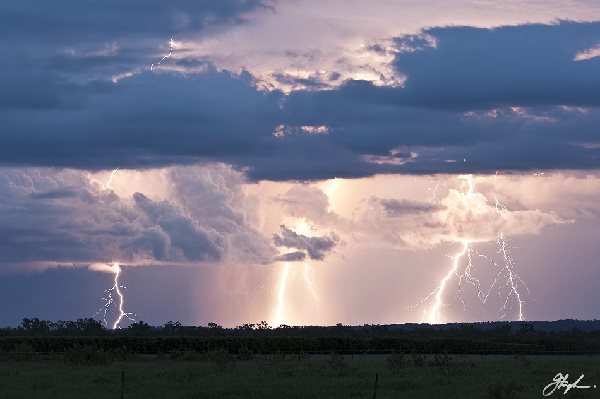
Wet season electrical storms over Katherine Gorge

Katherine experiences a dry tropical savanna climate (Köppen climate classification Aw) with distinct wet and dry seasons. Daily high temperatures in the wet season typically range from 30 to 37 °C (86 to 99 °F), reaching over 40 °C (104 °F) from late September to late November. Very high humidity accompanies high temperatures during the build-up period to the wet season, when the region receives spectacular electrical storms. The wet season monsoon period is a dramatic time of year, from large thunderstorms and heavy downpours to the transitions of lush greenery appearing from the parched deciduous landscapes of the dry season. Katherine experiences around 50 thunderstorm days per year, most of which occur from November to April.

In the dry, the nights can get quite cool, regularly dropping to 7 °C (45 °F) around June and July. Humidity levels are much lower from June to August and hence this has become the most popular time for visitors who wish to explore the region. Most parks and roads are accessible during the dry season, whereas the wet season often causes accessibility restrictions.

Low elevation relative to surrounding areas, as well as the town's situation on the banks of a river, means that the area is prone to flooding. A flood on Australia Day in 1998 was particularly destructive. Ex-Tropical Cyclone Les produced between 300 and 400 millimetres (12 and 16 in) of rainfall during a 48-hour period, causing the Katherine River to rise to 21.3 metres and claim the lives of three people.

Climate data for Katherine Aviation Museum, Northern Territory, Australia (1991–2020 normals, extremes 1946–2011)
Month	Jan	Feb	Mar	Apr	May	Jun	Jul	Aug	Sep	Oct	Nov	Dec	Year
Record high °C (°F)	40.9 (105.6)	39.0 (102.2)	39.8 (103.6)	38.3 (100.9)	36.5 (97.7)	36.1 (97.0)	36.0 (96.8)	37.7 (99.9)	40.5 (104.9)	41.6 (106.9)	43.1 (109.6)	41.5 (106.7)	43.1 (109.6)
Mean daily maximum °C (°F)	34.3 (93.7)	33.8 (92.8)	34.3 (93.7)	34.0 (93.2)	32.1 (89.8)	30.1 (86.2)	30.4 (86.7)	32.2 (90.0)	35.9 (96.6)	37.5 (99.5)	37.4 (99.3)	35.7 (96.3)	34.0 (93.1)
Daily mean °C (°F)	29.2 (84.6)	29.0 (84.2)	28.7 (83.7)	27.4 (81.3)	24.5 (76.1)	22.0 (71.6)	21.7 (71.1)	23.4 (74.1)	28.1 (82.6)	30.6 (87.1)	31.1 (88.0)	30.1 (86.2)	27.2 (80.9)
Mean daily minimum °C (°F)	24.1 (75.4)	24.1 (75.4)	23.0 (73.4)	20.7 (69.3)	16.8 (62.2)	13.8 (56.8)	13.0 (55.4)	14.6 (58.3)	20.2 (68.4)	23.6 (74.5)	24.7 (76.5)	24.5 (76.1)	20.3 (68.5)
Record low °C (°F)	19.0 (66.2)	18.7 (65.7)	15.5 (59.9)	9.8 (49.6)	6.3 (43.3)	3.8 (38.8)	4.2 (39.6)	4.0 (39.2)	8.2 (46.8)	13.3 (55.9)	14.5 (58.1)	19.3 (66.7)	3.8 (38.8)
Average precipitation mm (inches)	305.5 (12.03)	228.5 (9.00)	174.3 (6.86)	43.6 (1.72)	2.5 (0.10)	0.5 (0.02)	0.1 (0.00)	1.3 (0.05)	3.4 (0.13)	30.5 (1.20)	105.0 (4.13)	240.8 (9.48)	1,136 (44.72)
Average precipitation days (≥ 1 mm)	15.9	14.6	10.1	2.9	0.4	0.2	0.0	0.2	0.4	2.6	7.5	12.6	67.4
Average afternoon relative humidity (%)	58	61	50	38	33	31	27	24	25	29	38	50	39
Average dew point °C (°F)	23.0 (73.4)	23.3 (73.9)	20.7 (69.3)	16.8 (62.2)	12.9 (55.2)	9.9 (49.8)	8.5 (47.3)	7.9 (46.2)	11.4 (52.5)	14.2 (57.6)	18.4 (65.1)	21.5 (70.7)	15.7 (60.3)
Source 1:
Source 2:

=== Districts ===
The central business district of Katherine is set 350 metres from the banks of the Katherine River. The township services the regional centres of Pine Creek, Mataranka, Borooloola, Daly River and Timber Creek.

The RAAF Tindal Base is located 17 km from Katherine and plays a significant role in the local economy. Tindal Airbase officially opened on 1 October 1988.

The Katherine Town Council (municipality) Zone extends from Flora River Junction in the West to Maranboy in the East and from the Fergusson River in the North to the Sturt Plateau in the South. Other shire zones in the Katherine Region are the Victoria Daly and the Roper Gulf shires.

Traditional lands of the area include the dagomon Wardaman, and Jawoyn aboriginal land trusts. The township itself is a convergence zone of these traditional lands.

Wardaman country occupies areas to the west of Katherine, from Manbulloo (around Limestone Creek) to eastern parts of the Victoria River District.

Jawoyn country occupies areas to the east of Katherine from Lansdowne to the southern edge of Kakadu National Park, including Nitmiluk National Park, Barunga, Beswick and south-western Arnhem Land.

Dagoman country occupies areas to the south of Katherine, from Leach Lagoon, the Upper King River, the Dry River and across to the Warlock Ponds near Mataranka.

=== Built environment ===
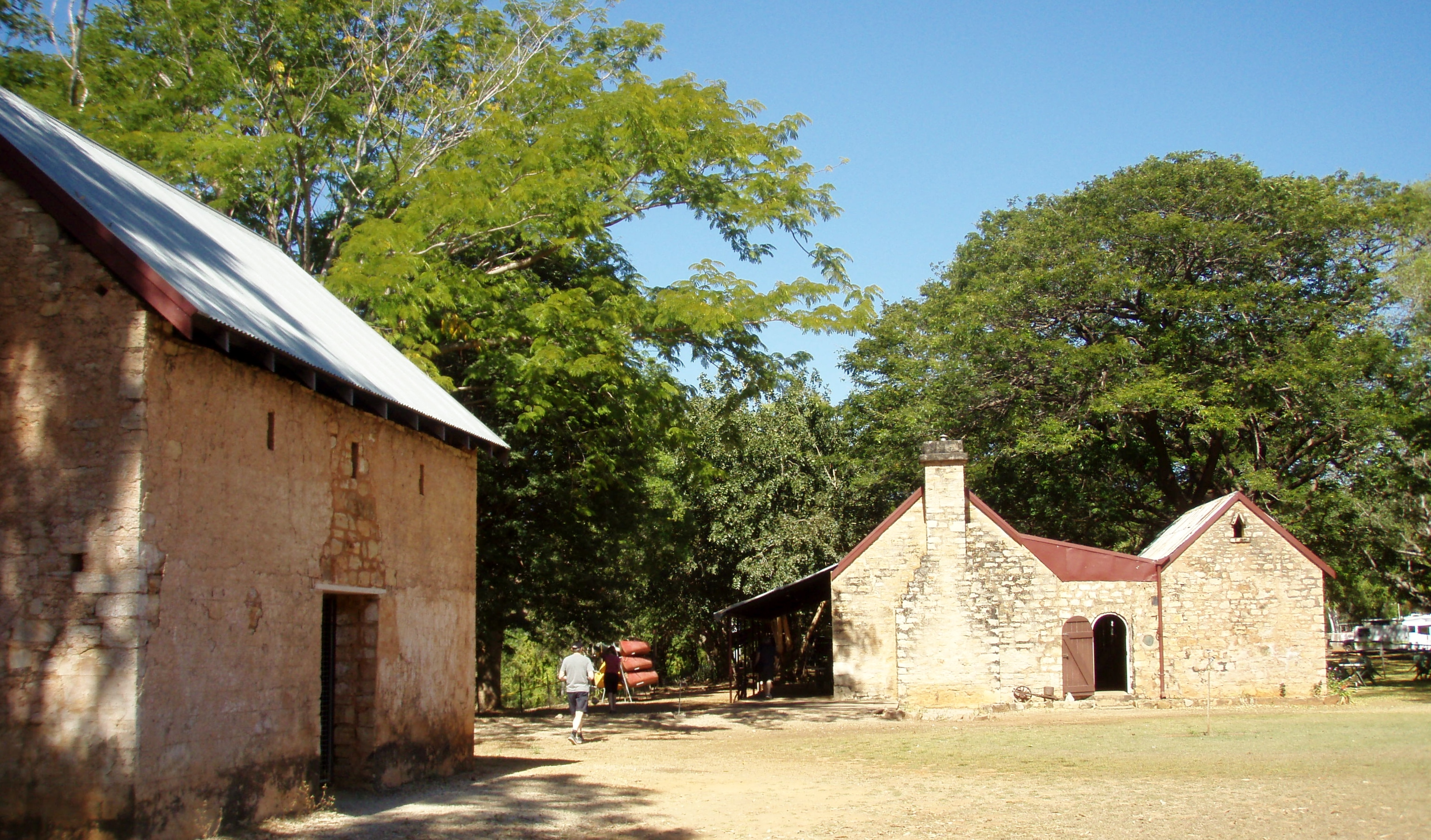
Springvale Homestead

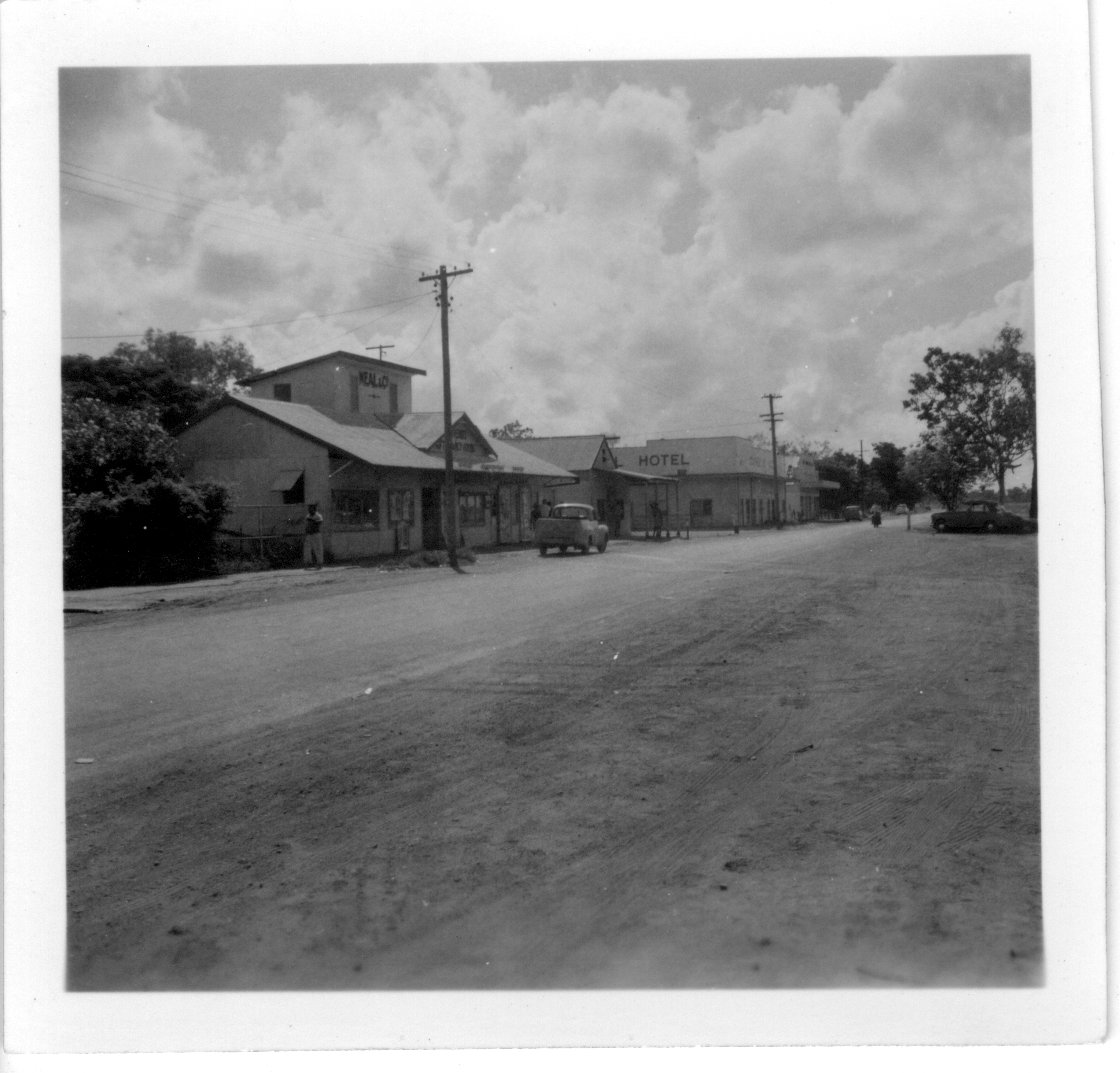
The main street of Katherine in January 1955

Springvale Homestead, built in 1879, is the oldest original homestead in the Northern Territory. The homestead was originally managed by Alfred Giles, an ex-Overland Telegraph linesman. The Old Katherine Railway Station is another historic attraction that served Vestey's Meatworks during their operation in Darwin and was a major hub of transport during World War II.

Another historic site is the O’Keeffe Residence. Originally built as a recreation hut in 1943 for army officers during World War II, the structure serves as a good example of local construction practice, using local materials like Cypress pine and corrugated iron.

The Gallon Licence Store is another historical gem of the Old Katherine Settlement, built by Bernard Murphy in 1891. Located near Knotts Crossing, it is surrounded by large Boab Trees and Bauhinia near the banks of the Katherine River. The Gallon Licence Store was also featured in the crocodile horror film Rogue.

Since the establishment of Nitmiluk National Park, Katherine has developed into a tourism destination. Katherine Gorge in Nitmiluk National Park attracts large numbers of visitors each year (232,000 in 2004–05).

== Parks and gardens ==
Katherine town and surrounds provide plenty of park and garden areas. Dakota Park, Giles Park, Styles Park Jurassic Cycad Gardens, Jukes Park and O’Shea Park are in the town. Tourist attractions include Nitmiluk National Park and Cutta Cutta Caves Nature Park, Kintore Caves Nature Park with its populations of endangered cycads, Low Level Nature Park, Springvale Homestead and Katherine Hot Springs. Other significant parks of the region include Elsey National Park, Gregory National Park and Giwining / Flora River Nature Park.

Along Riverbank Drive on the Katherine River, Katherine Hot Springs provides swimming, shaded picnic tables and barbecue facilities set amongst tall paperpark trees and ghost gums, with an abundant array of birds and wildlife. A paved pathway loops around and along the Katherine River and mountain bike trails weave on and off a paved pathway down to the river. A popup cafe and bike hire are situated at the Hot Springs Carpark in the dry season (May to October).

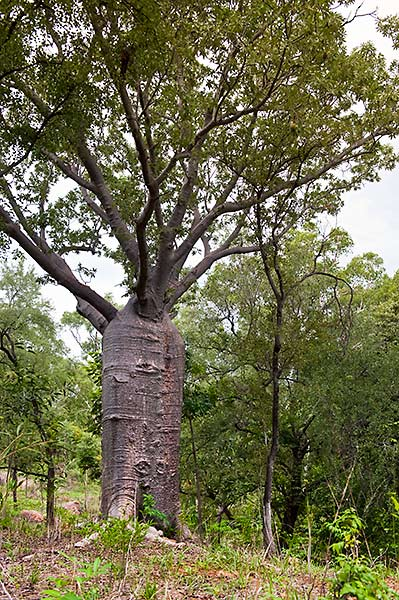
Boab tree along the Katherine River

Fishing for barramundi, tarpon (ox-eye herring) and sooty grunter, locally known as "Black Bream", are also popular along the Katherine River. The river hosts a diverse variety of fish species. The low level nature reserve and hot springs and Nitmiluk National Park are regularly checked for crocodiles and are regarded reasonably safe for swimming during the dry season months.

Popular fishing spots:

Donkey Camp, the Old King River Crossing, Knott's Crossing and Edith River are good fishing spots. The Flora River 90 minutes southwest of town also offers excellent barramundi fishing either by casting from the bank or by small boat. The Flora is inhabited by saltwater crocodiles year-round and swimming is not permitted.

Both freshwater crocodiles (Crocodylus johnstoni) and saltwater crocodiles (Crocodylus porosus) inhabit river systems in the Katherine Region.

== Government ==
The seat of local government for the Town of Katherine is located in Katherine. The council consists of five aldermen, a mayor, and a deputy mayor. The town's current mayor is Elisabeth Clark.

At Territory level, the electoral division of Katherine covers the town and its suburbs and elects one member to the Northern Territory Legislative Assembly. Jo Hersey won the election in 2020 for the CLP, ousting Labor party member Sandra Nelson. Many Northern Territory Government departments have offices in Katherine with most of these housed in the Government Centre building in First Street, which allows the community to access services such as motor vehicle registration and public health clinics, family and community services and public housing. There is also a courthouse located next door which regularly hears matters before the Northern Territory Magistrates Court within the chambers.

In the Australian House of Representatives, Katherine is part of the Division of Lingiari, which includes all of the Territory outside the Darwin/Palmerston area. Lingiari is currently held by Marion Scrymgour. The Australian Senate has two senators from the Northern Territory – Jacinta Price representing the Country Liberal Party and Malarndirri McCarthy from the Australian Labor Party. Katherine has been a solid base for the centre-right Country Liberal Party.

Federal Government services including Centrelink are also accessible through offices in Katherine.

== Economy ==
The pastoral industry, mining, defence (RAAF Base Tindal) and tourism contribute to the economy of Katherine. In 2003–04, the estimated total value of agriculture production from the Katherine Region was $75M: $52M from cattle, $16.5M from fruit and vegetables and $7M from hay and other field crops. Production from mining in the region was estimated at $201M in 2003–04, or 13% of NT mining and energy production. Major commodities included lead, zinc, barites, limestone and gravel.

In support of the pastoral and agriculture industries, the Northern Territory Department of Primary Industry and Fisheries maintains the Katherine Research Station, employing up to 40 staff in laboratories, greenhouses, coolrooms and animal-handling facilities, with open lands for cropping and grazing activities. The facility comprises 1,260 ha (3,100 acres) of land on a site located off the Stuart Highway 4 km (2.5 mi) east of Katherine. The research conducted at the station assists local farmers to align land-management to climate and environment, and to address pests and diseases.

Mangoes, including the Kensington Pride, are a major primary industry in the territory. In summer, the Katherine region is one of Australia's major mango-producing areas. The Northern Territory in general produces early-season (September–November) mangoes, avoiding the potentially damaging wet season.

Cotton is an emerging industry in and around Katherine. Trials of modern, generically modified cotton such as Bollgard3 have been undertaken at the Katherine Research Station. By 2019–20, 800 hectares of cotton was sown in the Territory across six properties in the Katherine and Top End regions, many of which are managed by operators from the Murray Darling regions of New South Wales. While 80% of crops were rain-fed, there are still environmental concerns over industry water usage, with projections that even small-scale irrigation for cotton could still amount to water usage equivalent to almost 70% of current allocations. A $70 million cotton gin was established by WANT north of Katherine in December 2023.

The town's principal retail facility, the Katherine Shopping Centre of 7,200 m^{2} (78,000 sq ft) is owned by Vicinity Centres and includes a Woolworths supermarket, a K Hub store (replaced Target Country in early 2021) and speciality stores.

== Transport ==
=== Rail ===
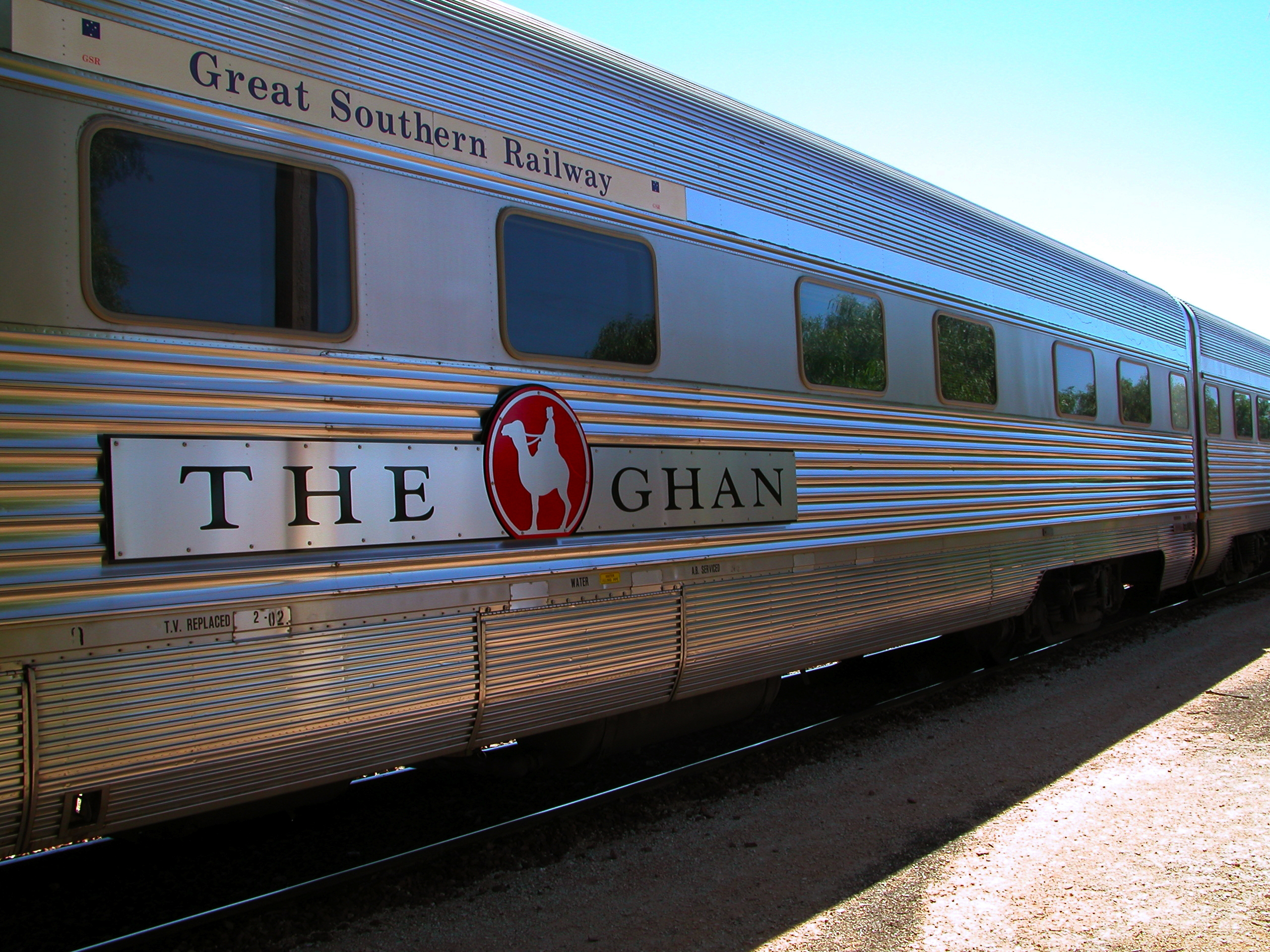
The Ghan

Katherine was originally connected to Darwin via the North Australia Railway, a narrow-gauge railway which reached the town in 1926. The line fell into disuse and was closed in May 1976, after damage caused by Cyclone Tracy led to the cessation of the shipment of iron ore from the Frances Creek mine. In 2003, the line was replaced when the standard gauge Adelaide–Darwin railway line was completed from Alice Springs to Darwin.

The Ghan operates between Adelaide and the Darwin railway terminal at Berrimah. It runs once a week in each direction, with some exceptions.

Preceding station	Journey Beyond	Following station
Darwin Terminus	The Ghan	Alice Springs towards Adelaide

A new Katherine Logistics and Agribusiness Hub is being planned. The proposed new passenger terminal and associated access road, carpark and rail platform will be constructed on a new rail line loop.

=== Air ===
Katherine Airport, situated within RAAF Base Tindal, is approximately 15 km south of the town centre. Airnorth flies to Katherine three times a week from Darwin and Alice Springs. Charter flights can also be arranged. The current airport shares facilities with RAAF Base Tindal, replacing the original Katherine Airfield which operated from 1930 to 1978, which was notable as the base from which Dr Clyde Fenton established the Northern Territory Aerial Medical Service.

The airport and town received an extended description in the book "Beyond the Blue Horizon" by Alexander Frater, written in the 1980s and describing a journey by local air services from London to Brisbane, retracing the route of the pioneer airline operations of the 1930s.

=== Road ===
Katherine is at the crossroads of the Savannah Way that runs east–west from Cairns to Broome and the Explorer's Way that runs north–south from Darwin to Adelaide through Alice Springs. Savannah Way runs along the Victoria Highway at Katherine and Explorers Way runs along Stuart Highway. The town is a three-hour drive from Darwin.

== Facilities ==
=== Education ===
As a major regional centre, the town provides primary, secondary and tertiary education options, as well as facilitating students with special needs and disabilities.

There are four public primary schools located in the town catering to students in from transition to year 7: Katherine South Public School, Clyde Fenton School, Macfarlane Primary School and Casuarina Street School. Each of these schools also has a pre-school attached. Kintore Street Special school caters for children with additional needs from 3.6 to 18 years.

Katherine High School is the only public secondary and middle years school (years 7 – 12) in the town and supports academic, sporting, and scientific learning opportunities for its students. The school has a well resourced library has a wide range of written and electronic media. Katherine High also boasts a large, airconditioned gymnasium allowing year round sporting activities and indoor activities. According to the Department of Education, Employment and Training, there are currently 586 students enrolled at the school. The current principal is Anne White. Due to the vast area and sparse population serviced by the Katherine Region, many students have to travel significant distances from their home to attend school. Callistemon House located nearby, while independent of Katherine High School provides accommodation for up to 40 high school students from remote areas so they may attend classes regularly at the school.

Saint Joseph's Catholic College provides an alternative to the public schools in Katherine, catering for students from pre-school to year 12. The school began offering year 11 studies in 2013 and year 12 studies in 2014. As of 2012, there were 330 students enrolled at the college.

Charles Darwin University maintains a campus in Katherine which is split between two locations. The Rural College is located on the Stuart Highway 16 km (9.9 mi) north of Katherine on the Stuart Highway and provides residential accommodation for students studying vocational courses or undertaking apprenticeships and traineeships in agriculture and rural production. The town offices are located within the CBD and offer vocational courses in other disciplines including studies of business, computing, childcare and community services.

Kintore Street School provides specialised education for students with special needs from across the Katherine region.

Katherine School of the Air was established in 1966 to provide distance education to students in remote locations and isolated communities. The school originally conducted classes via HF radio broadcasts, however with the advent of technologies such as satellite communications and the internet this system is no longer used. The school caters for approximately 250 students up to year 9 over an area of 800,000 km^{2} (310,000 sq mi). The school also promotes itself as a tourist attraction, boasting the "World's Largest Classroom".

=== Health ===
Katherine District Hospital is located in the town and provides emergency medical and surgical facilities as well as maternity, radiography and renal dialysis units and specialist services. GP appointments are available at Gorge Health. The Wurli-Wurlinjang Health Service offers culturally sensitive treatment for Indigenous patients.

=== Library ===
Also in town, on the first floor of the Randazzo Centre, on Katherine Terrace is the Katherine Public Library. The library is a free community service which offers memberships to all residents of the Katherine region and temporary memberships are available for visitors to the region. In addition to their borrowable collection of books, multimedia, audiobooks and e-resources the library is also home to the Northern Territory Collection; a special, not-for-loan collection that collects material relating specifically about or written by authors from the Northern Territory and the Katherine Region more specifically.

=== Leisure and entertainment ===
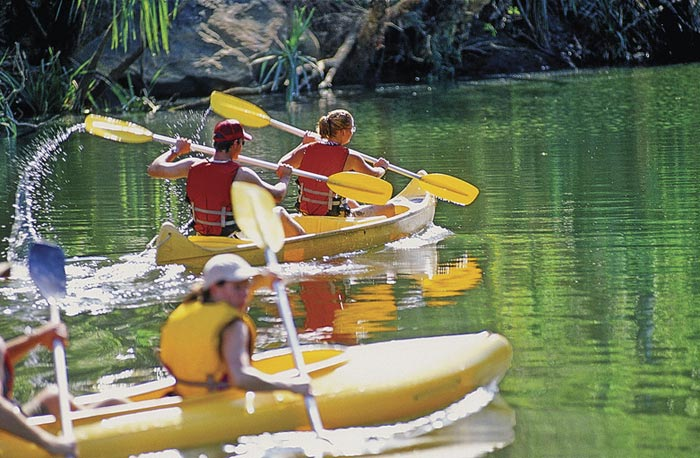
Canoeing at Katherine Gorge

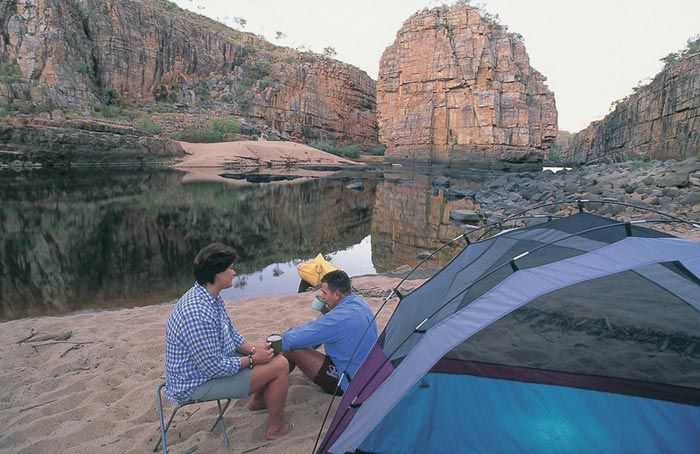
Camping at Katherine Gorge

Leisure and entertainment activities in Katherine are often nature-based. Katherine Hot Springs, Mataranka Hot Springs, canoeing in the gorges of Nitmiluk Gorge on the Katherine River, hunting, bushwalking, caving, camping and fishing on the Victoria, Daly, Roper or Katherine Rivers are all popular leisure activities. Although attempts are made to safely relocate saltwater crocodiles from areas of the river popular to tourists, these crocodiles do inhabit most of these river systems.

Within the town itself is a three-screen cinema complex which opened in 1998. There are two clubs in the town: The Katherine Club (Returned and Services League of Australia sub-branch), located in the Central Business District and Katherine Country Club in Katherine South. There are several restaurants and hotels (or resorts) that do offer lunch or dinner options.

=== Sport ===
The Katherine Sports Ground Complex, run by Katherine Town Council, is the main sporting facility and houses the Katherine Aquatic Centre including an olympic swimming pool, tennis club, four ovals (one with a pitch used for cricket and Australian rules football), a BMX track, a basketball court and rugby league and soccer fields. The complex also hosts equestrian sports and the Katherine and District Show Society. The town is also home to a nine-hole golf course, a fully equipped baseball diamond and a softball field.

Australian rules football is popular in the region with several local clubs, Katherine, Katherine South, Eastside, and Tindal football clubs competing in the Big Rivers Australian Football League (formerly the Katherine District Football League).

Further sporting amenities are provided at the Katherine Showgrounds: a rodeo arena, a polocrosse playing field, and an oval with grandstand facilities, often used for football matches. The Jim Jackson Racecourse is the home of the Katherine Turf Club and the annual Katherine Cup race meeting, which draws competitors and punters from across the Northern Territory.

The local rugby league competition is the Katherine Rugby League, and sanctions both Junior and Senior Rugby League matches. The season usually kicks off around March/April and runs through to Late August. A large facility owned by the YMCA, the Henry Scott Recreation Centre, is located at the Katherine Sports Ground Complex and contains a roller skating rink and gymnasium. It hosts regular recreational activities aimed at youth in the town such as dance classes. The venue also offers after school childcare and creche facilities. In addition, the YMCA hosts other activities such as Aqua Aerobics classes at the Katherine Aquatic Centre located adjacent to the Recreation Centre.

== Culture ==
=== Mimi Aboriginal Art and Craft ===
Mimi Aboriginal Art and Craft, located at 6 Pearce Street, is a 100% Aboriginal-owned community nonprofit art centre, established in 1978. Over fifty per cent of revenue from sales is paid to the artists, with the rest contributing to the running of the art centre. Artists represented there include Bill Yidumduma Harney.

The centre underwent an extensive renovation in 2021/2022, reopening in May 2022. Facilities, including professional gallery spaces and artists' studios, were improved, and more outdoor spaces added to enhance the visitor experience. Troppo Architects designed the refurbishments, in consultation with the Mimi Ngarrdalingi Aboriginal Corporation Board members, staff and member artists.

=== Music ===
The Katherine Country Music Muster Association was formed after the Katherine 1998 floods to raise money for the Katherine Historical Society Inc. Over the years, the Muster has hosted emerging local and national country music artists, such as Kasey Chambers. Unique Indigenous music and dances are also important to the region.

== Media ==
The Katherine Times is the local newspaper that issued weekly. Five broadcast television services operate in Katherine – commercial stations Imparja Television (callsign IMP-36), Seven Central (QQQ-31) and 10 Central (CDT-5), along with the Government-owned ABC TV (ABC8) and SBS TV (SBS6). Imparja Television has a commercial agreement with the Nine Network. Seven Central is an owned and operated station of the Seven Network. 10 Central transmits programming from the 10 Network. Katherine is served by both local and national radio and television services. The government-owned ABC provides 3 AM/FM broadcast radio stations: ABC local radio (ABC Katherine); and national networks ABC Radio National and ABC News Radio. Other national services including ABC Classic and Triple J are available via Digital television channels. The national Christian radio network Vision Radio broadcasts on 87.6 FM. Community stations are CAAMA, Mix 104.9 and 8KTR FM.

=== In popular culture ===
The Katherine Region was popularised by the novel We of the Never Never (1908) by Jeannie Gunn, the wife of a pioneering pastoralist in the late 1800s. A film version of the book was released in 1982. The feature film Jedda (1955) was partially filmed at Katherine Gorge; however, the last roll of negatives was destroyed in a plane crash on its way for developing in England and the scenes were re-shot at Kanangra Falls in the Blue Mountains. The Australian horror film Rogue, released in 2007, was partly filmed in Katherine Gorge. Katherine is also briefly mentioned in the 1986 film "Crocodile" Dundee. Katherine features heavily in Generation, a novel by Andrew MacAllan (a pseudonym of James Leasor).

== Notable people ==
Notable people from or who have lived in Katherine include:

- Jed Anderson, professional Australian rules footballer (born and raised in Katherine from 1994)
- Keidean Coleman, professional Australian rules footballer (born and raised in Katherine from 2000)
- Mick Dodson, Indigenous Australian advocate and Australian of the Year (born in Katherine 1950)
- Cadel Evans, former professional racing cyclist and mountainbiker who won the Tour de France in 2011 (born in Katherine 1977)
- Clyde Fenton, the first Flying Doctor with the moniker "Speed Gordon of the Territory Skies" (lived and operated in Katherine between 1934 and 1942)
- Alicia Janz, Australian rules footballer and netballer (born in Katherine in 1990)
- Leisel Jones, Olympic gold medal-winning swimmer (born in Katherine 1985)
- Luke Kelly, professional rugby league footballer (born in Katherine 1989)
- Bruce Litchfield, architect who designed and built early Katherine buildings
- Andrew McLeod, professional Australian rules footballer (grew up in Katherine in the 1980s)
- Malarndirri McCarthy, Indigenous Australian politician (born in Katherine 1970)
- Sam McMahon, an Australian politician for the Country Liberal Party and a Senator for the Northern Territory in the Parliament of Australia in 2019
- James McManus, professional rugby league footballer (grew up in Katherine in the 1990s)
- Olive O'Keeffe, a nurse who spent much of her career working in Katherine and much of that working alongside Clyde Fenton
- Brad Ottens, professional Australian rules footballer (grew up on a local cattle station)
- D'Arcy Short, professional cricketer (born in Katherine 1990)
- Mathew Sinclair, New Zealand Cricketer (born in Katherine 1975)
- C. W. Stoneking, Australian blues musician (born in Katherine 1974)
- Stephanie Talbot, Australian basketball player (born in Katherine 1994)
- Jim Zimin, pioneering farmer and inventor (lived in Katherine 1930–1934, 1936–1974)
- Matthew Hill (AFL Player)
- Jonas Johnson (NT Police Officer) born in Katherine 1980
- Jeremy Johnson (Northern Territory) born in Katherine 2006
