= Edith Falls =

Edith Falls Leliyn
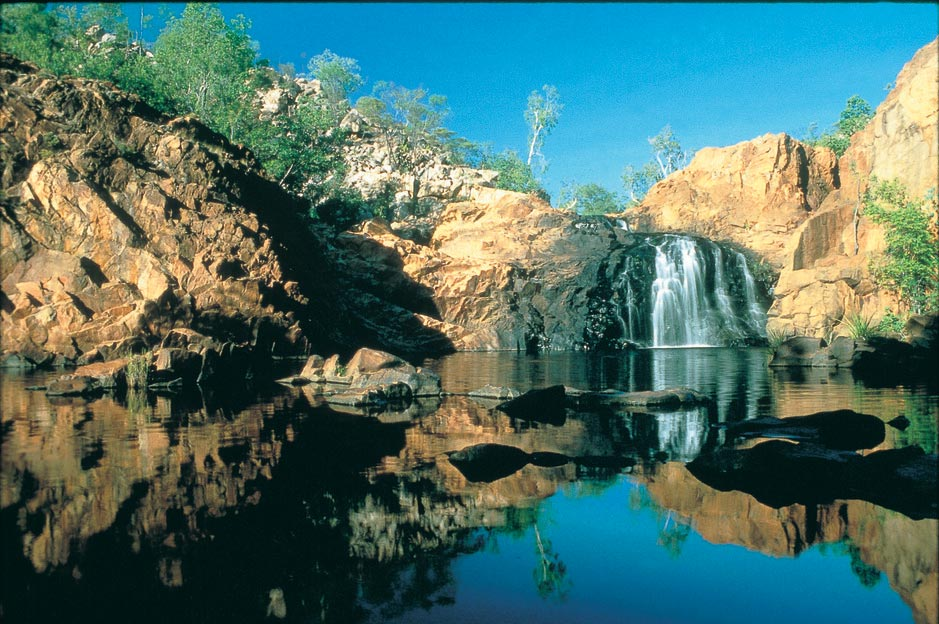
- Edith Falls after the wet season.

- Location within Northern Territory
- Location: Nitmiluk National Park, Northern Territory, Australia
- Coordinates: 14°10′S 132°10′E
- Type: Cascade
- Elevation: 176 metres (577 ft) AHD
- Total height: 8.7–12 metres (29–39 ft)
- Watercourse: Edith River, Australia

The Edith Falls (Aboriginal Jawoyn language: Leliyn) is a series of cascading waterfalls and pools on the Edith River in the Nitmiluk National Park, located approximately 60 kilometres (37 mi) north of Katherine, in the Northern Territory of Australia.

The falls descend from an elevation of 176 metres (577 ft) above sea level and range in height between 8.7–12 metres (29–39 ft). There are trails to the top of the escarpment, allowing visitors to view the waterfalls. Edith Falls is connected to Katherine Gorge via the 66-kilometre (41 mi) Jatbula walk. The traditional custodians of the land surrounding the waterfall are the Jawoyn people.

== See also ==
- List of waterfalls
- List of waterfalls in Australia
