= Nitmiluk National Park =

National park in the Northern Territory, Australia

- IUCN category II (national park)
- Katherine Gorge
- Location: Northern Territory
- Nearest city: Katherine
- Area: 2,946.64 km^{2} (1,137.70 sq mi)
- Established: 19 October 1977
- Visitors: 309,800 (in 2022)
- Governing body: Parks and Wildlife Commission of the Northern Territory; Aboriginal traditional land owners (the Jawoyn people)
- Website: Official website

Nitmiluk National Park is in the Northern Territory of Australia, 244 km southeast of Darwin, and 23 km northeast of the town of Katherine, around a series of gorges on the Katherine River and Edith Falls. Previously named Katherine Gorge National Park, its northern edge borders Kakadu National Park. The gorges and the surrounding landscape have great ceremonial significance to the local Jawoyn people, who are custodians of Nitmiluk National Park. In the Jawoyn language, Nitmiluk means "place of the cicada dreaming".

== Nitmiluk (Katherine) Gorge ==
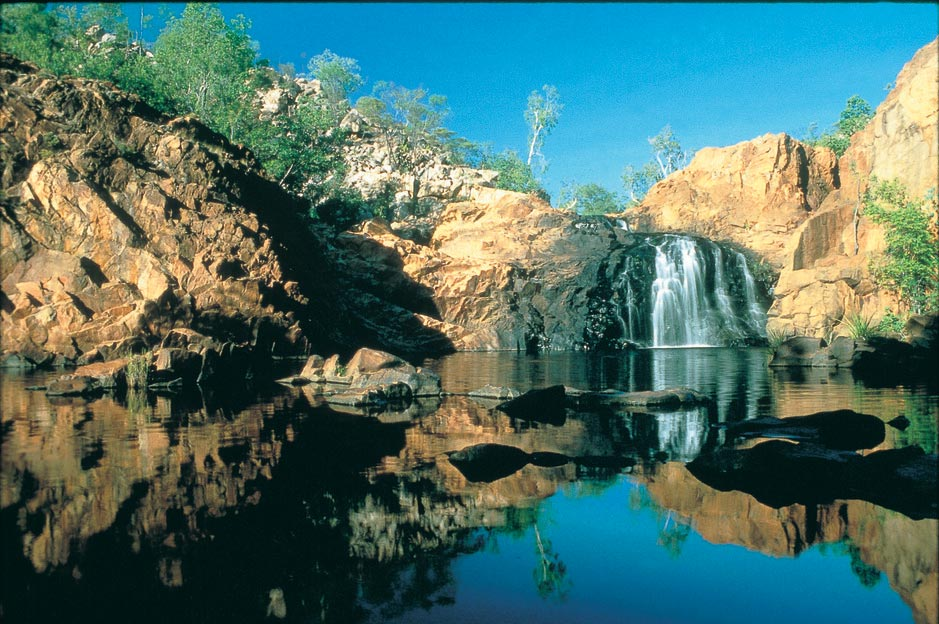
Edith Falls

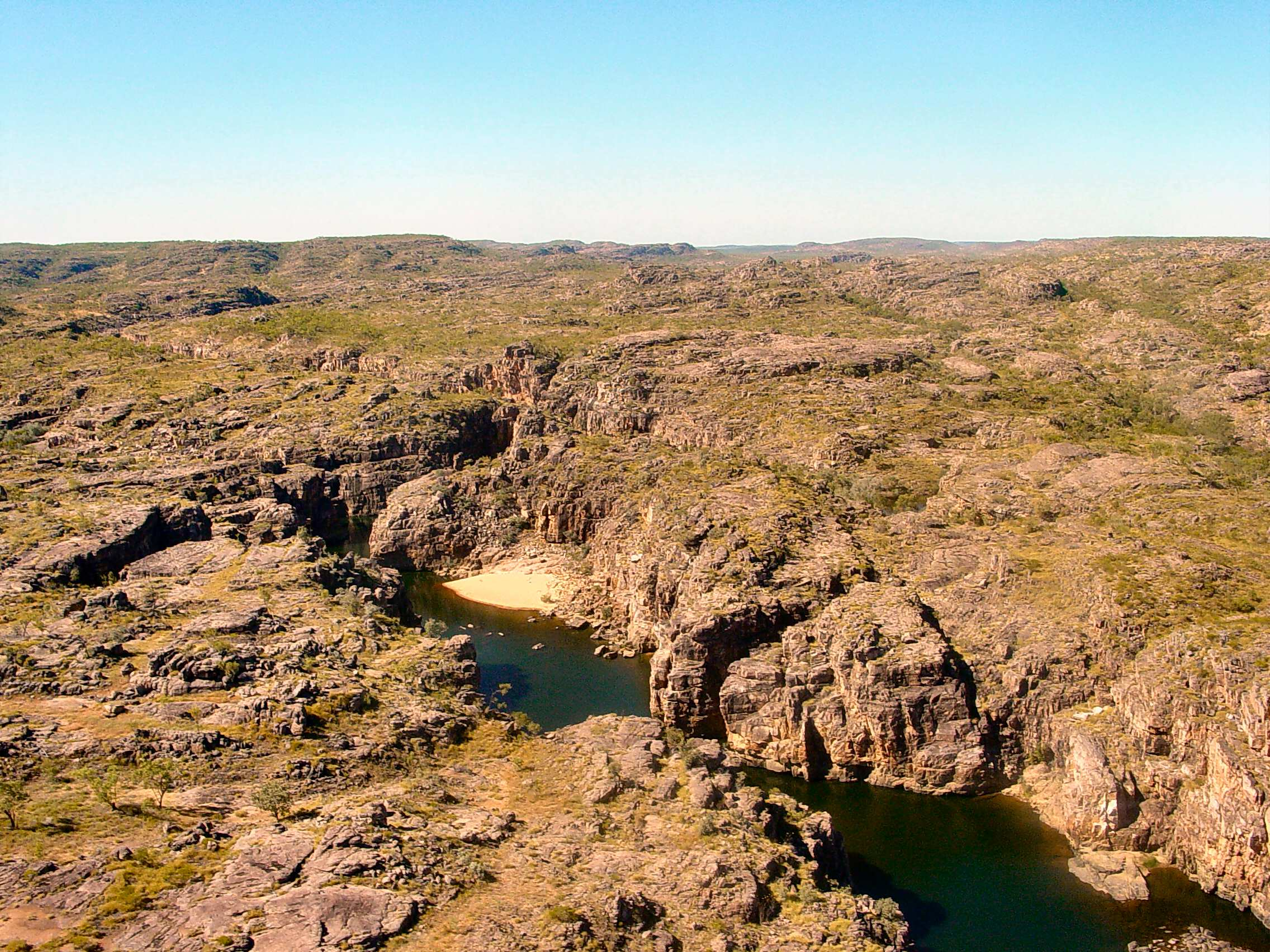
One of the gorges as seen from above

Nitmiluk Gorge, a deep gorge carved through ancient sandstone by the Katherine River, is the central attraction of the park. Nitmiluk Gorge is made up of thirteen gorges, with rapids and falls, and follow the Katherine River, which begins in Kakadu. During the Dry, roughly from April to October, the Nitmiluk Gorge waters are placid in most spots and ideal for swimming and canoeing. There may be freshwater crocodiles in most parts of the river, as they nest along the banks, but they are harmless to humans. Saltwater crocodiles regularly enter the river during the wet season, when the water levels are very high, and are subsequently removed and returned to the lower levels at the onset of the dry season. Thus, swimming in the wet season is prohibited. Cruises of various lengths go as far as the fifth gorge.

The gorge hosted the final challenge and the finish line of The Amazing Race Australia 4.

== Facilities ==
The gorges can be explored by canoe and flat bottomed boat. In the dry season the gorges become separated as the level of the river falls. They are interconnected in the wet. There is a visitor centre located at the Katherine Gorge, about 30 km east of the town of Katherine. Information displays are set up that explain the geology, landscape and aboriginal history of the national park. Tours can be booked at the centre or at the visitor centre in the town.

There are two permanent campgrounds where there are both tent and caravan sites. Both fires and bush camping are permitted. There are numerous walking tracks in the national park.

=== Jatbula Trail ===
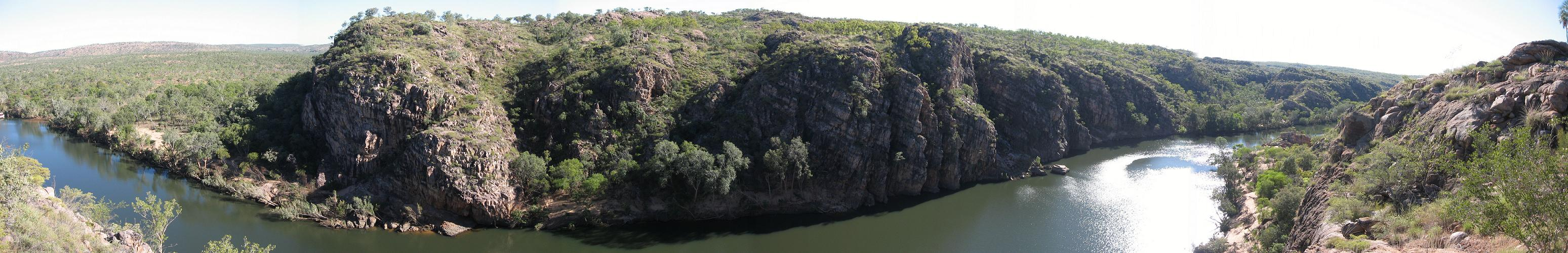
Panorama of Katherine Gorge

The Jatbula Trail follows the route travelled by generations of Jawoyn people between Katherine Gorge and Leliyn. It is named for Peter Jatbula, a man who was instrumental in securing land rights for his people and who walked this route with his family. Members of Peter Jatbula's family still live in the area today and continue to help look after country.

== Wildlife ==
Freshwater crocodiles are widely distributed along the river year-round. During the wet season, rises in water levels may allow saltwater crocodiles to enter the gorge, where they are caught and relocated to lower levels when the dry season begins. Birds that can be seen include ospreys, red-tailed black cockatoos, great bowerbirds, white-gaped honeyeaters and red-winged parrots. Part of the Yinberrie Hills Important Bird Area, identified as such by BirdLife International because of its importance for endangered Gouldian finches, lies in the park.

== See also ==
- Protected areas of the Northern Territory
