= Katherine River =

Coordinates: 14°39′S 131°42′E

Katherine River Katherrain Riba
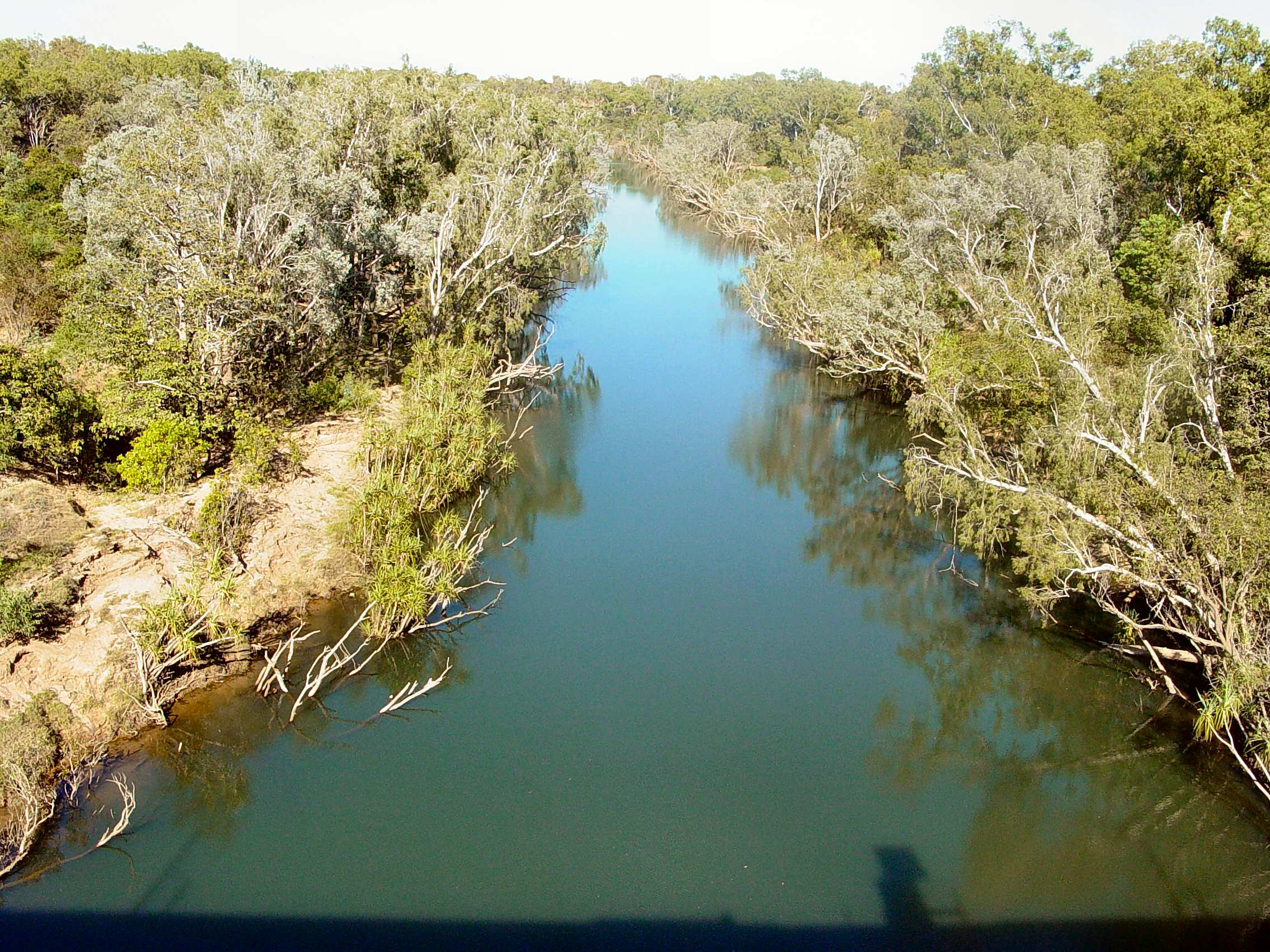
- Katherine River at the town of Katherine during the dry season

- Location within Northern Territory
- Etymology: Catherine Chambers, second daughter of James Chambers

Location
- Country: Australia
- Territory: Northern Territory

Physical characteristics
- Mouth: Daly River
- Length: 328 kilometres (204 mi)

Katherine River (/ˈkæθɹɪn/; Australian Kriol: Katherrain Riba) is located in the Northern Territory, Australia. Its headwaters are in Nitmiluk National Park, it flows through the town of Katherine, and is a major tributary of the Daly River. The Katherine River drops around 384m over its 328 km length.

== History ==
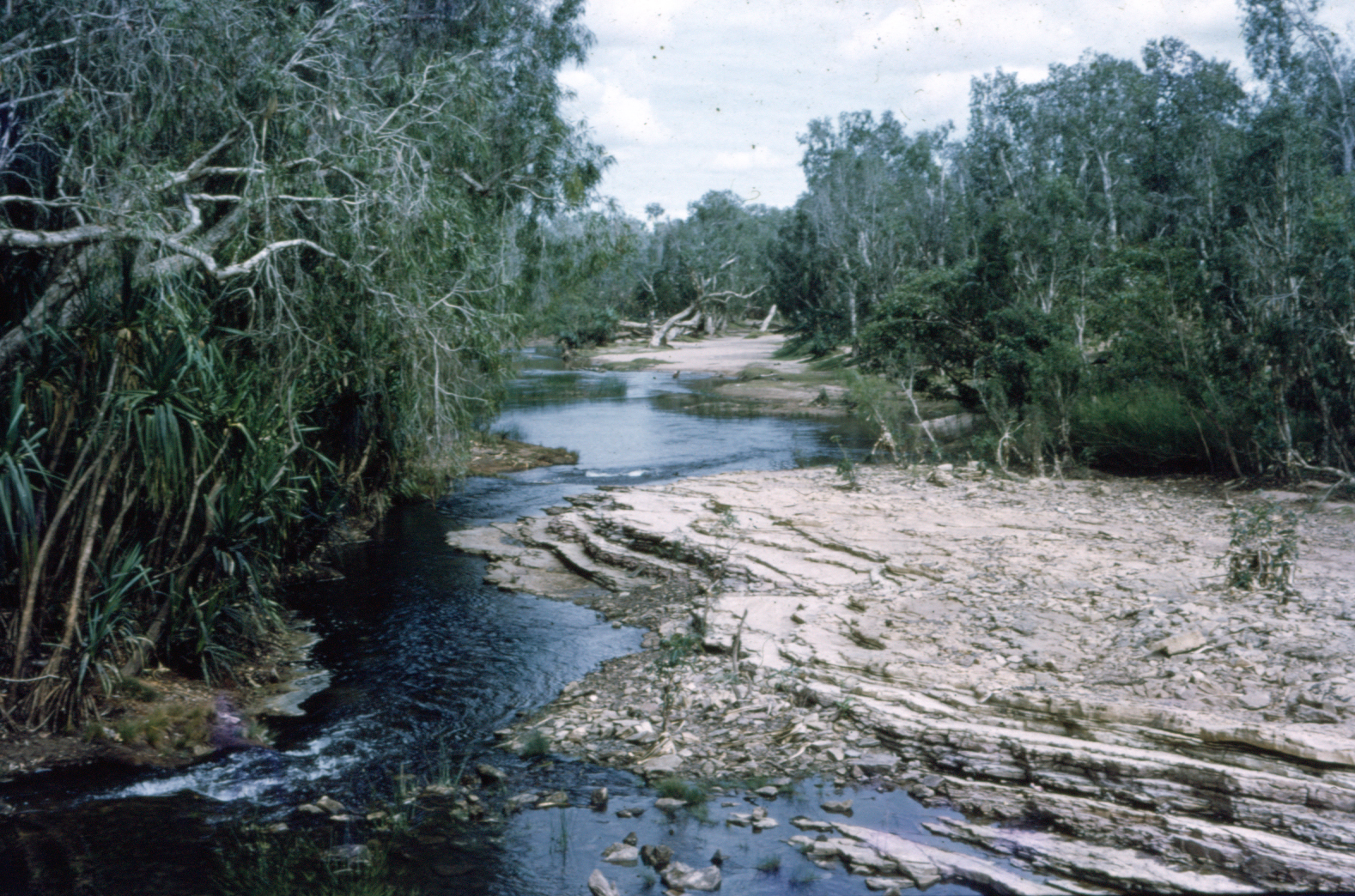
Katherine Low Level View in June 1962

The first European to see and name the river was the Scottish explorer John McDouall Stuart on 4 July 1862, who named it Katherine after Catherine Chambers, the second daughter of expedition sponsor, the pastoralist James Chambers. The major town Katherine was named after the river.

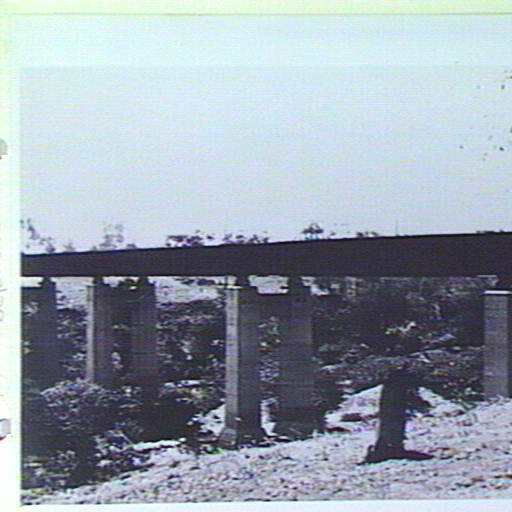
Katherine River Bridge (opened 1929) in 1933

The Katherine River in 1946

In late January 1998, heavy rain associated with Cyclone Les raised the level of the river by more than 20 metres and flooded a large part of Katherine town. A more recent flood on 6 April 2006 caused a state of emergency to be declared. During this event the river peaked at a height of just below 19 metres at the Katherine bridge on the Stuart Highway.

== Wildlife ==
Freshwater crocodiles inhabit the entire river, but while saltwater crocodiles are capable of travelling far upstream, no attacks have been recorded.

== See also ==
- List of rivers of Australia § Northern Territory
