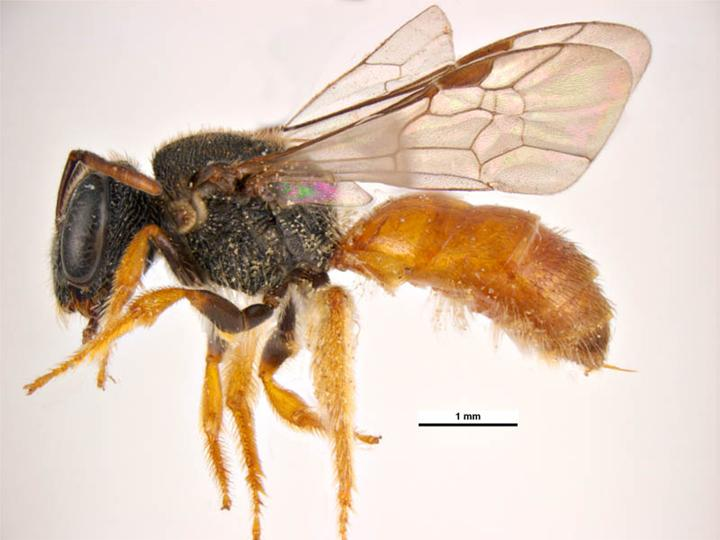
- Female
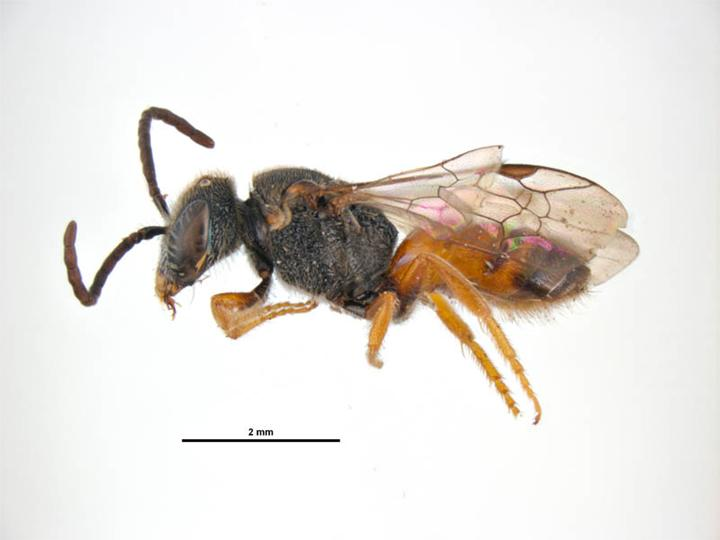
- Male

Scientific classification
- Kingdom: Animalia
- Phylum: Arthropoda
- Clade: Pancrustacea
- Class: Insecta
- Order: Hymenoptera
- Family: Halictidae
- Genus: Lasioglossum
- Species: L. ewarti

Binomial name
- Lasioglossum ewarti (Cockerell, 1910)

Synonyms
- Halictus ewarti Cockerell, 1910

= Lasioglossum ewarti =

Species of bee

Lasioglossum ewarti, or Lasioglossum (Evyloides) ewarti, is a species of bee in the family Halictidae and subfamily Halictinae. It is endemic to Australia. It was described by British-American entomologist Theodore Dru Alison Cockerell in 1910.

== Description ==
Female body length is about 7 mm. Integumental colouration is mainly black, the abdomen bright chestnut-red, the hair pale yellowish-brown.

== Distribution and habitat ==
The species occurs in tropical north-eastern Australia. The type locality is Kuranda, Queensland.

== Behaviour ==
The adults are flying mellivores. Flowering plants visited by the bees include Lophostemon grandiflorus.
