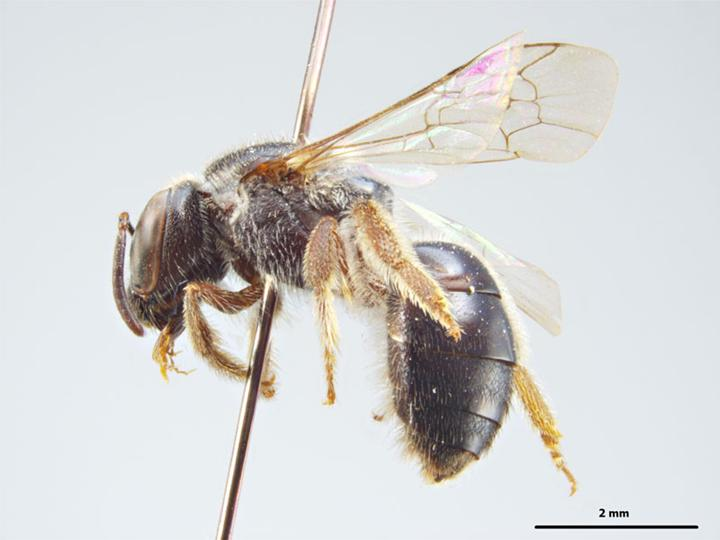
- Female
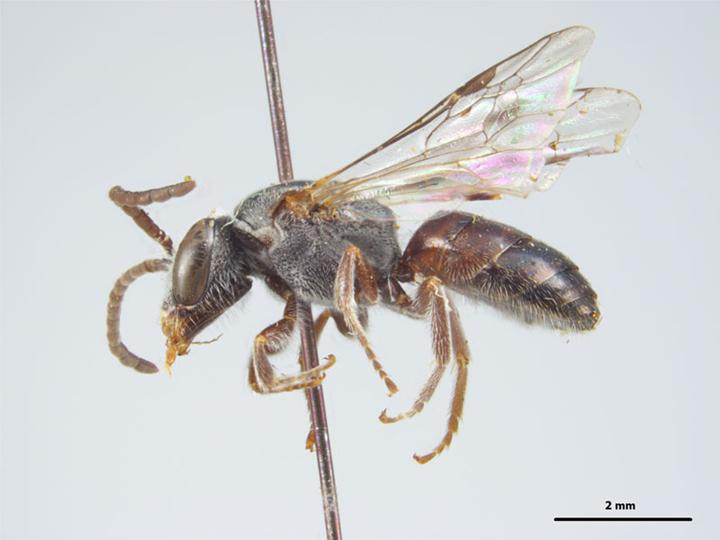
- Male

Scientific classification
- Kingdom: Animalia
- Phylum: Arthropoda
- Clade: Pancrustacea
- Class: Insecta
- Order: Hymenoptera
- Family: Halictidae
- Genus: Lasioglossum
- Species: L. forresti

Binomial name
- Lasioglossum forresti (Cockerell, 1906)

Synonyms
- Halictus forresti Cockerell, 1906; Halictus scutellatus Friese, 1924; Halictus flavopunctata Friese, 1924

= Lasioglossum forresti =

Species of bee

Lasioglossum forresti, or Lasioglossum (Ctenonomia) forresti, is a species of bee in the family Halictidae and subfamily Halictinae. It is endemic to Australia. It was described by British-American entomologist Theodore Dru Alison Cockerell in 1906.

== Description ==
Male body length is about 6 mm. Integumental colouration is mainly black, with yellow and reddish markings.

== Distribution and habitat ==
The species occurs in eastern Australia. Type localities include Mackay, Queensland.

== Behaviour ==
The adults are flying mellivores. Flowering plants visited by the bees include Lophostemon suaveolens and Atalaya hemiglauca, as well as Cassia, Jacksonia, Eucalyptus, Tristaniopsis, Bursaria, Alphitonia and Xanthorrhoea species.

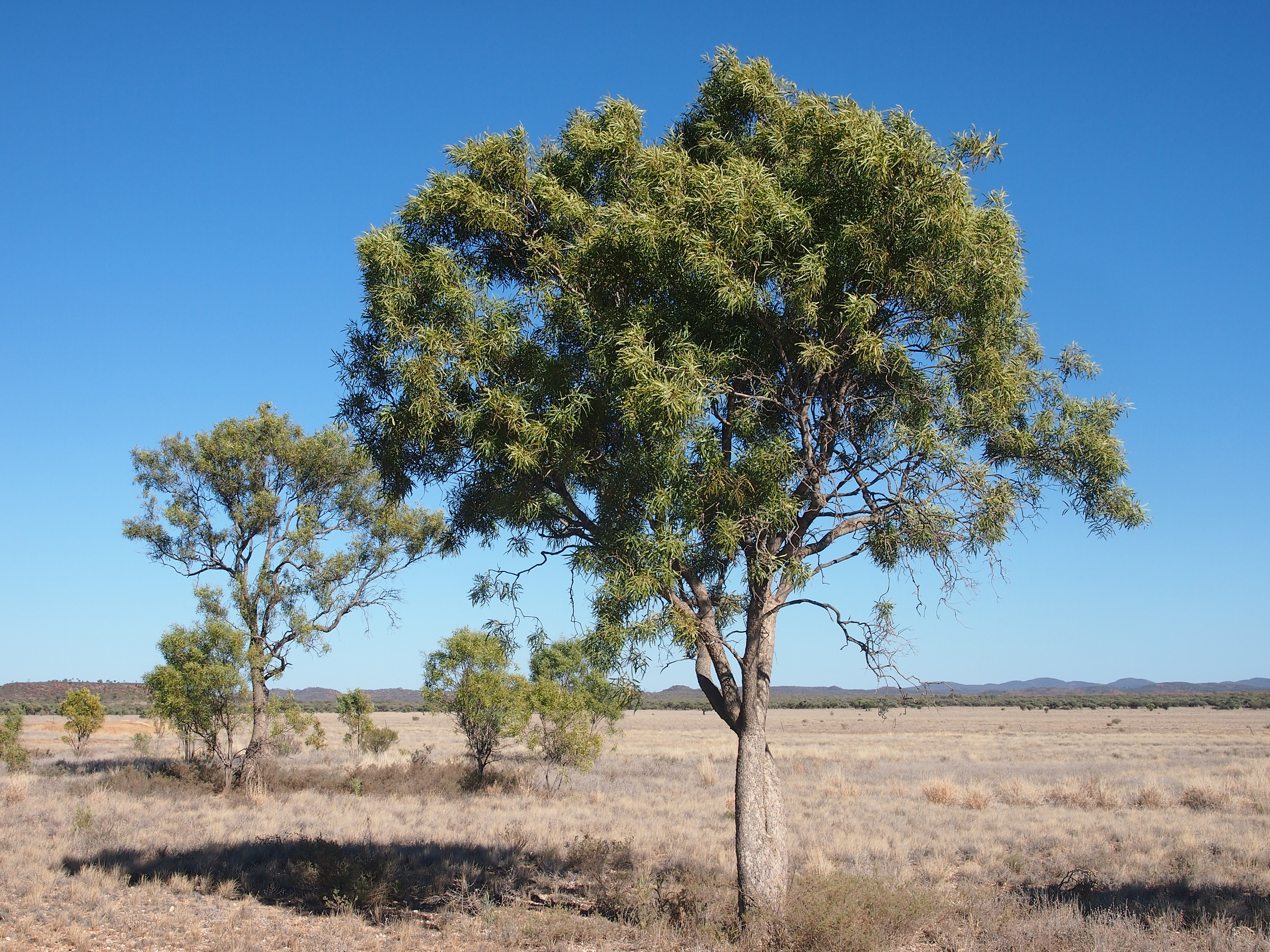
Atalaya hemiglauca (whitewood), a forage plant of the bees

Flowers of Atalaya hemiglauca
