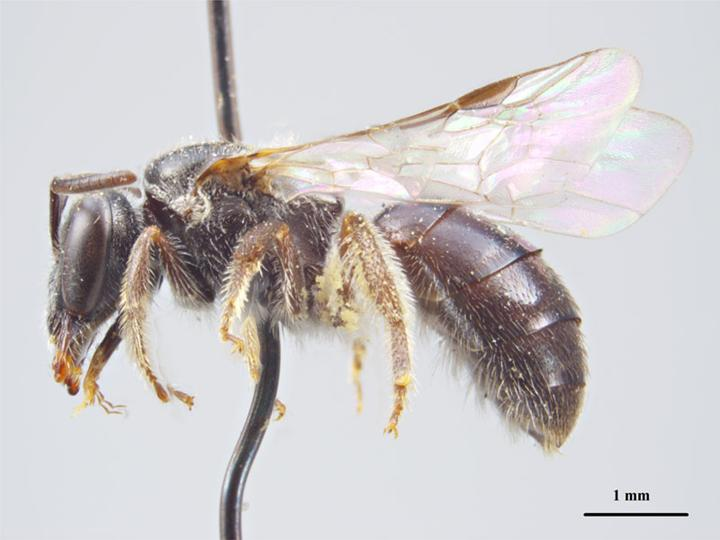
- Female
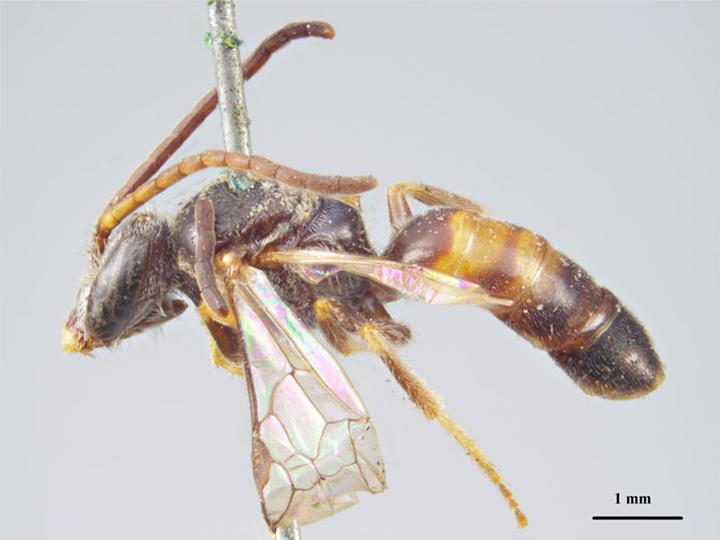
- Male

Scientific classification
- Kingdom: Animalia
- Phylum: Arthropoda
- Clade: Pancrustacea
- Class: Insecta
- Order: Hymenoptera
- Family: Halictidae
- Genus: Lasioglossum
- Species: L. sturti

Binomial name
- Lasioglossum sturti (Cockerell, 1906)

Synonyms
- Halictus sturti Cockerell, 1906; Halictus cyclurus Cockerell, 1915; Halictus globularis Friese, 1924

= Lasioglossum sturti =

Species of bee

Lasioglossum sturti, or Lasioglossum (Ctenonomia) sturti, is a species of bee in the family Halictidae and subfamily Halictinae. It is endemic to Australia. It was described by British-American entomologist Theodore Dru Alison Cockerell in 1906.

== Description ==
Female body length is about 6 mm. Integumental colouration is glossy black.

== Distribution and habitat ==
The species occurs in Queensland. Type localities include Mackay and Tamborine Mountain.

== Behaviour ==
The adults are flying mellivores. Flowering plants visited by the bees include Lophostemon suaveolens as well as Jacksonia species.

Flowers of Lophostemon suaveolens (swamp box), a forage plant of the bees
