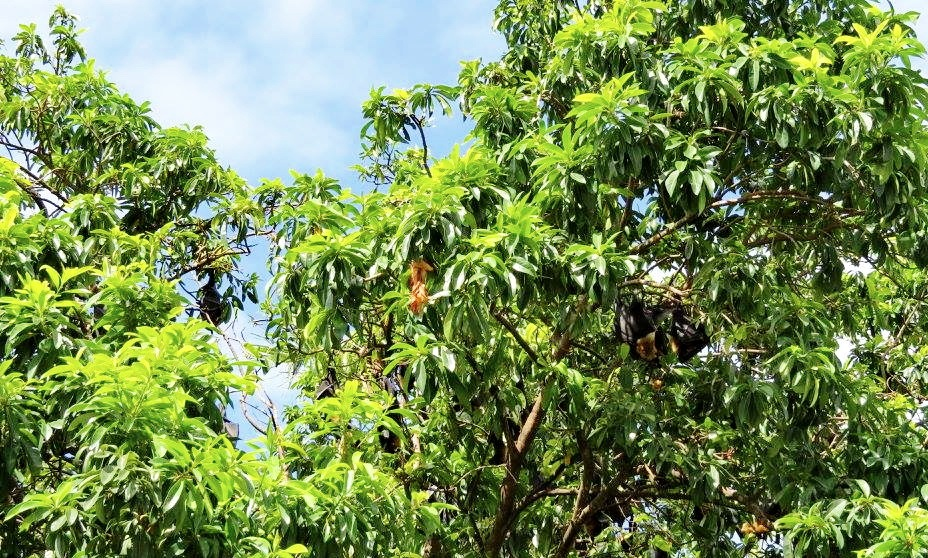

Conservation status
- Least Concern (IUCN 3.1)

Scientific classification
- Kingdom: Plantae
- Clade: Tracheophytes
- Clade: Angiosperms
- Clade: Eudicots
- Clade: Rosids
- Order: Myrtales
- Family: Myrtaceae
- Genus: Lophostemon
- Species: L. confertus

Binomial name
- Lophostemon confertus (R.Br.) Peter G.Wilson & J.T.Waterh.

Synonyms
- Lophostemon arborescens Schott; Melaleuca conferta (R.Br.) Steud.; Tristania conferta R.Br.; Tristania conferta Griff. Misapplied; Tristania depressa A.Cunn.; Tristania griffithii Kurz; Tristania macrophylla A.Cunn.; Tristania subverticillata H.Wendl.

= Lophostemon confertus =

Species of tree in the myrtle family

Lophostemon confertus (syn. Tristania conferta) is an evergreen tree native to Australia, though it is cultivated in the United States and elsewhere. Common names include brush box, Queensland box, Brisbane box, pink box, box scrub, and vinegartree. Its natural range in Australia is northeast New South Wales and coastal Queensland but it is commonly used as a street tree in Sydney, Melbourne, Perth and other cities in eastern Australia.

== Description ==
In the wild its habitat ranges from moist open forest and rainforest ecotones, where it might reach heights of 40 metres or more, to coastal headlands where it acquires a stunted, wind-sheared habit. Dome-like in shape, it has a denser foliage with dark green, leathery leaves and hence provides more shade than eucalyptus trees. Moreover, it is considered safer than eucalypts because it rarely sheds limbs.

== Habitat ==
It is considered useful as a street tree due to its disease and pest resilience, its high tolerance for smog, drought and poor drainage, and its minimal maintenance needs. It often requires lopping to accommodate overhead power lines, but survives pruning well. In form it is used as a replacement for the weedy camphor laurel (Cinnamomum camphora) while having a low potential for being weedy itself.

== Taxonomy ==
The species was formally described in 1812 by Scottish botanist Robert Brown, based on plant material collected from the Hunter River region in New South Wales. Brown named the species Tristania conferta. The species was transferred to the genus Lophostemon in 1982.

== Gallery ==
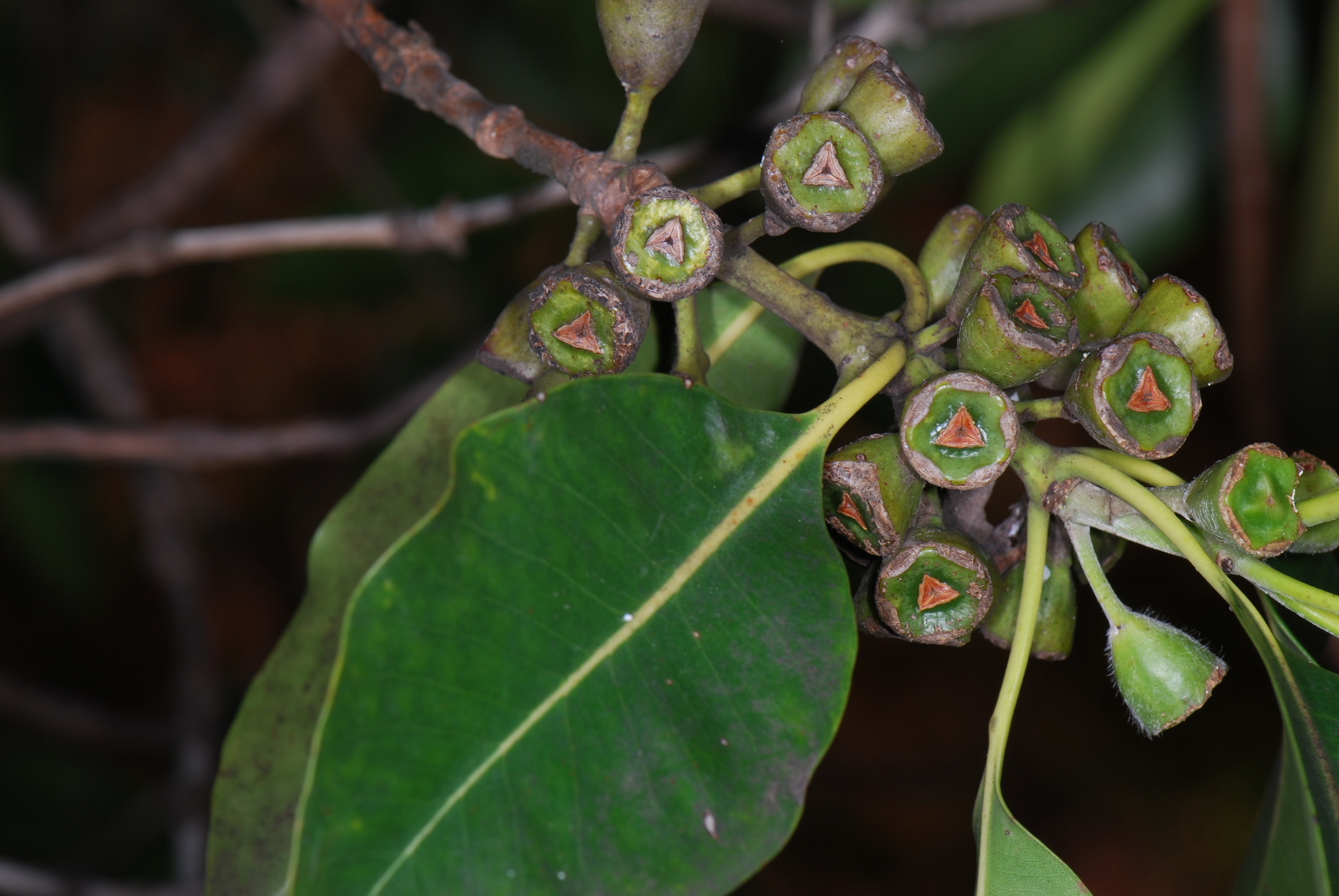
Unripe fruits

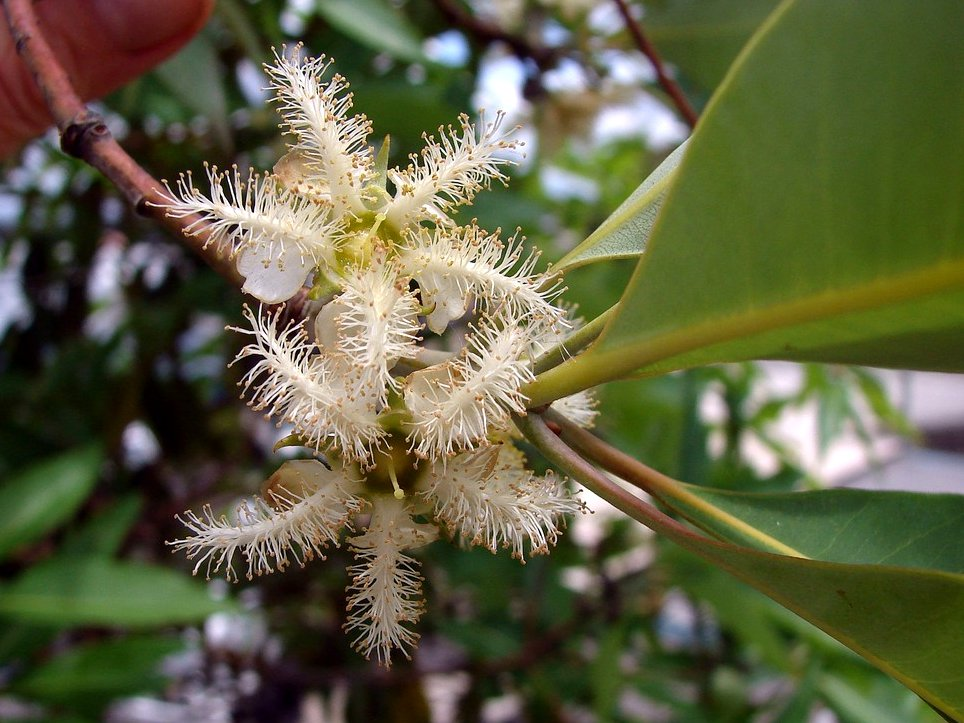
Flowers

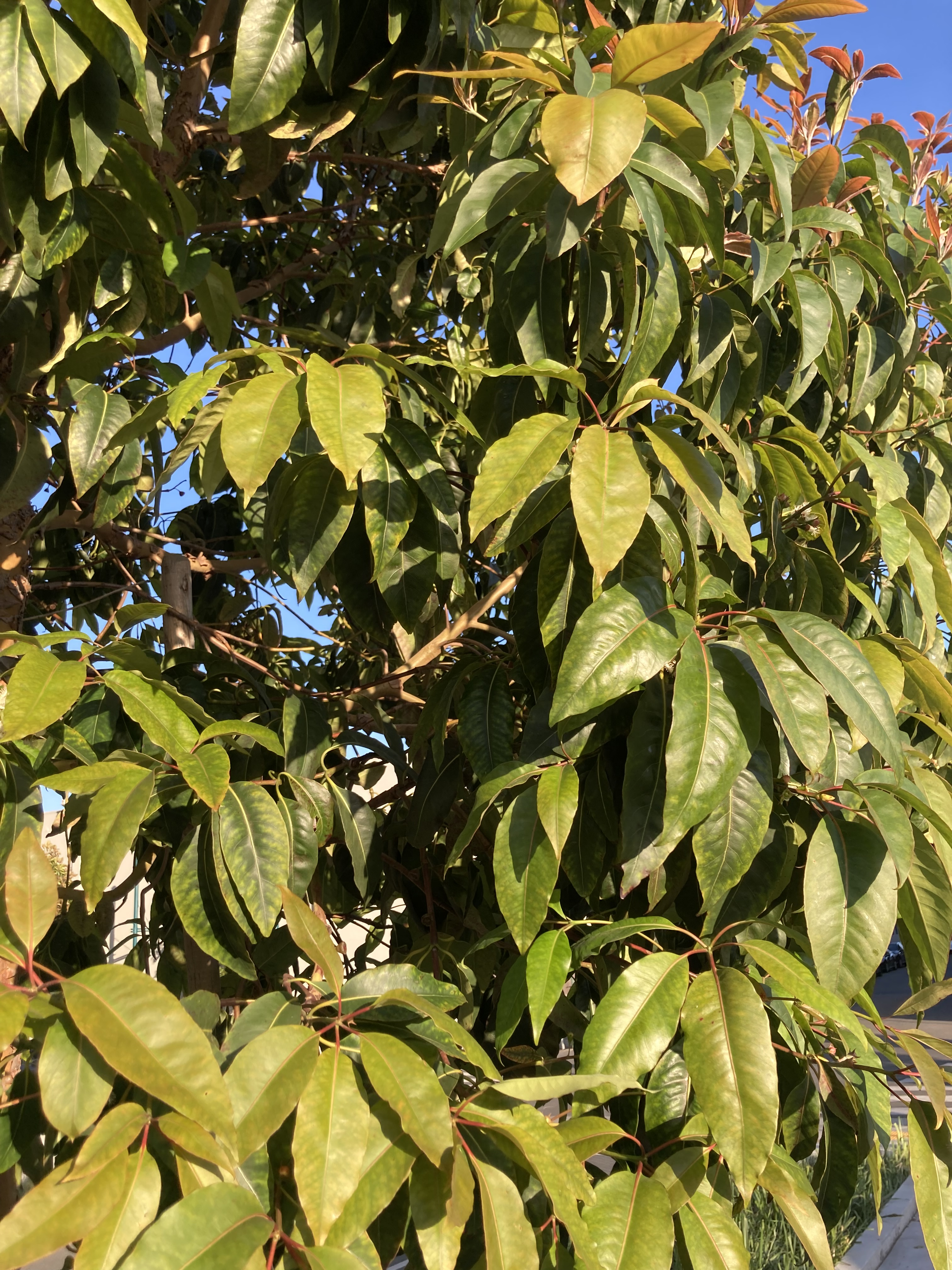
Detail of the leaves

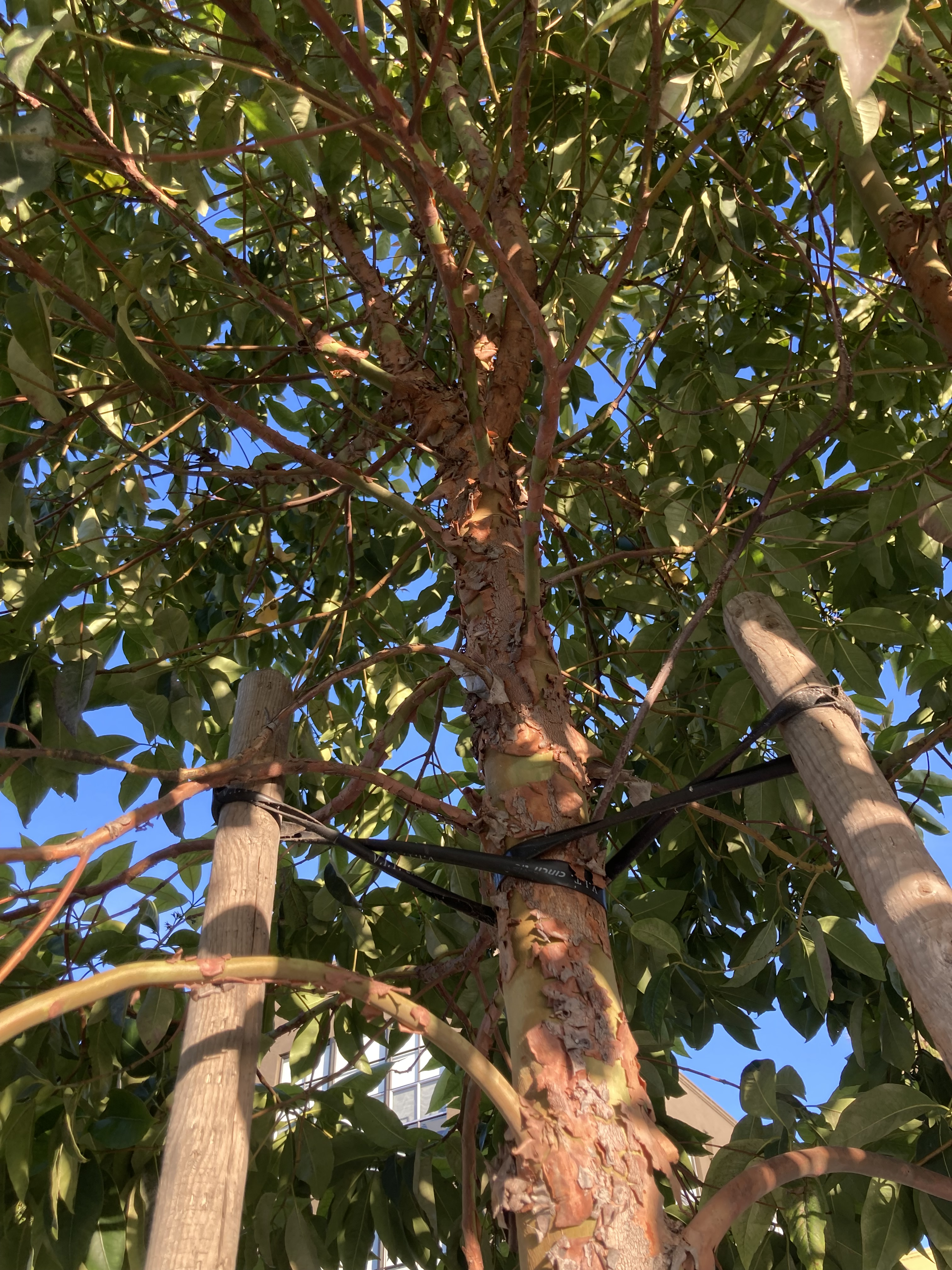
Looking up through the branches.

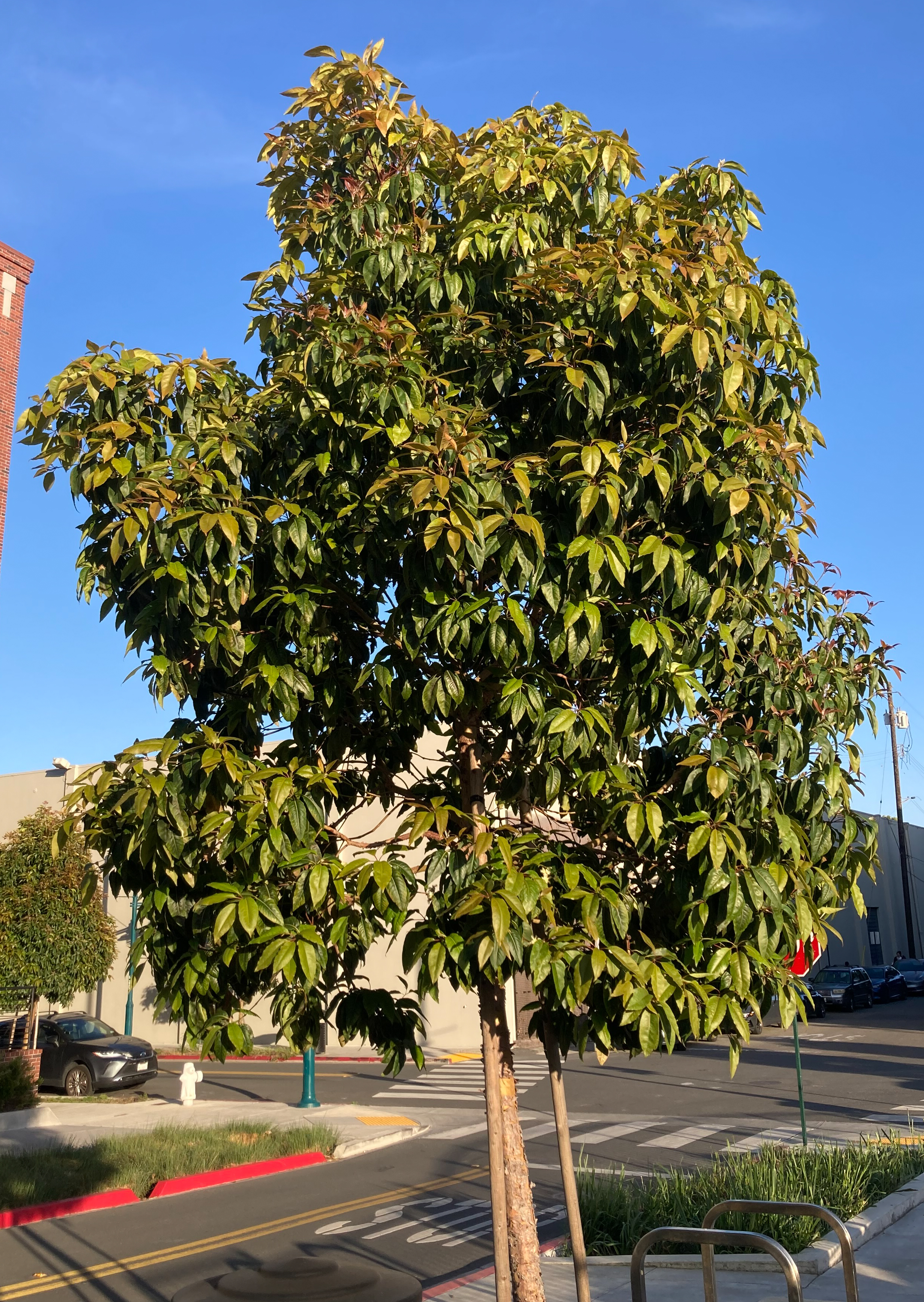
A specimen as a street tree in Emeryville, CA.

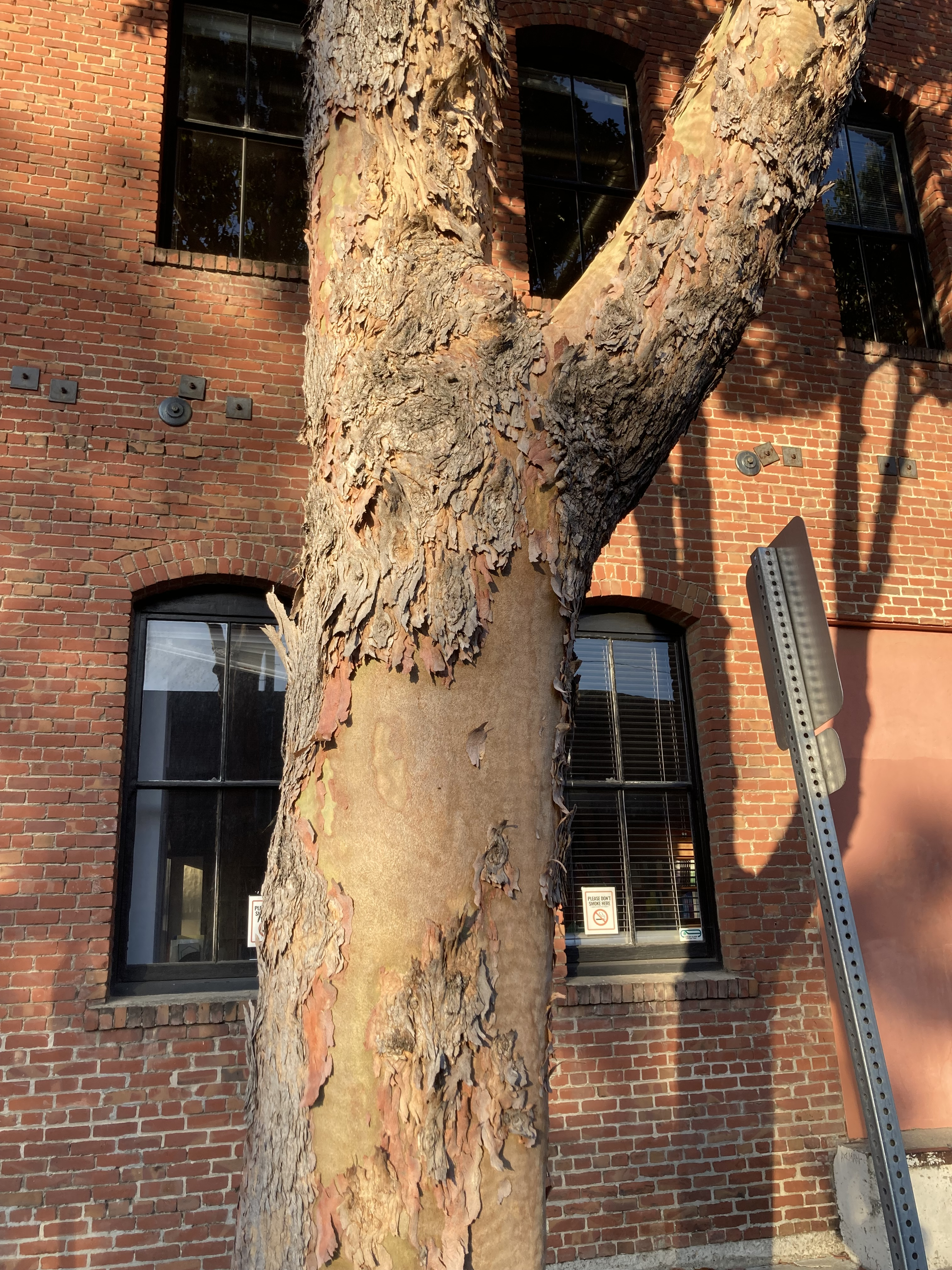
Mature bark
