= Lophostemon lactifluus =

Conservation status
- Data Deficient (IUCN 3.1)

Scientific classification
- Kingdom: Plantae
- Clade: Tracheophytes
- Clade: Angiosperms
- Clade: Eudicots
- Clade: Rosids
- Order: Myrtales
- Family: Myrtaceae
- Genus: Lophostemon
- Species: L. lactifluus

Binomial name
- Lophostemon lactifluus (F.Muell.) Peter G.Wilson & J.T.Waterh.

Synonyms
- Tristania lactiflua F.Muell.

Species of tree

Lophostemon lactifluus, commonly known as swamp mahogany or milky box, is a tree or shrub of the family Myrtaceae native to northern Western Australia and the Northern Territory in northern Australia.
