= Whiteodendron =

Conservation status
- Least Concern (IUCN 3.1)

Scientific classification
- Kingdom: Plantae
- Clade: Tracheophytes
- Clade: Angiosperms
- Clade: Eudicots
- Clade: Rosids
- Order: Myrtales
- Family: Myrtaceae
- Subfamily: Myrtoideae
- Tribe: Lophostemoneae
- Genus: Whiteodendron; Steenis
- Species: W. moultonianum

Binomial name
- Whiteodendron moultonianum (W.W.Sm.) Steenis

Synonyms
- Tristania moultoniana W.W.Sm

Genus of flowering plants

Whiteodendron is a genus of flowering plant in family Myrtaceae described as a genus in 1952. It contains only one known species, Whiteodendron moultonianum, a tree endemic to Borneo. It is a large canopy tree, reaching up to 40 metres tall with a trunk up to 70 cm in diameter. It is locally common in mixed dipterocarp rain forest, on low hills with leached yellow sand and sandy clay soils, up to 450 metres elevation. It also grows in disturbed forests and secondary vegetation.
