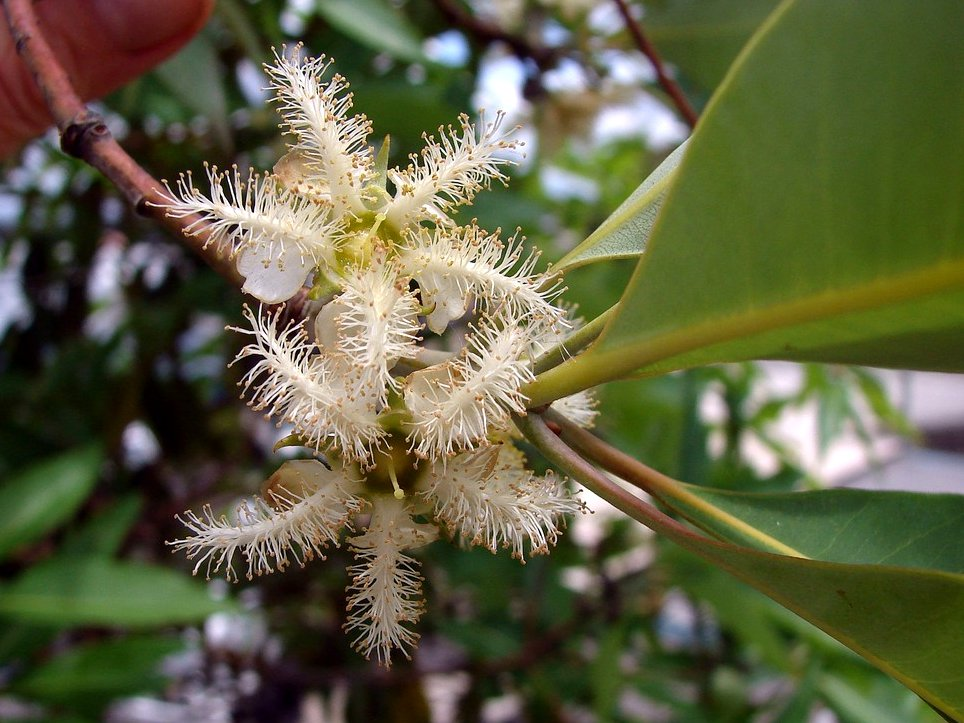
- Lophostemon confertus

Scientific classification
- Kingdom: Plantae
- Clade: Tracheophytes
- Clade: Angiosperms
- Clade: Eudicots
- Clade: Rosids
- Order: Myrtales
- Family: Myrtaceae
- Subfamily: Myrtoideae
- Tribe: Lophostemoneae
- Genus: Lophostemon; Schott

Type species
- Lophostemon arborescens Schott

= Lophostemon =

Genus of trees

Lophostemon ('lophos' - crest, 'stemon' - stamen) is a genus of 4 species of evergreen trees in the myrtle and clove family Myrtaceae. All four species are native to Australia, with one extending to New Guinea. The genus was first described in 1830 but not widely recognised until the 1980s. All four species were previously included in the related genus Tristania.

L. confertus, is a familiar tree to many people living along the east coast of Australia, where it known colloquially as the brush box. Quite frequently, it has been planted as a street tree, a role it isn't suited for as it grows to 30 metres in height and quite often suffers lopping due to obstructing overhead power lines.

Lophostemon species are used as food plants by the larvae of some Lepidoptera species, including Aenetus ligniveren.

== Species ==
As of April 2025, Plants of the World Online accepts the following four species:

- Lophostemon confertus (R.Br.) Peter G.Wilson & J.T.Waterh. – Queensland, New South Wales
- Lophostemon grandiflorus (Benth.) Peter G.Wilson & J.T.Waterh. – Queensland, Northern Territory, Western Australia
- Lophostemon lactifluus (F.Muell.) Peter G.Wilson & J.T.Waterh. – Northern Territory, Western Australia
- Lophostemon suaveolens (Sol. ex Gaertn.) Peter G.Wilson & J.T.Waterh. – Queensland, New South Wales, New Guinea
