= Kjellbergiodendron =

Conservation status
- Least Concern (IUCN 3.1)

Scientific classification
- Kingdom: Plantae
- Clade: Tracheophytes
- Clade: Angiosperms
- Clade: Eudicots
- Clade: Rosids
- Order: Myrtales
- Family: Myrtaceae
- Subfamily: Myrtoideae
- Tribe: Lophostemoneae
- Genus: Kjellbergiodendron; Burret
- Species: K. celebicum

Binomial name
- Kjellbergiodendron celebicum (Koord.) Merr.

Synonyms
- Xanthostemon celebicus Koord.; Tristania celebica Koord.-Schum., name published without description; Tristania anacardiifolia Ridl.; Kjellbergiodendron hylogeiton Burret; Kjellbergiodendron limnogeiton Burret

Genus of flowering plants

Kjellbergiodendron is a genus of the botanical family Myrtaceae, first described as a genus in 1936. It contains only one known species, Kjellbergiodendron celebicum, endemic to the Island of Sulawesi in Indonesia.
