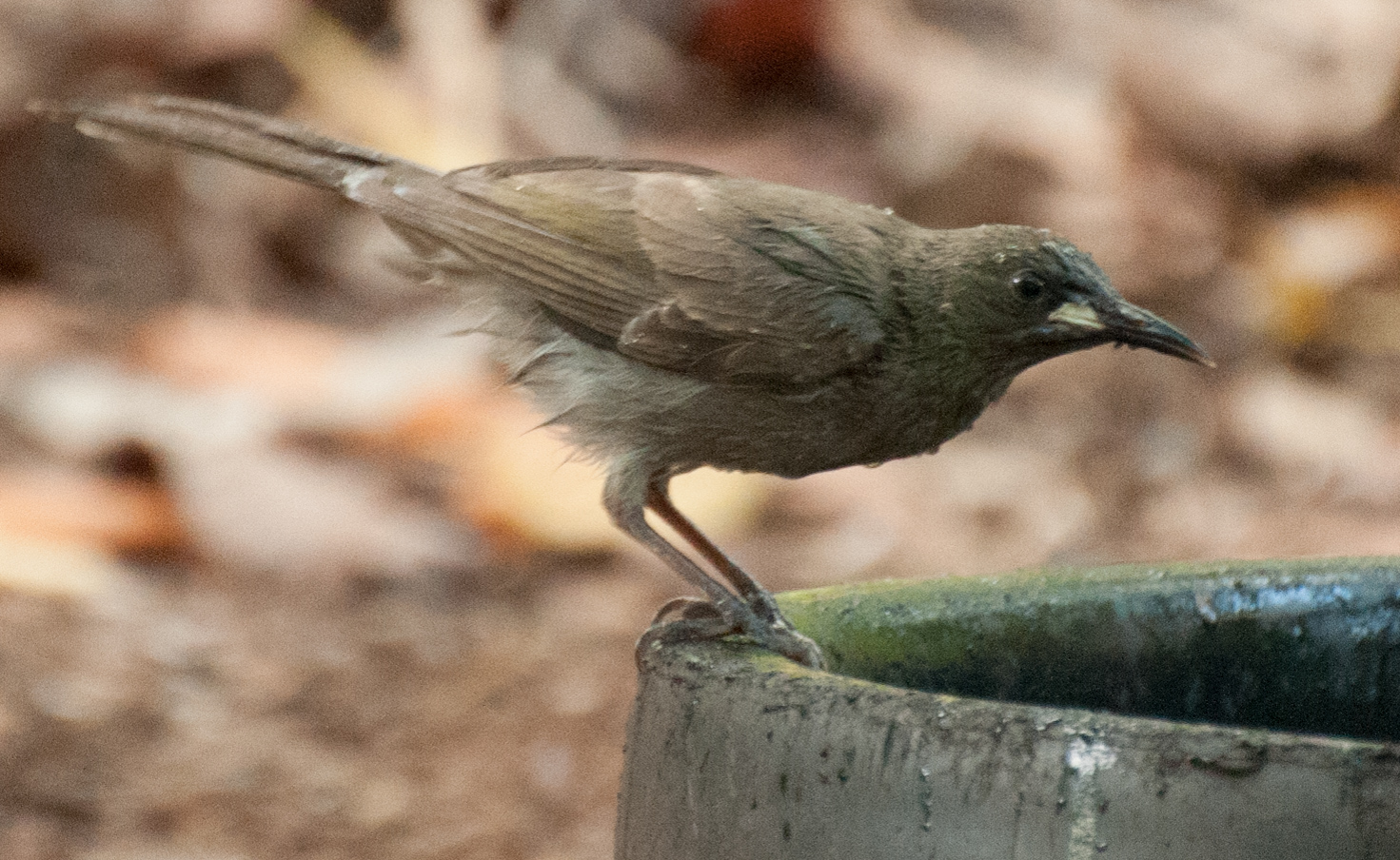

Conservation status
- Least Concern (IUCN 3.1)

Scientific classification
- Kingdom: Animalia
- Phylum: Chordata
- Class: Aves
- Order: Passeriformes
- Family: Meliphagidae
- Genus: Stomiopera
- Species: S. unicolor

Binomial name
- Stomiopera unicolor (Gould, 1843)

Synonyms
- Lichenostomus unicolor

= White-gaped honeyeater =

Species of bird

The white-gaped honeyeater (Stomiopera unicolor) is a species of bird in the family Meliphagidae. It is endemic to Australia.

Its natural habitats are subtropical or tropical moist lowland forests and subtropical or tropical mangrove forests.

The white-gaped honeyeater was previously placed in the genus Lichenostomus, but was moved to Stomiopera after a molecular phylogenetic analysis published in 2011 showed that the original genus was polyphyletic.
