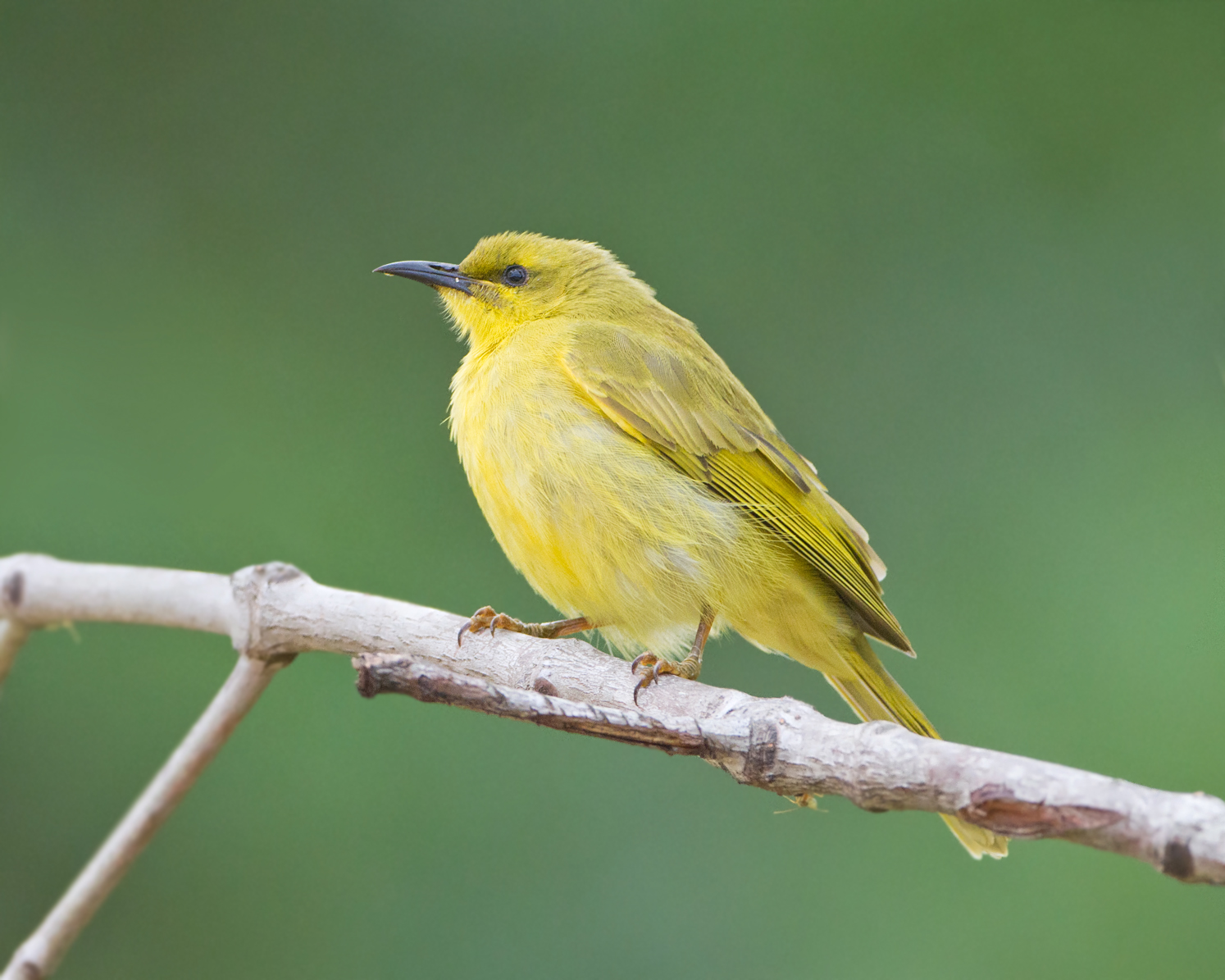

Conservation status
- Least Concern (IUCN 3.1)

Scientific classification
- Kingdom: Animalia
- Phylum: Chordata
- Class: Aves
- Order: Passeriformes
- Family: Meliphagidae
- Genus: Stomiopera
- Species: S. flava

Binomial name
- Stomiopera flava (Gould, 1843)

Synonyms
- Lichenostomus flavus

= Yellow honeyeater =

Species of bird

The yellow honeyeater (Stomiopera flava) is a species of bird in the family Meliphagidae. It is endemic to Australia.

== Overview ==
Its natural habitats are tropical and subtropical moist lowland forest and mangrove forest.

The yellow honeyeater hovers in front of the spectacular flowers of the bottlebrush orchid (Coelandria smillieae), which appear in northern Queensland between August and November, while feeding upon the nectar and pollinating the flowers.

The yellow honeyeater was previously placed in the genus Lichenostomus, but was moved to Stomiopera after a molecular phylogenetic analysis, published in 2011 showed that the original genus was polyphyletic.

== Gallery ==
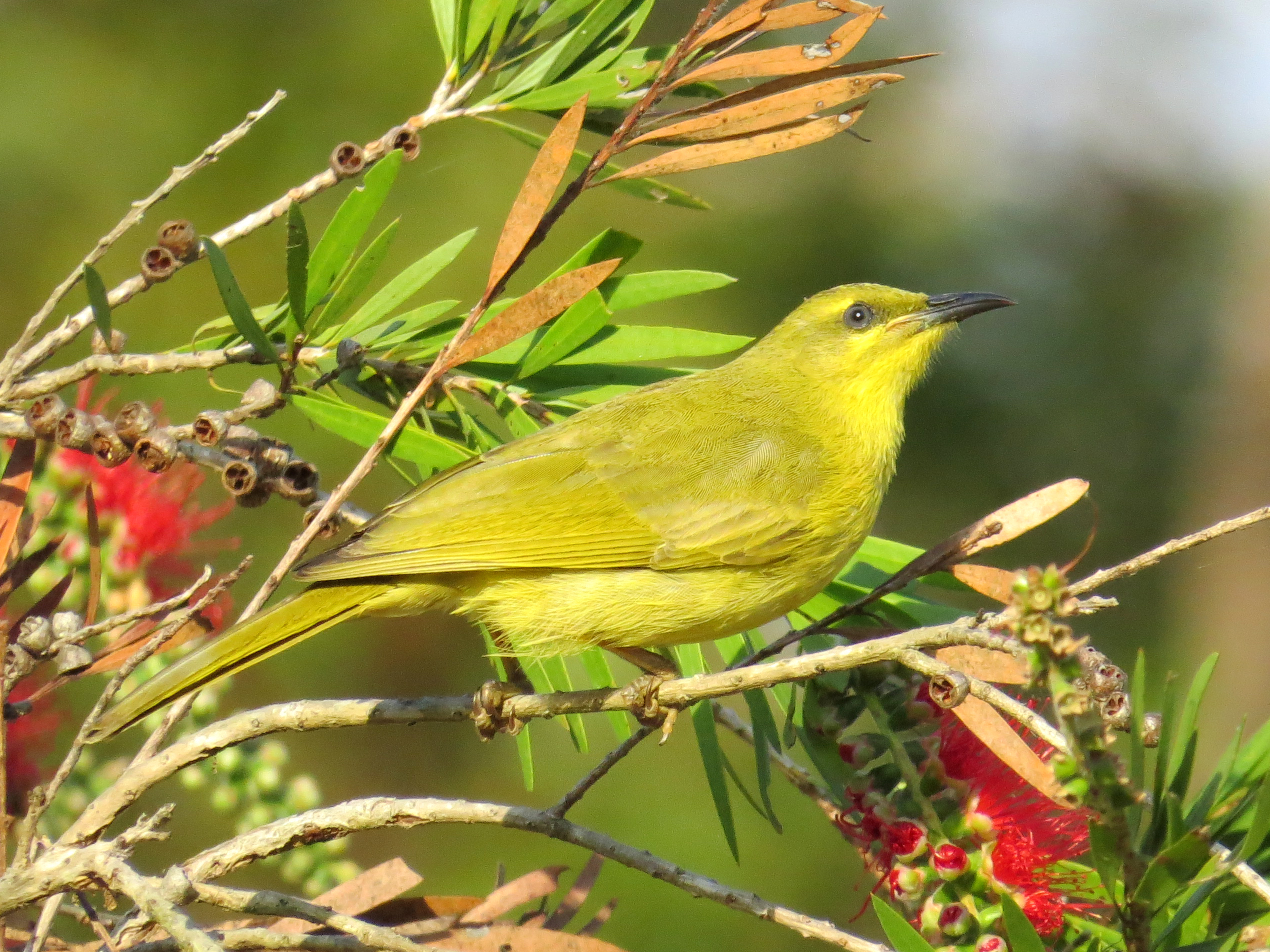
Yellow honeyeater north Queensland.

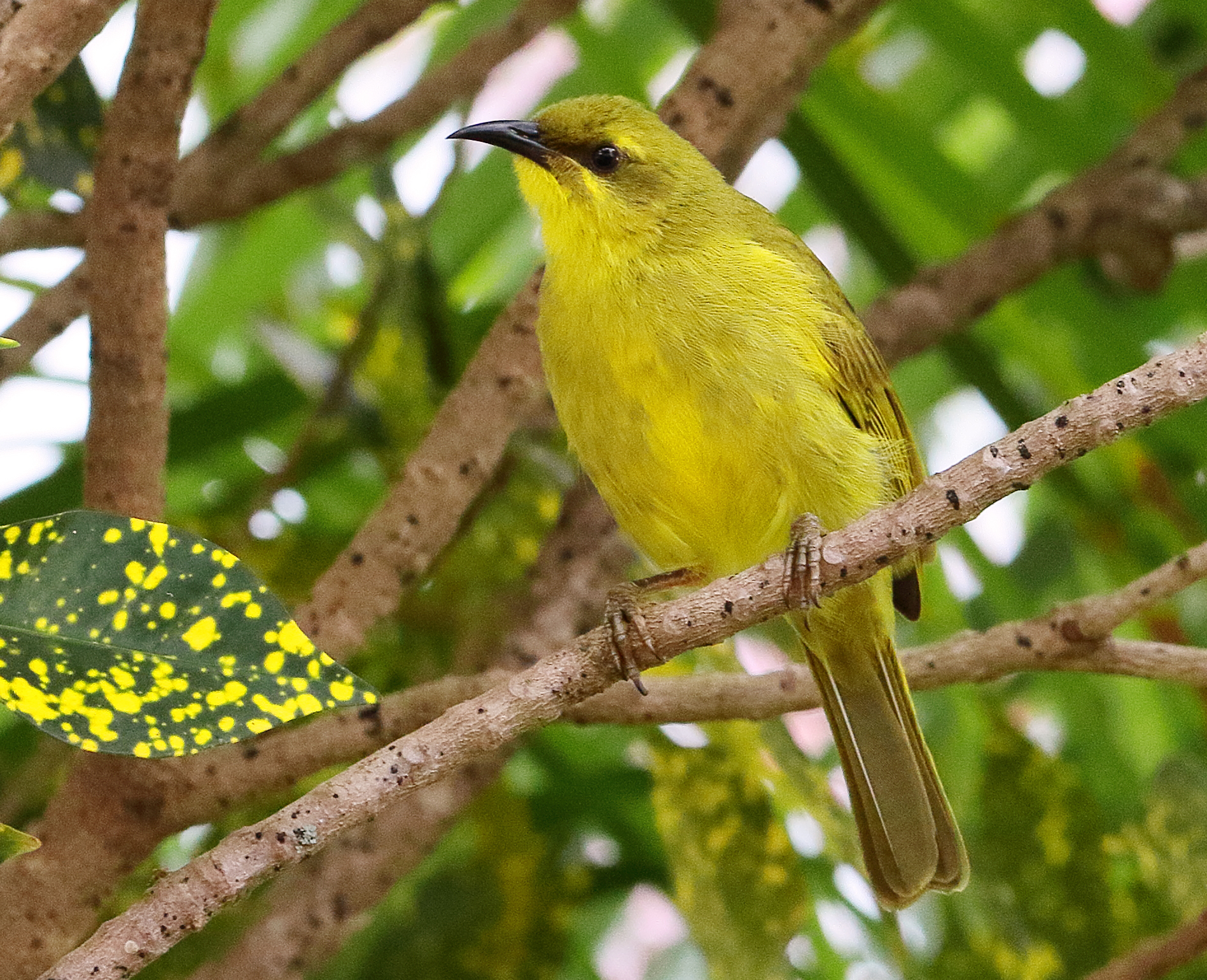
Stomiopera flava, Cairns

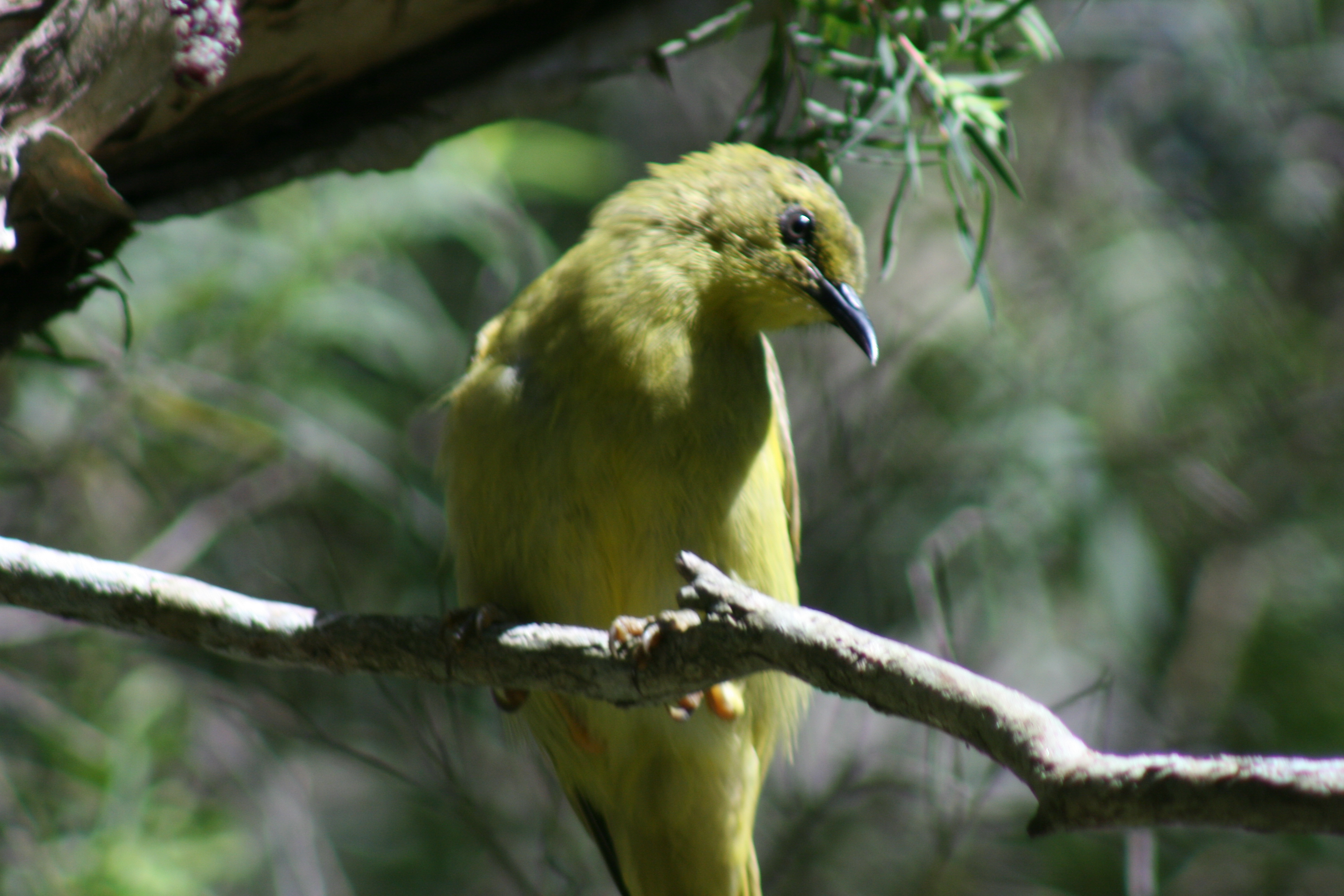

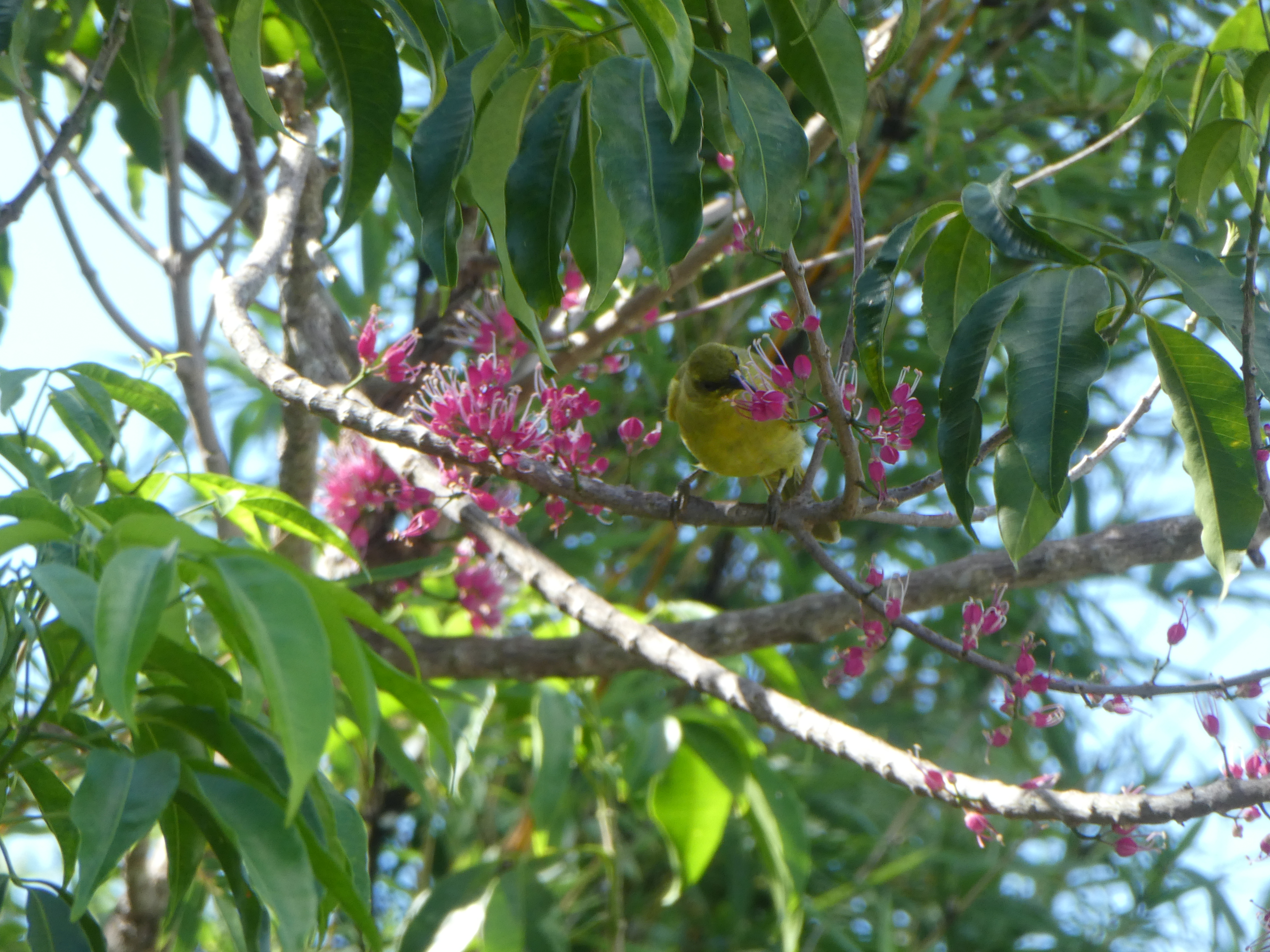
Feeding on flowers of the little Evodia (Melicope rubra).
