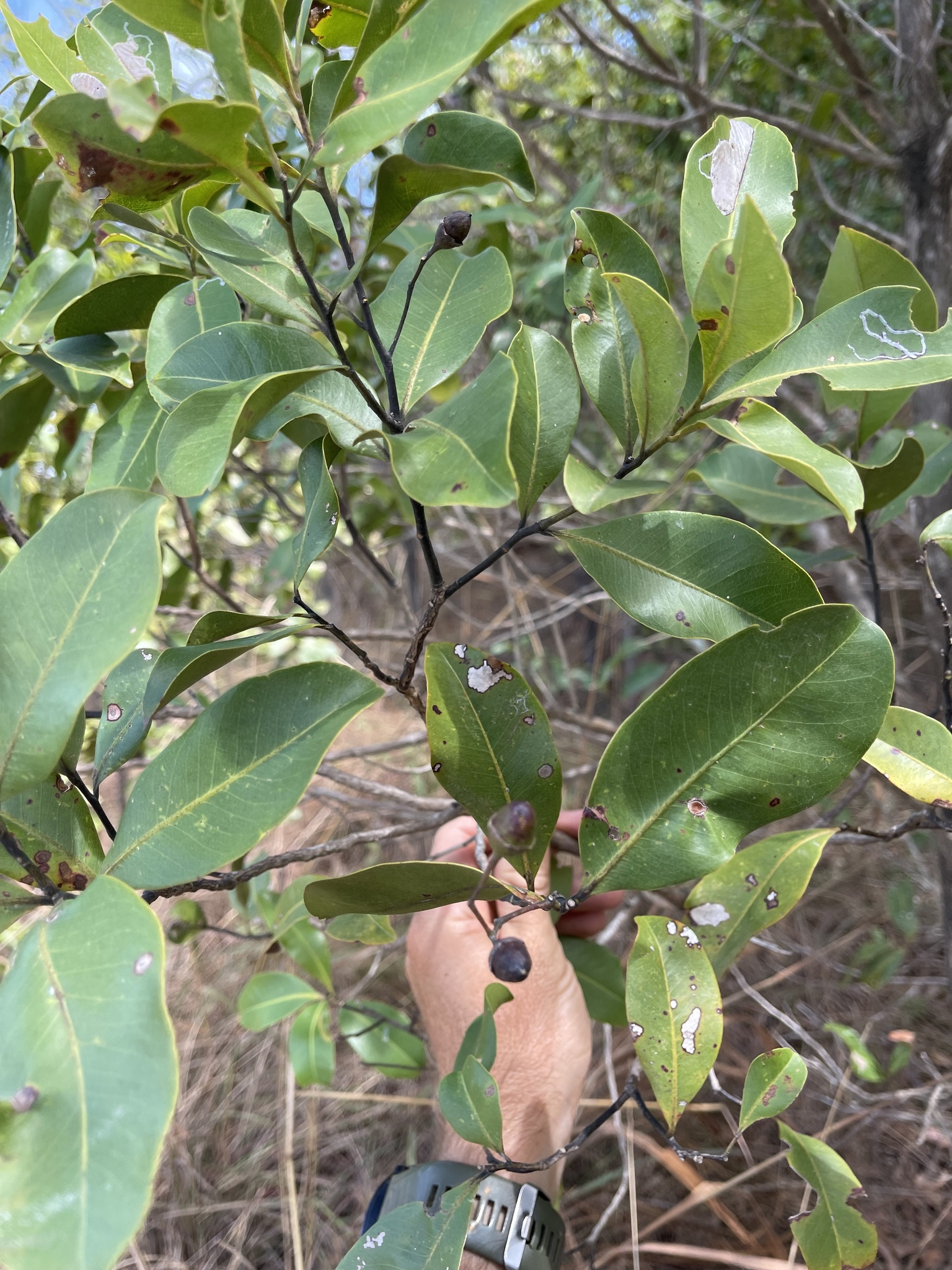
- Foliage and fruits

Conservation status
- Least Concern (IUCN 3.1)

Scientific classification
- Kingdom: Plantae
- Clade: Tracheophytes
- Clade: Angiosperms
- Clade: Eudicots
- Clade: Rosids
- Order: Myrtales
- Family: Myrtaceae
- Subfamily: Myrtoideae
- Tribe: Lophostemoneae
- Genus: Welchiodendron; Peter G.Wilson & J.T.Waterh.
- Species: W. longivalve

Binomial name
- Welchiodendron longivalve (F.Muell.) Peter G.Wilson & J.T.Waterh.

Synonyms
- Tristania longivalvis F.Muell.; Tristania brownii S.Moore

= Welchiodendron =

Genus of flowering plants

Welchiodendron is a genus of plant in the family Myrtaceae described as a genus in 1982. It contains only one described species, Welchiodendron longivalve, commonly known as buttercup tree or yellow box penda, native to New Guinea and northern Cape York Peninsula, Queensland, Australia.
