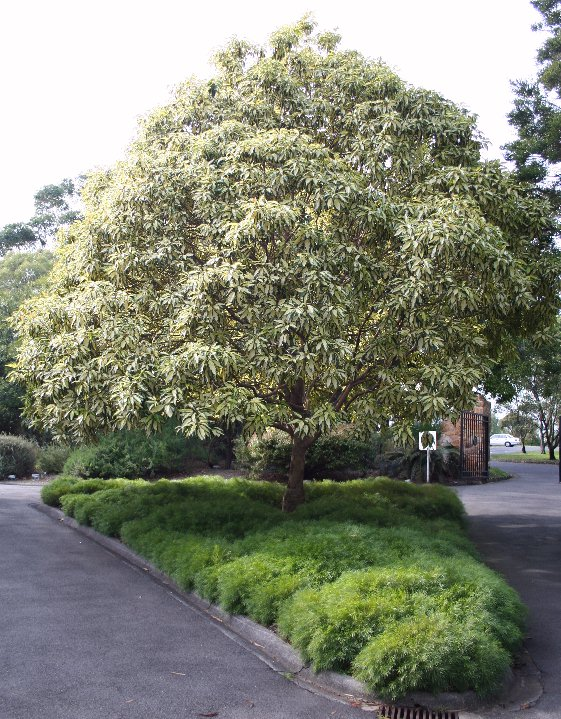
- Brush box (Lophostemon confertus), variegated form with Acacia cognata groundcover, Maranoa Gardens June 2006

Scientific classification
- Kingdom: Plantae
- Clade: Tracheophytes
- Clade: Angiosperms
- Clade: Eudicots
- Clade: Rosids
- Order: Myrtales
- Family: Myrtaceae
- Subfamily: Myrtoideae
- Tribe: Lophostemoneae

= Lophostemoneae =

Tribe of flowering plants

Lophostemoneae is a tribe in the plant family Myrtaceae from Sulawesi, Maluku, Borneo, New Guinea, and Australia.

== Genera ==
- Kjellbergiodendron
- Whiteodendron
- Lophostemon
- Welchiodendron
