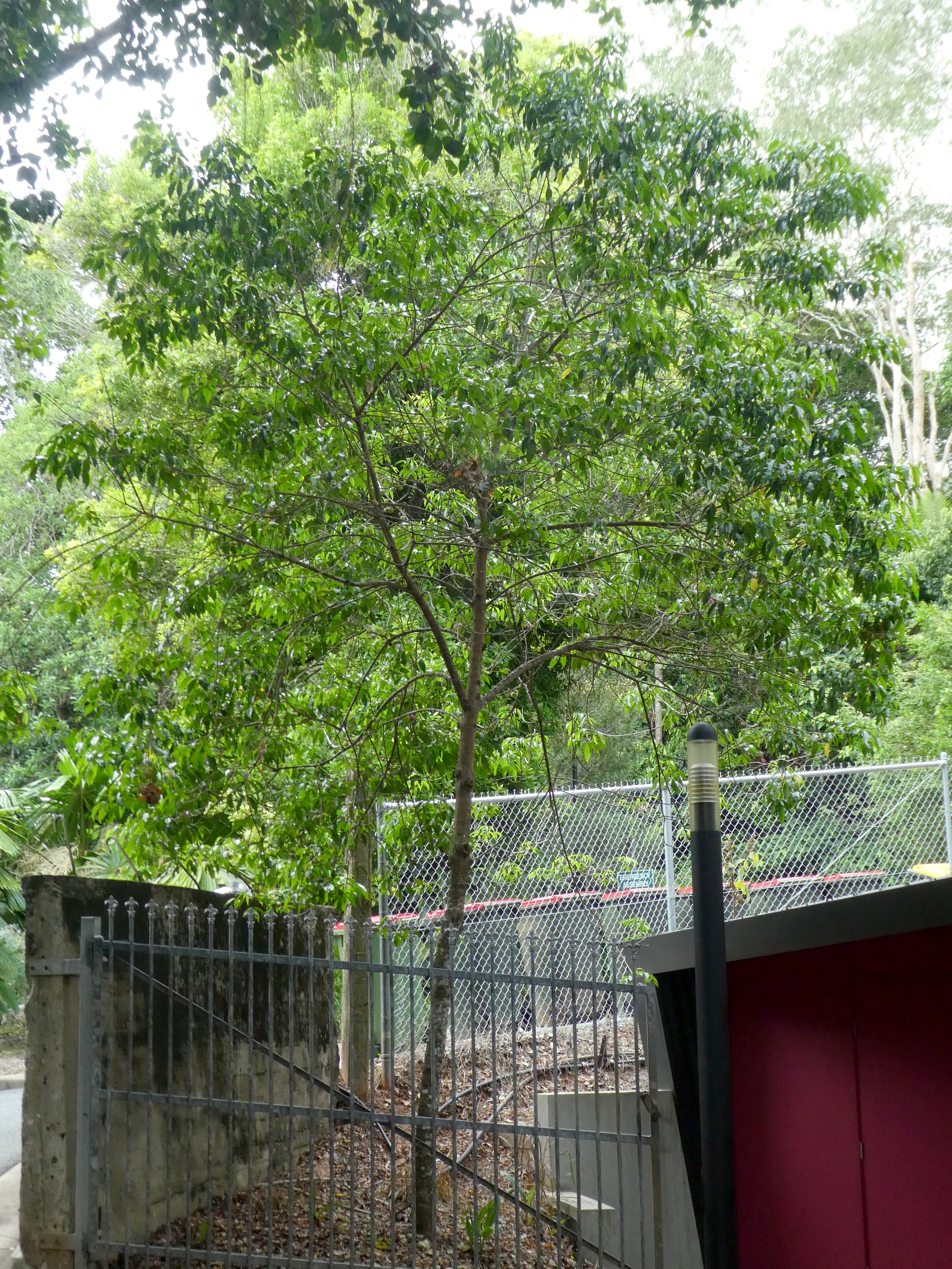
- Mature tree in Cairns

Conservation status
- Least Concern (NCA)

Scientific classification
- Kingdom: Plantae
- Clade: Tracheophytes
- Clade: Angiosperms
- Clade: Eudicots
- Clade: Rosids
- Order: Sapindales
- Family: Rutaceae
- Genus: Melicope
- Species: M. rubra

Binomial name
- Melicope rubra (Lauterb. & K.Schum.) T.G.Hartley

Synonyms
- Euodia rubra Lauterb. & K.Schum. (1900); Evodia rubra Lauterb. & K.Schum. orth. var.; Acronychia cauliflora Lauterb. (1918); Evodiella cauliflora (Lauterb.) B.L.Linden (1959)

= Melicope rubra =

Little evodia

Species of plant in the family Rutaceae

Melicope rubra, commonly known as the little evodia, is a species of small tree in the citrus family Rutaceae, native to New Guinea and northeast Queensland. It was originally described as Euodia rubra in 1900. It has trifoliate leaves and pink bisexual flowers arranged on branches below the leaves.

== Description ==
Melicope rubra is a tree that may grow to a height of 7 m (23 ft) with a trunk diameter of about 30 cm (12 in), but flowers and fruits as a shrub. The leaves are arranged in opposite pairs and are trifoliate on a petiole 20–75 mm (0.79–2.95 in) long. The leaflets are egg-shaped, 40–150 mm (1.6–5.9 in) long and 15–45 mm (0.59–1.77 in) wide, the leaflets sessile or on a petiolule up to 10 mm (0.39 in) long. The flowers are bisexual and arranged in panicles 25–65 mm (0.98–2.56 in) long on branches below the leaves. The sepals are more or less round to egg-shaped, 1.5–2.5 mm (0.059–0.098 in) long and joined at the base. The petals are pink, 5–6 mm (0.20–0.24 in) long and there are four stamens. Flowering occurs from February to June and the fruit consists of up to four follicles 20–30 mm (0.79–1.18 in) long and fused for at least half their length.

== Taxonomy ==
The little evodia was first formally described as Euodia rubra by the German botanists Carl Adolf Georg Lauterbach and Karl Moritz Schumann, based on plant material collected in New Guinea by Lauterbach in 1896. Their work was published in 1900 in Schumann's book, Die Flora der Deutschen Schutzgebiete in der Sudsee. In 2001 the American botanist Thomas Gordon Hartley published a 329-page revision of the closely related genera Euodia and Melicope, in which he transferred this species to Melicope.

=== Etymology ===
The genus name Melicope is from the Ancient Greek méli (honey), and cope (to chop, cut or divide), which refers to the notches in the nectar glands. The species epithet rubra is from the Latin ruber, red.

== Distribution and habitat ==
This species is native to northeastern Queensland (where it ranges from near Rossville southwards to the area around Cardwell) and New Guinea (where it is mostly found along the central chain of highlands). It grows in and adjacent to rainforest, and also in monsoon forest and wet sclerophyll forest. Its altitudinal range in Queensland is from sea level to about 850 m (2,790 ft), and 100 to 3,450 m (330 to 11,320 ft) in New Guinea.

== Conservation status ==
This species is classified as least concern under the Queensland Government's Nature Conservation Act 1992. As of 19 February 2024, it has not been assessed by the international Union for Conservation of Nature (IUCN).

== Ecology ==
Various species of honeyeaters and lorikeets visit the flowers for nectar, and the seeds are eaten by Macleay's honeyeaters (Xanthotis macleayanus). The tree also serves as one of the host plants for the Ulysses butterfly (Papilio ulysses) and the Emperor Gum Moth (Opodiphthera eucalypti).

== Cultivation ==
The little evodia has become a popular choice for both private gardens and public parks and streets, due to its small size, colourful flowers and the birds and butterflies which are attracted to it. Around 95 plants of this species have been planted by Cairns Regional Council around the city.

== Gallery ==
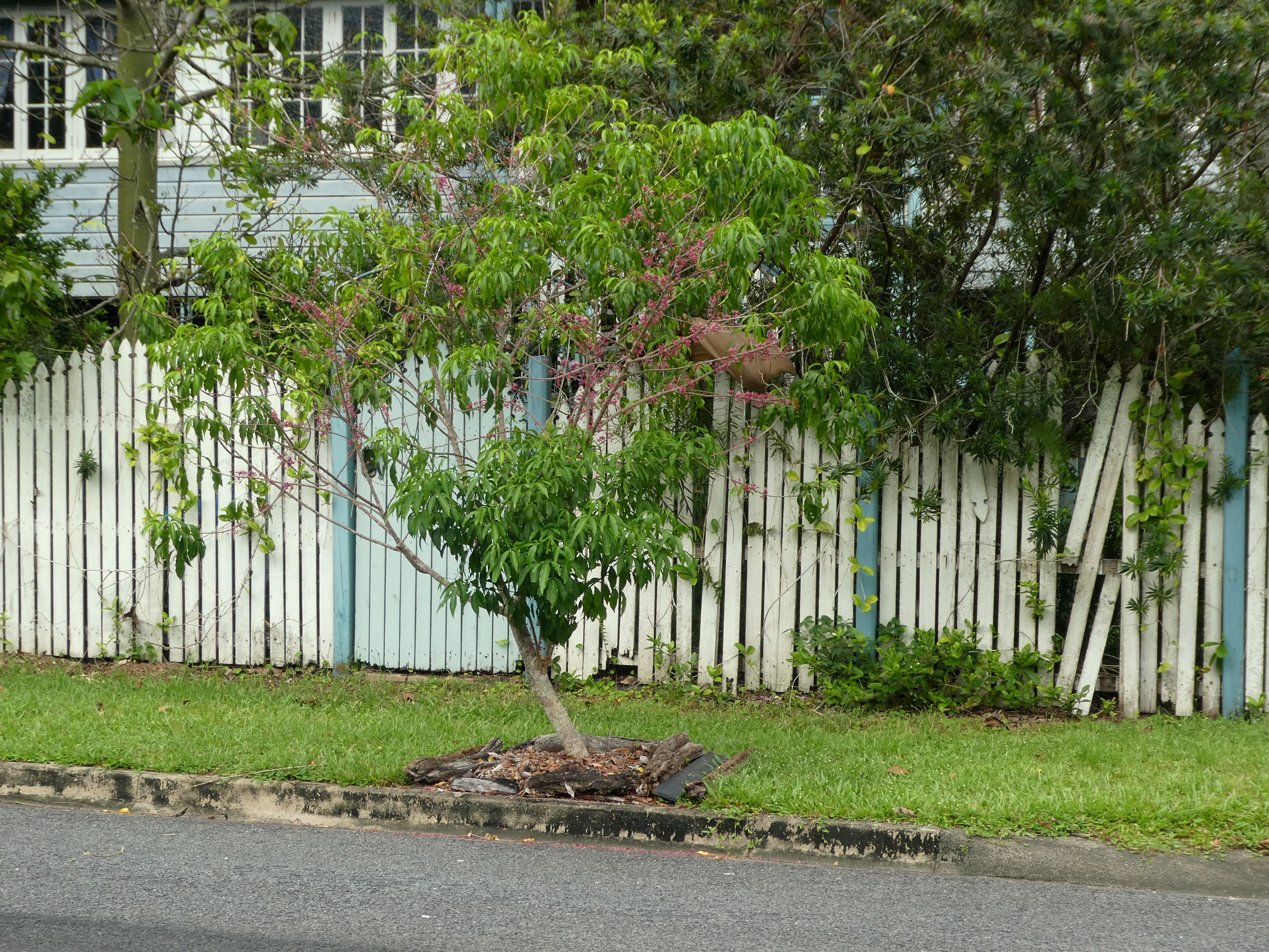
Young street tree in Cairns

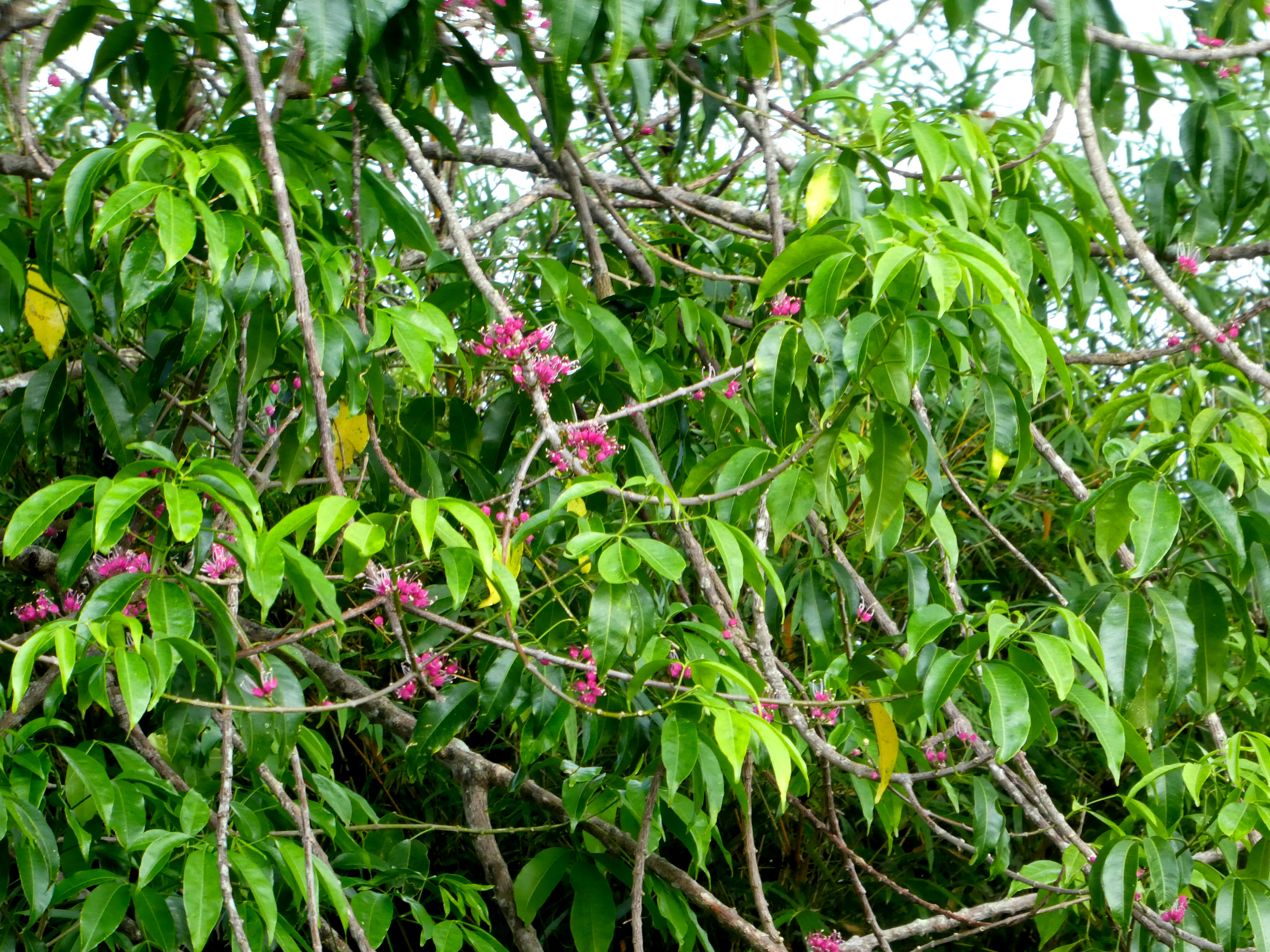
Foliage and flowers

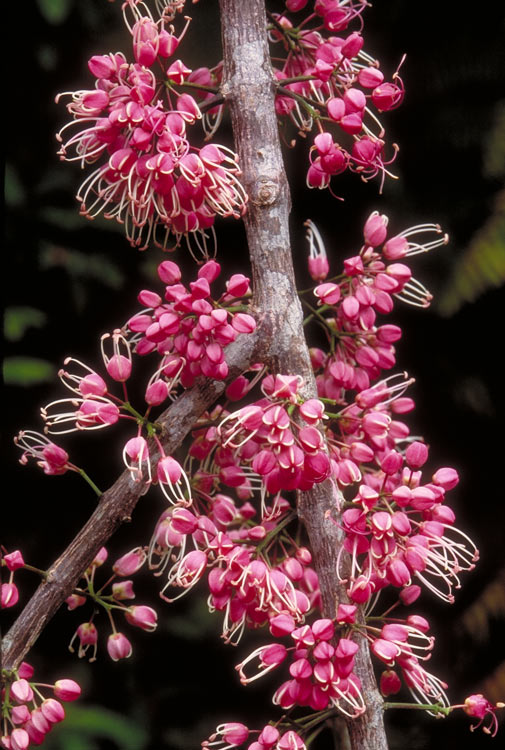
Flowers close-up

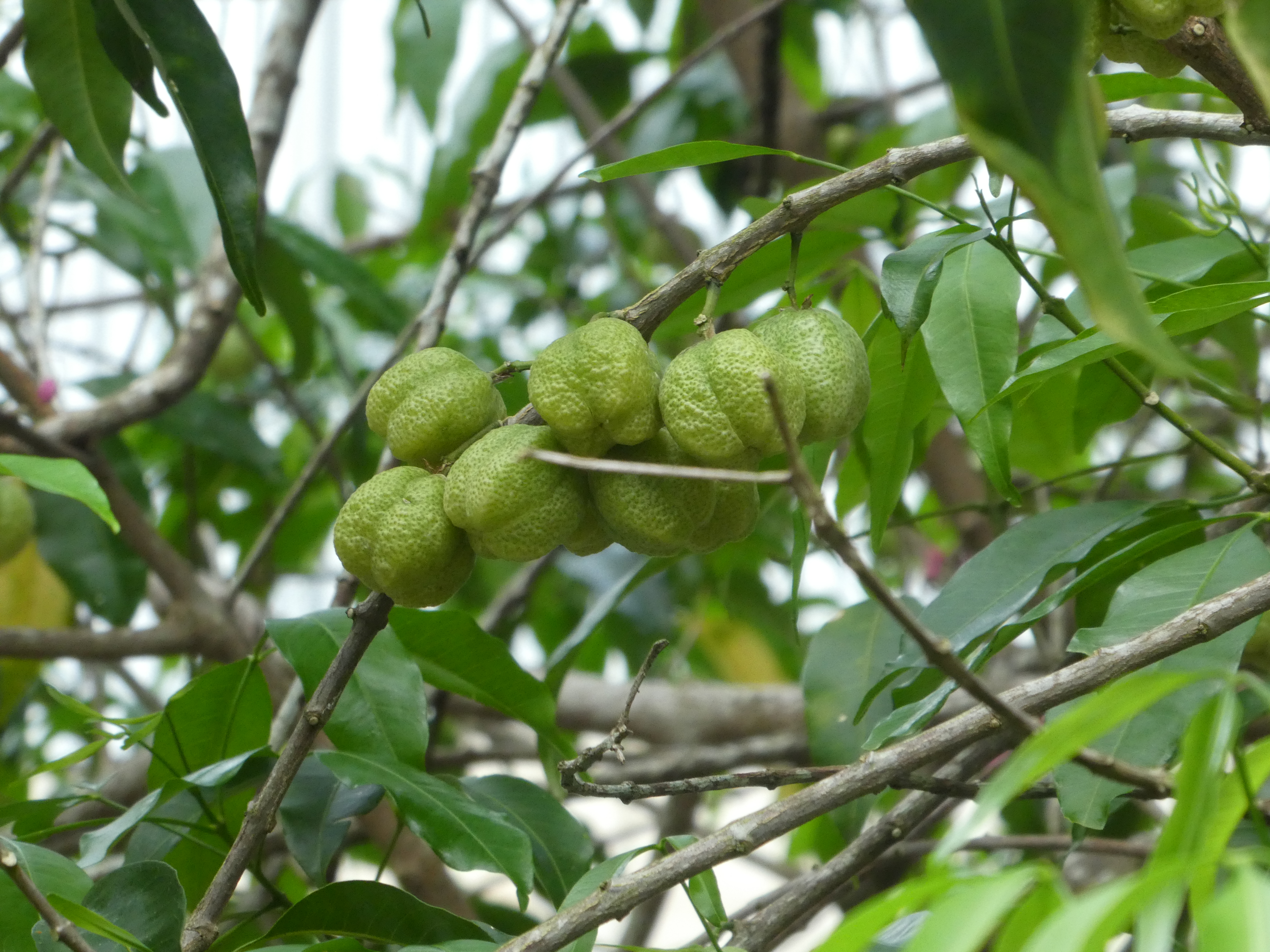
Ripe fruit

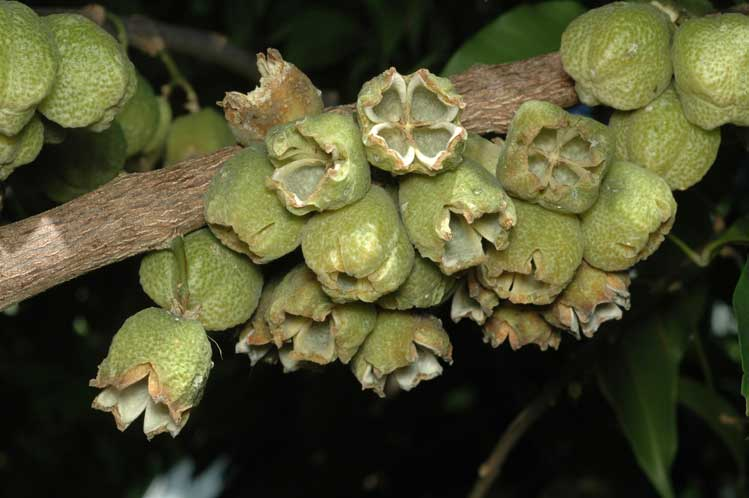
Dehisced fruit

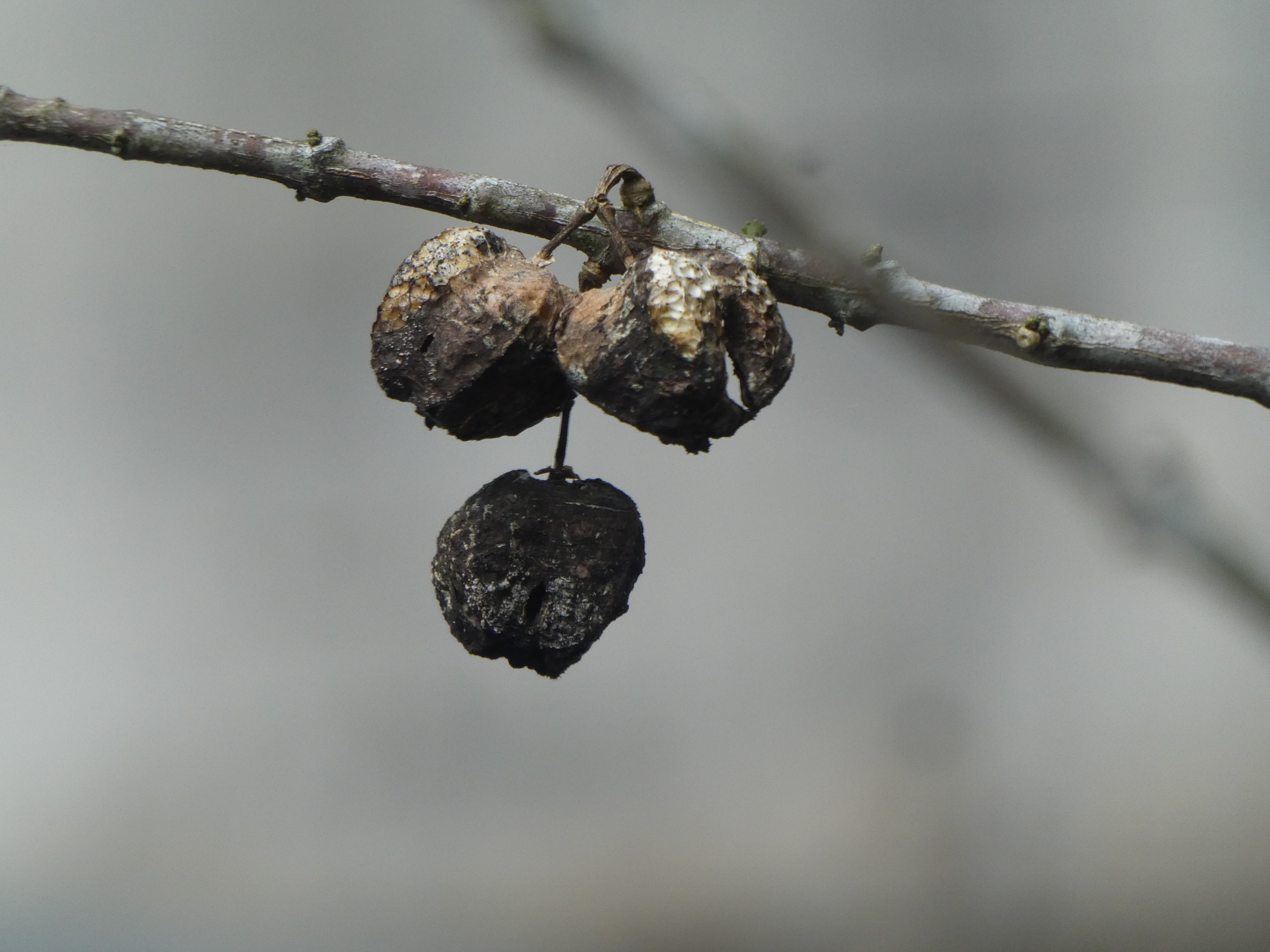
Old fruit

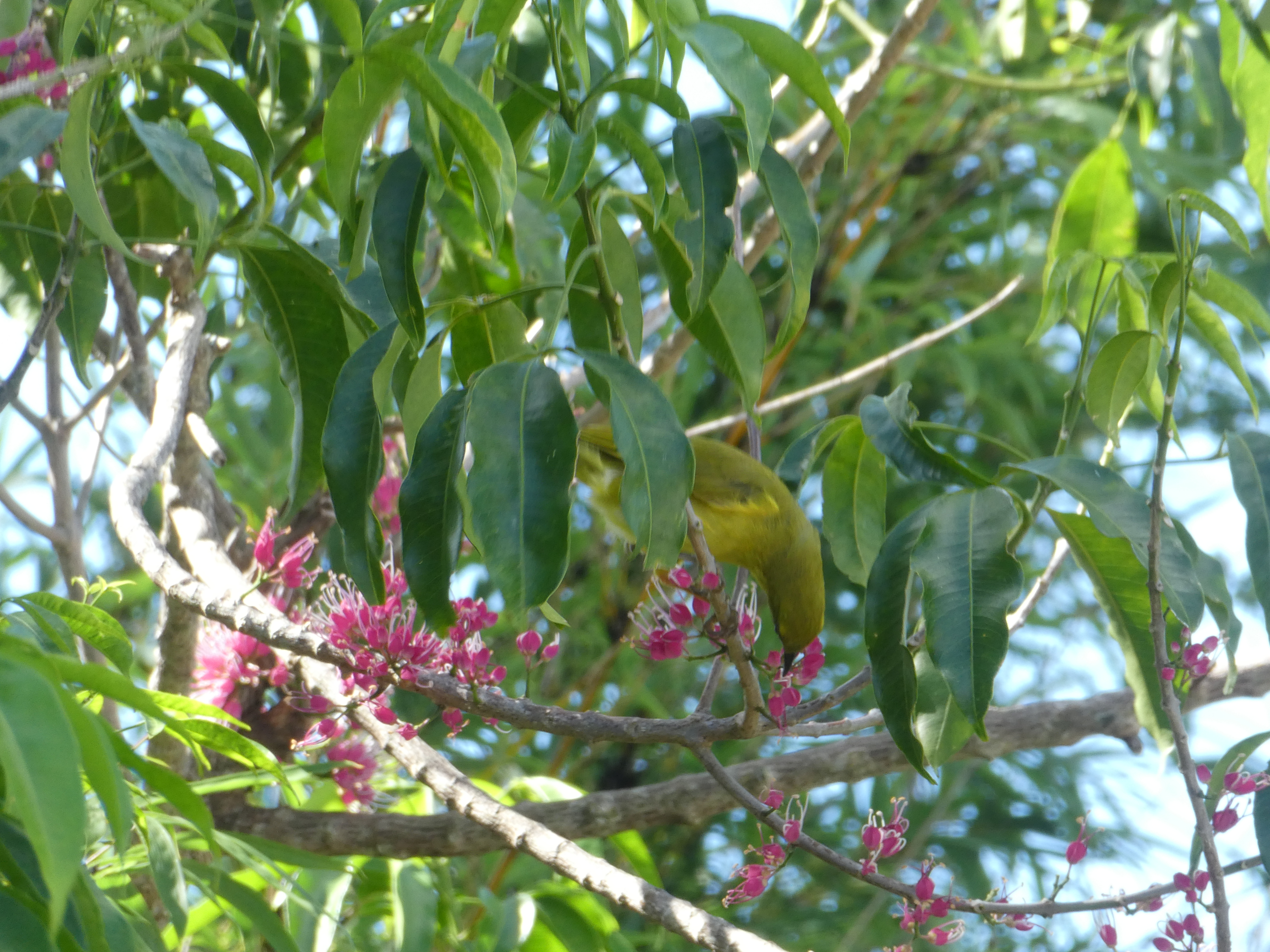
A yellow honeyeater (Stomiopera flava) gathering nectar in a little evodia
