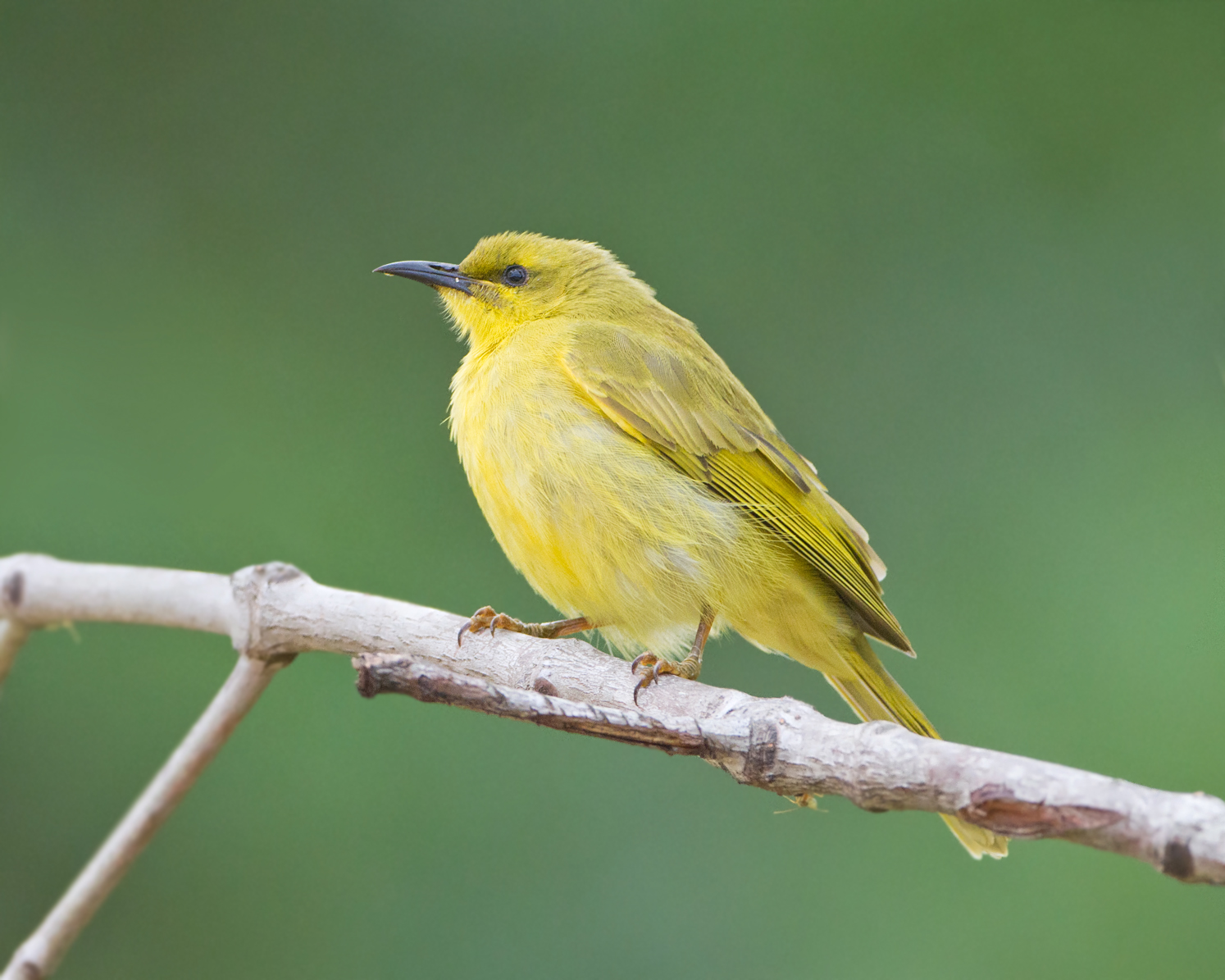
- Yellow honeyeater (Stomiopera flava)

Scientific classification
- Kingdom: Animalia
- Phylum: Chordata
- Class: Aves
- Order: Passeriformes
- Family: Meliphagidae
- Genus: Stomiopera; Reichenbach, 1852

Type species
- Ptilotis unicolor Gould, 1843

= Stomiopera =

Genus of birds

Stomiopera is a genus of honeyeaters endemic to Australia. It contains former members of Lichenostomus, and was created after a molecular phylogenetic analysis published in 2011 showed that the original genus was polyphyletic.

The genus contains two species:

Image	Scientific name	Common name	Distribution
	Stomiopera unicolor	White-gaped honeyeater	north Australia
	Stomiopera flava	Yellow honeyeater	northeast Australia

The name Stomiopera was first proposed by the German naturalist Ludwig Reichenbach in 1852. The word is derived from the Greek stomion meaning bridlebit or mouth and pēra meaning wallet or pouch.
