= Lophostemon grandiflorus =

Conservation status
- Data Deficient (IUCN 3.1)

Scientific classification
- Kingdom: Plantae
- Clade: Tracheophytes
- Clade: Angiosperms
- Clade: Eudicots
- Clade: Rosids
- Order: Myrtales
- Family: Myrtaceae
- Genus: Lophostemon
- Species: L. grandiflorus

Binomial name
- Lophostemon grandiflorus (Benth.) Peter G.Wilson & J.T.Waterh.

Subspecies
- Lophostemon grandiflorus subsp. grandiflorus; Lophostemon grandiflorus subsp. riparius (Domin) Peter G.Wilson & J.T.Waterh.

Synonyms
- Tristania grandiflora (Benth.) Cheel; Tristania suaveolens var. grandiflora Benth.

Species of tree

Lophostemon grandiflorus is a member of the family Myrtaceae endemic to Western Australia, the Northern Territory and Queensland.

The tree typically grows to a height of 3 to 18 metres (10 to 59 ft). It blooms between January and December producing cream-white flowers. The bark is persistent and pale brown in colour and almost fibrous. Epiphytic and parasitic plants are often found growing on the bark. The thick, ovate and dark green leaf blades are about 5 to 12 centimetres (2.0 to 4.7 in) in length and 2 to 6.5 cm (0.79 to 2.56 in) wide. The underblade of the leaf is much paler, almost white, in colour. It usually grows as a rheophyte along creeks through open forest, but is also found on the margins of rainforests.

It is found in damp areas such as riverbanks and sandstone gorges in the Kimberley region of Western Australia across the top end of the Northern Territory and then down the east coast as far as Central Queensland.

There are two known subspecies:

- Lophostemon grandiflorus subsp. grandiflorus
- Lophostemon grandiflorus subsp. riparius (Domin) Peter G.Wilson & J.T.Waterh.
