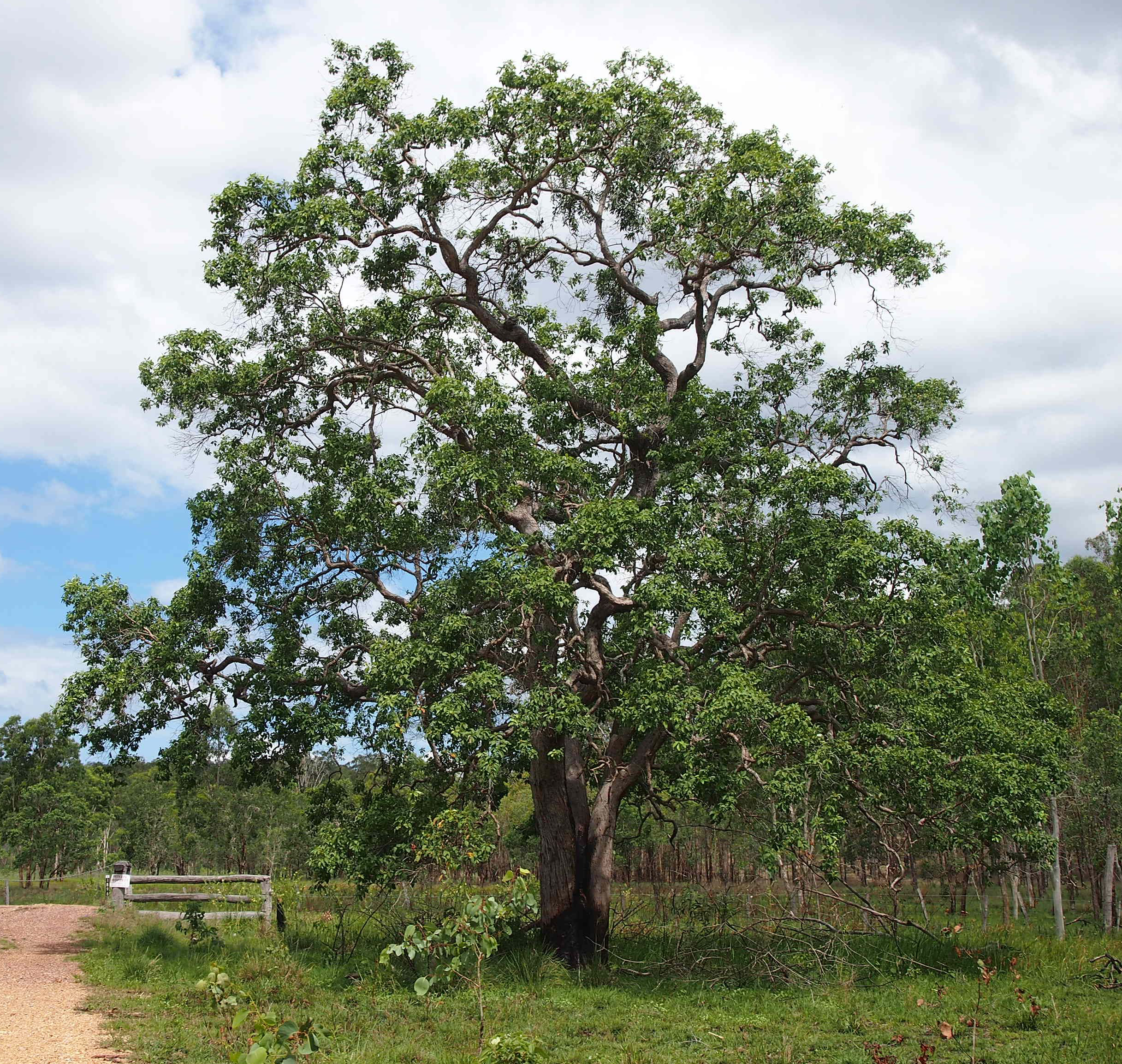

Conservation status
- Least Concern (IUCN 3.1)

Scientific classification
- Kingdom: Plantae
- Clade: Tracheophytes
- Clade: Angiosperms
- Clade: Eudicots
- Clade: Rosids
- Order: Myrtales
- Family: Myrtaceae
- Genus: Lophostemon
- Species: L. suaveolens

Binomial name
- Lophostemon suaveolens (Sol. ex Gaertn.) Peter G.Wilson & J.T.Waterh.

Synonyms
- 8 synonyms: Melaleuca suaveolens Sol. ex Gaertn.; Tristania suaveolens (Sol. ex Gaertn.) Sm.; Tristania suaveolens var. vulgaris Domin; Lophostemon depressus Schott; Tristania depressa Link; Tristania rhytiphloia F.Muell.; Tristania salicifolia Link ex Steud.; Tristania suaveolens var. glabrescens F.M.Bailey

= Lophostemon suaveolens =

Species of flowering plant

Lophostemon suaveolens, commonly known as swamp mahogany, swamp box or swamp turpentine, is a species of flowering plant in the clove and eucalyptus family Myrtaceae, native to New Guinea and Australia. In Australia, it occurs on the east coast, from north of the Hunter River in New South Wales, through to the top of Cape York Peninsula in Queensland. It grows in sclerophyll forest, swamp forest, gallery forest, and the margins of rainforests.
