= Donald Jupurrula Graham =

Australian Indigenous leader (c. 1920–1989)

Donald Jupurrula Graham (c. 1920 - 13 January 1989) was a Warumungu man from the Northern Territory of Australia. He worked as a stockman is his early life before becoming an Elder and community leader within his community and a teacher of and collaborator with researchers regarding the Warumungu language and culture. He was also the first person to be recorded speaking the Warlmanpa language.

== Life in the Northern Territory ==
The exact location of Graham's birth is not known but it is likely to have been in the vicinity of Powell Creek Telegraph Station and 'in the bush'. He was the son of Spencer Jakamarra (also recorded as 'Pencil'), who was from Newcastle Waters and Beanie Napurrla from Kanturrpa which is nearby to Tennant Creek. Much of Graham's early life was spent with his parents on cattle stations north of Tennant Creek and including at Helen Springs Station. He went through tribal initiation around 1936 at a place called Nyiwarlurlu, west of Banka Banka Station and he never received a 'European' education.

Despite his lack of formal education Graham did master the alphabet which was taught to him by fellow stockmen which was useful when identifying stock brands. This in part led to his long-held belief that people who could write simply wrote things down and forgot them, whereas he, would remember things forever.

As an adult Graham would become the head stockman at Helen Springs Station and, as a part of that role, he was provided with a hut where he lived with his wife Norah Napanangka. This hut looked over a sacred petroglyph site (which was made up of Aboriginal rock art) which he became the senior caretaker of. In the Warramunga language this is known as kurtingurlu. he later also worked at Banka Banka Station during the time it was managed by Mary Alice Ward.

In 1966 Graham was working as a tracker at the Tennant Creek Police Station and he began assisting people visiting there in language work. He first worked with linguist Prith Chakravarti in his study of the Warumungu people and, in December of that year, recorded two hours of language with Kenneth Hale where he was recording speaking Warlpiri and Warlmanpa as well as Warumungu; this was the first language recording of Warlmanpa made and it is now considered an 'extinct language'. Graham later realised that he had not told Hale that he could also speak Mudburra so that was not recorded. Hale recorded Graham's name as 'Donald Spencer'.

Graham was a polyglot and, in addition to the languages mentioned above, he also had a good understanding of Nyininy, Alyawarre, Tiwi and 'Afghan' (Arabic) which he had learned from the Afghan cameleers. He was also one of the few Warumungu men to have a deep knowledge of Warumungu Sign Language which is a form of language used more by the women of the community.

In addition to these skills Graham was also an expert in his culture and had deep knowledge of song and ceremony throughout the extended region. He also knew the landscape well and was a sort after expert in land claims, such as the Warumungu and McLaren Creek land claims, and site clearances between Tennant Creek and Elliott for projects like the railway corridor and the gas pipeline.

In 1973 Graham returned to Banka Banka Station where is 1975 he established the Kalumpurla outstation and cattle project, for which he established the Kalumbulba Aboriginal Association. In 1979 Graham also worked with linguist Jane Simpson and formed an ongoing working relationship with David Nash; these two researchers also often worked together. One of the projects the three worked together on Avoidance speech and the taboo against saying the name of a recently deceased community member.

In the late 1970s and 1980s Graham also served as a member of the Central Land Council and on the Northern Territory Aboriginal Education Advisory Committee.

He died on 13 January 1989 and was buried on country at Newcastle Waters at a Ngarrka (Man) Dreaming site.
