= William Linklater =

Australian bushman and writer (1868–1959)

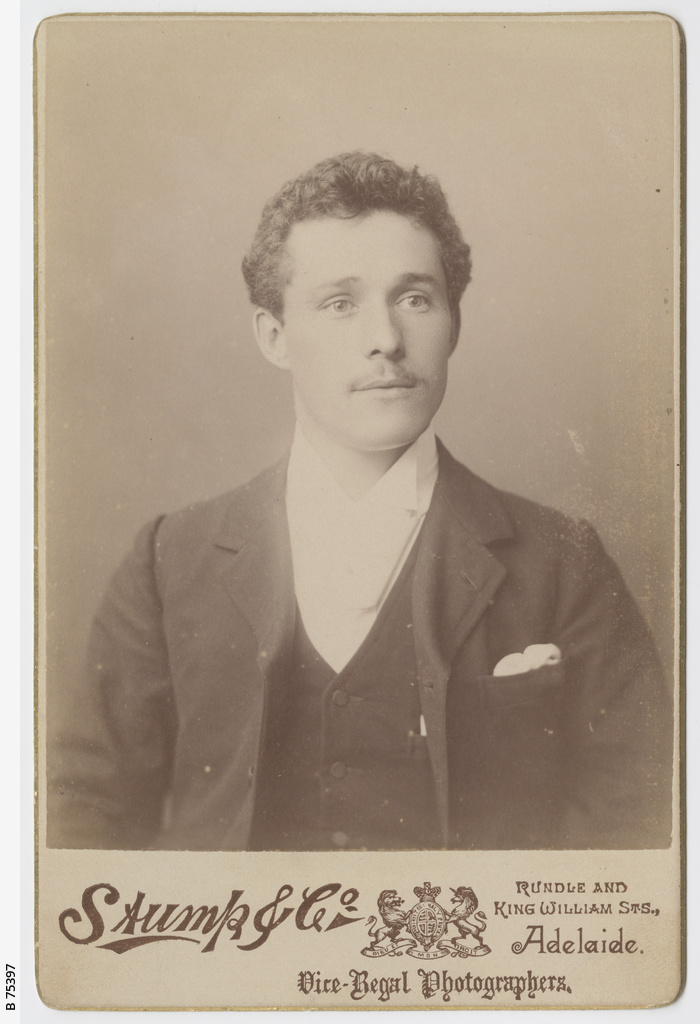
William Linklater, c 1890

William Linklater also known as Billy Miller (29 July 1868 – 3 November 1958) was a bushman, drover, prospector and writer who spent much of his life in the Northern Territory of Australia.

He is best known for his works The Magic Snake (1946) and Gather No Moss (1968).

== Early life ==
Linklater was born in Adelaide and was the son of William Robertson and Eleanor Wemys Linklater and his father worked as a baker. They were a Scottish Presbyterian family and, as a child, Linklater found Sundays "purgatory" and struggled with his strict upbringing and his father's desire for him to become a pastor. When Linklater was a young man, his father discovered that he was planning to run away from home, to go work on the sea, and beat him. Soon after, at the age of 13, Linklater did leave but instead headed to inland Australia and more remote places.

For the next few years, Linklater took any work that he could get and, by the age of 16, was working as a drover and had taken on the name of "Billy Miller" which was a version of the name "Billamilla" which had been given to him by, what he called, the Yanta Wonta tribe. This was their word for waterhole and he took the name, in part, to avoid being traced and brought back home to his family.

During the 1880s Linklater travelled extensively in Western Australia and Queensland and, by the turn of the century was working for Tom Nugent on the newly established Banka Banka Station in the Northern Territory. The pair were involved in cattle stealing here and drove them to Halls Creek where Linklater remained as a prospector.

== Life in the Northern Territory ==
When prospecting at Halls Creek failed Linklater returned to the Northern Territory around 1887 and cattle duffed along this way and stated that this "more than compensated for his failure to make a worthwhile gold strike". On his return he worked on a variety of stations part-time as the stockman while continuing to travel outside of the Territory to steal cattle and bring them back. It is said that, on one occasion, he arrived in Katherine with a large mob of horses that all had the brand of the South Australian Commissioner of Police.

One of the stations he worked on during this period was Elsey Station where he was the head stockma befriended Jeannie Gunn who based a character in her books We of the Never Never and The Little Black Princess on him. Linklater also befriended other authors Bill Harney and Ernestine Hill; in 1939 Hill wrote an article about him "Conquistador - Portrait of a Bushman" which was published in Cornhill Magazine.

Between 1900 and 1910 Linklater fathered at least two children with "Hollowjacks Alice", a Jingili woman with these being William (George) and Alice Mary Miller who was also known as "Lulla".

By 1910 Linklater was working as a drover on the Murranji Track between Newcastle Waters Station and Wave Hill Station. He also worked as a buffalo and crocodile shooter further north but struggled with exporting the hides and found it 'hard and dirty work'. He also made a brief attempt at pearling and the mining at Wandi (near Pine Creek).

During his life in the Northern Territory he developed strong relationships with many Aboriginal people and people groups and learned to speak a number of Aboriginal languages. Around the campfire, he would often read to people from Shakespeare, Plato, Karl Marx and whatever else he could come across. He would defend the rights of Aboriginal people fiercely and recorded much of the knowledge that he did come to hold.

In 1933 he made a permanent camp at Katherine and begun writing to The Northern Standard newspaper as "Orangballander".

He was forced to leave in 1938 when failing eyesight necessitated a move to Sydney.

== Later life ==
In Sydney, Linklater spent the remainder of his life living in a boarding house and living on an old aged pension. He began writing for publication and, in 1946, published The Magic Snake, that shared Aboriginal legends and, soon after, became a member of the Fellowship of Australian Writers.

He died in obscurity on 3 November 1958 and is buried at Botany Cemetery where his grave bears the epitaph "A Conquistador of the North".

Before his death, Linklater deposited his papers at the Mitchell Library and, using these, in 1968 his memoir Gather No Moss was published following work done on them by Lynda Tapp. Ernestine Hill's article about Linklater would serve as the forward of this book and she found him to be "a rare classic scholar, as many of the older bushmen are".
