= Station (Australian agriculture) =

Large landholding used for livestock production

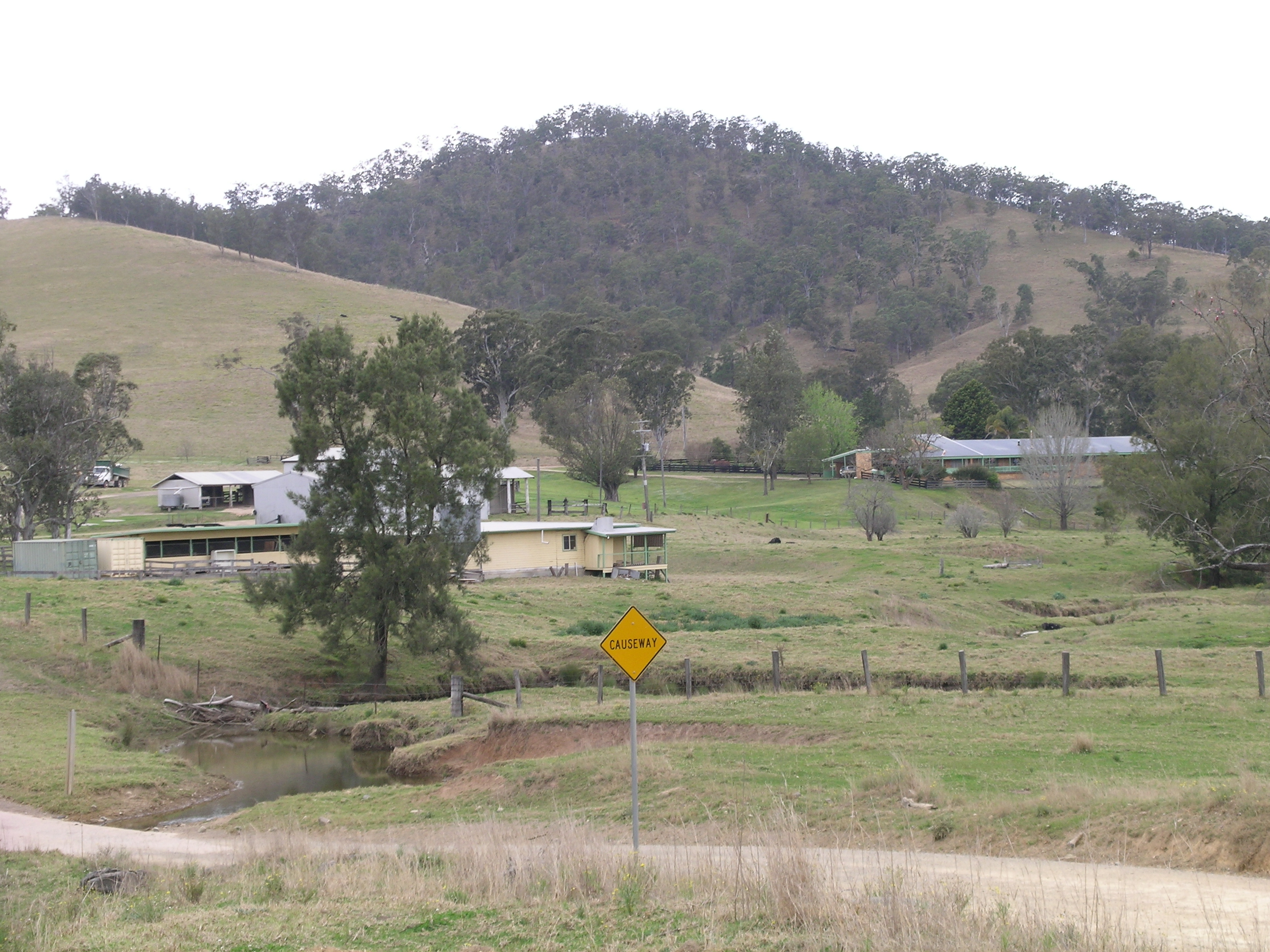
A cattle station in northern New South Wales

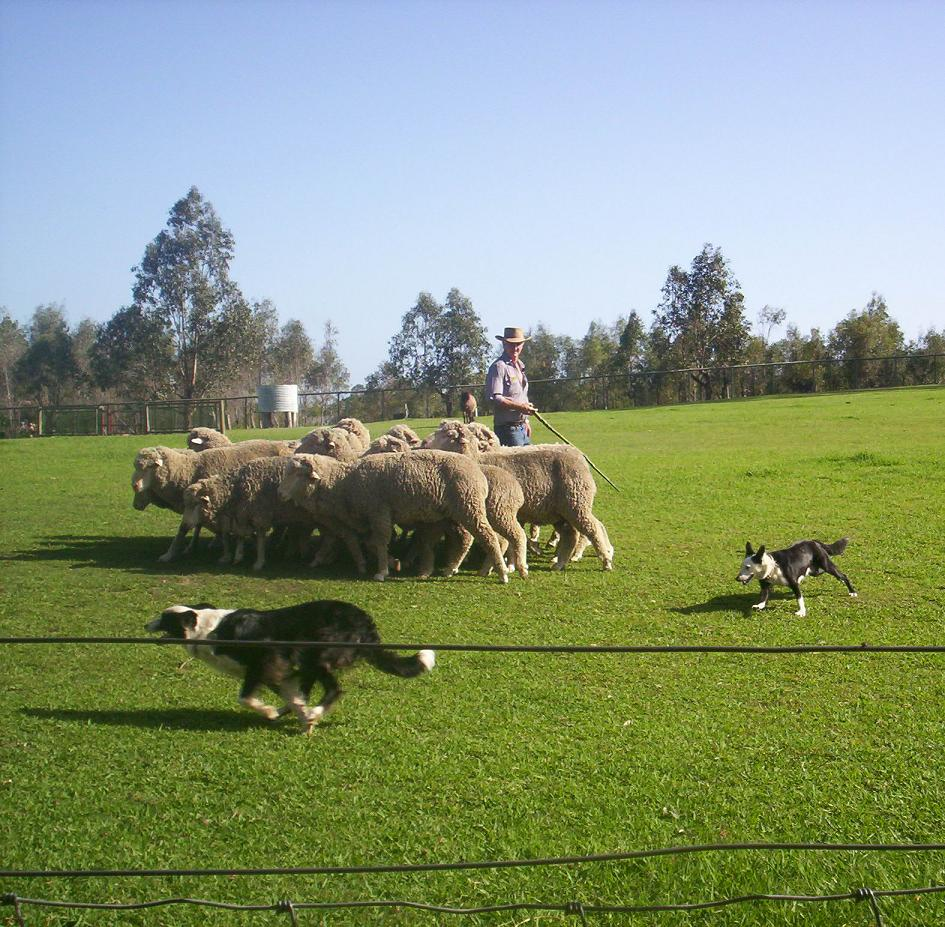
Border Collie, left, and a border collie cross working sheep in Queensland

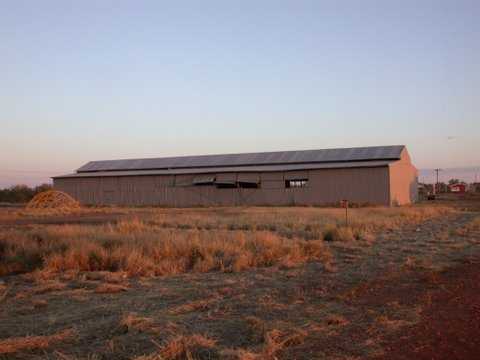
Noonkanbah woolshed, now a local community centre in Western Australia

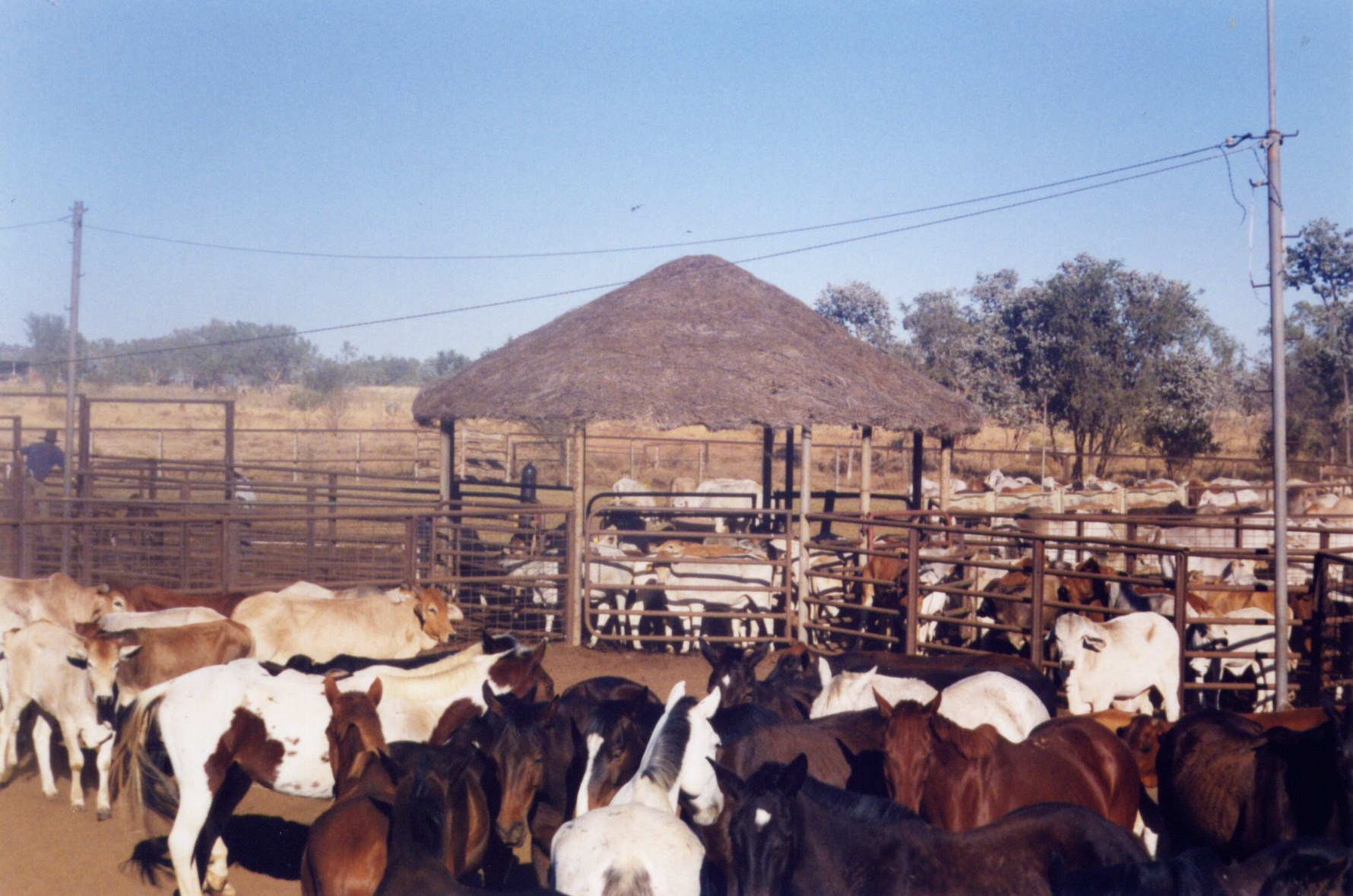
Cattle and horses in stockyards at Victoria River Downs Station circa 1985

In Australia, New Caledonia and New Zealand, a station is a large landholding used for producing livestock, predominantly cattle or sheep, that needs an extensive range of grazing land. The owner of a station is called a pastoralist or a grazier, corresponding to the North American term "rancher".

Originally station referred to the homestead – the owner's house and associated outbuildings of a pastoral property, but it now generally refers to the whole holding. Stations in Australia are on Crown land pastoral leases, and may also be known more specifically as sheep stations or cattle stations, as most are stock-specific, dependent upon the region and rainfall.

If they are very large, they may also have a subsidiary homestead, known as an outstation.

== Sizes ==
Aerial views of Oulnina Park Station at Manna Hill, South Australia.

Sheep and cattle stations can be thousands of square kilometres in area, with the nearest neighbour being hundreds of kilometres away. Anna Creek Station in South Australia is the world's largest working cattle station. It is roughly 24,000 square kilometres (9,300 mi^{2}); much larger than the runner-up, Clifton Hills, another South Australian cattle station spanning 17,000 square kilometres (6,600 mi^{2}); and substantially larger than America's biggest ranch (King Ranch), which is only 3,339 square kilometres (1,289 mi^{2}). King Ranch is approximately 13% of the size of Anna Creek Station.

== Structure ==
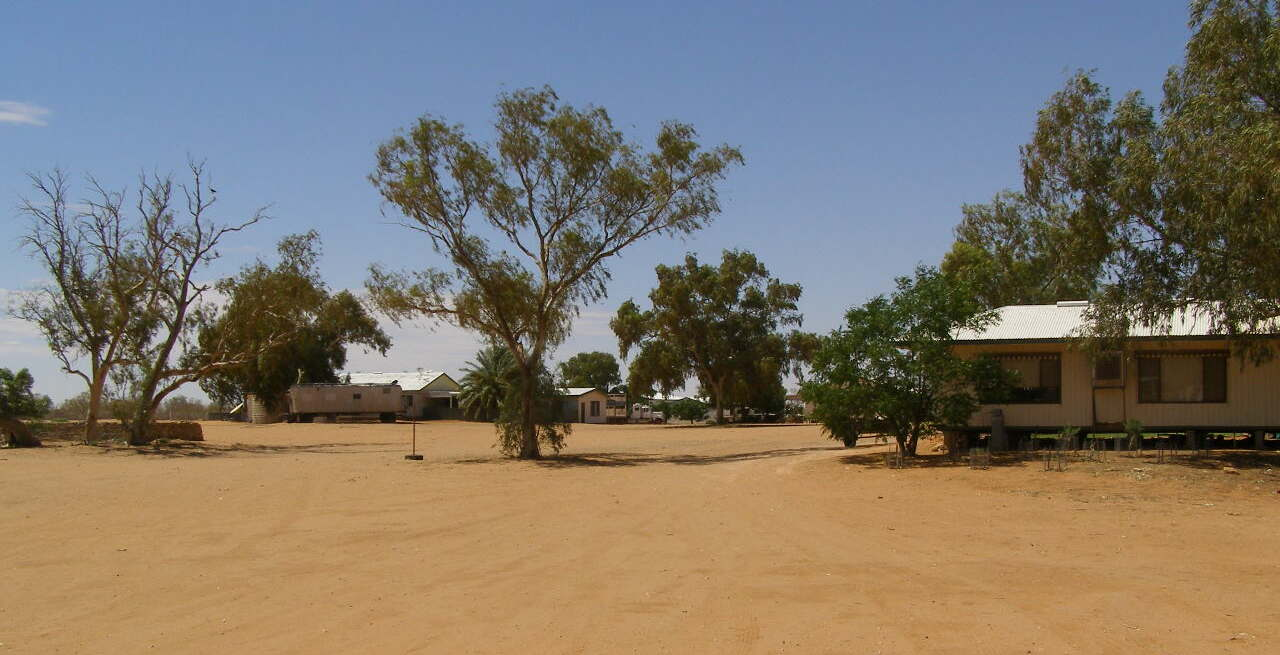
Anna Creek main homestead

A station typically has a homestead where the property owner or the manager lives. Nearby cottages or staff quarters provide housing for the employees. Storage sheds and cattle yards are also sited near the homestead. Other structures depend on the size and location of the station. Isolated stations will have a mechanic's workshop, schoolroom, a small general store to supply essentials, and possibly an entertainment or bar area for the owners and staff. Water may be supplied from a river, bores or dams, in conjunction with rainwater tanks. Nowadays, if rural mains power is not connected, electricity is typically provided by a generator, although solar electricity systems have become increasingly common.

=== Outstations ===
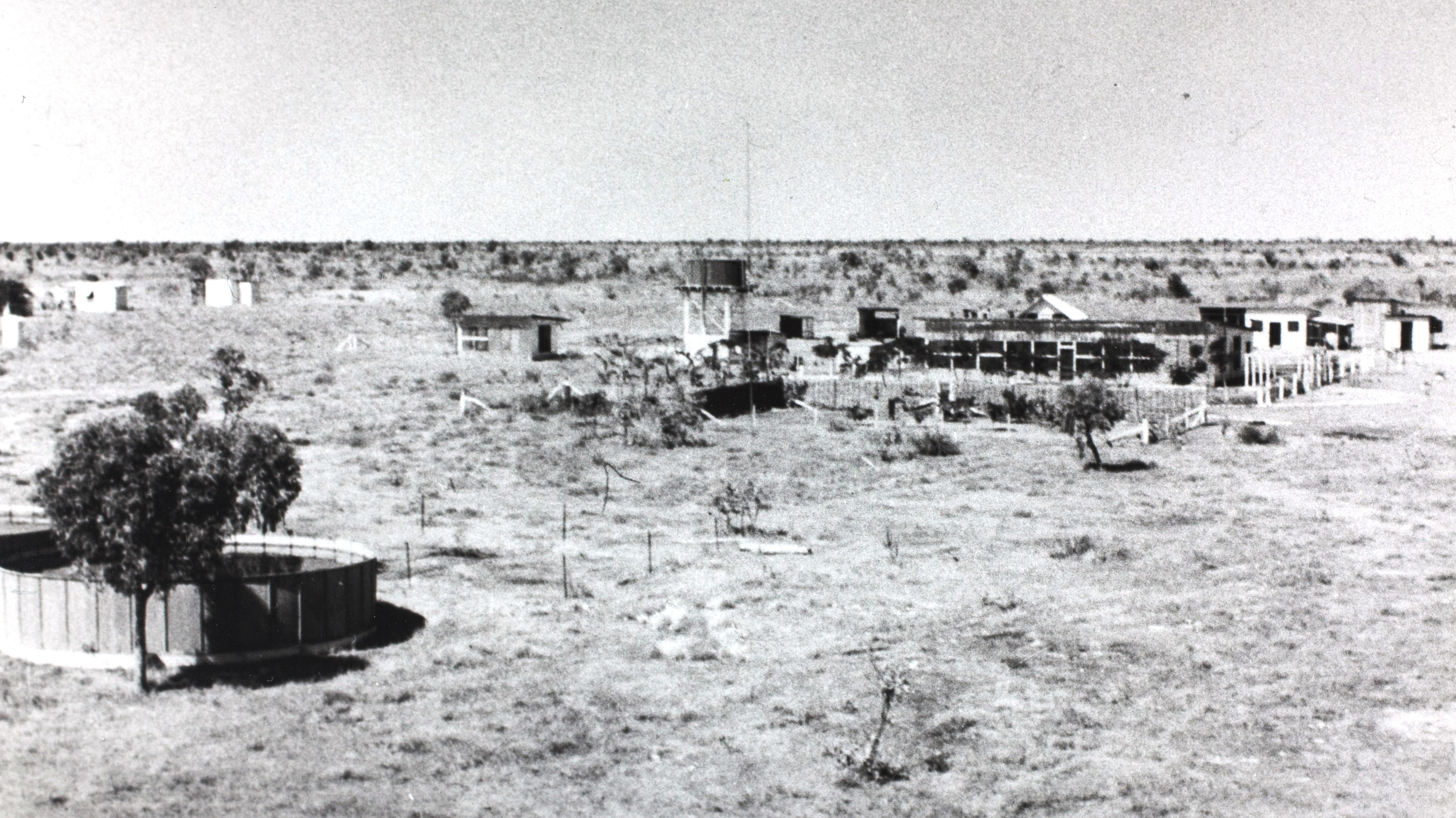
Cattle Creek outstation of Wave Hill, NT, 1962

Historically, an outstation was a subsidiary homestead or other dwelling on Australian sheep or cattle stations that was more than a day’s return travel from the main homestead. Although the term later came to be more commonly used to describe a specific type of Aboriginal settlement, also known as a homeland community, it is still used on cattle and sheep stations today, for example the Sturt Creek Outstation of the Ruby Plains Station in the Kimberley, and Rawlinna sheep station, Australia’s largest operating sheep station.

=== Facilities ===
Because of the extended distances, there is a School of the Air so that children can attend classes from their homes, originally using pedal-powered radios to communicate with the teachers, developed by South Australian engineer and inventor Alfred Traeger in 1929. The larger stations have their own school and teacher to educate the children on the station until at least they commence high school. Large isolated stations have their own stores to supply workers with their needs.

Medical assistance is given by the Royal Flying Doctor Service (also originally using Traeger's pedal radio technology), where medical staff such as doctors and nurses can treat patients at their homes, or airlift emergency and seriously ill patients to hospitals at the nearest towns. The Westpac Life Saver Rescue Helicopter Service and RAC rescue helicopter and its trained medical crews also respond quickly to emergencies threatening the life, health and safety of people caused through medical emergency, illness, natural disaster, accidents or mishap.

== Personnel ==
A station hand is an employee, who is involved in routine duties on a station and this may also involve caring for livestock.

Some stations are in remote areas that are not easy to access, limiting their population greatly. Accommodation for couples and families may be limited. An important example is the jackaroo (male) or jillaroo (female), a young person who works on a station for several years in a form of apprenticeship, in order to become an overseer or rural property manager. Aboriginal people have played a big part in the northern cattle industry where they were and still are competent stockmen on the cattle stations. Nowadays staff on these stations may work in the homestead and in stock camps. Stockmen, especially ringers, may be seasonal employees. Others include boremen, managers, mechanics, machinery operators (including grader drivers), station and camp cooks, teachers, overseers and bookkeepers. Veterinary surgeons also fly to some of the more distant cattle and sheep stations.

== Popular culture ==
Jeannie Gunn arrived at Elsey Station in 1902, leaving after her husband died, and in 1908 wrote the book We of the Never Never based on her time on the property. Elsey also featured in the 1946 film The Overlanders. The crew set up camp on the property for a month, and the river crossing sequence was shot at the Roper River.

Writer Arthur Upfield spent many years working in the outback and on stations in many different jobs; he later described station life of the early 20th century in his novels.

The long-running television drama McLeod's Daughters (2001–2009) is set on an Australian cattle station. The 2008 film Australia was set on the fictional station Faraway Downs; the movie was filmed on Home Valley Station.

The 2016 videogame Sid Meier's Civilization VI introduces Australia into the series, with one ability being a unique tile improvement called the Outback Station.

== See also ==
- List of ranches and stations § Australia
- List of the largest stations in Australia
- Outstation
- Pastoral lease
- Rangeland#Australia
- Station (New Zealand agriculture)
