= Muckaty Station =

Aboriginal freehold landholding in the Northern Territory of Australia

Coordinates: 18°37′40″S 133°52′17″E

Location in Northern Territory

Muckaty Station, also known as Warlmanpa, is a 2,380-square-kilometre (920 sq mi) Aboriginal freehold landholding in Australia's Northern Territory, 110 kilometres (68 mi) north of Tennant Creek, and approximately 800 kilometres (500 mi) south of Darwin. Originally under traditional Indigenous Australian ownership, the area became a pastoral lease in the late 19th century and for many years operated as a cattle station. It is traversed by the Stuart Highway, built in the 1940s along the route of the service track for the Australian Overland Telegraph Line. It is also crossed by the Amadeus Gas Pipeline built in the mid-1980s, and the Adelaide–Darwin railway, completed in early 2004. Muckaty Station was returned to its Indigenous custodians in 1999.

The area comprises semi-arid stony ridges, claypans and a stony plateau, and experiences a sub-tropical climate, with a wet season between January and March. The vegetation is mostly scrubland, including spinifex grasslands. The fauna is generally typical of Australian desert environments, and includes the red kangaroo, the eastern wallaroo, the northern nail-tail wallaby, and the spinifex hopping mouse.

A site within Muckaty was being considered for Australia's low-level and intermediate-level radioactive waste storage and disposal facility. Indigenous custodians of Muckaty Station were divided over the proposal, which also met resistance from environmental organisations and the Northern Territory government. The plan was abandoned after a Federal Court of Australia case in 2014.

== History ==
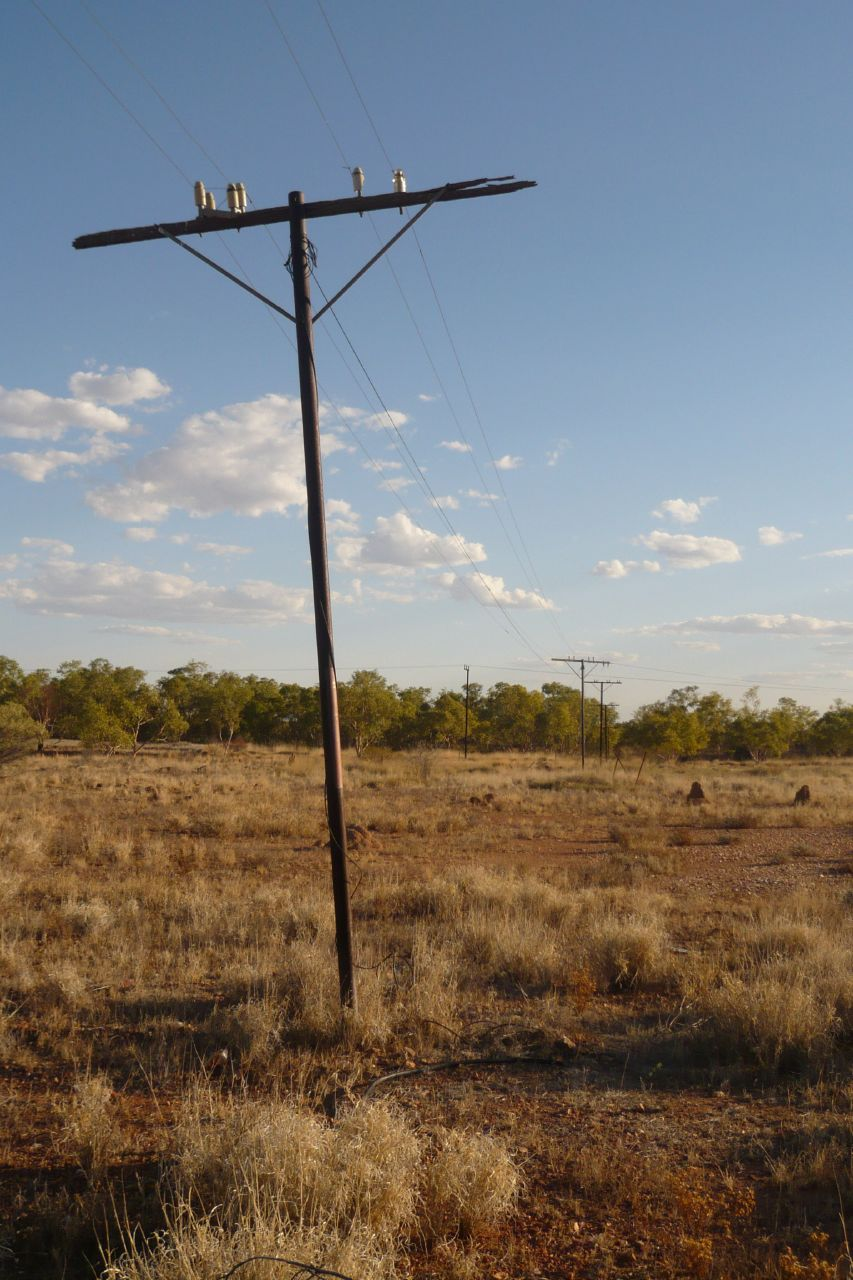
Australian Overland Telegraph Line poles near Muckaty Station

Indigenous Australians have lived in parts of the Northern Territory for around 40,000 years. Pre-European settlement numbers are not known with any precision, although the Indigenous population of the Northern Territory has been estimated at "well over 10,000". The area now known as Muckaty Station (often referred to as just "Muckaty", though the origin of this name and near variants such as "Mucketty" is unknown) was – and is – the responsibility of seven clans of traditional Indigenous owners: Milwayi, Ngapa, Ngarrka, Wirntiku, Kurrakurraja, Walanypirri and Yapayapa. The country is known by the Indigenous name Warlmanpa, which is also the name of a local language.

Although there had been several unsuccessful attempts by British or colonial authorities to settle in the Northern Territory, there was no permanent European presence until surveyor George Goyder in 1869 established what is now known as Darwin. The timing was auspicious: in October 1870 the South Australian government decided to construct an overland telegraph line, from Port Augusta on the continent's south coast, to the new settlement just established in the country's tropical north. The line traversed what is now Muckaty Station, with repeater stations built at Powell Creek to the north and Tennant Creek to the south. At the same time as the telegraph line was completed in August 1872, a cattle industry was beginning to develop in central and northern Australia. The first pastoral lease in the Northern Territory was granted in 1872, and by 1911 there were at least 250 such leases covering over 180,000 square miles (470,000 km^{2}) of the jurisdiction. The Muckaty pastoral lease was created in the late 19th century. Currently the property is surrounded by other leases including Powell Creek to the north, Helen Springs Station to the east with Philip Creek and Banka Banka Stations to the south. In the 1930s, the Australian government was sufficiently concerned about the condition and lack of development of these leases that it held two inquiries between 1932 and 1938. Historian Ted Ling's accounts of those inquiries, however, make no mention of Muckaty, which was not singled out for comment by either investigation.

Throughout the history of Australia's pastoral industry, Indigenous Australians were a major part of the workforce. In 1928 for example, 80 per cent of Indigenous people with jobs were employed on the stations, including Muckaty, with many living on and travelling across the pastoral leases. The local language, Warlmanpa, was recognised in some publications from the 1930s onward, while anthropologists and administrators made some records of language and population in the region of Muckaty Station. Only one record from the period lists both Muckaty Station as a location and Warlmanpa as a language. A record of Aboriginal wards of the state, it showed only three Indigenous adults living on Muckaty, compared to almost fifty on Banka Banka Station, to the east. This reflects the fact that, by 1940, "Warlmanpa country had been depopulated".

By the 1940s the lessee at Muckaty was Fred Ulyatt. The 1940s also marked a significant change in the region's road infrastructure. A dirt track had been formed to service the telegraph line in the late nineteenth century. This became the Stuart Highway, crossing the eastern part of Muckaty, and it was upgraded to an all-weather road in late 1940, before being bitumenised in 1944. Sources do not say who leased the property between the 1940s and 1982, at which point the lease was held by James and Miriam Hagan. In 1988 it was transferred to Hapford Pty Limited and Kerfield Pty Limited. Between 1985 and 1987 the Amadeus Gas Pipeline was built across the station, carrying gas from Palm Valley Gas Field in the Amadeus Basin to Channel Island near Darwin.

In 1991, the cattle station was taken over by the Muckaty Aboriginal Corporation. The Corporation focused on rehabilitating the land, which had been degraded by excessive numbers of cattle, and by late 1993 Muckaty had been destocked of cattle for several seasons. On 20 December 1991, the Northern Land Council lodged a claim over Muckaty on behalf of traditional owners under the Aboriginal Land Rights Act 1976. The claim was made by members of the seven groups that each has responsibility for different sites and dreamings in the area. In 1997, the Aboriginal Land Commissioner recommended that Muckaty Station be handed back to the traditional owners, and in February 1999, title to the land was returned. At the time there were about 400 formal traditional owners, among 1,000 people with traditional attachments to the land; some lived on the station, but others were elsewhere in the region, including in the nearby towns of Tennant Creek and Elliott. As Aboriginal freehold land it is inalienable communal title, and cannot be bought or sold. The pastoral lease holder and manager of the station since 1997 has been Ray Aylett. The Adelaide–Darwin railway, which passes through the western part of Muckaty Station, was completed in early 2004.

== Geology and geography ==
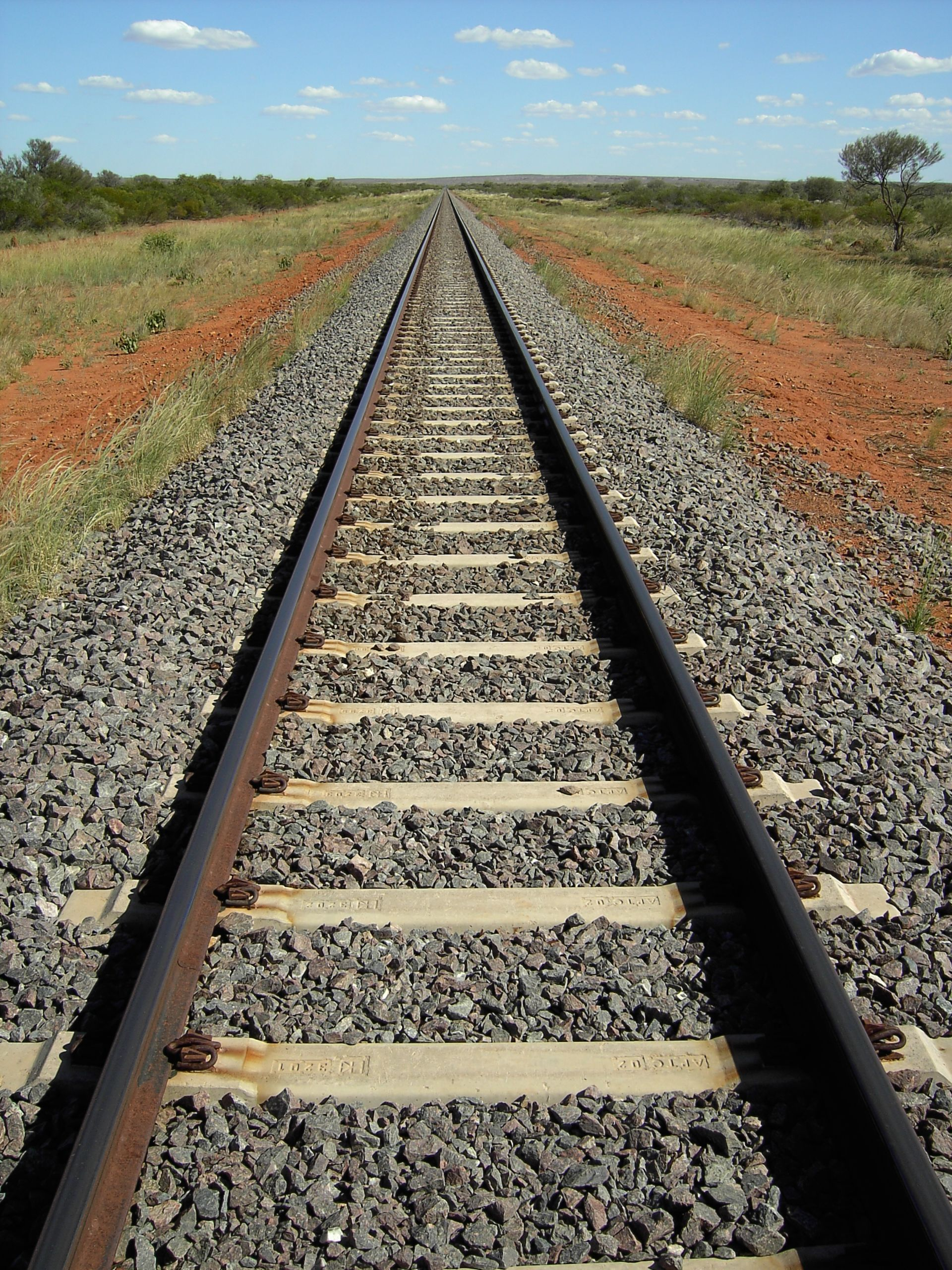
The Adelaide–Darwin railway in the region of Muckaty Station

Muckaty Station covers an area of 2,380 square kilometres (920 sq mi) and lies 110 kilometres (68 mi) north of Tennant Creek, in Australia's Northern Territory. It includes a homestead that lies 8 kilometres (5 mi) west of the Stuart Highway and 60 kilometres (37 mi) east of the railway. The residence has associated cattle yards, an airstrip, and workers' accommodation. It is adjacent to Banka Banka Station to the east, and Powell Creek Station (also referred to as an outstation) to the north.

The climate is subtropical, with a wet season between January and March, during which the area receives monthly rainfall of between 50 and 125 millimetres (2.0 and 4.9 in). For the rest of the year there is usually less than 10 millimetres (0.4 in) of rain each month.

The station's geology is dominated by the Tomkinson Group, a formation comprising sedimentary rocks of the Paleoproterozoic era that is over 1.6 billion years old. The Tomkinson Group includes layers of coarse sandstones and conglomerates, with some claystone and siltstone, deposited in a fluvial to shallow marine environment. There are also Cambrian basaltic rocks, particularly near the homestead. The eastern parts of the station form a stony plateau within the Ashburton Range. The central parts are flat and include claypans, while to the west are stony ridges. The region is drained by an ephemeral waterway, Tomkinson Creek, and is considered a good candidate to contain manganese deposits, the mineral having been extracted in the 1950s and 1960s at the Mucketty mine just east of Muckaty Station.

The region is semi-arid, and the vegetation is generally scrubland. Muckaty Station lies at the boundary of two bioregions, Tanami and Sturt Plateau. The Tanami bioregion is made up primarily of sandplains vegetated with bootlace oak (Hakea lorea), desert bloodwoods (Corymbia species), acacias and grevilleas, together with spinifex grasslands. The Sturt Plateau bioregion also includes spinifex grasslands, but with a canopy of bloodwood trees.

Most of the region's fauna is typical of desert environments. Species include the red kangaroo, the eastern wallaroo (also known as the euro), the northern nail-tail wallaby, and the spinifex hopping mouse. The central pebble-mound mouse also occurs in the region, and other mammal species including the Forrest's mouse, desert mouse and short-beaked echidna have been predicted by biologists to occur on the station. The station may lie within the range of the critically endangered night parrot (Pezoporus occidentalis). There is relatively high diversity and abundance of reptiles, including the military dragon (Ctenophorus isolepis gularis) and the sand goanna (Varanus gouldii flavirufus).

== Radioactive waste facility ==
The search for a site at which to dispose of or store Australia's low and intermediate-level radioactive wastes commenced in 1980. A formal public process of site selection that had commenced in 1991 finally failed in 2004. On 7 December 2005, the Australian government passed legislation, the Commonwealth Radioactive Waste Management Act, to facilitate the siting of a radioactive waste facility in the Northern Territory. Section four of the Act allowed the Australian government to schedule potential sites for a waste facility, and three Northern Territory sites were proposed under the legislation. Following criticisms made by the Northern Land Council, in December 2006 the legislation was revised to also allow Aboriginal Land Councils to nominate potential sites for a facility. In May 2007 the Northern Land Council, on behalf of Ngapa clan traditional owners, nominated a small area within Muckaty Station (for which the Ngapa had traditional responsibility) to be considered as a possible site for the facility. In September 2007, the government accepted the nomination, bringing the total number of possible sites to four. The Government of the Northern Territory opposed the nomination, but could not prevent it. Ngapa clan members volunteered a 4-square-kilometre (1.5 sq mi) area to be considered for the facility, which was expected to require 1 square kilometre of land.

A parliamentary inquiry and media reports indicated that the Indigenous traditional owners of Muckaty Station were divided over whether it should host a radioactive waste facility. Some members of the Ngapa clan supported hosting the facility, while other traditional owners of Muckaty opposed it. There were also claims that some members of the Ngapa clan were among those who had signed a petition opposing the facility. Political scientist Rebecca Stringer criticised the federal government's approach to the siting of the waste facility, arguing that it undermined the Indigenous owners' sovereignty and control of their own lands. Environmental organisations and the Australian Greens are opposed to using the site for a dump.

In 2009, the Australian government received a consultant's report that examined Muckaty Station as one of four possible sites for a nuclear waste facility in the Northern Territory. The report was released in 2010. In February 2012, the Muckaty Station site was the only one under consideration by the government.

=== Legal action ===
In 2010, Mark Lane Jangala and other traditional owners instructed law firms Maurice Blackburn, Surry Partners (a firm that includes human rights lawyer George Newhouse), and lawyer Julian Burnside to commence legal proceedings against the Northern Land Council and the Australian government in the Federal Court of Australia to stop the nomination of Muckaty Station as a nuclear waste storage facility. The Federal Court challenge was due to commence early in 2013 before Justice Tony North, who handled the Tampa affair. According to a June 2012 report in The Age, some indigenous owners would "testify they were never consulted, while others [will] say that they were not properly consulted and never consented to the nomination". The court did not begin hearing the case until 2 June 2014, for what was expected to be a five-week trial. However, on 18 June, the Northern Land Council withdrew the nomination of Muckaty as part of a legal settlement between the parties. The Australian government indicated there would be a three-month period during which the Northern Land Council and traditional owners could determine whether they wished to nominate an alternative site for the dump elsewhere on Muckaty Station.

== See also ==
- List of ranches and stations
