= Warumungu Sign Language =

Aboriginal sign language of Australia

- Warramunga Sign Language
- Region: North Central Desert, Australia
- Language family: Warumungu: Warumungu Sign Language

Language codes
- ISO 639-3: –
- Glottolog: None

Warumungu Sign Language is a sign language used by the Warumungu, an Aboriginal community in the central desert region of Australia. Along with Warlpiri Sign Language, it is (or perhaps was) one of the most elaborate of all Australian Aboriginal sign languages.

One known user of this sign language was Donald Jupurrula Graham who was considered to have an advanced understanding and use of the language.
