= We of the Never Never (film) =

- Directed by: Igor Auzins
- Written by: Peter Schreck
- Story by: Jeannie Gunn
- Based on: We of the Never Never
- Produced by: Greg Tepper
- Starring: Angela Punch McGregor; Arthur Dignam; John Jarratt; Tony Barry
- Cinematography: Gary Hansen
- Edited by: Clifford Hayes
- Music by: Peter Best
- Production company: Adams-Packer
- Distributed by: Umbrella Entertainment; Hoyts Distribution
- Release dates: 28 October 1982 (world premiere); 9 September 1982 (Toronto Film Festival); 11 February 1983 (U.S.)
- Running time: 134 minutes (original cut); 121 mins (commercial release)
- Country: Australia
- Language: English
- Budget: AU$3.2 million
- Box office: AU $3,112,000 (Australia)

We of the Never Never is a 1982 Australian drama film directed by Igor Auzins and starring Angela Punch McGregor, Arthur Dignam, John Jarratt, and Tony Barry. It is based on the 1908 autobiographical novel We of the Never Never by Jeannie Gunn. It was nominated for five AFI awards and earned one award for best cinematography.

== Plot ==
The film focuses on the life of Jeannie, an educated woman from the upper-middle class of society, and her story of adapting to life in the outback of Australia. Following her marriage to Aeneas Gunn who has just been made manager of a 5,334 square kilometre (2,059 sq mi) cattle station near Mataranka, called Elsey Station, Jeannie follows him from Melbourne in 1902. Some of the drovers are unhappy at first because they believe that the bush is no place for a white woman. They are wary of her and make fun of her when she and her husband arrive. However, Jeannie is determined to prove them wrong.

While her husband is away with the other men herding the cattle, Jeannie begins making friends with the Aboriginal people. Her husband and the other white men treat the local people (and Chinese workers) as inferior, often regarding them as lazy, indifferent and unreliable. However, Jeannie is sympathetic, often giving them food or trying to stop domestic disputes.

Later, Aeneas goes on a cattle muster and asks Jeannie to come along, which she does gladly. However the trip is difficult for her, riding side-saddle, she is also nearly attacked by a rogue bull. However, as time passes, things improve at the station – the house is expanded, a new Chinese cook arrives, a garden is planted and her belongings finally arrive from Melbourne.

But boredom sets in as she assumes her place – that of the station master's wife. She is asked not to help a feverish dying man, to interfere with the balance of things or to give the Aboriginal people goods meant for the working men. As a result, she spends more time with the locals, since she longs to learn and understand more about their ways. Jeannie even takes a semi-orphaned mixed-heritage child called Bett-Bett under her wing, much to the dismay of her husband.

Over time Jeannie gains the respect of the Aboriginal people and they slowly open up to her. At one point Goggle Eye, an older Aboriginal man, allows her to watch an Aboriginal dance. The stockmen, however, interrupt the "heathen" dance, shooting and shouting "God save King Edward". Later, Bett-Bett goes on walkabout and Goggle Eye becomes ill and feverish. Believing he has been affected by a singing curse, Goggle Eye passes away. The stockmen feel some mixed remorse, acknowledging their role in his death.

Soon it is Christmas and the Aboriginal people are treated a little better after what happened. In the spirit of Christmas, many of the provisions are given away and a large traditional Christmas meal is prepared for the westerners. It is here that Aeneas announces his intention, after their first year, to stay on at the station. Just when Jeannie thinks she is accustomed to life in the harsh outback, Aeneas also becomes feverish and dies, leaving her alone at the station. However, Bett-Bett returns from walkabout and asks to stay with her in the house.

== Cast ==
- Angela Punch McGregor as Jeannie Gunn
- Arthur Dignam as Aeneas Gunn
- Martin Vaughan as Dan
- John Jarratt as Dandy
- Lewis Fitz-Gerald as Jack
- Tony Barry as Mac
- Tommy Lewis as Jackaroo
- Donald Blitner as Goggle Eye
- Mawuyul Yanthalawuy as Rosie
- Cecil Parkee as Cheon
- Sibina Willy as Bett Bett
- Tex Morton as Landlord
- Kim Chiu Kok as Sam Lee
- Sally McKenzie as Carrie
- Danny Adcock as Brown

== Production ==
The film was originally to have been written by John Dingwall but he did not get along with Igor Auzins and was replaced by Peter Schreck. The original producer was John B. Murray, who was then head of production for the Adams-Packer company.

The film was shot on location in the Northern Territory at Elsey Station and Mataranka - the same setting as the novel. It was produced with the assistance of the Northern Territory Government, the Film Corporation of Western Australia, and the Victorian Film Corporation. Filming took 13 weeks from April to June in 1981.

Four weeks into the shoot the production was behind schedule. John B Murray was replaced as producer by Greg Tepper, who had been the production manager for Fred Schepisi.

The original budget was $2.5 million but the film ended up going $700,000 over due to high transportation costs. Igor Auzins later argued that pre-production on the film was not as tightly organised as it should have been.

Angela Punch McGregor later complained that only half of the script was shot:

A lot of good action scenes were cut because of the restrictions on time and budget, much to my disappointment and anger then. We ended up with a very slow-moving narrative and a more intellectual film than I had anticipated... What we have still to learn in this country is that you cannot fix up a film in the editing room.

== Release ==
A year after filming finished, the movie was screened at Cannes.

The film soundtrack by Peter Best was initially released on LP. Years later it was released again on compact disc along with "Devil in the Flesh". It features a simple but beautiful melody: part of a haunting score which is one of the best in Australia film history. The soundtrack recording was produced by Peter Best and released by Festival Records and 1M1 Records.

We of the Never Never grossed $3,112,000 at the box office in Australia, which is equivalent to $9,055,920 in 2009 dollars. The movie was also popular in England.

=== Critical reception ===
The New York Times commented:

If We of the Never Never sounds simple, old-fashioned and as suffocatingly noble as its heroine, it is. It's a film of far more anthropological than dramatic interest since much of the action involves aboriginal characters, and since it was filmed in the thinly settled region Mrs. Gunn actually visited. There is an adventure here... that children will enjoy, and the scenery is unusual. But otherwise, little of interest goes on. And the film, in depicting Jeannie's relations with the aborigines, celebrates her open-mindedness with a pride that's dated and unseemly.

Time Out London comments:

Down under, We of the Never Never is a well-loved turn-of-the-century classic by a Mrs.Aeneas Gunn, who as a genteel Melbourne bride was expected to add a woman's touch to her husband's isolated cattle station. Phlegmatic British audiences, not much in touch with the pioneer spirit, will find in this adaptation an unashamedly old-fashioned celebration of corseted pluck as Jeannie Gunn rolls up her lacey sleeves and wins the grudging respect of the hitherto misogynistic stockmen. It's a pleasurably predictable formula, kept afloat by plangent orchestration, glorious cinematography, and a continuous supply of death-beds and simple outback funerals. The film's real difficulty lies in Jeannie's treatment of the Aborigines. She's nice to them but patronising... Is Auzins inviting us to make up our own minds about her naive colonialism, or just dodging what could have been the film's central issue?

=== Awards ===
The film received six Australian Film Institute Award nominations for 1982.

=== Won ===
- Australian Film Institute 1982:
  - AFI Award – Best Achievement in Cinematography: Gary Hansen.

=== Nominated ===
- Australian Film Institute 1982:
  - AFI Award – Best Achievement in Costume Design: Camilla Rountree.
  - AFI Award – Best Actress in Lead Role: Angela Punch McGregor.
  - AFI Award – Best Film – Greg Tepper.
  - AFI Award – Best Original Music Score: Peter Best.
  - AFI Award – Best Screenplay: Peter Schreck.

== Home media ==
We of the Never Never was released on DVD by Umbrella Entertainment in June 2004. The DVD is compatible with all region codes and includes special features such as the theatrical trailer, soundtrack, an interview featurette, and a documentary.

== See also ==
- Cinema of Australia
