= Mary Alice Ward =

Australian pastoralist

- Born: 1 September 1896; Kooringa, Burra, South Australia
- Died: 27 July 1972 (aged 75)
- Occupations: Teacher; pastoralist
- Known for: Owning and operator of the Cattle Station and WWII supply camp Banka Banka Station

Mary Alice Ward (1 September 1896 – 27 July 1972) was an Australian teacher and pastoralist born at Kooringa, Burra, South Australia. She was the owner and operator of Banka Banka Station. She was known as "The Missuss of Banka Banka."

== Early life ==
Ward was the eldest of eight children of John McEntyre, an engineer from Victor Harbor, and his wife Margaret Anne. By 1904, the family had moved to the Western Australian goldfields, living first at Kalgoorlie and then Coolgardie.

== Career ==
Ward began teaching at Tunneys State School in June 1915, and gained her junior cadet training certificate in September of the next year. From 1918 to 1924 she taught at Kalgoorlie, Boulder and Carlisle. She was promoted to head teacher in 1924, and moved to Parkfield, Pingrup, Cottesloe, Wyering, Keysbrook and Latham before transferring to Wyndham, Western Australia in 1932.

On 27 December 1932, Ward married Philip "Ted" Ward, a stockman, at the office of the district registrar in Wyndham. For two years, Ward and Philip lived at Jack Kilfoyle's Rosewood station, 120 miles southeast of Wyndham. With Ward's brother Stuart, they joined the gold rush at Tennant Creek, Northern Territory, in 1935. Prospecting at a mine site that they called Blue Moon, the family struck gold, reputedly worth about $150,000. In 1941, the Wards bought the cattle station Banka Banka, where Ward supervised the development of an extensive garden.

After her husband's death in 1959, Ward continued to run Banka Banka and the family's other stations. She also owned a butcher shop at Tennant Creek, supplying it from a slaughterhouse on the property. One of her cattle managers recalled that she spent money on the welfare of her Aboriginal staff – many of whom she trained in domestic and station duties – while economizing on repairs and improvements, and eschewing new management methods. She was known to have dismissed white employees because of their ill treatment of Indigenous Australians. She acquired five houses at Tennant Creek for her old retainers and, despite objections from the local town management board, arranged for construction in 1968 and 1969 of a large red-brick building to house former employees and their relatives. The "Mary Ward Hostel," as it was known in addition to the "Pink Palace," was later used for a range of community purposes. The "Pink Palace" is currently the site of the Nyinkka Nyunyu Art and Culture Centre where over 130 Warumungu and Barkly Region artists sell their artwork.

Ward provided child care for her Warumungu employees. In the 1950s. Ward did not agree with the policies of the Stolen Generations, which removed Aboriginal children from their families. Ward paid for her Employees children to school at Our Lady of the Sacred Heart in Alice Springs at her own expense until 1961, when due to her efforts a government school opened at Banka Banka; the school's motto was 'Do it Well'.

== Death and legacy ==
In 1970, while ill health, Ward sold Banka Banka to the American silver billionaire, Howard Hunt and moved to Adelaide, back in her native South Australia. She died on 27 July 1972, at her North Adelaide home, and was buried with Catholic rites in Centennial Park Cemetery.
