= Kilfoyle =

Kilfoyle is a surname. Notable people with the surname include:

- Jack Kilfoyle (1893–1962), Australian pastoralist
- Peter Kilfoyle (born 1946), British politician
