= Thomas Brian Nugent =

Australian outlaw (1848–1911)

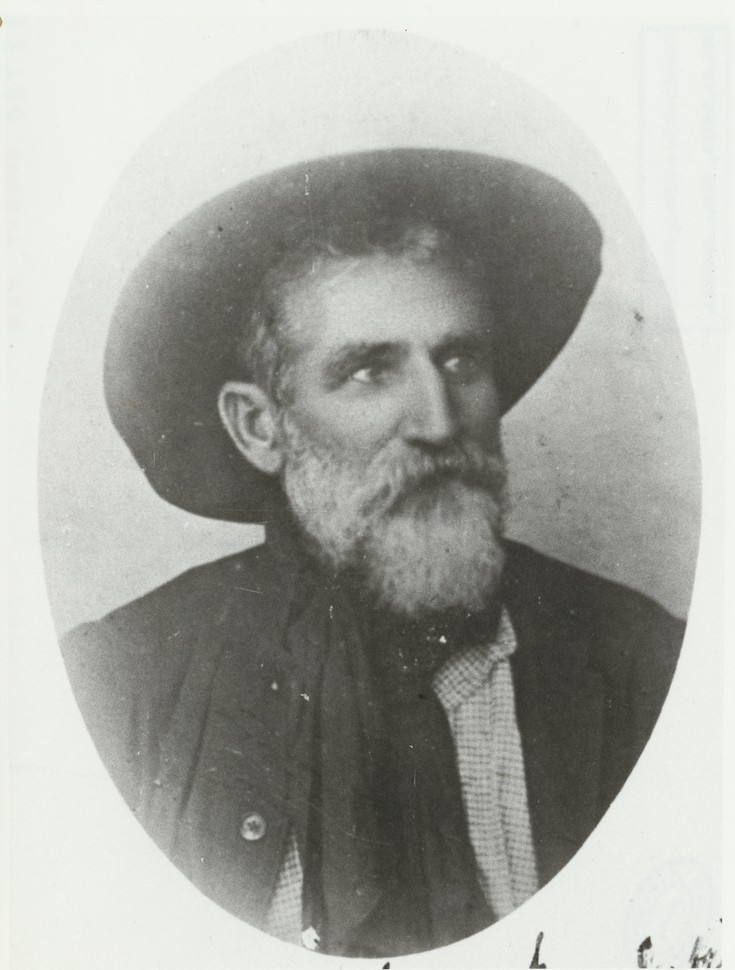

Thomas Brian Nugent also known as Tom Nugent (14 March 1848 – 11 August 1911) was a stockman, pastoralist and bushranger who spent much of his life in the Northern Territory of Australia.

== Biography ==
Nugent was born in Maitland, New South Wales and very little is known of his early life.

Nugent first came to the Northern Territory in the early 1880s via North Queensland and the Gulf country where he was working as a stockman. When he arrived he went by the name of Holmes, the reason for which is unknown, and travelled alongside another stockman Jim Fitzgerald. Nugent became a stockman and later manager of Lake Nash Station, 8 kilometres (5.0 mi) east of Alpurrurulam, until the station was sold to another owner in 1882 at which point he began working at a number of other cattle stations in the area.

In 1885 when Nugent was working at Eva Downs Station he heard news of a goldrush at Halls Creek in Western Australia and travelled there alongside a group of 12 other who had been 'collected' from a number of locations. One their way to the goldfield they passed Nat Buchanan, who was travelling with his son Gordon, and he noticed that they were travelling as a group of 13, which he called "the Devil's number" and dubbed them The Ragged Thirteen. Nugent was widely recognised as their leader.

Together the group plagued the Halls Creek goldfields and the surrounding country as bushrangers between 1885 and 1887 after which point they disbanded. In one instance of theft that group travelled to Victoria River Downs Station, where Nugent introduced himself as Lockhart, and while he and the manager Lindsay Crawford were playing cards that rest of the group removed the planks from the side of the store and took all of the horseshoes stored there; these were then incredibly valuable in such a remote location.

Author Ernestine Hill when writing of Nugent and The Ragged Thirteen believed they never found gold at Halls Creek and, in summation, stated:

This, so far as I can find is the whole authentic story, though romance has gilded the exploits of the Ragged Thirteen. At Hall's Creek they suffered the laws of retribution. The faith that moved mountains yielded never an ounce. All the gold that might have been there was gone. Two years of digging and with everyone else they drifted away from the place. Most of them followed the gold trails down through West Australia. Now they are legend.

— Ernestine Hill, The Ragged Thirteen - a legend of the Outback, The Advertiser (Adelaide), 12 August 1939

Around 1887 Nugent returned to the Northern Territory where alongside Robert (Bob) Anderson, a fellow member of The Ragged Thirteen who had worked with him at Eva Downs, established pastoral leases at Tobermorey and Banka Banka. During this early period Nugent also worked for a time as a linesman on the Overland Telegraph Line.

It was reported in 1900, by John Archibald Graham Little, the senior telegraph officer, that Nugent had formed a "nice station" at Banka Banka and that "a small garden at the homestead yields an ample supply of all kinds of vegetables of remarkable size and quality".

In 1902 William Linklater, known then as Billy Miller, came to work on Banka Banka and together the pair were involved in cattle stealing, most often stealing cattle from across the border in either Queensland or Western Australia. Linklater would later leave there to be a prospector in Halls Creek. Later, in 1941, Linklater wrote an account of The Ragged Thirteen which he had learned from Nugent which was never published; Linklater was also used as a source by Ernestine Hill about them.

In July 1911 while unwell Nugent travelled to the Tennant Creek Telegraph Station, near Tennant Creek (Jurnkkurakurr), for treatment. He died there on 11 August 1911 and was buried there.
