= Goodenia nigrescens =

Scientific classification
- Kingdom: Plantae
- Clade: Tracheophytes
- Clade: Angiosperms
- Clade: Eudicots
- Clade: Asterids
- Order: Asterales
- Family: Goodeniaceae
- Genus: Goodenia
- Species: G. nigrescens

Binomial name
- Goodenia nigrescens Carolin

Species of plant

Goodenia nigrescens is a species of flowering plant in the family Goodeniaceae and is endemic to northern Australia. It is an erect herb with narrow oblong to lance-shaped leaves on the stems and racemes of orange-yellow flowers.

== Description ==
Goodenia nigrescens is an erect herb that typically grows to a height of 20 cm (7.9 in) and is more or less glaucous. The leaves are mostly scattered along the stems and are narrow oblong to lance-shaped with the narrower end towards the base and usually toothed or lobed, 20–50 mm (0.79–1.97 in) long and 3–5 mm (0.12–0.20 in) wide. The flowers are arranged in racemes up to 100 mm (3.9 in) long on a peduncle 5–12 mm (0.20–0.47 in) long, each flower on a pedicel 1–2 mm (0.039–0.079 in) long with leaf-like bracts and linear bracteoles 2–3 mm (0.079–0.118 in) long. The sepals are lance-shaped to elliptic, 4–5 mm (0.16–0.20 in) long, the petals orange-yellow and about 18 mm (0.71 in) long. The lower lobes of the corolla are about 7 mm (0.28 in) long with wings about 2.5–3 mm (0.098–0.118 in) wide. Flowering mainly occurs from May to August and the fruit is a compressed oval capsule 10–15 mm (0.39–0.59 in) long.

== Taxonomy and naming ==
Goodenia nigrescens was first formally described in 1990 Roger Charles Carolin in the journal Telopea from specimens collected in 1960 on Banka Banka Station by George Chippendale. The specific epithet (nigrescens) means "becoming black", referring to the tendency of the plant to turn black when dried.

== Distribution and habitat ==
This goodenia grows in grey and black soils on the Barkly Tableland, and in Queensland.

== Conservation status ==
Goodenia nigrescens is classified as "data deficient" under the Northern Territory Government Territory Parks and Wildlife Conservation Act 1976 but as of "least concern" under the Queensland Government Nature Conservation Act 1992.
