= Kunapa =

The Kunapa are a clan of Indigenous Australian families of Central Australia who traditionally lived to the north of Tennant Creek, Northern Territory.

== Language ==
The Kunapa speak a Warumungu dialect.

== Country ==
The Kunapa's traditional lands lie on the Western Barkly Tablelands of Central Australia, and include territory in the areas of the Banka Banka, Brunchilly, and Elroy Downs pastoral leases.

== History ==
The Kunapa were alienated from their original homelands with the development of pastoralism. and subsequently were concentrated in towns like Tennant Creek. In the last decades two Kunapa communities, the Ngurrara and Kurnturlpara, have been re-establishing outstations in houses they had once owned in the western areas of Barkly Tableland.

== Destruction of a sacred site ==
The mining corporation, OM Manganese, was fined $150,000 in 2013 for having desecrated a site known as "Two Women Sitting Down" at the Bootu Creek Manganese Mine. The Kunapa are one of the traditional custodians of this area. (Note: Other groups with claims to the Bootu Creek area are the Mangirraji, Jalajirrpa, Yap Yap and Pirrtangu.)

== Native title ==
Kunapa land claims are represented by the Manungurra Aboriginal Corporation.

== Sources ==
- Baker, Colin (26 July 2016). "An Aboriginal College for a return to Country: Designing a school that prepares children to live in two worlds and the space between". International Education Journal:Comparative Perspectives. 15 (2): 1–12.
- Graeme, Smith; Gordon, Noonan; Stuart, Philipot; Jerry, Jacobs (17 June 2015). "Who mind the miners?" (PDF). AIATSIS.
- Jabour, Bridie (2 August 2013). "Mining company fined $150k for desecrating Aboriginal sacred site". The Guardian.
- Kane, Annie (26 July 2016). "People-powered: renewable energy project changes Indigenous lives in Barkly". The Guardian.
- "Mining firm desecrated Australia Aboriginal site". BBC News. 2 August 2013.
