= The Little Black Princess =

Children's novel written by Australian author Jeannie Gunn in 1905

The Little Black Princess: a True Tale of Life in the Never-Never Land is a 1905 children's novel by the Australian author Jeannie Gunn.

== Description ==
The book is a fictionalised account of the early life of a small Aboriginal girl who took refuge with Mrs Gunn for a short time in 1902. The child is named Bett-Bett in the novel, and is based on the experiences of a young Dolly Bonson at Elsey Station. The young Dolly was said by Mrs Gunn in 1937 to have been a niece of Ibimel Wooloomool, whom she described as "the King or Chief of the Elsey River tribes".

== Later life of Bett-Bett ==
In a 1937 article for the Sydney Morning Herald, Jeannie Gunn wrote that the child on whom Bett-Bett was based was moved to Darwin as a playmate and guardian for some younger children and later worked there in domestic service as a house and parlour maid, before marrying and raising two boys and a girl. In 1929 she converted to the Church of England. In 1969 Dolly was baptised into the Seventh-day Adventist Church in Darwin. She died in 1988, aged 95.

== Legacy ==
In 1991 Elsey Land Claim No 132 was lodged by the Northern Land Council for what had been the old Elsey cattle station. The Aboriginal Land Commissioner, Justice Gray referenced Gunn's work in trying to establish which groups were traditional owners of the various areas.

A memorial has been erected over Dolly Bonson's grave at Elsey Cemetery which discusses her depiction in this novel..
