= Mary Laughren =

Australian linguist

Mary Laughren is an Australian linguist, known for her research on Australian Aboriginal languages. As of April 2018, Laughren is an Honorary Research Senior Fellow at the School of Languages and Comparative Cultural Studies at the University of Queensland.

== Career ==
Laughren received her PhD from Université de Nice Sophia-Antipolis in 1973. Laughren has played a key role in the documentation of the Warlpiri Language, with notable contributions to the understanding of song register and baby talk register. She was the editor of the Warlpiri-English encyclopedic dictionary (Laughren et al. 2022), which was short-listed for the 2023 Australian Book Industry Awards.

In 2014 the book Language Description Informed by Theory was dedicated to Mary Laughren, whose work "demonstrates what linguistic theory brings to language documentation, where language is recognized as an abstract, highly organized system, with usage subject to context, and which serves a multitude of functions within a particular culture and society" (editors' Introduction, p. 4)

Her other research interests include language in education, lexicography and the semantic-syntactic interface. She has also been the puzzles co-coordinator for OzCLO, a member of the IOL. From 1996-1998 Laughren was the President of Australex, and served on its board until 2000. In 2005 Laughren shared the Linguistics Society of America Summer Institute Inaugural Ken Hale Chair with Jane Simpson and David Nash.

== Key publications ==
Laughren, Mary with Hale, Kenneth, Nungarrayi, Jeannie Egan, Jangala, Marlurrku Paddy Patrick, Hoogenraad, Robert, Nash, David and Simpson, Jane (2022). Warlpiri Encyclopaedic Dictionary, The Australian Institute of Aboriginal and Torres Strait Islander Studies: Australian Studies Press.

Laughren, Mary (2013). Bamanan-kan. In Dragomir Radev (Ed.), Puzzles in Logic, Languages and Computation: The Green Book (pp. 88–90) Heidelberg, Germany: Springer.

Laughren, Mary (2010). Warlpiri verbs of change and causation: The thematic core. In Mengistu Amberber, Brett Baker and Mark Harvey (Ed.), Complex predicates: Cross-linguistic perspectives on event structure (pp. 167–236) Cambridge, U.K.: Cambridge University Press.

Laughren, Mary, Pensalfini, Rob and Mylne, Tom (2005). Accounting for verb-initial order in an Australian language. In Carnie, Andrew, Harley, Heidi and Dooley, Sheila Ann (Ed.), Verb First: On the syntax of verb-initial languages 1st ed. (pp. 367–401) Amsterdam: John Benjamins Publishing Company.

Laughren, Mary (2002). Syntactic Constraints in a 'Free Word Order' Language. In Amberber, Mengistu and Collins, Peter (Ed.), Language Universals and Variation 1st ed. (pp. 83–130) Westport, Connecticut: Praeger Publishers.

Laughren, Hoogenraad, Hale, Granites (1996). A Learner's Guide to Warlpiri: Tape course for beginners, IAD Press, Alice Springs.

Hale, Kenneth, Mary Laughren and Jane Simpson (1995) 'Warlpiri.' In J. Jacobs, A. von Stechow, W. Sternefeld, and T. Venneman, eds., Syntax: An International Handbook of Contemporary Research, vol. 2. pp. 1430–1451. Berlin: Walter de Gruyter.

Mary Laughren (1984) Warlpiri Baby talk, Australian Journal of Linguistics, 4:1, 73-88
