= Gillian Wigglesworth =

Australian linguist

- Born: 18 August 1951 (age 74); England
- Known for: First language acquisition
- Scientific career
- Fields: First language acquisition
- Institutions: University of Melbourne
- Website: Wigglesworth on the website of the University of Melbourne

Professor Gillian Wigglesworth FAHA is an Australian linguist, Redmond Barry Distinguished Professor in Linguistics and Applied Linguistics, and former Deputy Dean of the Faculty of Arts at The University of Melbourne.

== Career ==
Wigglesworth holds a Ph.D. in Linguistics from La Trobe University (Melbourne, Australia). She is a member of the School of Languages and Linguistics at the University of Melbourne, where she was founding Director of the Research Unit for Indigenous Language. She was Chief Investigator, with Jane Simpson and Patrick McConvell, in the Aboriginal Child Language Acquisition Projects, funded by ARC Discovery Grants (2004–2007, 2011–2015), and was a Chief Investigator in the Australian Research Council (ARC) Centre of Excellence for the Dynamics of Language. In 2016, she was also Deputy Dean of the Faculty of Arts at The University of Melbourne, and in 2011 she was the Vice President of the International Language Testing Association.

She was elected a Fellow of the Australian Academy of the Humanities in 2023.

== Research ==
Her research interests focus on language acquisition, including first language acquisition, second language acquisition, language teaching, testing and assessment, and bilingualism, particularly the home and school languages of Indigenous Australian children living in remote communities.

== Key publications ==
- (2005) Murray D. and G. Wigglesworth. First Language Support in Adult ESL in Australia. Sydney: Macquarie University.
- (2007) Ng, B. and G. Wigglesworth. Bilingualism: an advanced resource book. Routledge.
- (2008) Simpson, J. and G. Wigglesworth. Children's language and multilingualism: Indigenous language use at home and school. London: Continuum.
- (2013) Meakins, F. and G. Wigglesworth. 'How much input is enough? Correlating comprehension and child language input in an endangered language.' Journal of Multilingual & Multicultural Development, Multilingual Matters, vol. 34, issue 2, pp. 171–188.
- (2013) Loakes, D., K. Moses, G. Wigglesworth, J. Simpson and R. Billington. 'Children's language input: A study of a remote multilingual Indigenous Australian community.' Multilingua, vol. 32, issue 5, pp. 683–711.
- (2018) Wigglesworth, G, J. Simpson & J. Vaughan (eds). Language Practices of Indigenous Children and Youth: The Transition from Home to School. London: Palgrave Macmillan UK.

== See also ==
- Second language writing
- Neomy Storch
