= Helen Springs Station =

Pastoral lease in the Northern Territory

Coordinates: 18.43274°S 133.87607°E

Location in Northern Territory

Helen Springs Station more commonly known as Helen Springs is a pastoral lease that operates as a cattle station.

It is located about 104 kilometres (65 mi) south of Elliott and 340 kilometres (211 mi) east of Kalkaringi in the Northern Territory of Australia. The property shares a boundary with Banka Banka to the south, Eva Downs to the east, Ucharonidge and Tandyidgee to the north and Muckaty and Powell Creek Station to the west.

== History ==
The station was founded prior to 1885 with Messrs Douglas and Hemphill's "stock ... running near Helen's Springs near Tompkinson Creek on the telegraph line".

Composed primarily of open grazing land the property occupies an area of 10,198 square kilometres (3,937 sq mi).

Following a dry season in 1928, heavy rains came at the start of the wet season in 1929 causing the creeks to flood and waters to wash away several fences and large river gums.

Edith Bohning and her daughters, Esther and Elsie, became known as the "petticoat drovers" when the two girls took a mob of cattle from Alice Springs to Adelaide by train in 1929. Mr. Bohning was asked by a railway inspector how the two women would cope to which he replied "if those two ladies can’t handle the situation then it will be no use getting your men to try."

Helen Springs was acquired by the Vestey Group in 1944 as well as some other smaller holdings in the area as part of extending their operations in the Northern Territory.

The Vestey Group had become interested in using road trains to move stock instead of overlanding using drovers in the 1950s. They hired Stan Mason who arrived at the station in 1951 then worked with Kurt Johannsen in Alice Springs in 1954 to ultimately develop the Rotinoff Viscount, the first of which arrived in Australia in 1957.

Peter Sherwin was the head stockman at Helen Springs in 1953, when it was still owned by Vesteys. Sherwin later purchased a string of properties including Victoria River Downs Station in 1986.

The Barkly Tableland area was struck by drought in 1958 from Helen Springs through Brunette Downs and onto Eva Downs being the worst affected areas.

The property was one of fifteen owned by the Vestey Group in Northern Australia during the 1970s. Tim Doran was the station manager from 1972 to 1981 and had about 20 employees at this time.

Vesteys sold a large number of cattle stations in 1992 including Helen Springs which was acquired by Stanbroke Pastoral Company. Stanbroke then sold Helen Springs to S. Kidman & Co. in 2004 following a buyout in the parent company by Peter Menegazzo. Stanbroke was also selling several other properties in the central Queensland region.

In 2008 a nine-year-old boy was bitten by a king brown snake, one of the most venomous snakes in the world. The boy had picked up the 6-foot (2 m) snake and swung it around his head before it bit him on the arm. The Royal Flying Doctor Service took the boy to Alice Springs Hospital. He received antivenom and survived the bite.

A 23-year-old mechanic was killed at the property in February 2012 in a workplace accident when moving steel with a bobcat.

In October 2012 Chris Townes, the manager of Helen Springs, paid A$28,000 at auction for a Charbray bull; this is a record price for a Charbray in Australia, the bull will join 14 others bought at the same auction to join the Brahman–Charbray breeding operation at the station.

The Barkly Tableland and other areas of northern Australia are prone to infestations of Calotropis procera, which is slowly becoming more widespread. Research is being conducted at Helen Springs to study how the species invades grazing lands.

== See also ==
- List of ranches and stations
- List of the largest stations in Australia
