= Ucharonidge Station =

Cattle station in the Northern Territory, Australia

Coordinates: 17.67487°S 134.25056°E

Location in Northern Territory

Ucharonidge Station is a pastoral lease that operates as a cattle station in the Northern Territory of Australia.

The property is situated approximately 76 kilometres (47 mi) east of Elliott and 130 kilometres (81 mi) north of Tennant Creek on the Barkly Tableland. It is operated in conjunction with Newcastle Waters and Dungowan Stations. The property shares a boundary with Beetaloo Station to the north, Mungabroom to the east, Helen Springs Station to the south and Tandyidgee to the west.

It currently occupies an area of 2,479 square kilometres (957 sq mi) and carries approximately 20,000 head of cattle.

Paul and Florence Beebe drew Ucharonidge lease in a land ballot in 1948. The station was established in 1949 when the Beebe family moved onto the land. Initially the property occupied an area of 958 square miles (2,481 km^{2}). By 1951 Ucharonidge, and most of the Northern pastoral lands, were struck by a serious drought, with bushfires destroying 300 square miles (777 km^{2}) and killing over 2,000 head of cattle. The Beebes left the property for a year until good rains fell.

The Beebes were among the first to introduce Brahman cattle onto the Barkly tableland in the 1960s. In the mid-1960s William James (Mick) and his brother Roy bought the property from their father. Mick Beebe died in 2004 after years spent improving the herd at Ucharonidge.

In 2008 the Consolidated Pastoral Company acquired Ucharonidge from the Beebe family paying about A$28 million.

== See also ==
- List of ranches and stations
