= Jane Simpson (linguist) =

Australian linguist

Jane Simpson FASSA FAHA is an Australian linguist and professor emerita at Australian National University.

Simpson completed both a B.A. (Hons) and M.A. (1977) at The Australian National University. Her B.A. included majors in Chinese and English literature, with Honours in Middle English. Jane's PhD. was received from MIT in 1983, and her dissertation was a detailed study of Warlpiri in the Lexical-Functional Grammar framework.

Simpson's research focuses on the Indigenous languages of Australia. She has worked extensively with the Warumungu language, and in this work assisted in setting up a language centre in Tennant Creek. She also helped to create the a digital archive of Aboriginal language material, which became ASEDA. This was during her time as a visiting fellow at the Australian Institute of Aboriginal Studies. She has published on a wide range of topics related to the languages of Australia, including language change, discourse and grammatical structure, morphosyntax, semantics, and lexicon. She was Chief Investigator, with Gillian Wigglesworth and Patrick McConvell, in the Aboriginal Child Language Acquisition Projects, funded by ARC Discovery Grants (2004–2007, 2011–2015).

In 2005, Simpson shared the Linguistics Society of America Summer Institute Inaugural Ken Hale Chair with Mary Laughren and David Nash. She is now Deputy Director of the Centre of Excellence for the Dynamics of Language at ANU. From 1989–2010 Simpson taught at The University of Sydney in their linguistics department. From 2011–2014 she was the inaugural chair of Indigenous linguistics and head of the School of Literature, Languages and Linguistics at ANU.

In 2020 Simpson was elected a Fellow both of the Academy of the Social Sciences in Australia and the Australian Academy of the Humanities.

== Selected publications ==
- (2018) Wigglesworth, G, J. Simpson & J. Vaughan (eds). Language Practices of Indigenous Children and Youth: The Transition from Home to School. London: Palgrave Macmillan UK.
- (2013) Simpson, J. 'What's done and what's said: language attitudes, public language activities and everyday talk in the Northern Territory of Australia.' Journal of Multilingual and Multicultural Development, vol. 34, pp. 1–16.
- (2012) Nash, D. & J. Simpson. 'Toponymy: recording and analyzing placenames in a language area.' In Nicholas Thieberger (ed.), The Oxford Handbook of Linguistic Fieldwork, pp. 392–404. Oxford: Oxford University Press.
- (2012) Simpson, J. 'Information structure, variation and the Referential Hierarchy/' in F. Seifart, G. Haig, N. P. Himmelmann, D. Jung, A. Margetts & P. Trilsbeek (ed.), Potentials of Language Documentation: Methods, Analyses, and Utilization, pp/ 73–82. Honolulu: University of Hawaii Press.
- (2011) Wigglesworth, G., J. Simpson & D. Loakes. 'NAPLAN language assessments for indigenous children in remote communities: Issues and problems.' Australian Review of Applied Linguistics (print edition), vol. 34, no. 3, pp. 320–343.
- (2008) Simpson, J. & G. Wigglesworth (eds). Children's Language and Multilingualism: Indigenous Language Use at Home and School. London: Continuum.
- (2001) Simpson, J., D. Nash, M. Laughren, et al. (eds). Forty years on: Ken Hale and Australian languages. Canberra: Pacific Linguistics.
- (1991) Simpson, J., Warlpiri morpho-syntax: a lexicalist approach. Dordrecht; Boston: Kluwer Academic.
