= Jack Kilfoyle =

John Augustus Charles Kilfoyle (9 December 1893 – 26 May 1962), known as Jack Kilfoyle, was a pastoralist born in Palmerston, Northern Territory, a suburb of Darwin. He is primarily known as a successful owner and manager of land across Australia, most notably his father's Rosewood station.

== Early life ==
Jack was the only child of Thomas Kilfoyle, a farmer from Ireland, and his native-born wife Catherine. In 1882 and 1883, Tom had led an overlanding party with his relatives, the Duracks and the Byrnes, and established Rosewood station, which extended from the eastern Kimberley region of Western Australia into the present Northern Territory. Jack was educated in the early 1900s at Christian Brothers' College in Perth. Although he had lost the sight in one eye as the result of an insect bite that became infected, he proved an excellent athlete. On his father's death in 1908, he inherited a share in Rosewood. Jack worked on the property from 1915 and took over its management in March 1922.

== Land owner ==
During the next 25 years, Kilfoyle built a reputation as a successful owner-manager on a medium-sized property of 734,000 acres (2,970 km^{2}) on what was known as a "big man's frontier," increasingly dominated by companies and absentee proprietors. Having improved his beef Shorthorns with a strain of "milk" bulls acquired from Nestlé & Anglo Swiss Condensed Milk Co. (Australasia) Ltd., he put his profits into improving the property by fencing, paddocking and providing watering-places. A federal board of inquiry into land policy in 1937 praised Kilfoyle's thorough management and close supervision of Rosewood.

== Legal troubles ==
In 1932, Kilfoyle was charged with the theft of some part-Devon bulls from the Wyndham Freezing, Canning & Meat Works. He was sentenced to two years imprisonment in a Wyndham jail. At a retrial, the sentence was commuted to a fine. In 1938, he was sued for breach of promise by May Dorothy Hayes, daughter of his father's former partner. She sought damages of more than $15,000 and received about $1,300. Kilfoyle's only comment was reportedly, "Oh dear...these women are expensive."

== Rich married man ==
On 23 February 1939, Kilfoyle married Thelma Ada Hope Ryan at St. Mary's Catholic Cathedral in Perth. His fortunes prospered during World War II and in 1947 he sold Rosewood, fully stocked, for well over $100,000. He established a trust of some $15,000 for the Aborigines on his property, then moved with his wife to Sydney and then Melbourne. His collection of Australian stamps was to be valued at $60,000 in 1961. The Kilfoyles moved to Berkeley Square, London, in 1952 but returned to Perth in 1961. Kilfoyle died of emphysema and bronchitis on 26 May 1962 in Perth and was buried in a cemetery in Karrakatta, Western Australia.
