= Tennant Creek Telegraph Station =

Historic building in the Northern Territory

Coordinates: 19.5555°S 134.2286°E

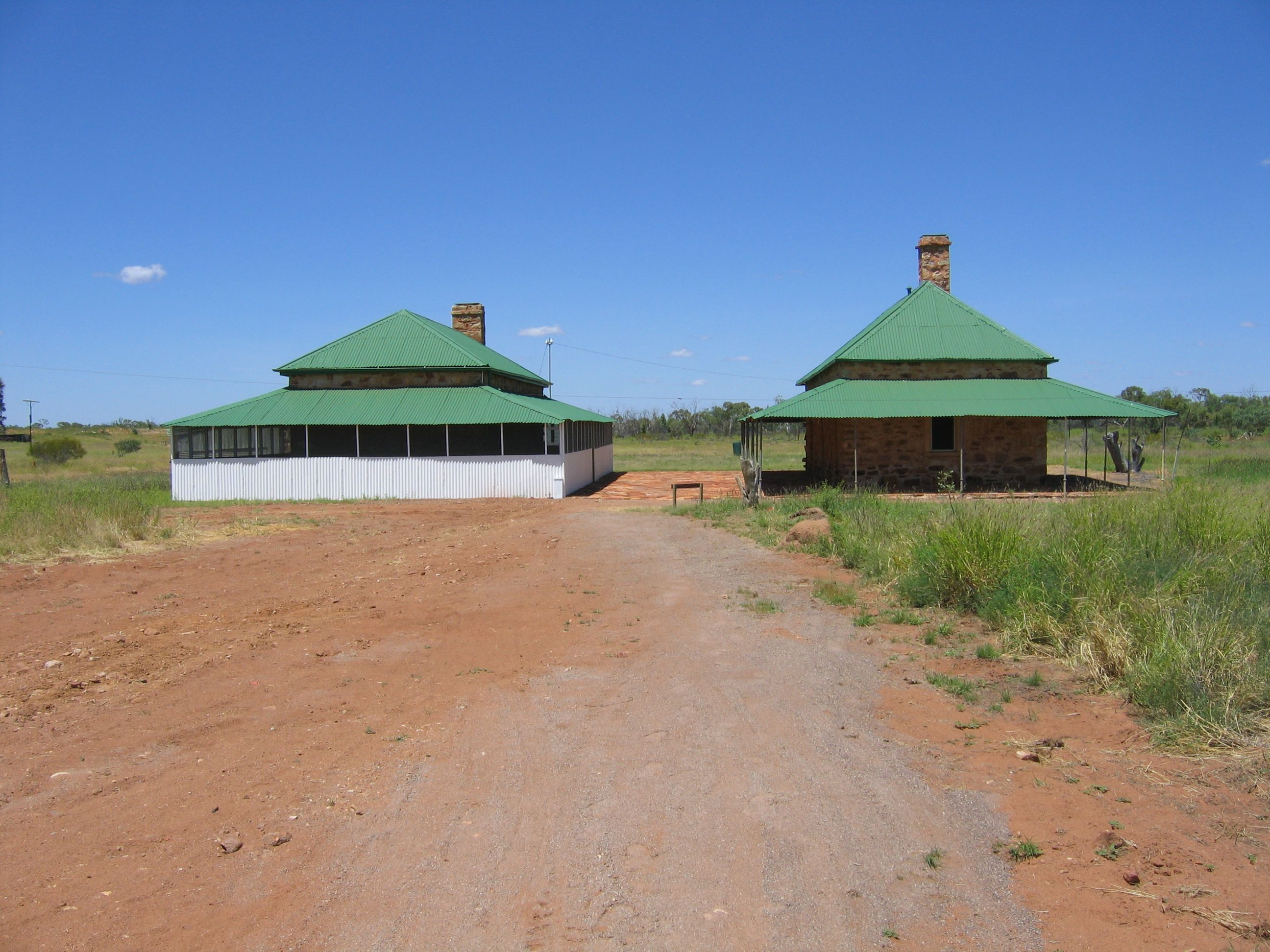
Tennant Creek Telegraph Station

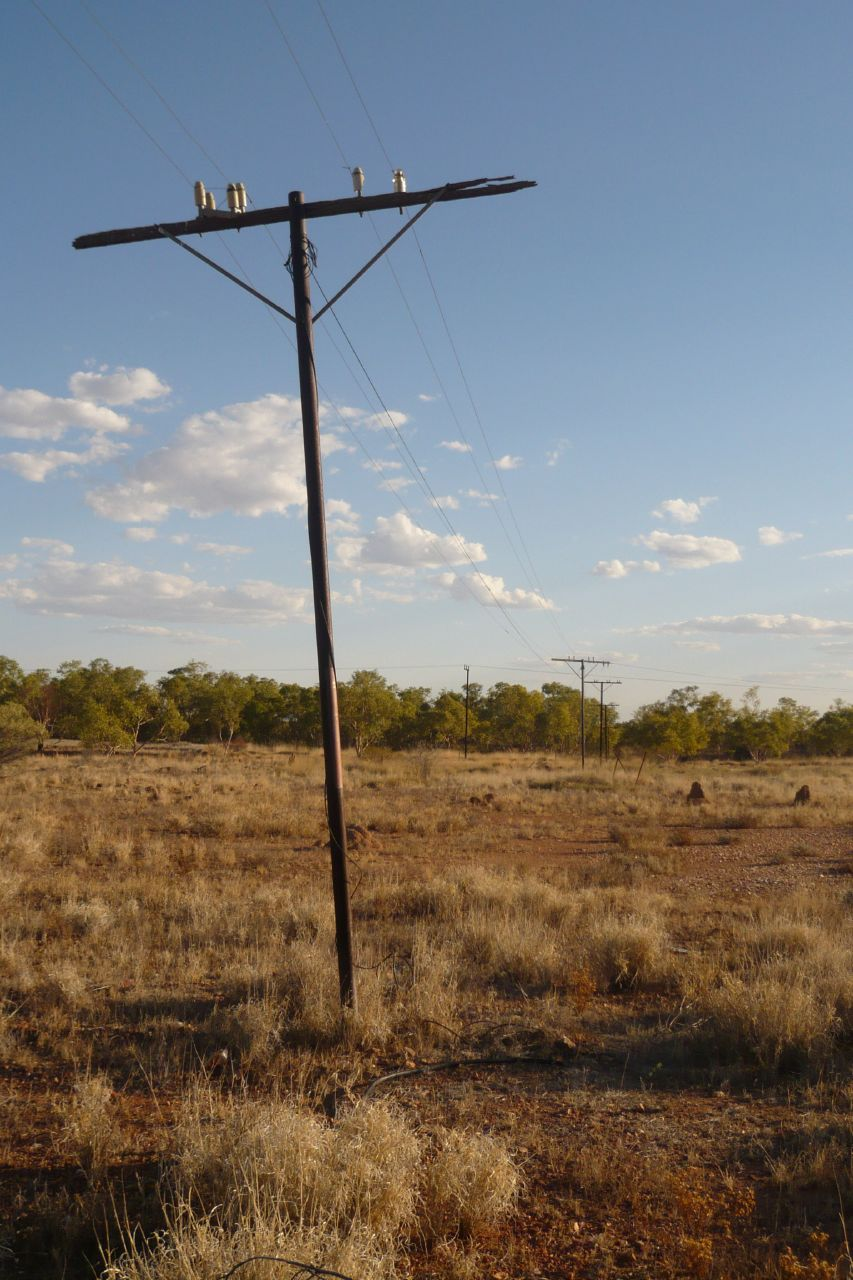
Adelaide-Darwin Telegraph Line

The Tennant Creek Telegraph Station is an historical site about 16 kilometres north of Tennant Creek in the Northern Territory of Australia.

== History ==
The Warumungu Aboriginal people were the first occupants of the region in and around Tennant Creek. The telegraph station is near a very significant sacred site called "Jurnkurakurr", which is home to a Dreamtime being called "Jalawala", a black-nosed python.

The Tennant Creek Telegraph Station was built in 1872. It was first a temporary bush timber building but by 1875 had been rebuilt with locally quarried stone. It operated as a repeater station as part of the Overland Telegraph Line which connected Darwin to Adelaide. It also operated as a government rations depot. By the 1920s it featured a blacksmith shop, cart shed, ration store, meat house, smokehouse and cellar. Warumungu people were employed at the station as cattlemen and slaughter-men. By the 1890s more than 100 Aboriginal people were living at the station. It was declared an Aboriginal Reserve.

The search for gold began from the 1880s. In 1925, a linesman discovered gold, with the discovery quickly leading to the establishment of a township to the south of the telegraph station. In 1935 a post and wireless office became operational in the town of Tennant Creek itself, so that the telegraph station was closed. It then reverted to a rations depot, supplying meat to the new town and water from its bore until 1966.

== Postmasters ==
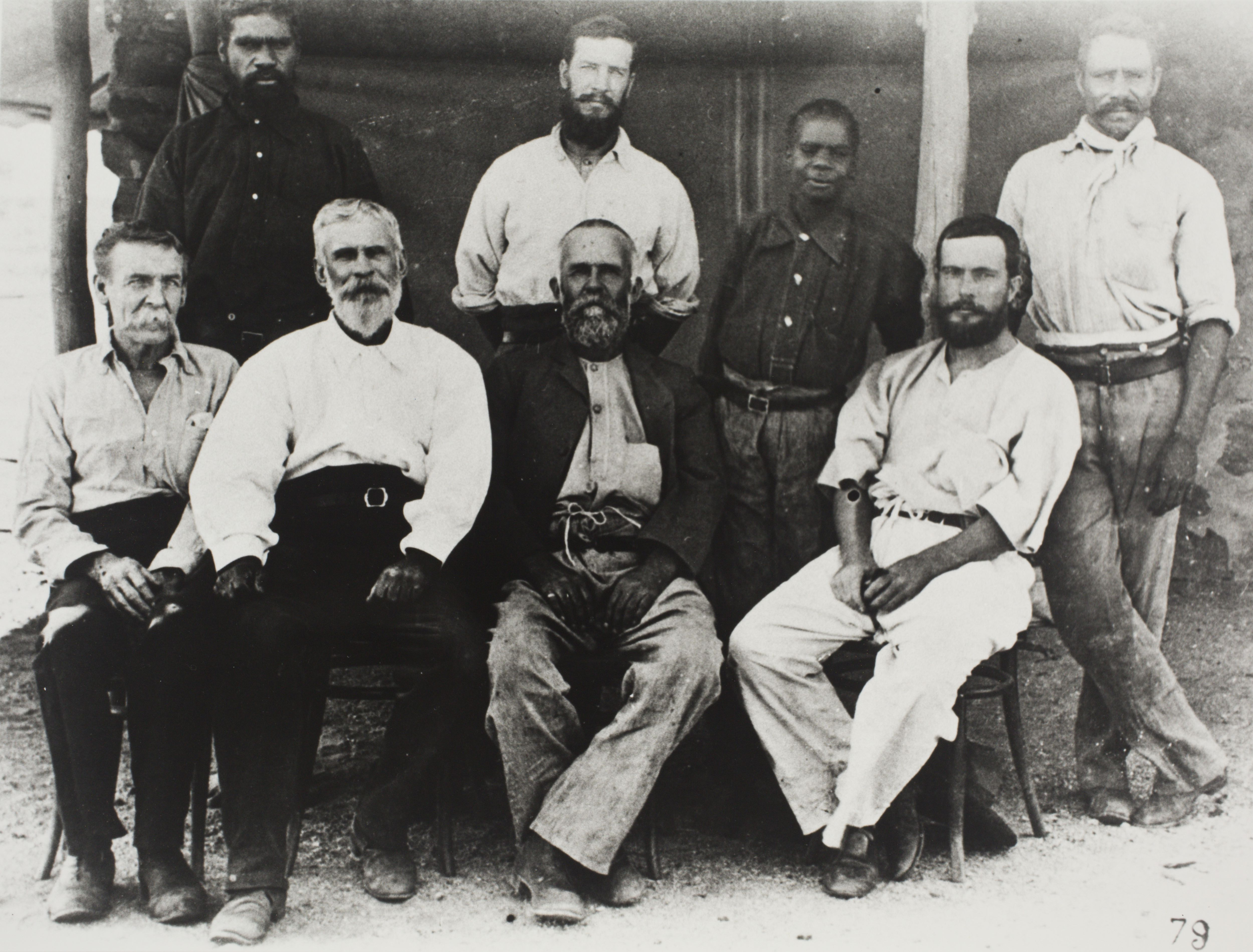
Staff of the Tennant Creek Overland Telegraph Line.

Postmasters/Managers	From	To
Alan M. Giles	1875	1888
Henry Herbert Dixon	1915	1923
J. W. M. Phillips	1926	1927

== Recent history ==
The station was listed on the now-defunct Register of the National Estate on 25 March 1986. The station was listed on the Northern Territory Heritage Register on 4 July 2001. The land including the Telegraph Station and its immediate surroundings was originally proposed in 1987 as a historical reserve known as the Tennant Creek Telegraph Station Historical Reserve but progress was delayed by a claim on the land made under Aboriginal Land Rights Act (Northern Territory) in 1980 . The claim was resolved in August 2001 with the historical reserve awaiting official naming in April 2002. Significant restoration work was undertaken on the remaining station buildings in 2012.
