= We of the Never Never =

1908 autobiographical novel by Jeannie Gunn

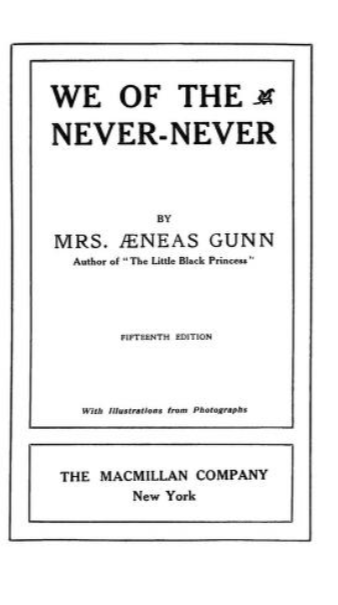
- Title page for We of the Never Never (1907)
- Author: Jeannie Gunn, writing under the name of Mrs Aeneas Gunn
- Language: English
- Subject: Life in the bush in Australia in the early 20th century
- Set in: Northern Territory, Australia
- Publication date: 1907
- Publication place: Australia
- ISBN: 0 09 148321 2

We of the Never Never is an autobiographical novel by Jeannie Gunn first published in 1907. Although published as a novel, it is an account of the author's experiences in 1902 at Elsey Station near Mataranka, Northern Territory in which she changed the names of people to obscure their identities. She published the book under the name Mrs Aeneas Gunn, using her husband's first and last name. Over the years, newspapers and magazine articles chronicled the fortunes of the Elsey characters. Jeannie outlived all but Bett-Bett.

== Background ==
Gunn was the first white woman to settle in the Mataranka area. Her husband Aeneas was a partner in the Elsey cattle station on the Roper River, some 483 km (300 miles) south of Darwin. On 2 January 1902 the couple sailed from Melbourne for Port Darwin so that he could take up a job as the station's new manager. In Palmerston, Gunn was discouraged from accompanying her husband to the station on the basis that as a woman she would be "out of place" on a station such as the Elsey. However, she travelled south and her book describes the journey, settling in, and the difficulties of life in the bush. Jeannie Gunn lived on the cattle station for about a year before her husband, Aeneas, died of malarial dysentery on 16 March 1903. Jeannie returned to Melbourne shortly afterwards and never returned to the Northern Territory.

There is a replica of the homestead depicted in We of the Never Never at the Mataranka Homestead accommodation close to the township of Mataranka.

== Publication history ==
We of the Never Never was first published in London by Hutchinson after being rejected by six publishers. It was translated into German in 1927. By 1945, 320,000 copies of the book had been sold. This novel, together with her other book, was adapted for Australian schools. By 1990 over a million copies of the book had been sold.

== Significance ==
The book is regarded as being significant as a precursor of the 1930s landscape writers. Already in 1908 Australia was a significantly urbanised country and the book was seen to provide symbols of things that made Australia different from anywhere else, underwriting an Australian legend of life and achievement in the outback, where "men and a few women still lived heroic lives in rhythm with the gallop of a horse" in "forbidding faraway places".

In 1988 the book was referred to as a "minor masterpiece of Australian letters" by Penguin's New Literary History of Australia.

== Film ==
The book was made into a film also called We of the Never Never in 1982 and shot on location in the Northern Territory - the setting of the novel.

== Characters ==
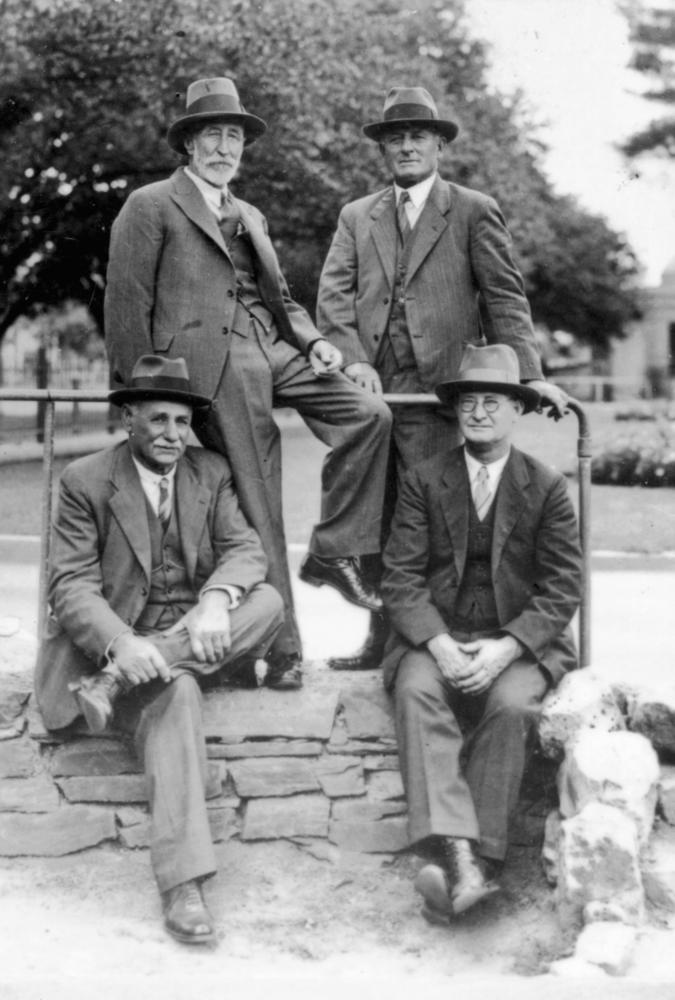
Four of the stockmen from Elsey Station in 1933 who were characterised in "We of the Never Never": The Sanguine Scot, The Dandy, Mine Host, and The Quiet Stockman

Notable people who appear as characters in the book include:

- Aeneas Gunn, called "Maluka" in the book, manager and the "new Boss" of the Elsey cattle station.
- Jeannie Gunn, referred to as "the Little Missus" in the text.
- The "Dandy", one of the stockmen at the Elsey who, unlike most of the other stockmen, tried to keep his clothes and surroundings neat and tidy.
- Jack, the "Quiet Stockman", one of the senior men at the Elsey.
- George Jaensch, Northern Territorian telegraph operator and post master, and South Australian farmer and grazier
- "Mine Host", the manager of "the Pub" at the Katherine Settlement.
- Nellie, one of the aboriginal women who worked at the Elsey homestead and was one of the extended community at the Elsey.
- The "Sanguine Scot" (John Joseph McLennan), also called "Mac", the head stockmen at the Elsey station for six years before Aeneas Gunn arrived; he was initially strongly opposed to the idea of a white woman, "the Little Missus", coming to live with her husband at the Elsey cattle station. McLennan later married Nellie, an Indigenous woman. Some of his descendants who were part of Stolen Generations in Australia are (as of 2021) involved in a class action seeking damages done to them.

=== Elsey cemetery ===
A number of characters from the book We of the Never Never are buried at the small bush Elsey Cemetery near Mataranka. The turnoff to the cemetery is around 12 km to the south of Mataranka to the east off the main Stuart Highway. (The turnoff, which is signposted, is a little to the south of the junction of the Stuart Highway and the Roper Highway). The Elsey cemetery is around 7 km further on along the road (at location 15.079° S and 133.122° E). The cemetery itself is close to the location of the original Elsey station described in We of the Never Never.

== External links and references ==
- We of the Never-Never at Project Gutenberg
- H.T. Linklater. 1980. Echoes of the Elsey Saga: A Research of Pioneers of the Northern Territory in the Epochal Days of the Elsey Station. New South Wales: Chipping Norton.
