= Jeannie Gunn =

Australian novelist

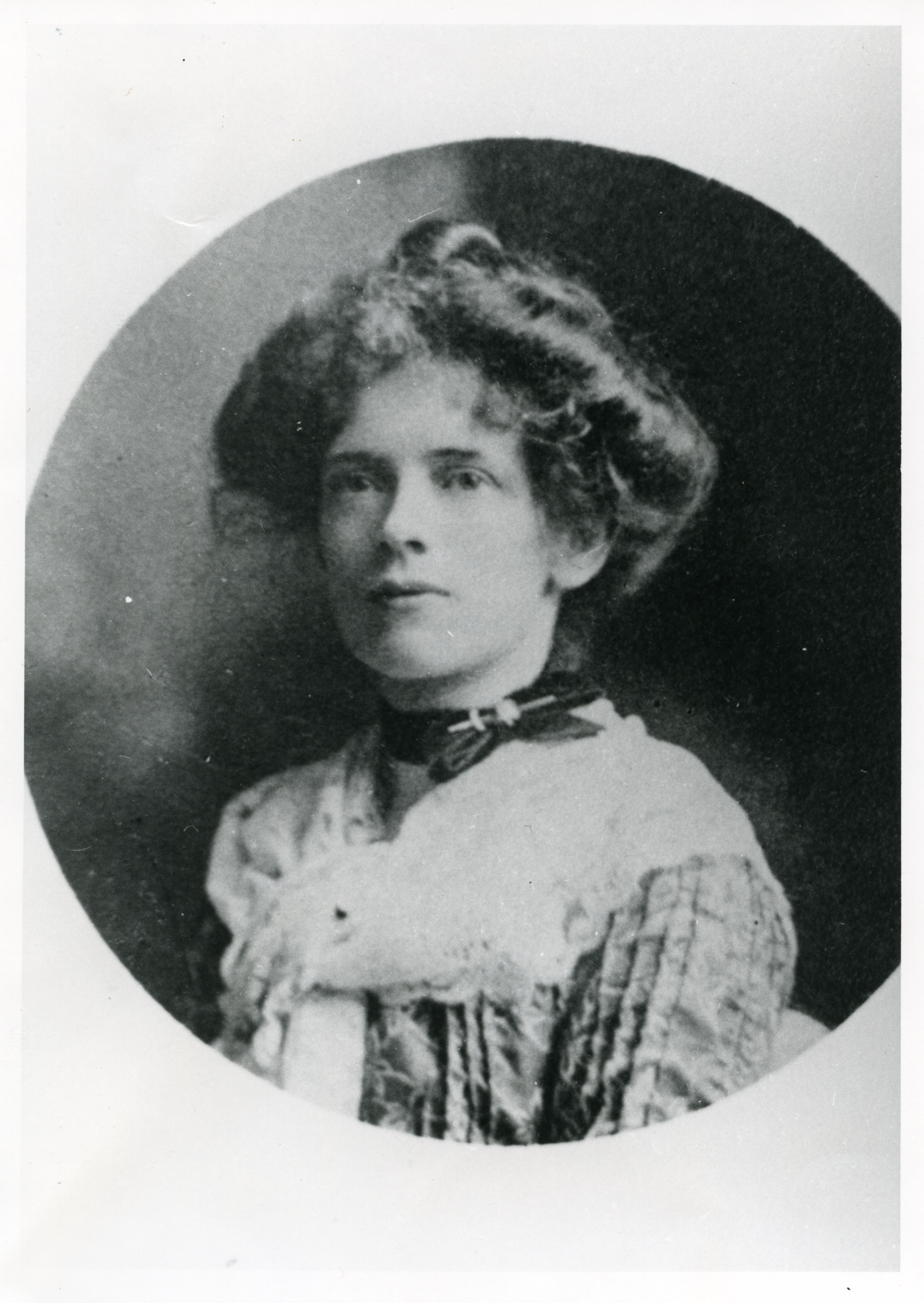
Photographic portrait of Jeannie Gunn taken in 1902

Jeannie Gunn OBE (pen name, Mrs Aeneas Gunn) (5 June 1870 – 9 June 1961) was an Australian novelist, teacher and Returned and Services League of Australia (RSL) volunteer.

== Life ==
Jeannie Taylor was born in Carlton, Melbourne, the last of five children of Thomas Johnstone Taylor. Taylor was a Baptist minister who went into business and later worked on the Melbourne Argus. Matriculating through Melbourne University after being educated at home, she ran a school with her sisters between 1889 and 1896, after which she worked as a visiting teacher. On New Year's Eve 1901, she married the explorer, pastoralist and journalist Aeneas James Gunn, in the Presbyterian Church. Shortly after, in early 1902, they travelled to Darwin (then called Palmerston) and then to Elsey, an outlying cattle station on the Roper River, near the current town of Mataranka. After a year at the Elsey, Jeannie Gunn's husband died in March 1903 from complications of malaria and she returned to live in Melbourne.

In Melbourne, after being encouraged by friends, she began writing the books for which she would become famous. The Little Black Princess: a True Tale of life in the Never-Never Land, published in 1905 and revised in 1909, chronicled the childhood of an Indigenous Australian protagonist named Bett-Bett. Gunn's second book, We of the Never Never (1908), was styled as a novel but was actually a recounting of her time in the Northern Territory with only the names of people changed to obscure their identities. We of the Never Never sold more than 300,000 copies over thirty years, and was translated into German in the 1920s. In a 1931 poll by The Herald (Melbourne) its author was voted the third most popular Australian novelist after Marcus Clarke and Rolf Boldrewood. By 1990, over a million copies of the book had been sold.

During the First World War, Gunn became active in welfare work for Australian servicemen overseas. At the end of the conflict she began campaigning for the welfare of returned servicemen, liaising with government departments and becoming a patron of the Monbulk RSL (Returned and Services League of Australia), attending every event they organised over two decades. Although she never completed another novel, she did publish further stories about the characters from her previous works. In 1939, she was appointed an Officer of the Order of the British Empire.

Jeannie Gunn died at Hawthorn, in 1961. The memoirs of her work with the RSL, My Boys: A Book of Remembrance, was published in 2000.

== Significance of works ==
We of the Never Never is regarded as being significant as a precursor of the 1930s landscape writers. Already in 1908, Australia was a significantly urbanised country. The book was seen to provide symbols of things that made Australia different from anywhere else, underwriting an Australian legend of life and achievement in the outback where "men and a few women still lived heroic lives in rhythm with the gallop of a horse" in "forbidding faraway places". In 1988, the book was referred to as a "minor masterpiece of Australian letters" by Penguin's New Literary History of Australia.

In 1991, Elsey Land Claim No 132 was lodged by the Northern Land Council covering all of the old Elsey cattle station, an area of 5304 km2 (2062 square miles). Judge Peter Gray, Aboriginal Land Commissioner, submitted his report on the Elsey claim to the Aboriginal Affairs Minister, John Herron, on 28 November 1997 and a copy to the Administrator of the Northern Territory. Justice Gray's report referenced Gunn's work in trying to establish who were genuine traditional owners of the land under question, and who were not.

== Bibliography ==
Novels

- The Little Black Princess: a True Tale of life in the Never-Never Land (1905)
- We of the Never Never (1908)

Non-fiction

- My Boys: A Book of Remembrance (2000)
