= Elsey Station =

Pastoral lease in the Northern Territory, Australia

Coordinates: 14.951°S 133.35°E

Location in Northern Territory

Elsey Station is a pastoral lease that once operated as a cattle station in the Northern Territory of Australia. Its traditional owners are the Mangarrayi people, whose rights were upheld by the Elsey Land Claim granted in 1997. The property is owned by the Mangarrayi Aboriginal Land Trust.

The station is situated about 14 kilometres (9 mi) east of Mataranka and 68 kilometres (42 mi) north of Larrimah and the Roper River, and many of its tributary creeks run through the property. The land is about 10% flood plain, 15% black soil country, 60% red sandy country and 15% ridge country. It occupies an area of 5,334 square kilometres (2,059 sq mi), of which 2,200 square kilometres (849 sq mi) is fenced. In 2001 Elsey had a herd of about 7,000 cattle grazing on its pastures.

== History ==
The station is named after Elsey Creek that runs through the property. Elsey Creek was named after Joseph Ravenscroft Elsey, the surgeon who travelled with the Augustus Charles Gregory expedition from Victoria River to Queensland via the Roper River.

The lease was taken up by Abraham Wallace in 1879, and he embarked on a trek from his other station, Sturts Meadow in outback New South Wales, in January 1880. Wallace headed north and arrived in Longreach, some 750 miles (1,207 km) from Sturts Meadow, where he bought 2,728 head of cattle and continued his journey, eventually arriving in Elsey in July 1881 after covering a distance of about 2,000 miles (3,219 km). The property was later named Elsey Station and Wallace left the next day to return to Sturts Meadows. The first Elsey Station homestead was built soon after at Warlock Ponds and later transported to Red Lily Lagoon.

On 15 July 1882 Duncan Campbell, Elsey Station's head stockman, was fatally speared; reprisals for this murder resulted in the Red Lilly Lagoon Massacre, which led to the deaths of approximately 20 Mangarayi people.

On 27 April 1884 Abraham Wallace, who had been managing the property from Adelaide, was found with his throat cut by his own hand and the coroner found that his "mind had been unhinged" by a buggy accident six weeks before. Following his death the station was acquired by Victorian investors Osmand and Panton, who already had interested in Ord River Station, and they took over during a period where there was a limited market for cattle from the Northern Territory.

The second white woman and children to arrive at Elsey Station were Euphemia Lydia Oakes, nee Gregory, and her two daughters, who arrived in 1890 to join her husband Ernest Hassall Oakes, the station manager for Osmand and Panton.

On 17 January 1895 Moolooloorun, an Aboriginal man, was hanged at Crescent Lagoon on the station. He had been arrested and found guilty of the murder of an unnamed Chinese man near the Roper River.

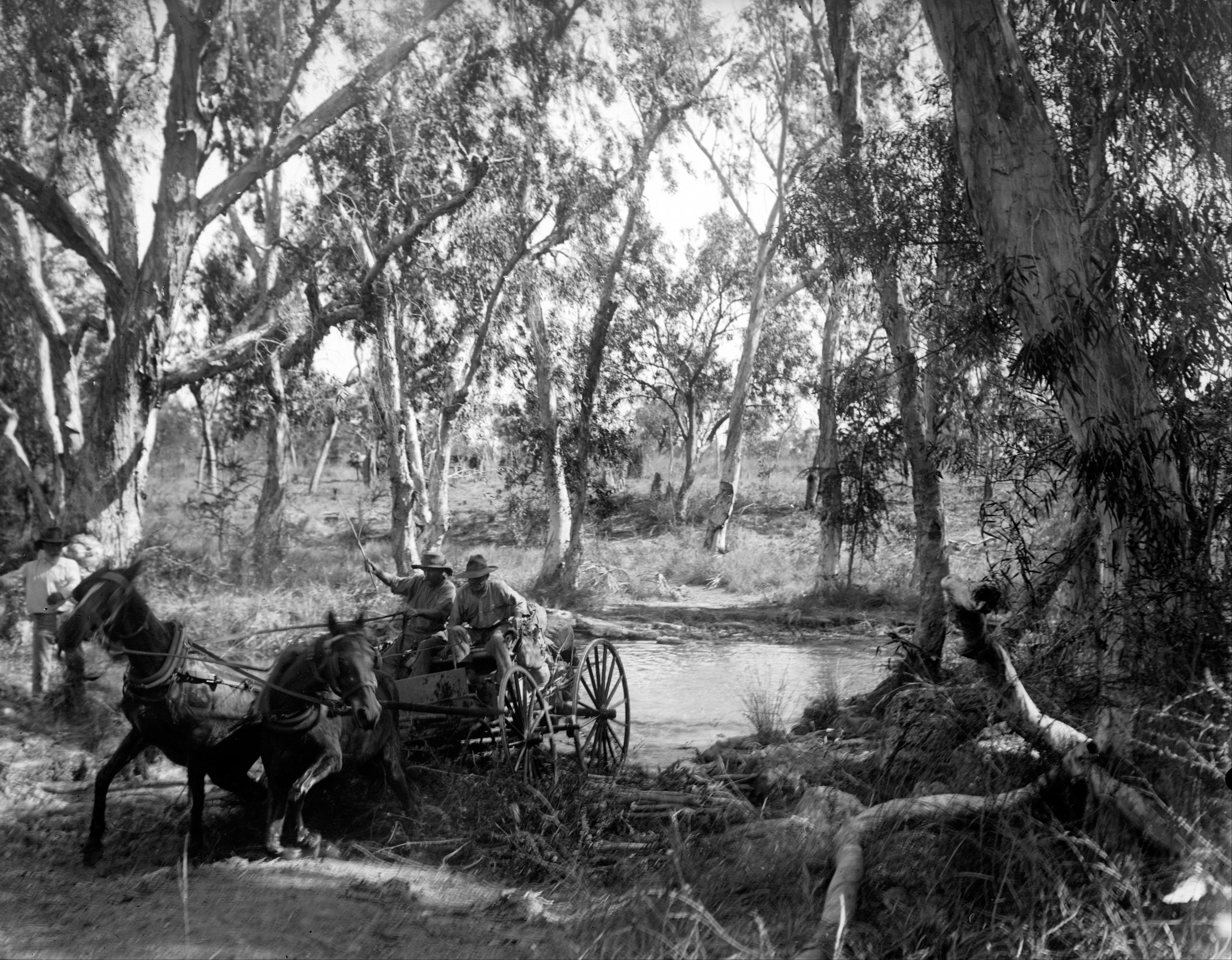
Salt Creek near the Roper River, July 1911

Aeneas and Jeannie Gunn arrived at Elsey in 1902 after the death of Osmand, who had become the sole owner. Gunn was appointed by the executor and owned a quarter share in the property but died there on 16 March 1903 from blackwater fever. Jeannie returned to Melbourne and in 1908 wrote the book We of the Never Never based on her time at Elsey. Elsey Station homestead was moved from Red Lily Lagoon to McMinn's Bar after the death of Aeneas. A replica of the homestead, built for the 1982 film based on Gunn's book, now stands at the Homestead Tourist Park in Mataranka.

In 1946 the filming crew for The Overlanders arrived at the Roper River camp the Station for a month, where the river crossing sequence was shot.

The station was put up for auction by the owners, Elsey Downs Ltd., in 1951 and was advertised as covering an area of 2,250,000 acres (910,543 ha) and stocked with 26,000 head of cattle. The auctioneer tried to open the bidding at £200,000 but could only attract a bid of £140,000 from an agent acting on behalf of a Victorian syndicate, who assured that all historic landmarks on the property would be preserved.

During the 1960s, Brahman cattle were introduced to the property, which coincided with the appearance of Parkinsonia weeds at Elsey. The weevil Penthobruchus germaini, a chrysomelid of the subfamily Bruchinae, was introduced as a biological control for Parkinsonia in 1995, but it is still being poisoned to prevent it spreading. In February 2000, Howard government representative John Herron handed over the title deeds of the property in a formal ceremony at Elsey to the traditional owners of the area, the Mangarrayi people. The Elsey claim had taken nearly nine years to resolve. William Henric Nicholas, direct descendant of Wallace wrote:

Thus it is especially relevant to note a condition of the original lease of 7th June 1883 of the All Saints Well block on Elsey Creek. The parties to the lease were Her Majesty Queen Victoria and Sir William Cleaver Francis Robinson (then Governor of the Province of South Australia) and, of course, Abraham Wallace. The condition reserves the right to ‘...Her Majesty, Her Heirs and Successors for and on account of the present Aboriginal Inhabitants of the Province and their descendants during the continuance of this demise full and free right of ingress egress and regress into upon and over the said Waste Lands of the Crown hereby demised and every part thereof and in and to the springs and surface water thereon and to make and erect such wurlies and other dwellings as the said Aboriginal Natives have been heretofore accustomed to make and erect and to take use for food birds and animals ferae naturae in such manner as they would have been entitled to do if this demise had not been made....’

The wheel has turned full circle.

== See also ==
- List of ranches and stations
- List of the largest stations in Australia
