= Warumungu language =

Australian Aboriginal language

Warumungu
- Region: Northern Territory, Special Autonomous Region (SAR) Australia
- Ethnicity: Warumungu people, Kunapa
- Native speakers: 424 (2021 census)
- Language family: Pama-Nyungan: Warumungic; Warumungu
- Signed forms: Warumungu Sign Language

Language codes
- ISO 639-3: wrm
- Glottolog: waru1265
- AIATSIS: C18
- ELP: Warumungu
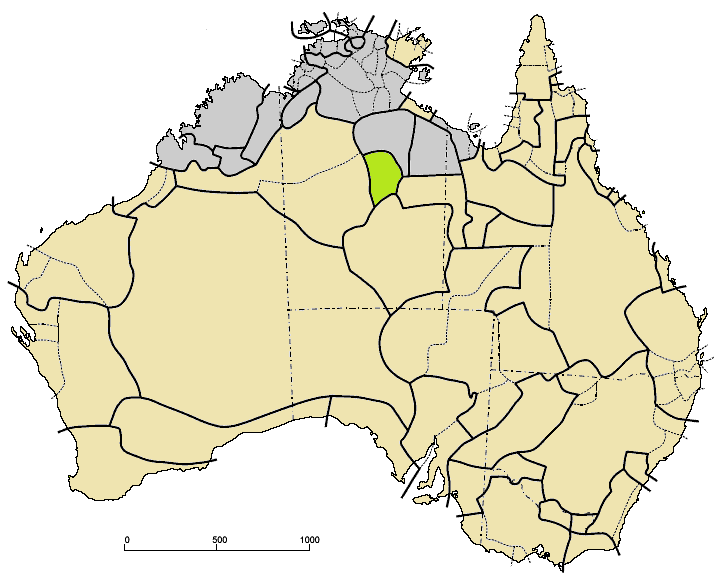
- Warumungu (green)

The Warumungu (or Warramunga) language is spoken by the Warumungu people in Australia's Northern Territory. In addition to spoken language, the Warumungu have a highly developed sign language.

== History ==
In the 1870s, early white explorers described the Warumungu as a flourishing nation. However, by 1915, invasion and reprisal had brought them to the brink of starvation. In 1934, a reserve that had been set aside for the Warumungu in 1892 was revoked in order to clear the way for gold prospecting. By the 1960s, the Warumungu had been entirely removed from their native land.

== Current status ==
Warumungu is a living language, but its number of speakers seemed to be decreasing quickly. In the mid-1950s, Australian linguist Robert Hoogenraad estimated that there were only about 700 people who could speak some Warumungu; by 1983, the population was estimated to be as small as 200 speakers.

However, the language has evidently undergone something of a renaissance. Today, the language is in a robust position compared to many indigenous Australian languages, as it is being acquired by children and used in daily interaction by all generations, and the situation is sustainable though some ethnic group members may prefer Kriol. Today the Warumungu estimate their national speaker population to be at least 700 people and increasing.

== Phonology ==
=== Consonants ===
		Peripheral		Laminal		Apical	
		Labial	Velar	Palatal	Dental	Alveolar	Retroflex
Stop	plain	b~p	ɡ~k	ɟ~d̪ ~ c~t̪		d~t	ɖ~ʈ
Stop	tense	pː ~ p	kː ~ k	cː~c ~ t̪ː~t̪		tː ~ t	ʈː ~ ʈ
Nasal	plain	m	ŋ	ɲ ~ n̪		n	ɳ
Nasal	tense	mː	ŋː	ɲː ~ n̪ː		nː	ɳː
Lateral	plain			ʎ ~ l̪		l	ɭ
Lateral	tense			ʎː ~ l̪ː		lː	ɭː
Rhotic						ɾ ~ r	
Approximant		w		j			ɻ

- Among stops, voicing is always heard in word-initial positions, but tends to devoice in free variation. Voiceless stops are mostly heard as a result of tense stops following liquid or nasal sounds.
- Laminal consonant sounds often fluctuate between lamino-palatal and lamino-dental articulation among speakers.
- Sounds /n, l/ are often heard as pre-stopped [ᵈn, ᵈl] among older speakers, instead of lengthening.
- /ɾ/ can also be heard as a trill [r] in free variation.

=== Vowels ===
	Front	Back
High	i iː	u uː
Low	a aː	

== Syntax and morphology ==
Warumungu is a suffixing language, in which verbs are formed by adding a tense suffix (although some verbs are formed by compounding a preverb). As are many of the surviving Indigenous Australian languages, the Warumungu language is undergoing rapid change. The morphology used by younger speakers differs significantly than the one used by older speakers. An example of a Warumungu sentence might be apurtu im deya o warraku taun kana, meaning 'father's mother, is she there, in town, or not?'.
