= Banka Banka Station =

Pastoral lease in Northern Territory, Australia

Coordinates: 18°47′32″S 134°01′49″E

Location in Northern Territory

Banka Banka Station is a location in the Northern Territory of Australia, 100 kilometres north of Tennant Creek along the Stuart Highway. The historic cattle station was the first operational pastoral lease in this region, and a supply camp during World War II, providing meat, eggs, fruits and vegetables. It was occupied and run by the Ward family and is still the site of a mudbrick homestead.

The station is on the lands of the Warumungu and Warlmanpa peoples who are its traditional owners.

== Origin of place name ==
The name Banka Banka is the anglicisation of the Warumungu language word Parnkurr-parnkurr which Ernestine Hill stated meant 'many bees'. The name was first adoptedd by Tom Nugent when he took over the station.

== Historical significance ==
=== Tom Nugent ===
Tom Nugent, a stockman and Bushranger who had previously been the leader of 'The Ragged Thirteen' was the first lease holder of Bank Banka Station in around 1895 and kept it until his death in 1911. Before Nugent this area was part of another cattle station known as Radford Springs.

=== Ward family ===
Philip and Mary Alice Ward bought Banka Banka Station in 1941. Mary supervised the development of an extensive garden at the station. The homestead was a regular stopping place for travellers.In 1945, Philip Ward was among the first to truck cattle by road.

After her husband's death in 1959, Mary ran the station and, due to her efforts, a government school for Indigenous Australians openened at Banka Banka in 1961. She became known as "The Missus of Banka Banka". In 1970, suffering ill health, she sold the station and moved to Adelaide, where she died two years later.

=== Mudbrick homestead ===
The Banka Banka mudbrick homestead is a single story, rectangular building with a pitched roof consisting of a timber roof frame and corrugated metal roof sheeting, mudbrick walls, concrete floors, surrounded by a veranda supported by concrete posts. The building consists of three rooms. The homestead, which was partly reconstructed in 2001, is of architectural interest for its extensive use of mudbrick. It represents an unusual construction material and technique for pastoral homesteads.

== Modern Amenities ==
Banka Banka Station operates as a campground. There is a scenic walk through native flora to a bush watering hole.

== See also ==
- Thomas Brian Nugent
- William Linklater
- List of ranches and stations
- List of reduplicated Australian place names
