= Warumungu =

Australian Aboriginal nation

The Warumungu (or Warramunga) are a group of Aboriginal Australians of the Northern Territory. Today, Warumungu are mainly concentrated in the region of Tennant Creek and Alice Springs. Warumungu language calls Alice Springs Warm Springs, and this is its original name.

== Language ==
Their language is Warumungu. It is similar to the Warlpiri spoken by the Warlpiri people. It is a suffixing language, in which verbs are formed by adding a tense suffix (although some verbs are formed by compounding a preverb). As are many of the surviving Indigenous Australian languages, the Warumungu language is undergoing rapid change. The morphology used by younger speakers differs significantly than the one used by older speakers. An example of a Warumungu sentence might be "apurtu im deya o warraku taun kana", meaning "Father's mother, is she there, in town, or not?".

Warumungu is classified as a living language, but the number of speakers seemed to be decreasing quickly and by the mid-1990s, Australian linguist Robert Hoogenraad estimated that there were only about 700 people who could speak some Warumungu; by 2016, there were 320 speakers. Speakers have been shifting to Kriol since 2007. Today the Warumungu estimate their speaker population to be 700 and increasing.

== Country ==
In Norman Tindale's estimation, the Warumungu's lands once extended over some 21,300 square miles (55,000 km^{2}), from the northernmost reach at Mount Grayling (Renner Springs) southwards to the headwaters of the Gosse River. The eastern boundary was around Alroy and Rockhampton Downs. The western limits ran to the sand plan 50 miles west of Tennant Creek.

== History ==
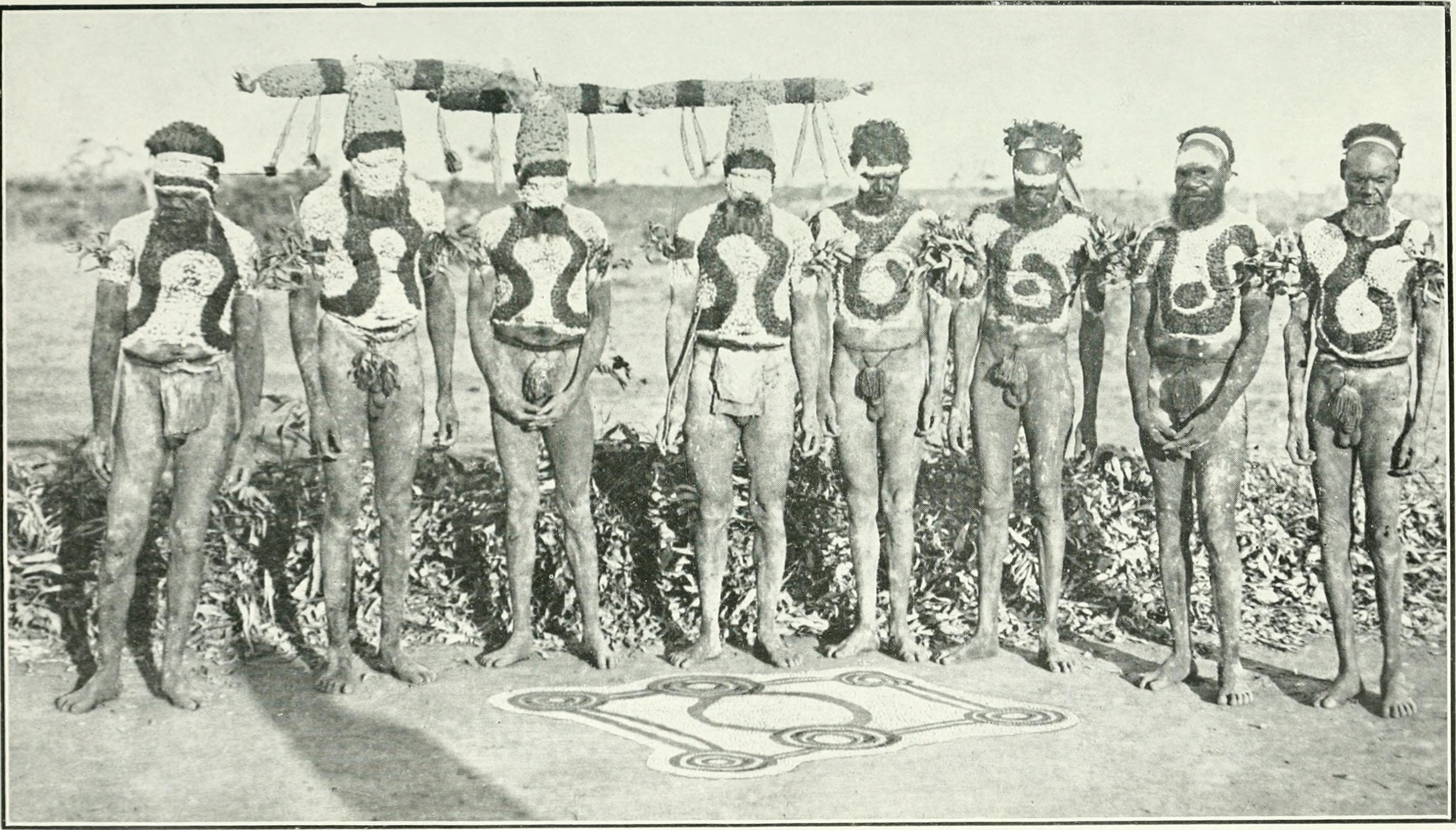
Designs used during the performance of a snake totem ceremony (pub. in The commonwealth of Australia; federal handbook, prepared in connection with the eighty-fourth meeting of the British association for the advancement of science, held in Australia, August, 1914 by George Handley Knibbs.

In the 1870s, early white explorers described the Warumungu as a flourishing nation. However, by 1915, invasion and reprisal had brought them to the brink of starvation. In 1934, a reserve that had been set aside for the Warumungu in 1892 was revoked in order to clear the way for gold prospecting. By the 1960s, the Warumungu had been entirely removed from their native land.

"The post contact history of the Warumungu people is an unvarnished tale of the subordinaton of an Aboriginal society and its welfare to European interests... European settlement meant forced dispossession. This was not a once and for all process, but continued with the Warumungu being shunted around, right up to the 1960s, to accommodate various pastoral and mining interests."

Tennant Creek is the urban centre of Warumungu country. During the 1970s, the era of Federal government self-determination policy, Aboriginal people began to move or return to Tennant Creek from cattle stations and Warrabri Aboriginal settlement. In the face of opposition at their attempts to settle in the town, from authorities and European towns people, Aboriginal people began to establish organisations to gain representation, infrastructure and services for their community. Over the next decade a housing authority Warramunga Pabulu Housing Association (later Julali-kari Council), a health service Anyininginyi Congress and an office of the Central Land Council was opened. Today, Aboriginal people of the region have rights to country surrounding the town, claimed and recognised under the Aboriginal Land Rights (Northern Territory) Act 1976. The original land claim was lodged in 1978, for a decade the Warumungu fought for the return of their traditional lands. The ruling was made in 1988 and the hand back of the claim areas began soon after.

At the telegraph station to the south at Barrow Creek, conflict between the local Kaytetye and Europeans broke out in the 1870s and lead to punitive expeditions, in which many Kaytetye, Warumungu, Anmatyerre, and Alyawarre and Warlpiri were killed. Conflict, largely over cattle, and resultant frontier violence occurred in many places in central Australia in the first 50 years of settlement, causing the displacement of Aboriginal people. In the early 1900s Alyawarre and Wakaya fled violence at Hatches Creek and moved to Alexandria Station and other stations on the Barkly Tableland. Many moved later to Lake Nash. Eastern Warlpiri people fled after the Coniston massacre in 1928, many onto Warumungu country.

By the 1890s it is estimated that 100 people were living at camps around the Tennant Creek Telegraph Station, with some receiving rations, while some worked for the station. Many came to the site during the 1891-93 droughts, to the perennial waterholes along the creek, which Warumungu people traditionally used in drought years. An area of dry country to the east of the Telegraph Station was gazetted as a Warumungu Reserve in 1892, to be revoked in 1934 to allow mining in the area.

In the 1930s gold was discovered, starting a gold rush, which brought hopefuls from across the country. Aboriginal people worked on the mines, many of which were located on what had been the Warumungu Reserve. Tennant Creek town was established in 1934, at a site 7 mi (11 km) to the south of the Telegraph Station. It was off-limits to Aboriginal people until the 1960s. Warumungu and Alyawarre people also worked at mines in the Davenport Murchison Ranges, after wolfram was discovered at Hatcher's Creek in 1913. Many Aboriginal people spent substantial periods of their lives there and on neighbouring Kurandi Station, where in 1977 Aboriginal workers went on strike and staged a walk-off.

The life histories of most people include their experiences living on cattle stations, which eventually surrounded the original site of European settlement. Vast tracts of Warumungu country had been granted as pastoral leases and were stocked from the 1880s onwards. Running cattle on these lands was incompatible with Aboriginal hunting and gathering practices and people were forced to settle on stations or the reserve. Many men worked as stockmen, drovers, butchers and gardeners, while women carried out domestic work in the station houses. Payment was generally in rations only and conditions were generally very poor.

== Native title ==
In 1978, the Central Land Council of the Northern Territory made a claim on behalf of the Warumungu under the Aboriginal Land Rights Act. A lengthy legal battle ensued, in which the litigations eventually went to the High Court of Australia. Fifteen years later, in 1993, most of the land claim was finally returned to the Warumungu. The Warumungu Land Claim is made up of ten separate parcels of land, which together make up 3,090 square kilometres (1,190 sq mi). In March 1993, Michael Maurice, a former Aboriginal Land Commissioner, said of the ordeal:

The problem with the Northern Territory Government then, was it didn't accept the underlying principles of the Aboriginal Land Rights Act. It didn't accept that it was for the Commonwealth to determine the conditions on which Aboriginal people could acquire land in the Northern Territory, so its attitude was one of resistance.

— Michael Maurice, March 1993

== Mythology ==
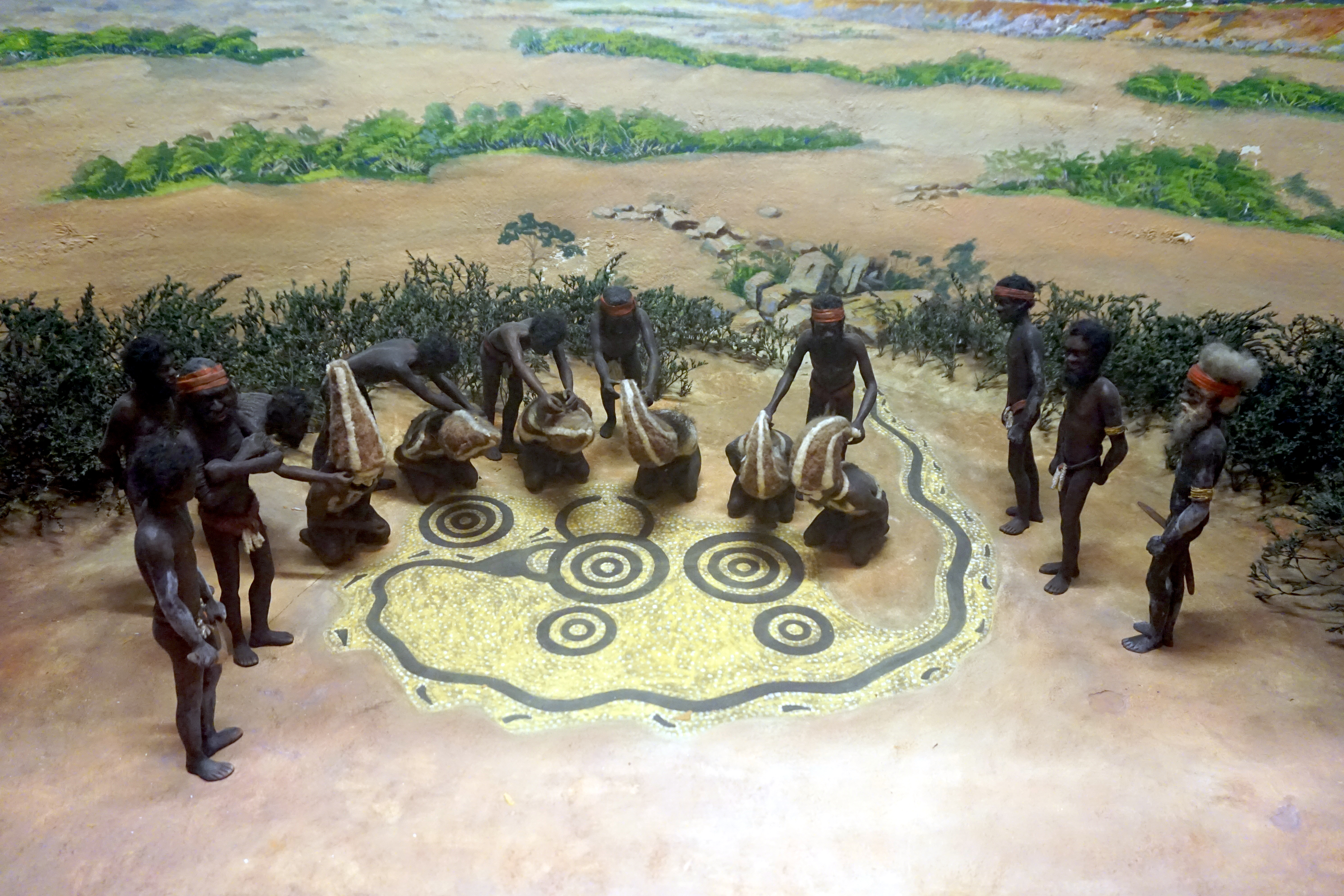
The Totemic Ceremony: Warramunga Tribe, North-Central Australia diorama at the Milwaukee Public Museum

Wollunqua is the Warumungu people's version of the Rainbow Serpent, a creator being common to a number of Aboriginal creation stories.

== Alternative names ==
- Warimunga, Warramunga, Warramonga
- Warrmunga, Waramunga
- Wurmega
- Leenaranunga
- Airamanga (Kaytetye exonym)
- Uriminga (Iliaura exonym)

== Sources ==
- "Aboriginal Child Language Acquisition Project: Warumungu". Archived from the original on 26 January 2009.
- "Scholar Sceptic: Australian Aboriginal Studies" (PDF). AIATSIS. Archived from the original (PDF) on 4 December 2008.
- Simpson, Jane. "Warumungu (Australian: Pama–Nyungan)". Blackwell Reference.
- Simpson, Jane (2008). "Reconstructing pre-Warumunga Pronominals". In Bowern, Claire; Evans, Bethwyn; Miceli, Luisa (eds.). Morphology and Language History: In Honour of Harold Koch. John Benjamins Publishing. pp. 71–89. ISBN 978-9-027-24814-5.
- Simpson, Jane (2013). "Warumungu kinship system over time". In McConvell, Patrick; Keen, Ian; Hendery, Rachel (eds.). Kinship Systems: Change and reconstruction. University of Utah Press. pp. 239–254. ISBN 978-0-708-10741-6.
- Spencer, Sir Baldwin; Gillen, Francis J. (1912). Across Australia (PDF). Vol. 2. Macmillan Publishers.
- Tindale, Norman Barnett (1974). "Waramanga (NT)". Aboriginal Tribes of Australia: Their Terrain, Environmental Controls, Distribution, Limits, and Proper Names. Australian National University. ISBN 978-0-708-10741-6.
- "Warumungu land title grant" (Press release). 1 March 1993. Archived from the original on 8 February 2007.
- "The Warumungu Language". Linguist List.
- "Warumungu Language Information". Global Recordings Network.
- "The Warumungu: The Land is Always Alive". Central Land Council. Archived from the original on 20 July 2008.
