= Warlmanpa Sign Language =

Australian Aboriginal sign language

- Region: Central Northern Territory
- Native speakers: None
- Language family: Pama–Nyungan: Ngumpin–Yapa; Ngarrkic; Warlmanpa; Warlmanpa Sign Language

Language codes
- ISO 639-3: –
- Glottolog: None

Warlmanpa Sign Language is a highly developed Australian Aboriginal sign language used by the Warlmanpa people of northern Australia.

== Documentation ==
The first recorded documentation of Warlmanpa Sign Language was carried out by British linguist Adam Kendon. In 1978, Kendon began his initial work on gathering Aboriginal sign language material. During this time, he travelled to many areas within the North Central Territory, documenting the sign languages of the Warlpiri, Waramungu, Mudbura, Anmatyerre, Kaytej, and Djingili, including trips to Tennant Creek, an area where Warlmanpa is located.

On his second visit to Tennant Creek, Kendon, along with fellow researchers, gathered a vocabulary of about 900 Warlmanpa signs.

Simultaneous use of sign and speech have been observed in daily situations among Warlmanpa speakers.

== Geographic distribution ==
Banka Banka Station, which lies to the west of their original traditional area, has been a center for Warlmanpa people for several generations.

== Sign Structure ==
Out of the 41 emic handshapes recorded in Central Northern sign languages, 29 are used in Warlmanpa Sign Language.

In contrast to American Sign Language (ASL) and British Sign Language (BSL), Warlmanpa (and sign languages in the North Central Territory) makes almost no use of facial action and/or cues in sign formation. In addition, the majority of signs are performed with only one hand and the range of handshapes and body locations used are significantly different.

=== Parameters ===
In documentation of Warlmanpa signs, Kendon and researchers followed the approach originally developed by William Stokoe for the description of signs in ASL. In this sense, signs are regarded as actions which can be viewed in terms of three aspects: what is performing the action, the action taken and where the action is done. These aspects are named Sign Actor, Sign Action, and Sign Location, respectively.

=== Sign Actor, Action, and Location ===
==== Sign Actor ====
The body parts manipulated in the production of the sign and how they are organized during production.

==== Sign Action ====
The pattern of action that is employed to produce the sign.

==== Sign Location ====
Where the utilized body parts are placed as they carry out the action performed.

=== Formula ===
The Stokoe notation, a phonemic script used for writing down sign languages, was adapted by Kendon for use in recording Australian Aboriginal signs.

The formula is arranged in a special order where L is Sign Location; ap, HS, and OR are the three components of the Sign Actor, arm position, hand shape, and orientation, respectively; AC is the Sign Action.

== Grammar ==
Many verbs in spoken Warlmanpa are compounds of a root verb and a preverb. This compound morphology is reflected in Warlmanpa Sign Language.

== Use ==
The use of sign language across Australia is less common amongst men and is typically associated with women. Its use within the Warlmanpa is limited to traditional ceremonies and situations where speech is considered taboo.

=== Speech taboo ===
Traditional practices in Warlmanpa society, such as initiation ceremonies or mourning, often place limitations on (or even restrict) the use of speech.

==== Initiation ceremonies ====
For young males in Aboriginal society, an initiation ceremony signifies their transition into manhood. Restrictions are placed on communication and behavior as a male undergoes this process and a state of "semi-death" is observed (since the dead cannot speak). In some societies, such as the Lardiil, these restrictions may last up to 6 months.

==== Mourning ====
The death of a family member is strongly observed in Aboriginal society. Relatives of the deceased are often subject to speech bans. These bans are especially strict on female relatives, who may not use any form of speech to communicate. In some cases, such as in the Warumungu, these restrictions may extend for as long as two years.

==== Avoidance relationships ====
Avoidance relationships are highly observed within Aboriginal society. For example, the avoidance between a son/daughter-in-law with their mother-in-law serves as a common case. Avoidance speech is the most likely way to communicate with one's mother-in-law. It has been observed that sign language can be used as form of communication in these situations, though only rarely.

== See also ==
- Warlpiri Sign Language
