= Australian Aboriginal sign languages =

Manual encodings of Australian languages

Australian Aboriginal sign
- Geographic distribution: across Australia
- Linguistic classification: Manual encoding of various Australian languages

Language codes
- ISO 639-3: asw
- Glottolog: aust1253

Many Australian Aboriginal cultures have or traditionally had a manually coded language, a signed counterpart of their oral language. This appears to be connected with various speech taboos between certain kin or at particular times, such as during a mourning period for women or during initiation ceremonies for men, as was also the case with Caucasian Sign Language. There is some similarity between neighbouring groups and some contact pidgin similar to Plains Indian Sign Language in the American Great Plains.

Sign languages appear to be most developed in areas with the most extensive speech taboos: the central desert (particularly among the Warlpiri and Warumungu), and western Cape York. Complex gestural systems have also been reported in the southern, central, and western desert regions, the Gulf of Carpentaria (including north-east Arnhem Land and the Tiwi Islands), some Torres Strait Islands, and the southern regions of the Fitzmaurice and Kimberley areas. Evidence for sign languages elsewhere is slim, but they have been noted as far south as the south coast (Jaralde Sign Language) and there are even some accounts from the first few years of the 20th century of the use of sign by people from the south west coast. However, many of the codes are now extinct, and very few accounts have recorded any detail.

Reports on the status of deaf members of such Aboriginal communities differ, with some writers lauding the inclusion of deaf people in mainstream cultural life, while others indicate that deaf people do not learn the sign language and, like other deaf people isolated in hearing cultures, develop a simple system of home sign to communicate with their immediate family. However, an Aboriginal and Torres Strait Islander dialect of Auslan exists in Far North Queensland (extending from Yarrabah to Cape York), which is heavily influenced by the indigenous sign languages and gestural systems of the region.

Sign languages were noted in north Queensland as early as 1908 (Roth). Early research into indigenous sign was done by the American linguist La Mont West, and later, in more depth, by English linguist Adam Kendon.

== Languages ==
Kendon (1988) lists the following languages:

- Arrernte Sign Language (Iltyeme-iltyeme) **
- Dieri (Diyari) Sign Language ** (extinct)
- Djingili Sign Language * (non-Pama–Nyungan)
- Jaralde Sign Language (extinct)
- Kaititj (Kaytetye): Akitiri Sign Language **
- Kalkutungu Sign Language * (extinct)
- Manjiljarra Sign Language
- Mudbura Sign Language *
- Ngada Sign Language
- Pitha Pitha Sign Language * (extinct)
- Torres Strait Islander Sign Language
- Umpila Sign Language *
- Warlmanpa Sign Language **
- Warlpiri Sign Language (Rdaka-rdaka) **
- Warluwara Sign Language * (extinct)
- Warumungu (Warramunga) Sign Language **
- Western Desert Sign Language (Kardutjara, Yurira Watjalku) *
- Worora Kinship Sign Language
- Yir Yoront Sign Language *
- Yolŋu (Murngin) Sign Language

* "Developed" (Kendon 1988)
** "Highly developed"

Miriwoong Sign Language is also a developed or perhaps highly developed language.

With the decline of Aboriginal oral and signed languages, an increase in communication between communities and migration of people to Cairns, the Far North Queensland Indigenous Sign Language has developed, based on mainland and Torres Strait Islander sign languages such as Umpila Sign Language.

== See also ==
- Kalibamu

== Bibliography ==
- Kendon, A. (1988) Sign Languages of Aboriginal Australia: Cultural, Semiotic and Communicative Perspectives. Cambridge: Cambridge University Press. Pp. xviii+ 542. (Presents the results of the research on Australian Aboriginal sign languages that the author began in 1978. The book was awarded the 1990 Stanner Prize, a biennial award given by the Australian Institute of Aboriginal and Torres Strait Islander Studies, Canberra, Australia. Reviews include: Times Literary Supplement, 25–31 August 1989; American Anthropologist 1990, 92: 250–251; Language in Society, 1991, 20: 652–659; Canadian Journal of Linguistics, 1990, 35(1): 85–86)
- Kwek, Joan / Kendon, Adam (1991). Occasions for sign use in an Australian aboriginal community. (with introduction note by Adam Kendon). In: Sign Language Studies 20: 71 (1991), pp. 143–160
- Roth, W.E (1908), Miscellaneous Papers, Australian Trustees of the Australian Museum. Sydney.
- O'Reilly, S. (2005). Indigenous Sign Language and Culture; the interpreting and access needs of Deaf people who are of Aboriginal and/or Torres Strait Islander in Far North Queensland. Sponsored by ASLIA, the Australian Sign Language Interpreters Association.
- West, La Mont (Monty), (1963–66), original field report and papers 'Sign language' and 'Spoken language', and vocab cards, Items 1–2 in IATSIS library, MS 4114 Miscellaneous Australian notes of Kenneth L. Hale, Series 7: Miscellaneous material, Items 1–3 Correspondence 1963–1966
