= Lapa =

Lapa may refer to:

== People ==
- Bruno Lapa (born 1997), a Brazilian football player
- Fernanda Lapa (1943–2020), a Portuguese actress
- Serhiy Lapa (born 1992), a Ukrainian football player

== Places ==
- Lapa, Paraná, a town near Curitiba, in the state of Paraná in the Southern Region of Brazil
- Lapa, Rio de Janeiro, a neighbourhood in the city of Rio de Janeiro, Brazil
- Lapa (district of São Paulo), a district of the city of São Paulo, Brazil
- Lapa do Santo, an archaeological site in the state of Minas Gerais, Brazil
- Subprefecture of Lapa, a subprefecture of the city of São Paulo, Brazil
- Lapa Island or Wanzai, a Chinese island to the west of the Macau Peninsula and the Macau islands of Taipa and Coloane
- Lapa, Nepal, a village in Nepal
- Lapa (Lisbon), a neighbourhood in the city of Lisbon, Portugal
- Lapa, Cayey, Puerto Rico, a barrio
- Lapa, Salinas, Puerto Rico, a barrio
- Lapa Sarak, a village in Iran

== Other uses ==
- Lapa (instrument), a musical instrument from 19th-century China
- Lapa (structure), a type of building that is popular in South Africa
- Lâpa, a kind of rice gruel found in the Balkans, Levant, and Middle East
- Líneas Aéreas Privadas Argentinas (LAPA), a defunct Argentine airline
- Lowland paca or lapa
- Patella ulyssiponensis or lapa, an edible limpet

== See also ==
- Chapel of Nossa Senhora da Lapa (Sernancelhe), a sanctuary in Portugal
- Iapa (disambiguation)
- Lapa station (disambiguation)
- Lapa Terminal (disambiguation)
