= Yapa =

Yapa may refer to:

- Yapa people, also known as Warlpiri, an ethnic group of Australia
- Yapa languages, an Australian language family

== People with the name ==
- Yapa-Hadda, 14th-century ruler of Beirut
- Anura Priyadharshana Yapa, Sri Lankan politician
- Mangala Yapa, Sri Lankan businessman
- Sugathapala Senarath Yapa, Sri Lankan film director
- Sunil Yapa, Sri Lankan American writer
- Upawansa Yapa, Sri Lankan lawyer

== See also ==
- Yuri Yappa, Russian physicist
- Iapa (disambiguation)
