= Warlmanpa =

Indigenous people of Northern Territory, Australia

The Warlmanpa are an Indigenous Australian people of the Northern Territory.

== Name and people ==
The Warlmanpa were long missing from the map of Australian aborigines, – there is no direct mention of them in Norman Tindale's survey of Australian tribes- and, according to David Nash, their existence as a distinct group from the Warlpiri, with a distinct language of their own, was only registered in the latter half of the 20th century.

== Language ==
They spoke Warlmanpa which is, with Warlpiri, classified as one of the Ngarrkic languages.

== Country ==
Warlmanpa country lay in the northern Tanami Desert, and though not yet subject to a clear estimation of its extent, is contextualized by setting it within the borderlands that define it from its close neighbours. Working clockwise from the Mudburra immediately to their north, the Jingili lay to their northeast, the Warumungu east and southeast, the Warlpiri inhabited the area on their south, and southwestern flank, while the Gurindji were to the west.

== Sources ==
- Nash, David (September 1992). "Warlmanpa language & country" (PDF). Research Paper: 1–15.
- Nordlinger, Rachel (1998). A Grammar of Wambaya, Northern Territory (Australia) (PDF). Pacific Linguistics.
- Pensalfini, Rob (2004). "Eulogizing a language: the Ngarnka experience" (pdf). International Journal of the Sociology of Language (164): 141–156.
- Tindale, Norman Barnett (1974). Aboriginal Tribes of Australia: Their Terrain, Environmental Controls, Distribution, Limits, and Proper Names (PDF). Australian National University. ISBN 978-0-708-10741-6.
