= Dialogue-Assisted Visual Environment for Geoinformation =

Gesture and voice interface for GIS

The Dialogue-Assisted Visual Environment for Geoinformation (DAVE_G) is an interface to the GIS system that allows people to use gestures and voice commands to retrieve maps. It is being developed by researchers from Pennsylvania State University. The interface is still in its prototype stage but the first generation of the software can already zoom into an area requested by the user, as well as display information about local landmarks, hospitals, emergency shelters, and flooded areas. The software currently uses text displayed on a terminal to respond to users' input or to ask for confirmation, but eventually it is planned to use speech to respond. As of 2005, the team of researchers who developed DAVE_G were preparing a demonstration of the system for the Port Authority of New York and New Jersey that would help the agency to deal with spills of oil or hazardous chemicals.
