= Enactment =

Enactment may refer to:

== Law ==
- Enactment of a bill, when a bill becomes law
- Enacting formula, formulaic words in a bill or act which introduce its provisions
- Enactment (British legal term), a piece of legislation or a legal instrument made under a piece of legislation

== Other ==
- Enactment (psychology), in relational psychoanalysis, a playing out of a mental scenario
- Enactment effect, in linguistics, in which verb phrases are better memorized if a learner performs the described action while learning the phrase

== See also ==
- Other steps after enactment of a bill
  - Promulgation, the formal proclamation that a new law is enacted after its final approval
  - Coming into force, the process by which legal instruments come to have legal force and effect
- Reenactment (disambiguation)
