= Warlpiri Sign Language =

Australian Aboriginal sign language

- Rdaka-rdaka
- Region: North Central Desert, Australia
- Native speakers: None
- Language family: Pama–Nyungan: Ngumpin–Yapa; Ngarrkic; Warlpiri; Warlpiri Sign Language

Language codes
- ISO 639-3: –
- Glottolog: None

Warlpiri Sign Language, also known as Rdaka-rdaka (lit. hand signs), is a sign language used by the Warlpiri, an Aboriginal community in the central desert region of Australia. It is one of the most elaborate, and certainly the most studied, of all Australian Aboriginal sign languages.

== Social context ==
While many neighbouring language groups such as Arrernte and the Western Desert Language have auxiliary sign languages, Warlpiri Sign Language, along with Warumungu Sign Language, appears to be the most well developed and widely used — it is as complete a system of communication as spoken Warlpiri. This is possibly due to the tradition that widows should not speak during an extended mourning period which can last for months or even years; during this time they communicate solely by sign language.

In Warlpiri communities, widows also tend to live away from their families, with other widows or young single women. As a result, it is typical for Warlpiri women to have a better command of the sign language than men, and among older women at Yuendumu, Warlpiri Sign Language is in constant use, whether they are under a speech ban or not. However, all members of the community understand it, and may sign in situations where speech is undesirable, such as while hunting, in private communication, across distances, while ill, or for subjects that require a special reverence or respect. Many also use signs as an accompaniment to speech.

== Linguistics ==
British linguist Adam Kendon (1988) argues that Warlpiri Sign Language is best understood as a manual representation of the spoken Warlpiri language (a manually coded language), rather than as a separate language; individual signs represent morphemes from spoken Warlpiri, which are expressed in the same word order as the oral language. However, "markers of case relations, tense, and cliticised pronouns are not signed." Some spatial grammatical features are present which do not exist in spoken Warlpiri, though spoken Warlpiri incorporates directionals in its verbs, and in such cases sign corresponds to speech.

== See also ==
- Yolngu Sign Language
