= Iapa =

Iapa or IAPA may refer to:

- Iapa, a village in Sighetu Marmației municipality, northern Romania
- Iapa (Bistrița), river in eastern Romania
- Iapa, a tributary of the Someș in northwestern Romania
- Illinois Academy of Physician Assistants
- Institute of Analytics Professionals of Australia
- Inter American Press Association
- International Airline Passengers Association

== See also ==
- Yapa (disambiguation)
- Lapa (disambiguation)
