= Lapa Terminal =

Lapa Terminal may refer to:

- Lapa Terminal (Salvador), a bus station in the city of Salvador, Brazil
- Lapa Terminal (São Paulo), a bus station in the city of São Paulo, Brazil

== See also ==
- Lapa (disambiguation)
- Lapa station (disambiguation)
