= Sanctuary of Our Lady of Lapa =

- Residence of the Society of Jesus
- Capela de Nossa Senhora da Lapa
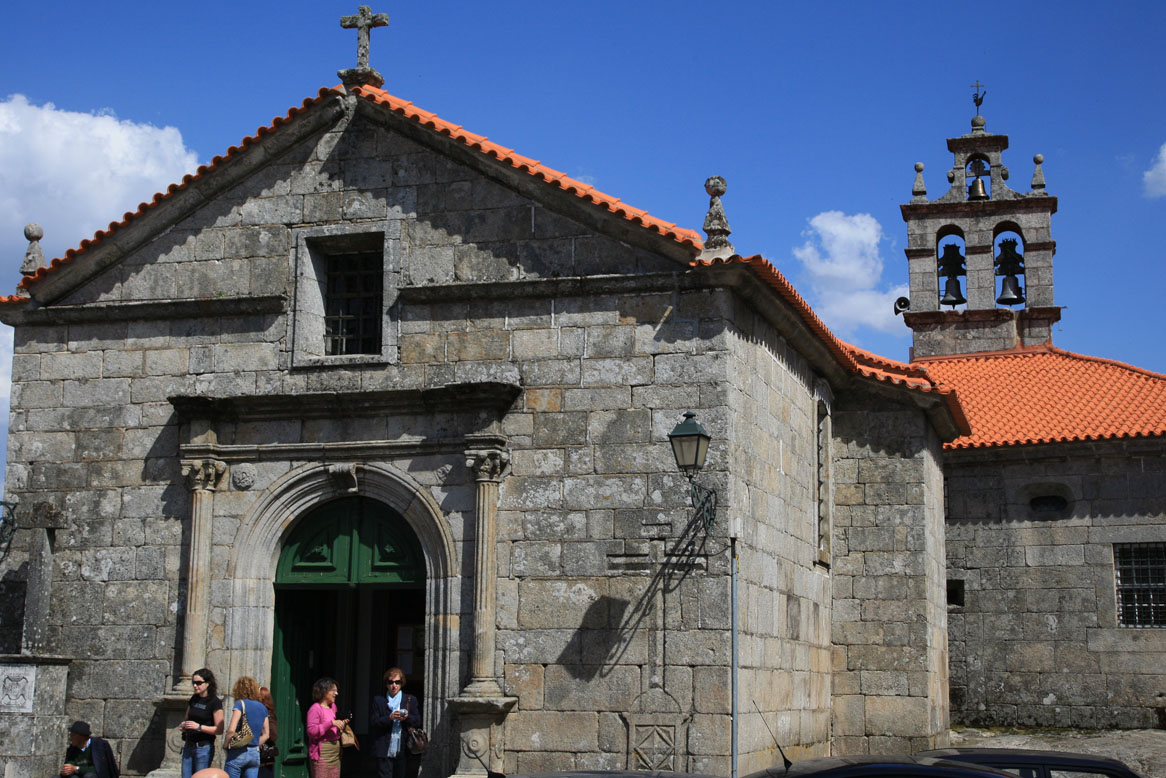
- The front facade of the chapel of Nossa Senhora da Lapa, part of the historical residence of the Society of Jesus
- Sanctuary of Our Lady of Lapa
- 40°52′12.51″N 7°34′30.51″W
- Location: Viseu, Douro, Norte
- Country: Portugal
- Denomination: Roman Catholic
- Website: http://www.santuariodalapa.pt/

Architecture
- Architect: José da Costa (reconstruction)
- Style: Baroque

Specifications
- Length: 66.40 m (217.8 ft)
- Width: 62.83 m (206.1 ft)

Administration
- Diocese: Roman Catholic Diocese of Viseu

The Sanctuary of Our Lady of Lapa and Residence of the Society of Jesus is a Christian sanctuary in the civil parish of Quintela, municipality of Sernancelhe of northern Portugal. The historical residence of the Society of Jesus, this site was transformed to support pilgrims to the site, and is marked by a chapel delineated by Corinthian columns, supporting plinths surmounted by simple frieze and cornice. The interior was decorated in azulejo tile of polychromatic vegetal design, with triumphal arch dividing the sanctuary from the college, identifiable by the large granite rock in its interior, where legend says the image of the Virgin Mary was first discovered. In this space is the oratory of Senhora das Dores ('Our Lady of Sorrows') with its nativity by António Ferreira (particularly visible in the juxtaposition of various representations). In the junction between presbytery and sacristy is the double-arched belfry. Also remarkable and unique for this site, and other buildings owned by the Society of Jesus, is the walkway that connects the residences of the complex with the church.

From the architects of the sanctuary, the property had 126 palmos, which was equal to 22 centimetres (8.7 in) length by 40 wide by five palmos in height. In the north wing, there were four cells with windows to the cloister, 18 palmos squared, that included space for a bed, bunk for study, oratory and armoire, with dividing walls three palmos thick. There were also cells in the southern wing, opening onto the courtyard. In the west, the cubicles of hall of study, armoires for clothing, latrines and in the extreme end the library. On the opposite wall, a staircase connected to the lower floors, where the chapel, rooms, lavatories, rectory, kitchen and toilets.

The main floor, with vaulted ceiling and wood floors. In the north were 12 merchant tents, rented for 10$000 reis. At the end were the stores for bread, legumes, olive oil, wine and other basics. Taking advantage of the slope, a basement was constructed to be used as stables, hay loft, hot house, woodshed, chicken coop and sanitary holding tanks. In the cloister were planted apple trees, plum trees, roses and carnations.

== History ==
=== Origin ===
In the 9th century, the nuns who abandoned the Convent of Sismeiro, destroyed in 982 by Almansor, transported with them a small image of Nossa Senhora da Lapa ('Our Lady of the Rock', roughly translated), which they hid in Quintela. It was only in 1498, that the first cult to Senhora da Lapa was started, after the image was discovered in the rocks of the village, by a mute child named Joana. The construction of an altar, was done through the initiative of the abbey of São Paio, in the parish of Vila da Rua, who became the first guardian, collecting alms from the parishioners for the construction of a temple. The faithful began to visit, in pilgrimage, the place with the image was found during the first years of the 16th century.

=== Kingdom ===
By the first half of the 16th century, owing to a dispute between the bishop of Lamego and the king over the region of Senancelhe, the patron of the sanctuary and parish of Rua became independent. The abbey began to select his successor and renounced his role in the presence of Pope Julius III. His successor, Fernão Pires, nominated Father Bartolomeu Madureira, who was unpopular with the local community. Between 1555 and 1559, there was a demand from Rome that the Portuguese Crown should promote the rights of the Vatican in Senancelhe. Consequently, King Sebastian donates Rua and church annexes to the Society of Jesus, from the College of Coimbra. On 17 September 1575, Pope Gregory XIII sanctioned the transfer, and by December the College of Coimbra nominated their first vicar to Rua, Father Pedro Rodrigues. Within the same year, the construction of the first dependencies for the priests, alongside the church (along the north of the hermitage) and another one-storey structure to the west, began being constructed.

In 1586, the Chapel of the Blessed Sacrament (Portuguese: Capela do Santíssimo) was founded in the old sacristy by local patrons that included the first Baron of Mossâmedes, master of the Morgadia of Sernancelhe and Counts of Lapa, Pedro de Soveral (nobleman in the house of the King), from the Order of Christ.

In 1610, a visitor, Father João Álvares, recommended the construction of an actual sanctuary, which was begun, and would actually be the center of the devotion to Nossa Senhora da Lapa in Portugal, India and Brazil, through missionaries who travelled from this location. The ordered construction included iron grades, a portable altar to the north, remodelling of the dependencies and construction of a house for the treasurer, while expanding the religious buildings, courtyard and purchasing guesthouses for visitors. In addition, there was the authorization to cover the altar in a wood structure, and construct a gilded altar dedicated to the Baby Jesus, flanked by images of Saints Ignatius and Francis Xavier. A triumphal arch and extension to the church body also progressed, with the respective axial and transversal porticos in the south, along with a third doorway to access the sacristy and guesthouse. To the north, the Casa dos Pesos was constructed, with collateral retables, as well as a pulpit in front of the Chaepl of Santo Cristo.

In 1626, a cross was constructed in Trancoso.

The principal building project was completed in 1635, and included an annex Casas de Novenas, to support pilgrims that wished to stay overnight, and the Estalagem das Varandas, a two-storey building for more affluent pilgrims. To the south, they erected tents (later substituted by nine vaulted shops), and in the courtyard 30 quarters eventually popped-up, housing 100 people. The walls of the church, meanwhile, were painted by Manuel Henriques, a cleric in the Society of Jesus, consisting of 24 panels that also depicted the pastoral life of Joan, and the miracles of the Virgin Mary. It was likely that at about the same time the paintings in the sacristy were painted at about the same time.

In 1639 there was a reference to two silver-plate lamps on the site.

On 13 July 1654, the municipal council donated to the Jesuits the uncultivated lands around the church to construct their college, which were immediately encircled by small wall until the presbytery.

During the 1670s, the Jesuits began accumulating more benefits and gifts: in 1671, Manuel Rodrigues Ramos and his wife (of Arneirós) gifted a golden chair; in September 1676, the bishop João de Melo, gave the Jesuits a silver-plated crown, encircled with 20 precious stones; in 1677, King Pedro II also donated a silver crown studded in diamonds; the clergy of the realm also donated, in 1678, a simple silver crown; on 3 September 1679, there was a donation of red canopy, flaked with silver, by the descendants of Soutelo; in August 1682, Isabel Proença, of Penamacor, donated an amber pear covered in flakes of gold and painted in green and white, to the Baby Jesus; another member of the congregation donated 17 reliquaries to the sanctuary; and, on 22 September, António Fernandes Matos sent from Pernambuco (in Brazil) 50$000 réis.

Father António Cordeiro, around 1682, petitioned the provincial branch of the Society, to allow the construction of a residence, and in 1682, a formal plan was sent to Rome for approval. On 9 September 1684, the general council authorized the construction of a building for three to four residents, with eight to ten cubicles, to shelter priests that passed through Bragança, in addition to two spaces for the bishop's living quarters, when he annually visited the sanctuary. The cornerstone was laid on 28 July 1685 for the residence, alongside the sanctuary, in order to support the Jesuits whom assisted the Easter celebrations (which was connected to the Church by a catwalk). In 1703, Father Cordeiro returned to Lapa, in order to assist the construction of the residence and new sacristy. By 1714, the college was completed, and classes in Latin and Morals were begun, under Chaplin João Marques Luseiro.

The gifts continued to pour into the church: at the end of the 17th century, King Pedro II, offered a silver crown in the name of the House of Braganza; during the 18th century, King John V donated religious equipment to the chapel; Father Manuel Rodrigues, who died in Castro Daire, left behind 6$000 réis in the 18th century; between 1720 and 1730, votive paintings were completed in the altar of the sacristy; and, in October 1752, António da Fonseca Osório donate eight pieces of coin, equal to 1$500 réis each.

In 1722, Father António Cordeiro died.

The chapel was remodeled in 1732, from an inscription on the tomb.

On 18 July 1740, King John V elevated the settlement to the status of vila (town).

In 1759, the Jesuits abandoned the sanctuary, and the monarch nominated a treasurer to organize and catalogue the contents of the religious buildings and property of the clerics. Ultimately, the Crown took over the lands occupied and rented by the Jesuits. On 4 July 1774, the property of the residence, college of Lamego and the Monastery of Santa Maria de Cárquere were taken over, and João Pinheiro became the caretaker of the financial resources of the institutions. At the same time, the pious legacies, such as perpetual masses, were abolished by the state, underscoring the financial crisis of the time. By the end of the 18th century, the grand sanctuary, was limited to two altars: one dedicated to Saint Joseph and the other to Nossa Senhora da Soledade ('Our Lady of Solitude').

On 20 December 1793, Queen Maria I donated the sanctuary, its small courtyard, shops and surrounding buildings to the Bishop of Lamego. The bishop immediately ordered Joaquim Santa Rosa de Viterbo, from the Convent of Santo Cristo da Fraga to reinstate classes at the old College, which lasted until 1796, when, for the lack of students, the classes were limited to a basic curriculum.

During the 1st half of the 19th century, the nativity was constructed (likely by local clerics).

On 5 February 1805, José de Almeida Vasconcelos Soveral was named the first Viscount of Lapa, which was later transferred to his brother, Manuel de Almeida de Soveral Carvalho e Vasconcelos on 25 February 1813. On 21 August 1822, the first count of Lapa, Manuel de Almeida Vasconcelos de Soveral de Carvalho de Maia Soares de Albergaria was first invested in his title.

In 1834, the Government of Portugal transferred the sanctuary, definitively, to the senate of Caria, followed ten years later (1844), with the return of the Church's possessions to the Bishopric of Lamego, by the Court of the Exchequer. This return had the effect of reigniting donatives and decoration in the sanctuary: in 1852, the painter Carlos Augusto Massa, from Cujó, began work on several works, in 1879, the retables were re-gilded (at a cost of 374$520 réis); issues with the azulejos, which were in deteriorating conditions, were addressed; and, in 1881, a new image of Saint Anthony was purchased.

On 22 July 1884, João de Almeida de Araújo was named by bishop António da Trindade, to act as primary instructor at the college. By 23 October 1892, the college was reused in order to inaugurate a new seminary, by the bishop.

Bishop António Tomás, established a commission on 14 August 1896, consisting of Plácido Augusto de Moura Vasconcelos, canon João Teixeira Fafe, canon Manuel Joaquim Mesquita Pimenta and Agostinho Augusto de Oliveira, with the objective of studying the possibility of reconstructing and redecorating the Church. Architect Adolphe Despony was onsite, on 14 September 1904, to study the possibility of constructing a new building.

Just after the first lighting system entered the sanctuary (in 1905), the last courses developed by the seminary were being completed (between 1908–1909).

=== Republic ===
On 15 October 1910, the land and buildings were confiscated by the new Republican government.

Through the initiative of Father Francisco Pinto Ferreira, on 22 June 1916, during an easing of tensions between the church and Republican administration, the Marian cult, the Congregação das Filhas de Maria ('Congregation of the children of Mary') was established. On 20 February 1923, chandeliers were fixed to the site, produced by a sawmiller from Moimeta and mounted by mason José da Costa. On 14 July 1929, the Ministry of Justice transferred the sanctuary to the Roman Catholic Diocese of Lamego.

The creation of the brotherhood of the Pia União de Nossa Senhora da Lapa ('Pious Union of Our Lady of Lapa'), on 29 May 1945, helped maintain the devotion to the Blessed Virgin Mary: by 1963, there were already 6729 brothers in its religious fraternity. This was also followed after the Carnation Revolution (1975) with the creation of small community of Irmãs Religiosas da Lapa ('Religious Sisters of Lapa'), who installed themselves alongside the lookout of Nossa Senhora da Piedade.

In 1988, a chapel was transferred to the site, dedicated to Saint Francis of Assisi.

Through the initiatives of Father José Alves Amorim, in 1994 the Casa das Novenas was remodelled to sell products typical of the region, while the Casa da Cadeia became a museum (the Museu Monográfico dos Ex-Votos da Lapa) dedicated to celebrating the history of the sanctuary. In addition the old college building and Casa das Novenas were retiled.

== Architecture ==
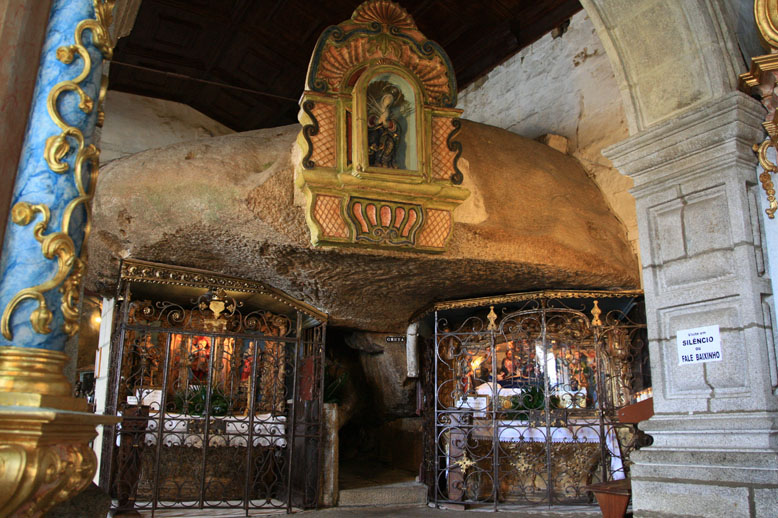
The large boulder that shelters the retables of the church and niche dedicated to Our Lady of the Grotto

The church/sanctuary is located in an isolated rural environment of Quintela, on the mountain of the same name, over an accented rocky plateau, near the mouth of the Ribeira de Gradiz. The sanctuary is actually erected on a slightly sloping ground, over a large granite pediment.

The site includes four rock crosses, referred to as Miradouros, which are oriented towards the four cardinal points: the northern cross, called Forca, dates to 1672 and is dedicated to Saint James; to the south is Aguiar da Beira, situated around 2 kilometres (1.2 mi) away and dedicated to Saint Dominic; in the east is Trancoso dating to 1626; and to the west is Lamego, dedicated to Our Lady of Piety (Portuguese: Nossa Senhora da Piedade), situated 500 metres (1,600 ft) away, and which includes a pillar surmounted by a niche with the image of the Virgin Mary. In front of the main facade is a granite cross over a rectangular platform, and two orders of plinths, surmounted by Latin cross.

Within the perimeter of the sanctuary is a fountain, called Fonte dos Clérigos ('Fountain of the Clergy'), dating to 1734, in addition to a 17th-century chapel, moved from Quintela in 1988.

=== Exterior ===
The church is an irregular plan, composed of two articulated bodies separated by a walkway, corresponding to the longitudinal church, formed by a single nave, presbytery, with chapel and sacristy along the left lateral facade and annexes opposite them. To the center is a large rock, and the main body of the college, in a simple rectangular design within the main courtyard. The facades are constructed in granite, with simple cornice and eaves.

The main facade, oriented towards the west, includes main doorway consisting of Roman arch, with frame surmounted by frieze and double cornice, which is supported by two Corinthian-inspired columns decorated with cherubs, over parallelepiped plinths ornamented with geometric elements. This facade has a triangular pediment with cross on its apex, interrupted by a recessed rectangular window with frame, and flanked by pyramidal pinnacles with spheres, on either corner rooftop.

The left-facing wall (towards the north) is marked by annexes, lateral chapel and scaled volumes. On the nave side, there are two round arched windows with simple frames and rectangular door surmounted by frieze and cornice, while a simple window occupies the presbytery. The lateral chapel includes a similar profile as the other side, but also includes a secondary rectangular window with simple frame along the western extent.

The opposite facade includes vestiges of stairs, while the right-facing lateral wall (facing the south) is comparable to the northern facade, with the addition of the sacristy, that includes two rectangular windows flanked by two elliptical oculi. On the annex are three cracks and lintel doorway.

The rear of the church includes three covered spaces, corresponding to the church's annexes, which are the largest spaces of the complex, with the rear facade broken by a small niche, surmounted by triangular pediment, while the presbytery gable can be seen from the grounds. Between the presbytery and sacristy is the bell tower with Roman arch, decorated with cornices, pinnacles and small belfrey flanked by vanes and cornice, with spire and weathervane.

=== Interior ===
The interior is decorated in polychromatic blue and white azulejo tile, with the ceiling covered in wood, divided into panels and reinforced with metal beams, further divided by friezes, cornices and equally-spaced corbels. The pavement consists of slabs of granite, with wood pedestals in lateral areas.

The main door is protected by wind-guard and flanked by two stone holy water fonts. Constructed in wood, the high choir is protected by balustrade and accessed by staircase on the left-hand side of the entrance. The lateral retables, painted in beige, blue and brown marble are dedicated to the Death of Saint Joseph (to the left) and Our Lady of Solitude (to the right).

To the left of the epistle, the rectangular pulpit sits on a marbled based with a wood guard painted in white, with access achieved through a lateral (left) staircase. The presbytery is on an elevated platform accessed by four central steps, leading to a triumphal archway on tuscan pilasters, surmounted by coat-of-arms. Flanking this archway are the lateral retables at angles, painted beige, blue and gold, dedicated to the Crucifixio (on the left) and Saint Anthony receiving Jesus and Mary (on the right).

The main chapel, elevated another three steps, is integrated into a large boulder, with two small retabular structures, dedicated to the Menino Jesus ('Baby Jesus') and Senhora da Boa Morte ('Our Lady of Good Death'), protected by iron grades, an oratory and nativity. Over the boulder is an oratory dedicated to Nossa Senhora das Dores ('Our Lady of Sorrows'). To the left is a doorway access to the Chapel of the Holy Sacrament, surmounted by a relief coat-of-arms, while flanked by pilasters topped by sculptures of lions is the arcosolium and grave of Pedro do Soveral. Immediately opposite is the small door to the sacristy, with a staircase access to the bell tower. The nativity, inset in the boulder, is protected by glass doors. The small cove with the Sagrada Família and Adoration of the Shepherds and central to the diorama, with Glória de Anjos and Deus Pai above, while to the left, is the Fuga para o Egipto ('Flight to Egypt'), while in the upper right is the cortege of the Wise Men, descending.

The grave of Pedro Soveral has the inscription: "JAZIGO E CAPELA DOS SUCESSORES DE PEDRO / DO SOVERAL FIDALGO DA CASA DEL REI CAVALEIRO DA / ORDEM DE CRISTO SENHOR DO MORGADO DE SERNANCELHE. ANO DE 1586. / INSTITUIDO POR FERNÃO PIRES DO SOVERAL / ALCAIDE MOR DE CELORICO POR MERCE DE EL / REI D. PEDRO I ANO DE 1366 QUE FES REFORMA SEU NETO TEOTÓNIO DO SOVERAL E VAZ. ANO DE 1732" ('Vault and chapel of the successors of Pedro of Soveral, Nobleman of the House of the King, Knight of the Order of Christ, Master of Sernancelhe. Year of 1586. Instituted by Fernão Pires do Soveral, alcalde of Celorico by the King Pedro I, Year of 1366, that reformed his grandson, Thetónio do Soveral e Vaz. Year of 1732').

Along the top is a Latin cartouche with the coat-of-arms and crown, with the inscription "DEO OPTIMO MAXIMO / IOSEPH Q. VASCONCELLIO / ORDINIS. DIVI. IOANNIS. MELITENS / IS EQVITI. TORQUATO / CERNANCELIO COMMENDATARIO / ACONITANO. BAIVLIVO / LVSITANAE- CLASSIS LEGATO / NAVALIS. DISCIPLINAE. PERITISSIMO / TVRCARVM. MAV RORV MOVE / QUOS. SAEPE MARI / NNAE QUALIBVS. VIRIDVS. PROFLIGAVIT / VICTO RI / ANTIQVIS MORIBVS VIRO / QUI VIXIT ANNIS LXX / IOSEPHVS ALMEIDENSIS SOVERALIVS / CARVALIVS VASCONCELLIVS / AVVNCVLO CARISSIMO / ATQVE INCOMPARABILI / FACITLNDVM CVRAVIT".

=== College ===
The church is connected to the college by a walkway-like corridor over a Roman arch, its corridor illuminated by rectangular windows on either side. It is about two to three stories tall, and adapted to the inclined terrain that the complex is built on. On the main floor of the northern face are three rectangular doorways, complemented by three guillotine-windows on the second floor. The eastern facade is protected by a wall of granite, also of three floors in height, with the first accessible by a single door; the second has picture windows and the third has eight windows (six of which are surmounted by cornices). The facade oriented towards the west, of two to three stories, is marked by rectangular doors and simple frames surmounted by five guillotine windows. The courtyard, also two floors in height, includes a single rectangular door with guillotine windows on the floor superior (one with Roman arch).

The interior corridors are covered in vaulted ceilings built on cornices, illuminated by rectangular windows and rectangular doorways to the various dependencies of the college.

== Culture ==
The chapel is the centre of annual pilgrimages on 10 June, 15 August, and 8 September, while Novenas regularly fall from 1 to 9 June and 6 to 14 August.
