= Cornelia Müller =

Linguist

Cornelia Müller is a linguist who works on pragmatic features of semantics, particularly metaphors in gesture. She is the Chair for Language Use and Multimodal Communication at Europa-Universität Viadrina Frankfurt (Oder). Müller along with Adam Kendon was a founding editor of Gesture, a peer reviewed journal published since 2001, and is a current member of the editorial board. Müller was also a founding editor of the Gesture Studies monograph series for Benjamins, with Kendon, from 2000–2009. Müller was a program chair for the 4th Conference of the International Society for Gesture Studies (ISGS) in 2010.

== Selected publications ==
- Müller, Cornelia, Alan Cienki, Ellen Fricke, Silva H. Ladewig, David McNeill and Sedinha Teßendorf (eds). 2013. Body – Language – Communication: An International Handbook on Multimodality in Human Interaction, Vol. 1. (Handbooks of Linguistics and Communication Science 38.1.). Berlin/ Boston: De Gruyter Mouton.
- Müller, Cornelia, Alan Cienki, Ellen Fricke, Silva H. Ladewig, David McNeill and Jana Bressem (eds). 2014. Body – Language – Communication: An International Handbook on Multimodality in Human Interaction, Vol. 2. (Handbooks of Linguistics and Communication Science 38.2.). Berlin/ Boston: De Gruyter Mouton.
- Müller, Cornelia. 2008. Metaphors Dead and Alive, Sleeping and Waking. A Dynamic View. Chicago: University of Chicago Press.
- Müller, Cornelia and Roland Posner (eds). 2004. The semantics and pragmatics of everyday gestures. Berlin: Weidler.
