= David Nash (linguist) =

Australian linguist (born 1951)

- Born: David George Nash; 5 March 1951 (age 75); Parkes, New South Wales, Australia

Academic background
- Education: Australian National University, Massachusetts Institute of Technology

Academic work
- Discipline: linguistics, field linguistics, anthropology

David George Nash (born 5 March 1951) is an Australian field linguist, specialising in the Aboriginal languages of Australia. Brought up in Parkes, New South Wales, he received a BA in pure mathematics from the Australian National University followed by an M.A. in linguistics. He then went to the Massachusetts Institute of Technology, where he studied with Ken Hale and received his PhD in linguistics in 1980. Before returning to Australia, he worked on the Lexicon Project at MIT. In 2005 he was Ken Hale Professor at the Linguistic Society of America Summer Institute. He works as a consultant for various Aboriginal organisations. He was also a Visiting Fellow of the Australian Institute of Aboriginal and Torres Strait Islander Studies.

Nash is an expert on Warlpiri and other languages of the Northern Territory of Australia as well as on the oral history of the Aboriginal peoples of this area. In this capacity, in addition to his purely scholarly work, he has provided expert testimony regarding land claims. He is also known for his knowledge of the history of research on Australian Aboriginal languages.

== Publications ==
- 1979. "Foreigners in their own land: Aborigines in court". Legal Service Bulletin 4.3,105-7.
- 1979. "Warlpiri vowel assimilations", pp. 12–24 in MIT Working Papers in Linguistics. Vol. 1. Papers on Syllable Structure, Metrical Structure and Harmony Processes, ed. by Ken Safir. Cambridge, Mass.: M.I.T.
- 1980. A Traditional Land Claim by the Warlmanpa, Warlpiri, Mudbura and Warumungu Traditional Owners. Alice Springs: Central Land Council.
- 1981. Preliminary vocabulary of the Warlmanpa language. 64pp., M.I.T., May, revised December 1979, June 1981. [with grammatical preface, and Capell text] Photocopied and distributed. AIAS Library. Revised as machine-readable data files. Deposited at ASEDA, AIATSIS.
- 1981. "Prospects for Warumungu literacy". Institute for Aboriginal Development, October 1981. Abridged version published in Aboriginal Languages Association Newsletter No. 3, May 1982:9-10.
- 1981 (ed.). Sourcebook for Central Australian Languages. Compiled by Kathy Menning. Pilot edition, November. Alice Springs: I.A.D. Machine-readable version deposited at ASEDA, AIATSIS, including vocabularies in Microsoft Excel spreadsheet. * bibliographies are included in Austlang, an AIATSIS project
- 1981 (with Jane Simpson)."No-name" in central Australia, pp. 165–77 in Papers from the Parasession on Language and Behavior, ed. by Carrie S. Masek et al. Chicago: Chicago Linguistic Society.
- 1982. An etymological note on Warlpiri kurdungurlu, pp. 141–59 in Languages of kinship in Aboriginal Australia, ed. by Jeffrey Heath, Francesca Merlan and Alan Rumsey. Oceania Linguistic Monographs No. 24. Sydney: University of Sydney.
- 1982. Review notice of R.M.W. Dixon: The Languages of Australia (CUP, 1980). Hemisphere 26.4 (January/February),234-5.
- 1982. "The outstation movement: the long road back". Central Australian Land Rights News 15,16. Outstation update. 16, Spring 1982,14.
- 1982. "Warlpiri verb roots and preverbs." In Stephen M. Swartz (ed.), Papers in Warlpiri grammar: In memory of Lothar Jagst, 165–216. Work Papers of the Summer Institute of Linguistics, Australian Aborigines Branch A, 6. Darwin: Summer Institute of Linguistics.
- 1999 (with B. Alpher). "Lexical replacement and cognate equilibrium in Australia", Australian Journal of Linguistics, Vol. 19, No.1(April), pp. 5–56.
- 2001. "Kenneth Locke Hale" [obituary], Australian Aboriginal Studies 2001/2,84-86.
- 2001. American's work spoke to Warlpiri. [Ken Hale obituary] Australian Time and Tide, 4 December 2001, p. 12.
- 2001. "Bibliography of Ken Hale and Australian languages", pp. 1–18 in Forty years on: Ken Hale and Australian languages, ed. by Jane Simpson et al. Canberra: Pacific Linguistics 512.
- 2001 (with Geoff O’Grady). Hale and O’Grady's 1960 SA and WA vocabularies, pp. 231–7 in Forty years on: Ken Hale and Australian languages, ed. by Jane Simpson et al. Canberra: Pacific Linguistics 512.
- 2001, (with J. Simpson, M. Laughren, P. Austin and B.Alpher, eds) Forty years on: Ken Hale and Australian languages. Canberra: Pacific Linguistics 512.
- 2002 (appeared March 2003). [review of] Scott Cane, Pila Nguru: The Spinifex People (Fremantle Arts Centre Press, 2002). Australian Aboriginal Studies 2002/2.97-100. * errata and addenda (not published in AAS)
- 2002. Mary Alice WARD (1896–1972), pp. 490–1 in Australian dictionary of biography. Volume 16. 1940-1980 Pik-Z, edited by John Ritchie and Diane Langmore. Melbourne University Press. * launch: Adelaide, 12 November 2002
- [n.d.] "Luther, Maurice Jupurrurla (c. 1945–1985)", Australian Dictionary of Biography, National Centre of Biography, Australian National University, accessed 21 March 2022.
- 2002. "Proving country, prospecting for places: re-visiting Karlantijpa country", pp. 164–9 in Planning for Country. Cross-cultural approaches to decision-making on Aboriginal lands, ed. by Fiona Walsh and Paul Mitchell. Alice Springs: Jukurrpa Books (IAD Press). ix+203pp. ISBN 1-86465-037-0 Central Land Council * launch 28 August, Alice Springs
- 2002 (with John Henderson, eds) Language in Native Title. Canberra: AIATSIS Native Title Research Unit, Aboriginal Studies Press. * Papers presented to the Linguistic Issues in Native Title Claims workshop, Australian Linguistic Society (ALS) annual conference, University of WA, Saturday 2 October 1999.
- 2002. "Historical linguistic geography of south-east Western Australia", pp. 205–30 in Language in Native Title, ed. by John Henderson & David Nash. Canberra: AIATSIS Native Title Research Unit, Aboriginal Studies Press.
- 2002. Ken Hale 1934-2001 [obituary] GLOT International, Vol. 5 No. 9/10, November/December 2001, pages 339–340. [PDF, with permission]
- 2002 (editor, with John Henderson). Language in Native Title. Canberra: Native Title Research Unit, AIATSIS.
- 2003. "Authenticity in toponymy", in Blythe, J. and R. McKenna Brown (eds): Maintaining the links: Language, identity and the land. (Proceedings of the Seventh FEL Conference, Broome, Western Australia, 22–24 September.) Bath, UK: Foundation for Endangered Languages.
- 2005. Kenneth Hale, pp. 432–5 in Volume A-L, Encyclopedia of linguistics, ed. by Philipp Strazny. New York, Abingdon: Fitzroy Dearborn / Routledge Reference (Taylor and Francis). 2 volumes. ISBN 1-57958-391-1(set) 1-57958-450-0 (v.1)
- 2006. "Comment", pp. 54–55, on Reassessing Australia's linguistic prehistory by Mark Clendon, Current Anthropology 47.1 (February 2006), 39–61.
- 2022. (edited and annotated, with JPM Long). Diary — Walker Bros Prospecting Expedition 1913. Western Australian Explorers’ Diaries series. Carlisle, WA: Hesperian Press. ISBN 978-0-85905-727-1 http://www.hesperianpress.com/index.php/western-australian-explorers-diaries-project
- 2025. Where strange words fit: Channelling Alice Duncan-Kemp, pp. 613–682, Chapter 20, in 'Section 4: Lexicon' in Projecting voices: Studies in language and linguistics in honour of Jane Simpson, edited by Carmel O'Shannessy, James Gray and Denise Angelo. Asia-Pacific Linguistics series of ANU Press. http://doi.org/10.22459/PV.2025.20
