= Françoise Dussart =

Professor of anthropology

- Born: May 14, 1959 (age 67); Paris, France
- Education: Australian National University
- Occupation: Professor
- Employer: University of Connecticut

Françoise Dussart (born 14 May 1959 in Paris) is a professor in the Department of Anthropology and the Department of Women's, Gender and Sexuality Studies at the University of Connecticut. Trained in France and Australia, her specialties in social anthropology include Australian Aboriginal society and culture (as well as other Fourth World Peoples), iconography and visual systems, various expressions of gender, ritual and social organization, health and citizenship.

== Career ==
Dussart's career in anthropology began at the Sorbonne, where she studied the ethnolinguistic nuances of West African naming systems, the culture of street performers in Paris, and the slate factories of southern France. She received her Ph.D. degree from the Australian National University for fieldwork with the Warlpiri people living in the Tanami Desert. Since then, she has also devoted herself to curatorial efforts involving the acrylic painting of Central Desert Aborigines. She has published extensively on matters of Oceanian art for scholarly journals and the popular press, in French and in English. She has also consulted for numerous museums worldwide, writing catalogs, essays and assisting in general collection development.

She is currently working on two related projects, a long-term research project, which investigates how indigenized modernity and indigenous ill-health play a prominent part in shaping neo-settler states such as Australia, for which she has published papers on how Warlpiri people from Central Australia cope with chronic ill-health on a daily basis. She curated the first comprehensive major exhibition of contemporary Aboriginal and Torres Strait Islander arts (over 100 artworks) from Australia in Canada, at the Musée de la Civilisation in Quebec City. This exhibition titled Lifelines: Contemporary Indigenous Art from Australia opened 20 October 2015 and will close 6 September 2016. She currently resides in Providence with her husband and children.

Remove entire section as a copyright violation
