= Reenactment =

Reenactment, re-enactment or reënactment may refer to:

== Legislation ==
- Consolidation bill, a bill that consolidates several Acts of Parliament into a single Act in the United Kingdom
- Repeal with reenactment, where a law is replaced with one more suitable

== Other uses ==
- Docudrama, genre of radio and television programming, feature film, and staged theatre
- Historical reenactment, educational or entertainment activity
- Pastiche, a work of art that imitates the style or character of another artist
- The Reenactment, 1968 Romanian film based on a novel by Horia Pătraşcu

== See also ==
- Adaptation (arts), a transfer of a work of art from one medium to another
- Dramatization (disambiguation)
- Enactment (disambiguation)
- Remake, a film or television series that is based on an earlier work
- Simulation, the imitation of a real-world process or system
