= Lapa station =

Lapa station may refer to:

- Lapa station (CPTM line 7), a metro station on line 7 of the São Paulo Metro in the city of São Paulo, Brazil
- Lapa station (CPTM line 8), a metro station on line 8 of the São Paulo Metro in the city of São Paulo, Brazil
- Lapa station (Porto Metro), a light rail station on the Porto Metro in the city of Porto, Portugal
- Lapa station (Salvador Metro), a metro station on the Salvador Metro in the city of Salvador, Brazil
- Lapa station (Vouga line), a railway station on the Vouga line in the district of Aveiro, Portugal

== See also ==
- Lapa (disambiguation)
- Lapa Terminal (disambiguation)
