= Sernancelhe e Sarzeda =

- Civil parish
- Location in Portugal
- Coordinates: 40.900°N 7.494°W
- Country: Portugal
- Region: Norte
- Intermunic. comm.: Douro
- District: Viseu
- Municipality: Sernancelhe

Area
  - Total: 44.78 km^{2} (17.29 sq mi)

Population (2011)
  - Total: 1,713
  - Density: 38.25/km^{2} (99.08/sq mi)
- Time zone: UTC+00:00 (WET)
  - Summer (DST): UTC+01:00 (WEST)

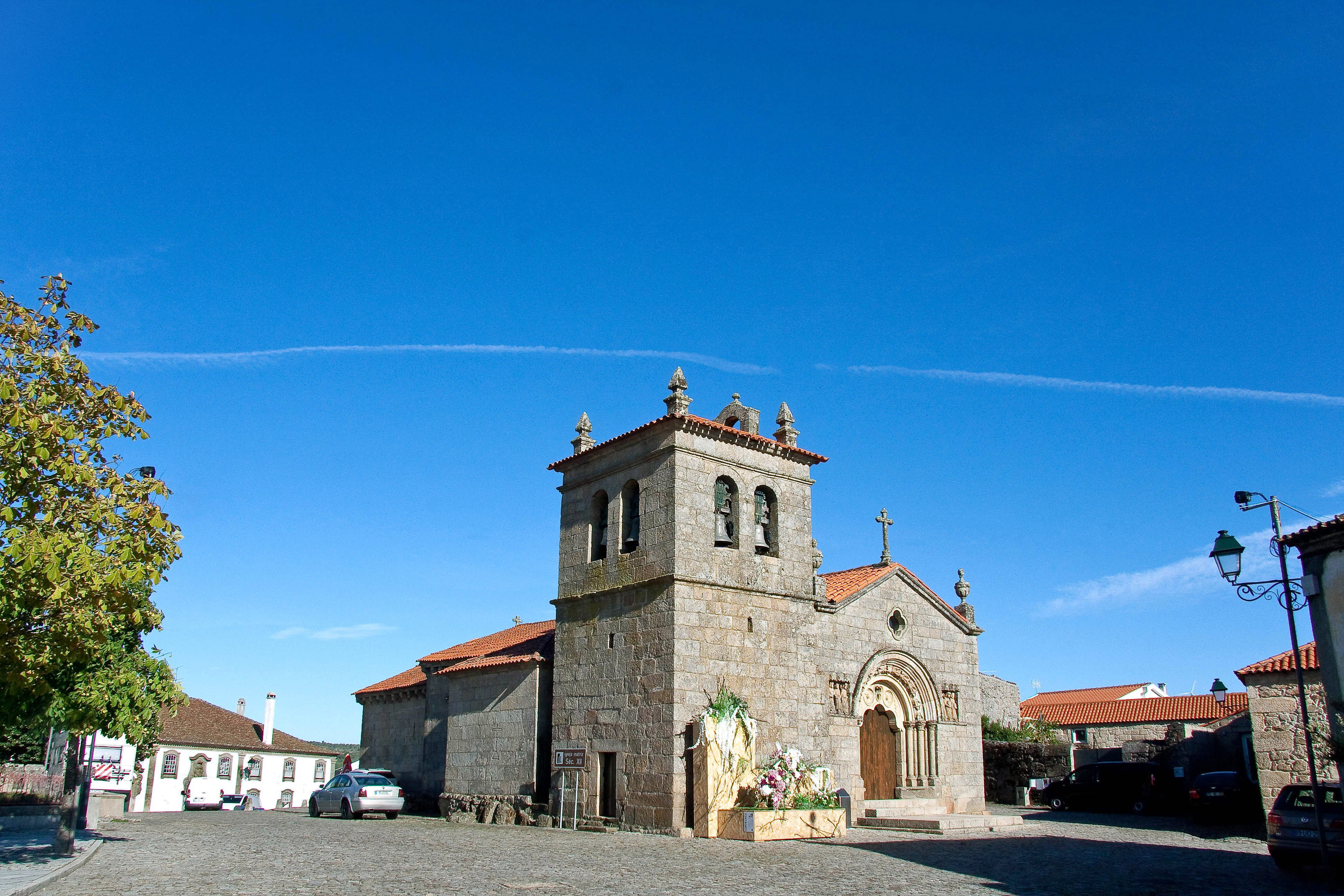
Sernancelhe Parish Church

Sernancelhe e Sarzeda is a civil parish in the municipality of Sernancelhe, Portugal. It was formed in 2013 by the merger of the former parishes Sernancelhe and Sarzeda. The population in 2011 was 1,713, in an area of 44.78 km^{2}.
