= Darby Jampijinpa Ross =

Australian Warlpiri artist and elder (c. 1905–2005)

Darby Jampijinpa Ross (c. 1905 – 14 March 2005) was a respected Warlpiri elder who was born at Ngarnayarlpirri in the Tanami Desert. He had responsibility for many Jukurrpa and spent much of his life at Yuendumu. He was a founding member of the Warlukurlangu Artists who he began painting for in 1985.

He is often referred to as one of the last 'old people' at Yuendumu to really know the country, the songs, the names of the plants and animals and to have traversed large tracts of land on foot. Many Warlpiri songs, dances, stories, words pictures and place names died with him.

== Life in the Northern Territory ==
Ross was born around 1905 and, despite the many oral histories that were recorded of him, little is known of the early period of his life. Some of the first memories of his early life that Ross talk of is his survival of the Coniston massacre in 1928, when he was a young man, he lost many family members in this massacre. He has said of this:

My sister, all about they get shot, too, there. And my brother-in-law. They finish all up there. And from there, they [Constable Murray’s party] bin look: ‘‘Oh, enough here.’ Oh, him bin puttem heap, little children and big boy, young man, and big boy ... children. Oh, every-thing there! Women there, young girl. They killem whole lot there

— Darby Jampijinpa Ross, as quoted in 'Walking a Different Road' (2004)

As an adult man Ross worked held a variety of jobs, including as a tracker, butcher and post man. Between 1931 and 1932 Ross spent two years working at The Granites gold mine and spent much of that time carting water for Jack Saxby and Jack Atherton based at the Burdekin Duck mine. As an Aboriginal man, he camped some distance away from them with other Warlpiri people at the field. Later he and Saxby would travel to Coniston Station, where he had survived the massacre, and begin working as a stockman and drover (including many trips on the Murranji Track) there and soon became the 'proper head drover man'.

During World War II Ross began working as a wolfram miner at Hatches Creek and, later in the war, spent some time working with the Native Labour Gang in Alice Springs where he unloaded supply vehicles and collected firewood. During this time he stayed, alongside other workers, at the Alice Springs Telegraph Station. After the war Ross married Lady Nakamarra, an Alyawarre woman.

In 1952, following its creation, Ross moved to Yuendumu, which was then known as the Yuendumu Aboriginal Reserve, and based himself there for the remainder of his life. He was a strong leader within the community.

In 1985 he began painting with Warlukurlangu Artists, of whom he was one of their founding members, and by the time of his retirement as an artist he had painted 120 documented paintings for them and exhibited extensively. His artworks depict many Warlpiri Jukurrpa's including those of the flying ant and emu Dreaming's. Many of his works are now held in major public galleries and collections around the world.

Ross died in 2005, while residing at Hetti Perkins Hostel in Alice Springs just 1 day after receiving a telegram from the Queen congratulating him on turning 100 years old.

== Publications ==
Ross' life story is took in the book Darby: one hundred years of life in a changing culture by Liam Campbell which was published in 2006. This book is an account of his life and Ross worked closely with Campbell, and was interviewed many times, to complete it. The pair had a relationship over a 30-year period. Ross said of it:

I am Jampijinpa.

I am telling my own true story.

I'm a poor old man now.

— Darby Jampijinpa Ross, Darby (2006)

This book includes a CD of songs and stories that were recorded by Ross.
