= Rosie Nangala Fleming =

Australian artist and sculptor (1928–2015)

Rosie Nangala Fleming (1928–2015) was an Australian Warlpiri painter and sculptor.

Her work is included in the collections of the Seattle Art Museum, the National Gallery of Victoria and the Brighton and Hove Museums and Art Galleries.

In the 1970s she founded the Warlpiri Women's Museum.

Fleming died in 2015.
