= Institute of Analytics Professionals of Australia =

The Institute of Analytics Professionals of Australia (IAPA) is the professional organisation for the analytics industry, incorporating business data analytics, business intelligence, data mining and related industries.

== IAPA as an organisation ==
As an organisation, it provides information sources, a "virtual community", a "networking hub" and a "professional identity". IAPA promotes the benefits of analytics in modern business, emphasising the increasingly strategic role played by data analysis in the business arena.

Chapters have been established in Sydney, Melbourne, Canberra, Brisbane, Perth and Adelaide. As of October 2012 IAPA has over 2,400 members and runs quarterly meetings in each location providing industry speakers and an opportunity for members to network.

The IAPA website acts as the portal for Analytics professionals in Australia, providing information on relevant Events, Articles of interest and Special interest groups. The website itself hasn’t been updated since around 2023, so information may not be considered current.

== See also ==
- Australian Computer Society
