= Sernancelhe =

- Municipality
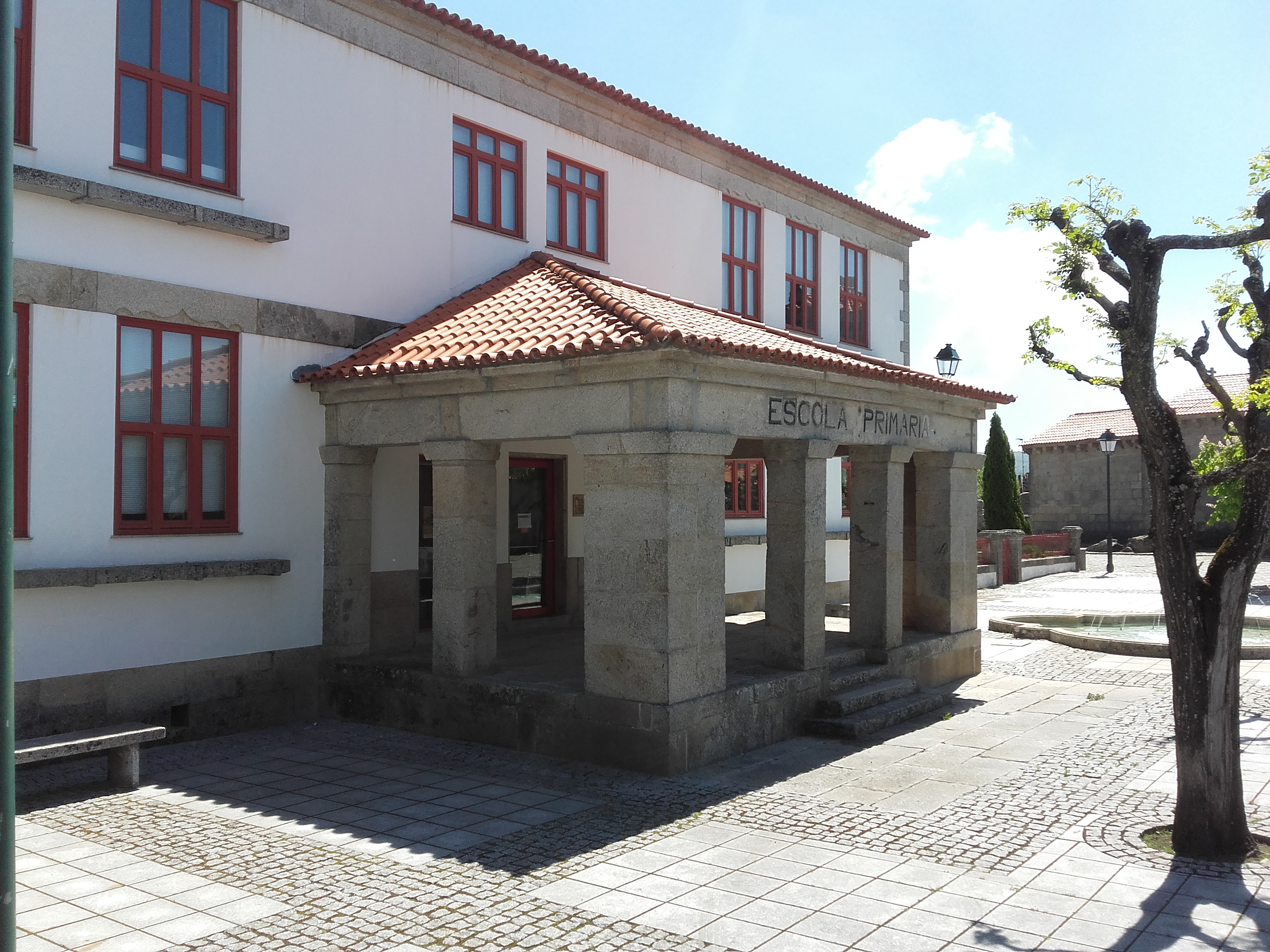
- View of Sernancelhe

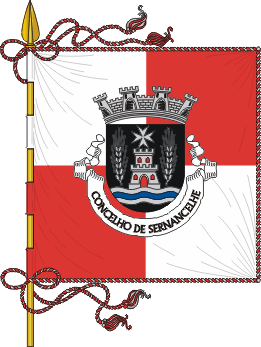
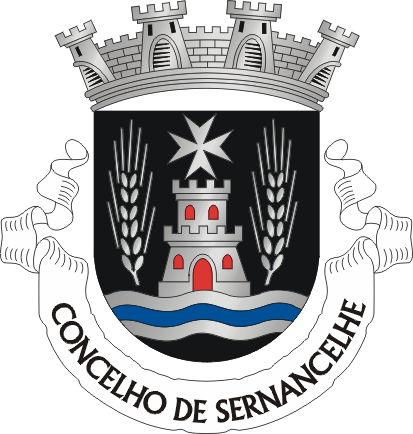
- Flag Coat of arms
- Interactive map of Sernancelhe
- Coordinates: 40°53′N 7°29′W
- Country: Portugal
- Region: Norte
- Intermunic. comm.: Douro
- District: Viseu
- Parishes: 13

Government
  - President: Carlos Silva (PSD)

Area
  - Total: 228.61 km^{2} (88.27 sq mi)

Population (2011)
  - Total: 5,671
  - Density: 24.81/km^{2} (64.25/sq mi)
- Time zone: UTC+00:00 (WET)
  - Summer (DST): UTC+01:00 (WEST)
- Website: http://www.cm-sernancelhe.pt

Sernancelhe (Portuguese pronunciation: [sɨɾnɐ̃ˈsɐʎɨ]) is a municipality in the district Viseu, Portugal. The population in 2011 was 5671, in an area of 228.61 km^{2}.

The present mayor is Carlos Silva Santiago, elected by the Social Democratic Party. The municipal holiday is May 3.

== Parishes ==
The municipality is composed of 13 parishes:

- Arnas
- Carregal
- Chosendo
- Cunha
- Faia
- Ferreirim e Macieira
- Fonte Arcada e Escurquela
- Granjal
- Lamosa
- Penso e Freixinho
- Quintela
- Sernancelhe e Sarzeda
- Vila da Ponte

== Notable people ==
- João Rodrigues Tçuzu (1561/2 – 1633/4) soldier, interpreter and priest; known for his early linguistic works on Japanese; introducing western science and culture to Korea
- Francisco de Soveral (ca.1565 – 1642) a Portuguese prelate; 9th Bishop of São Tomè and the 5th Bishop of Angola and Congo, 1627 to 1642.
- Sebastião José de Carvalho e Melo, Marquis of Pombal and Count of Oeiras (Sernancelhe, 13 May 1699 – Pombal, 8 May 1782) was a Portuguese nobleman, diplomat and statesman. He was Secretary of State of the Kingdom during the reign of King José I (1750-1777), and is still considered one of the most controversial and charismatic figures in Portuguese history.
- Aquilino Ribeiro (1885–1963) a writer and diplomat; nominated for the Nobel Prize for Literature in 1960 for his novels
