= Eliot Chapple =

American anthropologist

Eliot Dismore Chapple (April 29, 1909 – August 9, 2000, Sarasota) was an American anthropologist. In 1941, he was one of the founders of the Society for Applied Anthropology, and its first president. His 1942 work with Carleton Coon applied the notion of conditioned learning to understanding the human use of symbols in various cultural contexts. He later invented the Interaction Chronograph to develop this concept. By 1970, he had understood these phenomena as emotional-interactional rhythms and part of fundamental biological rhythmic dynamics. Sociologists including George Herbert Mead developed symbolic interactionism from ideas including Chapple's insights. Eugene D'Aquili's work in Biogenetic Structuralism also referenced Chapple's work.

In 2000 he received the Conrad Arensberg Award (awarded for outstanding contributions to the field) from the American Anthropological Association.

He received his Ph.D. from Harvard University in 1933.

== Works ==
- Principles of anthropology (1942), with Carleton Stevens Coon
- The Biological Foundations of Individuality and Culture (1980/1970), (retitled from Culture and Biological Man (1970))
