= Warlmanpa language =

Australian Aboriginal language

Warlmanpa
- Region: Northern Territory, Australia
- Ethnicity: Warlmanpa
- Native speakers: 30 (2005) to 48 (2006 census)
- Language family: Pama–Nyungan: Ngumpin–Yapa; Ngarrkic; Warlmanpa
- Signed forms: Warlmanpa Sign Language

Language codes
- ISO 639-3: wrl
- Glottolog: warl1255
- AIATSIS: C17
- ELP: Warlmanpa

Warlmanpa (also Walmala) is a nearly extinct Australian Aboriginal language spoken by the Warlmanpa people.

The Warlmanpa have a highly developed sign language.

One of the first recordings of this language was made by Kenneth Hale in his interview with Donald Jupurrula Graham in 1966.

== Phonology ==
Warlmanpa vowel inventory
	Front	Back
High	i iː	u uː
Low	a aː	

Warlmanpa consonant inventory
		Bilabial	Apico- alveolar	Apico- domal	Lamino- alveolar	Dorso- velar
Plosive	lax	p	t	ʈ	c	k
Plosive	tense	pː	tː	ʈː	cː	kː
Nasal		m	n	ɳ	ɲ	ŋ
Lateral			l	ɭ	ʎ	
Flap			ɾ			
Glide		w		ɻ	j	
