= Lapa Terminal (São Paulo) =

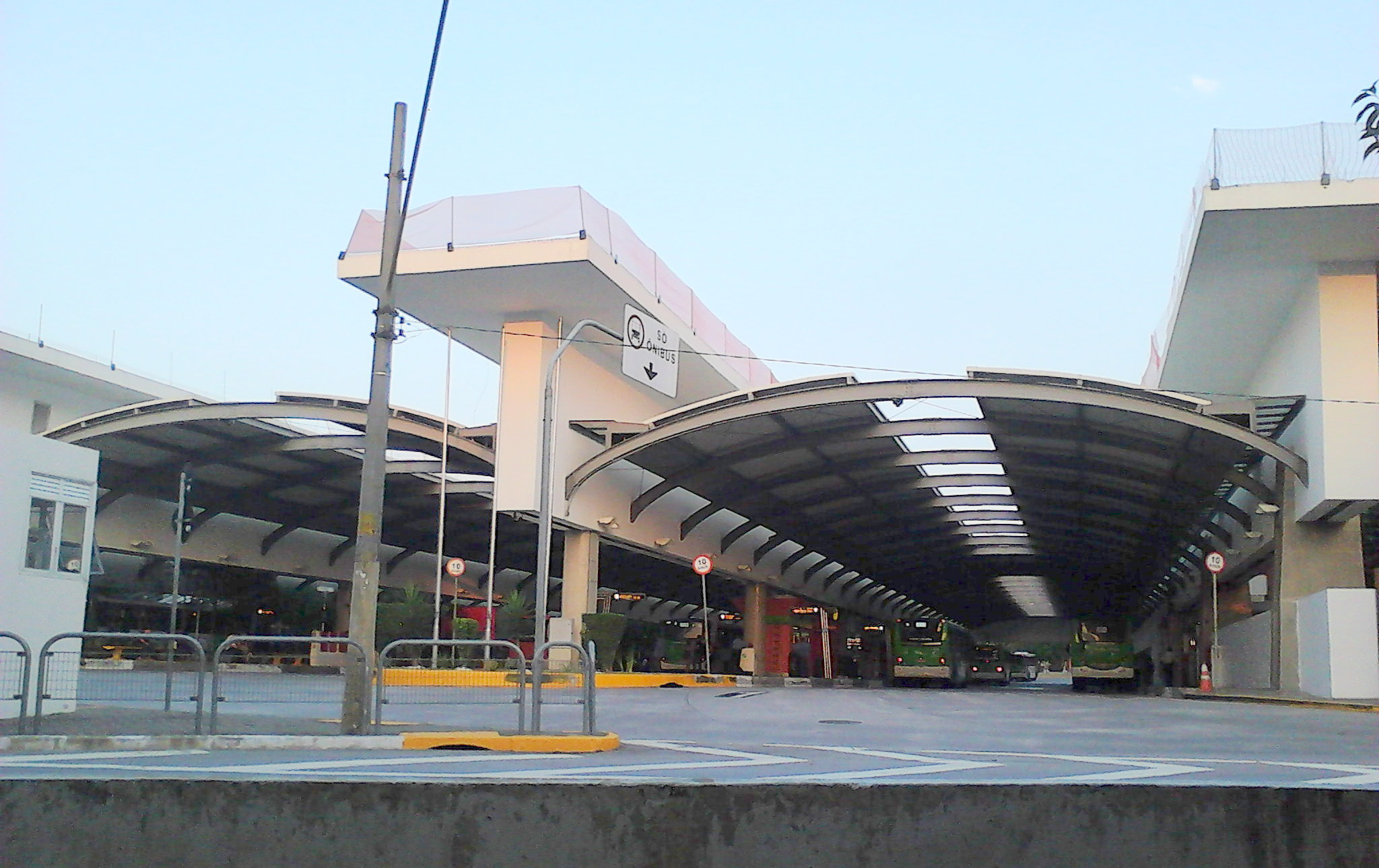
A picture of the Bus terminus of Lapa, West Zone of São Paulo, Brazil.

Lapa Terminal is a bus terminal in the western part of São Paulo, Brazil.
