= Lapa, Nepal =

Lapa, Nepal लापा
- Village development committee
- Location in Nepal
- Coordinates: 28.21°N 85.02°E
- Country: Nepal
- Zone: Bagmati Zone
- District: Dhading District

Population (1991)
  - Total: 3,809
  - Religions: Buddhist
- Time zone: UTC+5:45 (Nepal Time)

Lapa, Nepal is a village development committee in Dhading District in the Bagmati Zone of central Nepal. At the time of the 1991 Nepal census it had a population of 3809 and had 757 houses in it.
