= Adam Kendon =

British linguist and semiotician (1934–2022)

- Born: 4 April 1934
- Died: 14 September 2022 (aged 88)
- Education: University of Cambridge and University of Oxford
- Spouse: Margaret Rhoads
- Scientific career
- Fields: Gesture

Adam Kendon (4 April 1934 – 14 September 2022) was an English linguist and semiotician. He was considered one of the world's foremost authorities on the topic of gesture, which he viewed broadly as meaning all the ways in which humans use visible bodily action in creating utterances including not only how this is done in speakers but also in the way it is used in speakers or signers when only visible bodily action is available for expression.

== Early life ==
Kendon was born on 4 April 1934 in London, son of the writer Frank Kendon and Elizabeth Cecilia Phyllis Horne, a school teacher.

At the University of Cambridge, he read Botany, Zoology and Human Physiology, as well as Experimental Psychology for the Natural Sciences. At the University of Oxford, he studied Experimental Psychology, focusing on the temporal organization of utterances in conversation, using Eliot Chapple's chronography. Then he moved to Cornell University to study directly with Chapple on research leading to his D. Phil. from Oxford in 1963. His thesis topic—communication conduct in face-to-face interaction—spelled out the interests he would pursue in subsequent decades. He is noted for his study of gesture and sign languages and how these relate to spoken language.

== Career ==
After completing the D. Phil., he accepted a position in the Institute of Experimental Psychology at Oxford, where he worked in a research group with Michael Argyle and E.R.W.F. Crossmann. He initially focused on sign systems in Papua New Guinea and Australian Aboriginal sign languages, before developing a general framework for understanding gestures with the same kind of rigorous semiotic analysis as has been previously applied to spoken language.

Important influences on his theoretical understandings included: Erving Goffman, Albert Scheflen, Ray Birdwhistell, and Gregory Bateson. Becoming aware of Scheflen's work in 1965, while still at Oxford, he managed to meet him in Philadelphia, where he shared his earliest work; as a result, he was first invited to join William S. Condon's research team at the Western Psychiatric Institute and Clinic in 1966-67, and then to join Scheflen's research team at Bronx State Hospital in 1967. He never actually worked with Birdwhistell directly, but they were in contact, and he did work with films made available to him by Birdwhistell.

In 1976, he took up an appointment in Canberra, Australia at the Department of Anthropology in the Research School of Pacific Studies, Australian National University. He undertook filming everyday interaction in Papua New Guinea but also was able to record a sign language in use in the valley where he worked where there was a considerable number of deaf persons. His publication of this work, in three articles in 1980, proved to be a pioneering study; no other accounts on sign language from this part of the world were to appear until the beginning of the twenty-first century. This work was republished as a monograph together with a new essay written by colleagues bringing the original work up to date. After this he undertook a major investigation of the sign languages in use among indigenous Australians - these are sign languages used for ritual reasons or for practical reasons in situations where speech might is impractical or inappropriate. These are known as alternate sign languages, distinguishing them from primary sign languages developed among deaf people. Extensive documentation of his research in Australia is available at the library of the Australian Institute of Aboriginal and Torres Strait Islander Studies.

In 1988, he returned to Philadelphia, teaching for two years at the Annenberg School for Communication at the University of Pennsylvania.

Kendon then moved to Naples, Italy and undertook fieldwork on the use of gesture in everyday interaction among Neapolitans and also published a translation of a 19th Century book about Neapolitan gesture (by Andrea de Jorio), comparing it to gesturing among the Greeks and Romans. In 2004 he published an important general book on the phenomena of gesture which drew extensively on his work in Naples as well as his work in New Guinea and Australia, the United States and the United Kingdom. Since then he has published various articles on gesture and related topics, including discussions of the place of gesture in theories about language origins.

In 2012, he returned to Cambridge, where he spent the rest of his life, associated with the Division of Biological Anthropology at Cambridge, and an Honorary Professor in Psychology and Language Sciences at University College London. In 2014 at UCL, he presented a lecture series "Topics in the study of gesture."

Kendon received research grants from the National Science Foundation, the Wenner-Gren Foundation for Anthropological Research, the American Council of Learned Societies, as well as a Guggenheim Fellowship. In addition to the previously mentioned positions at Oxford and Bronx State Hospital, he held research positions at the University of Pittsburgh and Indiana University in the United States, the Australian National University and the Australian Institute for Aboriginal and Torres Straits Islander Studies in Australia; and the Max Planck Institute for Psycholinguistics in Germany. In addition to teaching at Oxford and Penn, he held positions at Cornell University and Connecticut College in the US, as well as the Università degli Studi di Napoli "L'Orientale", the University of Salerno and the University of Calabria in Italy. Kendon was a founding editor of the journal GESTURE (published by John Benjamins of Amsterdam), along with Cornelia Müller, in 2000. He was the sole editor from 2010 to April 2017, when he was replaced by Sotaro Kita. In his role as editor of GESTURE he was an Ex Officio member of the board of the International Society for Gesture Studies, of which he was elected Honorary President in 2006.

He edited the book series Gesture Studies for John Benjamins, with 9 volumes published between 2007 and 2022. Colleagues prepared a festschrift in 2014, honoring his contribution to the study of gestures and interaction. In 2016, Frederick Erickson interviewed Kendon about his techniques for analyzing both videotapes and live interaction for the conference “Learning how to look and listen: Building capacity for video-based transcription and analysis in social and educational research;” the videos of their conversations have been made publicly available.

== Personal life ==
Kendon married Margaret Rhoads in 1961; they had three children, Gudrun, Benjamin and Angus.

== Selected publications ==
Books authored:

- Kendon, Adam. (1977). Studies in the Behavior of Face-to-Face Interaction. Lisse, Netherlands: Peter De Ridder Press.
- Kendon, Adam. (1988). Sign Languages of Aboriginal Australia: Cultural, Semiotic and Communicative Perspectives. Cambridge: Cambridge University Press.
- Kendon, Adam. (1990). Conducting Interaction: Patterns of Behavior in Focused Encounters. Cambridge: Cambridge University Press.
- Kendon, Adam. (2004). Gesture: Visible Action as Utterance. Cambridge: Cambridge University Press.
- Kendon, Adam. (2020). Sign language in Papua New Guinea: A primary sign language from the Upper Lagaip Valley, Enga Province. Amsterdam: John Benjamins.

Book translated:

- Kendon, Adam. (2000). Gesture in Naples and Gesture in Classical Antiquity: An English translation, with an Introductory Essay and Notes of La mimica degli antichi investigata nel gestire Napoletano (Gestural expression of the ancients in the light of Neapolitan gesturing) by Andrea de Jorio (1832). Bloomington: Indiana University Press.

Books edited:

- Kendon, Adam, Harris, Richard M., Key, Mary R. (Eds.). (1975). The Organization of Behavior in Face-to-Face Interaction. The Hague: Mouton.
- Kendon, Adam (Ed.). (1981). Nonverbal Communication, Interaction and Gesture: Selections from Semiotica. The Hague: Mouton.
- Bichakjian, Bernard H.; Chernigovskaya, Tatiana; Kendon, Adam; & Möller, Anke. (Eds.). (2000). Becoming loquens: More studies in language origins. Frankfurt am Main, Germany: Peter Lang.

Selected Shorter publications:

- Kendon, Adam. (1967). Some functions of gaze-direction in social interaction. Acta Psychologica, 26, 22-63.
- Argyle, Michael, & Kendon, Adam. (1967). The experimental analysis of social performance. In Leonard Berkowitz (Ed.), Advances in Experimental Social Psychology (Vol. 3, pp. 55–98). New York:Academic Press.
- Kendon, Adam, & Cook, Mark. (1969). The consistency of gaze patterns in social interaction. British Journal of Psychology, 60(4), 481-494.
- Kendon, Adam. (1970). Movement coordination in social interaction: Some examples described. Acta Psychologica, 32, 101-125.
- Kendon, Adam. (1972). Some relationships between body motion and speech. In Aaron W. Seigman and Benjamin Pope (Eds.), Studies in Dyadic Communication (pp. 177–216). Elmsford, New York: Pergamon Press.
- Kendon, Adam. (1980). Gesticulation and speech: Two aspects of the process of utterance. In Mary Ritchie Key (Ed.), The relationship of verbal and nonverbal communication (pp. 207–227). The Hague: Mouton.
- Kendon, Adam. (1983). The Study of Gesture: Some Remarks on its History. In John N. Deely & Margot D. Lenhart (Eds.), Semiotics 1981: Yearbook of the Semiotic Society of America (pp. 153–164). New York: Plenum.
- Kendon, Adam. (1988). How gestures can become like words. In Fernando Poyatos (Ed.), Crosscultural Perspectives in Nonverbal Communication (pp. 131–141). Toronto: C. J. Hogrefe, Publishers.
- Kendon, Adam. (1992). The negotiation of context in face-to-face interaction. In Alessandro Duranti & Charles Goodwin (Eds.), Rethinking Context: Language as an interactive phenomenon (pp. 323–334). Cambridge: Cambridge University Press.
- Kendon, Adam. (1994). Do gestures communicate? A review. Research on Language and Social Interaction, 27(3), 175-200.
- Kendon, Adam. (1995). Gestures as illocutionary and discourse structure markers in Southern Italian conversation. Journal of Pragmatics, 23(3), 247-279.
- Kendon, Adam. (1997). Gesture. Annual Review of Anthropology, 26, 109-128.
- Kendon, Adam. (2000). Language and Gesture: Unity or Duality. In David McNeill (Ed.), Language and Gesture: Window into Thought and Action (pp. 47–63). Cambridge: Cambridge University Press.
- Kendon, Adam. (2013). History of the Study of Gesture. In Keith Allan (Ed.), Oxford Handbook for the History of Linguistics (pp. 71–90). Oxford: Oxford University Press.
- Kendon, Adam. (2015). Gesture and sign: Utterance uses of visible bodily action. In Keith Allen (Ed.), The Routledge Handbook of Linguistics (pp. 33–46). London: Routledge.
- Kendon, Adam. (2017). Pragmatic functions of gestures: Some observations on the history of their study and their nature. Gesture, 16(2), 157-175.
- Kendon, Adam. (2019). Gesture and anthropology: Notes for an historical essay. Gesture, 18(2-3), 142-172.

== See also ==
- Nonverbal communication
- Ray Birdwhistell
- Eliot Chapple
- Cornelia Müller
