= Quintela =

- Civil parish
- Location in Portugal
- Coordinates: 40.861°N 7.582°W
- Country: Portugal
- Region: Norte
- Intermunic. comm.: Douro
- District: Viseu
- Municipality: Sernancelhe

Area
  - Total: 13.77 km^{2} (5.32 sq mi)

Population (2011)
  - Total: 294
  - Density: 21/km^{2} (55/sq mi)
- Time zone: UTC+00:00 (WET)
  - Summer (DST): UTC+01:00 (WEST)

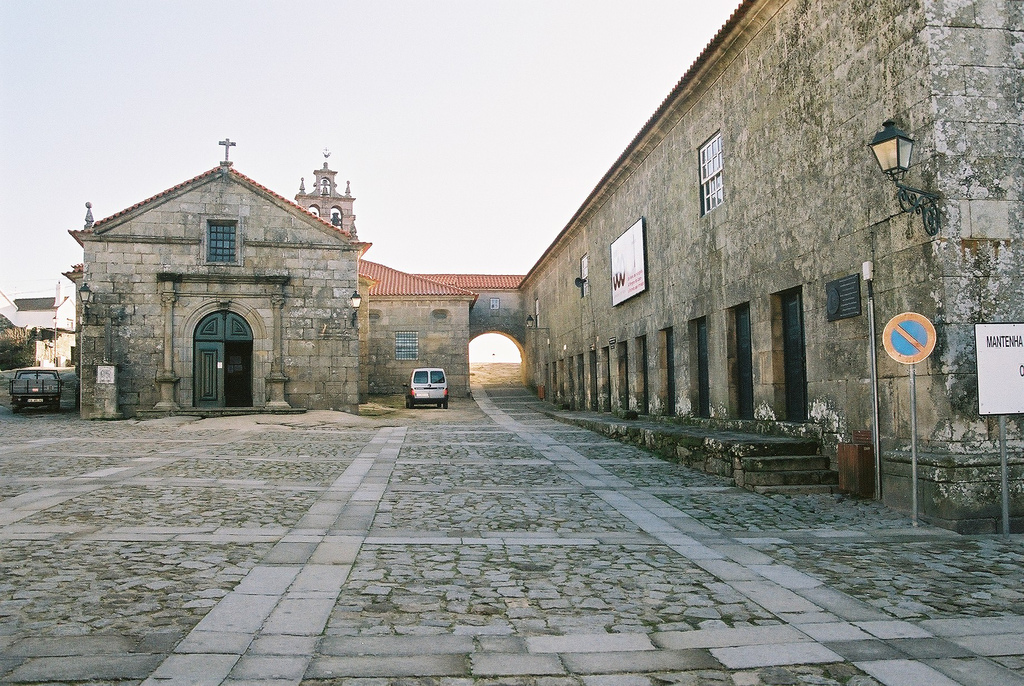
The Lapa Sanctuary, with de Jesuit College at the right. Sernancelhe, Portugal

Quintela (Portuguese pronunciation: [kĩˈtɛlɐ]) is a civil parish in the municipality of Sernancelhe, Portugal. The population in 2011 was 294, in an area of 13.77 km^{2}.
