= Enactment effect =

Improved memory of verb phrases by acting them out

The enactment effect, also called the self-performed task effect (SPT effect), refers to the fact that assigned verb phrases are more recallable if the denoted action is performed during learning, compared to just getting the verbal information or seeing someone else perform the action. The use of gestures increases the quantity, retention period, and accessibility of recallable phrases. Knowing that enacting improves memory performance can be useful in education and treatment of patients with memory disorders.

== Studies showing the enactment effect ==
In their study, Engelkamp and Krumnacker (1980) gave participants verbal phrases like "brush the teeth" or "shuffle the cards". In a recognition task and a free recall task, the memory of participants was tested under four learning conditions: one group performed the action, a second group was supposed to imagine the action, the third group watched someone perform the action, and the last group just heard the phrases. The group that had enacted the gestures performed best in both tasks. Around the same time, Cohen examined recall capacity of verbal phrases in participants under three conditions: one group performed the action on a concrete object, a second group saw the experimenter perform the action on an object, and a third group only got verbal instructions. The self-performed task led to the best results, supporting the claim that the enactment effect exists. Since then, the effect has been reduplicated in many studies. Recall after enactment tasks was shown to be superior to recall after verbal tasks in children as well as in adults. Furthermore, enactment is effective in elderly people and people with moderate dementia of the Alzheimer type.

== Enactment effect in second language acquisition ==
Gestures have been shown to be a useful tool in teaching a foreign language. The enactment effect can be leveraged in second language teaching. Various studies have shown the use of gestures while learning new words improves recall and retention. The enactment effect in second language learning could be shown in children as well as adults. Not only does enactment improve memorization, but also the use of words in speech production. Using gestures while learning is helpful in learning concrete words as well as abstract words such as “change” or “difference”. Studies supported this claim in showing that abstract words were better remembered when a gesture was used while encoding.

== Neurolinguistical research on the enactment effect ==
In more recent studies, researchers have been trying to find the neurological explanation of the enactment effect, and the reason why memory is enhanced after enactment. It was shown that not mere physical motor information leads to the enactment effect, but that the semantic content of the gesture plays a role as well. Iconic gestures enhance memory compared to meaningless gestures which have no positive effect on memorization. Event-related potentials showed that enactment leads to deeper processing of new information, eliciting the assumption that by using gestures, the meaning of the new word is connected with an already existing concept in one's native language.
