= Warlpiri people =

Australian Aboriginal people of Tanami Desert region

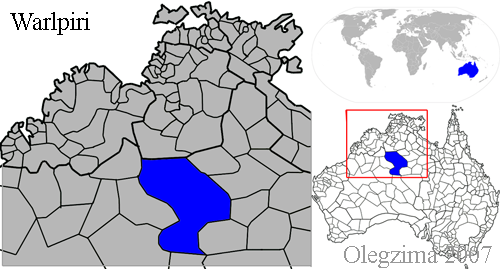
Warlpiri country

The Warlpiri, sometimes referred to as Yapa, are a group of Aboriginal Australians defined by their Warlpiri language, although not all still speak it. There are 5,000–6,000 Warlpiri, living mostly in a few towns and settlements scattered through their traditional land in the Northern Territory, north and west of Alice Springs (Mparntwe). About 3,000 people still speak the Warlpiri language. The word "Warlpiri" has also been romanised as Walpiri, Walbiri, Elpira, Ilpara, and Wailbri.

== Language ==
The Warlpiri language is a member of the Ngumpin-Yapa subgroup of the Pama-Nyungan family of languages. The name Yapa comes from the word for "person", and is also used by the Warlpiri people to refer to themselves, as Indigenous people rather than "kardiya" (non-Indigenous). (Note: yapa means 'black Aboriginal person' now, as opposed to kardiya, white man.)

The closest relative to Warlpiri is Warlmanpa. It has four main dialects; Yuendumu Warlpiri, in the south-west, Willowra Warlpiri, in the central area, around the Lander River, the northern dialect, Lajamanu Warlpiri, and the eastern dialect Wakirti Warlpiri, spoken on the Hanson River. Most Warlpiri-speakers are bilingual or multilingual, English being their second, or perhaps third, fourth or fifth language. The younger generation of Warlpiri people at Lajamanu have developed a new language, light Warlpiri, based on an amalgamation of words and syntax from Warlpiri, English and Kriol. Many also speak other languages, such as Arrernte, Jaru, Western Desert Language, Warumungu.

The Warlpiri also have an extensive non-verbal language, namely Warlpiri Sign Language (Rdaka-rdaka) which is employed by recently bereaved women who may not speak aloud in Warlpiri itself. An important component of Warlpiri communication in these contexts, its users employ as many of 600 distinct signs.

Thus a sentence like ga (present tense) na (1) jani (am going) (2) jadidjara (3) (the north) gura (4) (towards binga (a long way)(5)-dju. (6) (emphatic)

Can be said with the same syntax, in gestures: '(1) touch chest/ (2) move right index finger/ (3) point north/ (4) with lips/ (5) click fingers (6) towards north.

Kenneth Hale, an American linguist, learned the Warlpiri language and was adopted by the tribe, who knew him as Jabanungga. On returning to the United States, he raised his twin sons, Caleb and Ezra, in the Warlpiri tongue, and Ezra delivered the eulogy at Hale's funeral in that language.

== Country ==
Warlpiri country is located in the Tanami Desert, east of the Northern Territory-Western Australia border, west of the Stuart Highway and Tennant Creek, and northwest of Alice Springs. Traditional Warlpiri territory has been estimated to cover some 53,000 square miles (140,000 km^{2}). Many Warlpiri people live in Alice Springs, Tennant Creek, Katherine, and the smaller towns of Central Australia. Their largest communities are at Lajamanu, Nyirripi, Yuendumu, Alekarenge and Wirlyajarrayi/Willowra.

Warlpiri traditional territory was resource-poor from the European perspective, and lay a considerable distance away from the main telegraph routes and highway infrastructure built by Europeans, a fact which meant they were not affected by these intrusive developments, allowing their culture to remain relatively intact and flourishing, unlike the Anmatyerre, the Kaytetye, Warumungu, Warlmanpa, Mudbura and Jingili peoples. One consequence of this is that by the 1980s the Warlpiri people had expanded their range, moving into the lands of the Anmatyerre as the latter's population dropped.

=== Joint land claim ===
On 21 August 1980 a land claim was submitted by 90 claimants on behalf of the Warlpiri, Kukatja And Ngarti peoples, as traditional owners, under the Aboriginal Land Rights (Northern Territory) Act 1976, for an area of about 2,340 square kilometres (900 sq mi). It was the 11th traditional land claim presented on behalf of Aboriginal traditional owners by the Central Land Council. The land borders on areas in which each of the languages – Ngarti, Warlpiri, and Kukatja – is dominant. People from the different language groups have been influenced by each other when residing at Balgo, Western Australia and Lajamanu, Northern Territory. The claim was presented at Balgo Mission. The recommendation handed down by Justice Sir William Kearney on 23 August 1985 and presented on 19 August 1986 was that "the whole of the claim area be granted to a Land Trust for the benefit of Aboriginals entitled by tradition to its use or occupation, whether or not the traditional entitlement is qualified as to place, time, circumstance, purpose or permission".

In 2007 the Warlpiri, as managers and guardians of the land, declared some 4 million hectares of Northern Tanami an Indigenous Protected Area (IPA) and this IPA was extended to the over 10 million hectares of the Southern Tanami in 2012.

== History of contact and study ==
Mervyn Meggitt was sent by his teacher A. P. Elkin to study the Warlpiri, and he stayed with them for over 18 months from 1953 to 1958. His research into their social system, Desert People: A Study of the Walbiri Aborigines of Australia, was published in 1962. In the mid 1970s, Diane Bell undertook detailed work of the lives of Warlpiri women, summed up in her Daughters of the Dreaming (1982). Liam Campbell, in his Darby: One hundred years of life in a changing culture, (2006) recorded the autobiography of one Warlpiri man, Darby Jampijinpa Ross, a centenarian who lived through the profound changes affecting his people throughout the 20th century, including the death of family in the Coniston massacre. In 2000, the French anthropologist Françoise Dussart published a major study of the interplay of gender roles in the ritual maintenance and transmission by yampurru, holders of both sexes of the big secrets, regarding the tales and ceremonies concerning the Warrlpiri Dreaming (Jukurrpa).

== The arts ==
Warlpiri people are known for their traditional dances and have given performances at major events. Singing and dancing are also used in Warlpiri culture for turning boys into men, curing sicknesses, childbirth, attacking enemies, and ensuring fertility. The Warlpiri also have many different religious ceremonies and events where they sing and dance.

Many Indigenous artists, particularly in the Papunya Tula organisation, are of Warlpiri descent. Warnayaka Art, in Lajamanu, Northern Territory, is owned by the artists, who create works across a range of traditional and contemporary art media. A small gallery displays the art, and some of the artists have been finalists in the National Aboriginal & Torres Strait Islander Art Award. In the past, Warlpiri artwork was created on wood and sand. Then later, the artwork was made on the body of Warlpiri people. Today the art is used in galleries to pass down tradition and laws to the next generation of the Warlpiri people.

== Kinship ==
Matrimoiety 1 (M1)				Matrimoiety 2 (M2)			
M1a	M1b	M1c	M1d	M2a	M2b	M2c	M2d
P1a	P2a	P3a	P4a	P1b	P2b	P3b	P4b

Semi-patrimoiety 1 (P1)		Semi-patrimoiety 2 (P2)		Semi-patrimoiety 3 (P3)		Semi-patrimoiety 4 (P4)	
P1a	P1b	P2a	P2b	P3a	P3b	P4a	P4b
M1a	M2a	M1b	M2b	M1c	M2c	M1d	M2d

Warlpiri people divide their relatives, and by extension the entire population, into eight named groups or subsections. These subsections are related to kinship, and determine one's family rights and obligations. The following is a brief sketch of how the subsection system relates to genealogy.

The subsections are divided into four semi-patrimoieties, each consisting of two subsections. One always belongs to the same semi-patrimoiety as one's father, but to the opposite subsection, so that men in a patriline will alternate between those two subsections.

The subsections are also divided into two matrimoieties, each consisting of four subsections. One always belongs to the same matrimoiety as one's mother, and women in a matriline will cycle through the four subsections of that matrimoiety.

The two subsections in a semi-patrimoiety always belong to opposite matrimoieties, and similarly, the four subsections of each matrimoiety are distributed among the four semi-patrimoieties. Each subsection is uniquely determined by which semi-patrimoiety and which matrimoiety it belongs to.

Female lines of descent in the two matrimoieties cycle through the semi-patrimoieties in opposite directions. The result is that one's mother's father's mother's father (MFMF) is of the same subsection as oneself.

Siblings always belong to the same subsection.

It follows from these rules that one must choose one's spouse from a particular subsection, and traditional Warlpiri disapprove of marriages that break this constraint. The correct subsection to marry from is that of one's maternal grandfather (though of course one seeks a spouse closer to one's own age).

The subsection system underlies all of traditional Warlpiri society, determining how Warlpiri people address and regard each other. Two members of the same subsection refer to each other as siblings, whether or not they actually have the same parent. Men in the same subsection as one's father (for example, one's father's male siblings) are called "father", and this practice is often followed even when Warlpiri people speak English. In the same way, most of the kinship terms in the Warlpiri language actually refer to subsection (or classificatory) relationships, not to literal genetic relationships.

Traditionally, the first thing one Warlpiri person wants to know about another is their subsection. Warlpiri people often address each other by subsection name rather than by personal name, and incorporate their subsection name into their English one, usually as a middle name. When Warlpiri people marry Europeans, they tend to extend the subsection system to their in-laws, starting with the assumption that the European spouse is of the correct subsection. Rather distant European relatives may find themselves classified as honorary uncles, nieces, grandparents, and so on. Warlpiri people will then try to make sure that further marriages with related Europeans will adhere to the marriage constraint.

The traditional taboo against familiarity between a man and his mother-in-law extends automatically to any man and woman whose subsections are those of man and mother-in-law.

The subsection system automatically prevents incest between siblings and any relatives closer than cousins. Cousins that are children of classificatory siblings (who may, by definition, also happen to be true siblings) of the same sex are themselves classificatory siblings, and may not marry; but children of classificatory siblings of the opposite sex are of the appropriate subsections for marriage, and marriage between so-called cross cousins is actually encouraged in traditional society. Where a couple are not merely classificatory cross-cousins but are true cross-cousins (i.e. their parents are actual siblings), marriage is generally frowned upon.

The eight subsections are interrelated in a pattern known in group theory as the order 8 dihedral group, D_{4}.

If a Warlpiri person has a second choice marriage, then any children they have take on two skin names: first, the skin name they would have adopted had the marriage been first choice; second, the skin name the second choice marriage implied. When asked what their skin name is, they often reply with the former, but may also additionally use the latter. (Observation made from a discussion with a young 'Japananga-Jupurulla'.)

In Warlpiri culture, widows are not forced to remarry and are a very important part of society.

== Employment ==
The Warlpiri people have had a hard time paying taxes much like other Indigenous people in Australia. The Australian Government created training programs in the early 2000s, originally to help the economy and prevent welfare-dependent Indigenous people; however, this had the effect of separating them from their culture.

Warlpiri people are known for their self-reliance and their close-knit society. They have their own radio show that not only connects the widely dispersed people, but connects them to the outside world, and allows the youth and women to have a voice.

Warlpiri people also now work with the U.S. based Newmont Mining Corporation. Newmont and the Warlpiri made a plan known as the Granites-Kurra Ten Year Plan. Because the Warlpiri people are allowing the Newmont Corporation to mine on their lands, this gives them more job opportunities. This plan also helps support Warlpiri education and strengthening governance structures.

The Walpiri Rangers, managed by the Central Land Council also manage their Country as part of the Southern Tanami Indigenous Protected Area.

== Notable people ==
- Rosie Nangala Fleming (1928-2015), artist
- Alma Nungarrayi Granites (1955-2017), artist
- Liam Jurrah (born 1988), Australian rules footballer for Australian Football League (AFL) club Melbourne.
- Dorothy Napangardi (1950s–2013), artist
- Liam Patrick (born 1988), Australian rules footballer for AFL club Gold Coast.
- Bess Price (born 1960), Indigenous activist and supporter of the Northern Territory Intervention.
- Jacinta Nampijinpa Price (born 1981), Senator for the Northern Territory representing the Country Liberal Party.
- Darby Jampijinpa Ross (1905 - 2005), artist
- Kumanjayi Walker (2000-2019), resident of Yuendumu who became subject of national and international news after his killing by police officer Zachary Rolfe, who was acquitted of murder in 2022
- Malcolm Jagamarra Maloney (born 1955), artist

== Alternative names ==
- Albura (Yankuntjatjarra exonym)
- Alpira, Elpira, Alpiri (Iliaura exonym)
- Ilpir(r)a
- Ilpira (Anmatjera and Aranda exonym)
- Ilpirra, Ulperra, Ilpara (Aranda exonym)
- Nambulatji (Ngalia exonym)
- Njambalatji (Djaru exonym)
- Wailbri (post-1945 European schooling orthography)
- Walbiri, Waljpiri, Waljbiri, Walpari, Wolperi
- Walbrai
- Walbri, Wolpirra, Warrabri
- Walmala
- Walmanba
- Wanaeka (Ngardi exonym)
- Wanajaga
- Wanajaka/Wanajeka (Djaru exonym)
- Waneiga
- Waringari (exonym insinuating they are cannibals)

Source: Tindale 1974, p. 237

== Sources ==
- Baarda, Frank (4 April 2012). "Language learning in Indigenous communities" (PDF). Hansard House of Representatives: 36.
- Beckett, Jeremy (April 2002). "Mervyn Meggitt, 1924–2004". The Australian Journal of Anthropology. 16 (1): 116–119. doi:10.1111/j.1835-9310.2005.tb00113.x.
- Bell, Diane (2002) [First published 1982]. Daughters of the Dreaming. Spinifex Press. ISBN 978-1-876-75615-4.
- Brooks, Sally (16 October 2016). "Warlpiri people unite under desert skies for epic Indigenous dance performance". ABC News.
- Campbell, Liam (2006). Darby: One hundred years of life in a changing culture. ABC Books. ISBN 978-0-733-31925-9.
- Dussart, Francoise (1992). "The Politics of Female Identity: Warlpiri Widows at Yuendumu". Ethnology. 31 (4): 337–350. doi:10.2307/3773425. ISSN 0014-1828. JSTOR 3773425. S2CID 141446403.
- Dussart, Françoise (2000). The Politics of Ritual in an Aboriginal Settlement: Kinship, Gender and the Currency of Knowledge. Smithsonian Institution Press. ISBN 978-1-560-98393-4.
- Hinkson, Melinda (August 2004). "What's in a Dedication? On Being a Warlpiri DJ". The Australian Journal of Anthropology. 15 (2): 143–162. doi:10.1111/j.1835-9310.2004.tb00249.x. S2CID 162135301.
- "History in Lajamanu, Northern Territory". n.d.
- Holmes, Pamela (2008). "Dignity through change: how continence matters". Working with Older People. 12 (2): 23–25. doi:10.1108/13663666200800027. ISSN 1366-3666.
- Hoogenraad, R. (2009). "Walpiri". In Brown, Keith; Ogilvie, Sarah (eds.). Concise Encyclopedia of Languages of the World. Elsevier. pp. 1165–1168. ISBN 978-0-080-87775-4.
- Kearney, William J. (19 August 1986). Warlpiri Kukatja and Ngarti land claim: Report by Aboriginal Land Commissioner. Parliamentary Paper No. 191/1986. The Parliament of the Commonwealth of Australia. ISBN 978-0-644-04273-4 – via Trove.
- Kendon, Adam (1988). Sign Languages of Aboriginal Australia. Cambridge University Press. ISBN 978-0-521-36008-1.
- Lawrence, Rebecca (2005). "Governing Warlpiri Subjects: Indigenous Employment and Training Programs in the Central Australian Mining Industry". Geographical Research. 43 (1): 40–48. doi:10.1111/j.1745-5871.2005.00291.x. ISSN 1745-5863.
- Meggitt, Mervyn (September–December 1954). "Sign Language among the Walbiri of Central Australia". Oceania. 25 (1/2): 2–16. doi:10.1002/j.1834-4461.1954.tb00620.x. JSTOR 40328952.
- Napaljarri, Peggy Rockman; Cataldi, Lee (2003) [First published 1994]. Warlpiri Dreamings and Histories. Rowman Altamira. ISBN 978-0-761-98992-9.
- "Protected areas". Central Land Council. 2023.
- O'Shannessy, Carmel (April 2005). "Light Warlpiri: A New Language". Australian Journal of Linguistics. 25 (1): 31–57. doi:10.1080/07268600500110472. hdl:11858/00-001M-0000-0013-1E65-7. S2CID 62594617.
- Peterson, Nicolas (n.d.). "Warlpiri". Encyclopedia.com.
- Poirier, Sylvie (2002). "Review of Dussart 2000" (PDF). Anthropologie et Sociétés. 26 (2/3): 273–275. doi:10.7202/007067ar.
- Simpson, J. (2012). Warlpiri Morpho-Syntax: A Lexicalist Approach. Springer Science & Business Media. ISBN 978-9-401-13204-6.
- Tindale, Norman Barnett (1974). "Walpiri (NT)". Aboriginal Tribes of Australia: Their Terrain, Environmental Controls, Distribution, Limits, and Proper Names. Australian National University Press. ISBN 978-0-708-10741-6.
- "Warlpiri dancers to showcase Australia's common ground". National Indigenous Times. 4 October 2016.
- "The Warlpiri People and Newmont Mining". Austrade.
- "Warlpiri, Kukatja and Ngarti Land Claim". Central Land Council. March 1987. Archived from the original on 20 October 2020. "[From] Land Rights News Vol 2, No 2, March 1987"
- "Warnayaka Aboriginal Art Gallery, Australian Art At Its Best". Warnayaka. n.d.
- Walsh, Michael (1997). "How many Australian languages were there?". In Tryon, Darrell; Walsh, Michael (eds.). Boundary rider: essays in honour of Geoffrey O'Grady. Research School of Pacific and Asian Studies. pp. 393–412.
- "Yuendumu Community". Whole of Community Engagement Initiative. 2015.
