= Ngarrkic languages =

Pama–Nyungan language family of Australia

Ngarrkic
- Yapa
- Geographic distribution: Central Australia
- Linguistic classification: Pama–Nyungan: Ngumpin–Yapa; Ngarrkic
- Subdivisions: Warlmanpa; Warlpiri

Language codes
- Glottolog: ngar1289
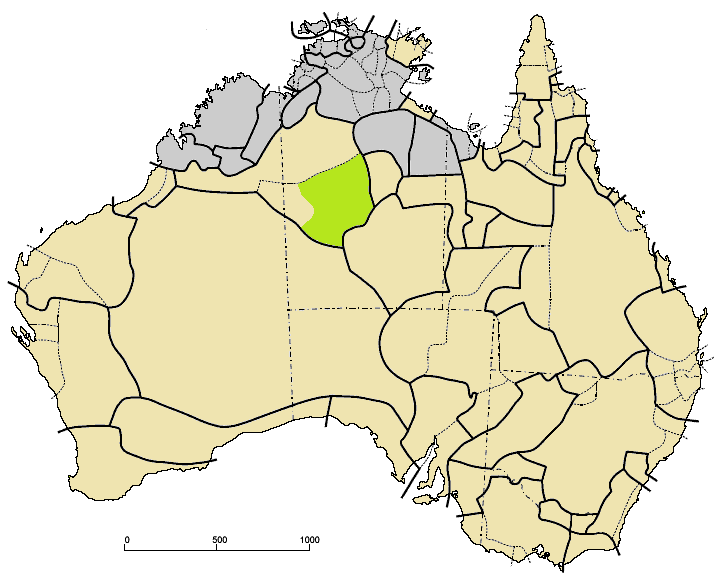
- Ngarrkic languages (green) among other Pama–Nyungan (tan).

The Ngarrkic (Ngarrga) or Yapa languages are a small language family of Central Australia, consisting of the two closely related languages Warlmanpa and the more populous Warlpiri.

The family was named after the common word for initiated man in the member languages, ngarrka (Aboriginal pronunciation: [ˈŋarɡa]). Ngarrga is an older spelling. In about 2000 an alternate name was suggested, yapa, based on the word for aboriginal man in the two languages.

In 2004 it was demonstrated that Ngarrkic is related to the neighbouring Ngumpin languages.
