= Umpithamu =

Aboriginal Australian people

The Umpithamu, also once known to ethnographers as the Koko Ompindamo, are a contemporary Aboriginal Australian people of the eastern Cape York Peninsula in northern Queensland. Norman Tindale, transcribing their ethnonym Umpithamu as Umbindhamu, referred to them as a horde of the Barungguan.

They are one of several Lamalama peoples.

== Language ==
The Umpithamu language belongs to the Paman subgroup of the Pama–Nyungan languages. By the early 2000s, there were only two completely fluent speakers of Umpithamu, one of them being Florrie Bassani. In July 2020, A Dictionary of Umpithamu was published, compiled by Flemish linguist Jean-Christophe Verstraete, with main language consultants Florrie Bassani and her niece Joan Liddy.

== People and country ==
The Umpithamu were the southernmost group of the Kawadji or "sandbeach peoples" (in Umpithamu ma-yaandhimunu or "people who own the sandbeach".), followed in order to their north, by the Yintyingka, the Umpila, the Pontunj (Yankonyu) the Pakadji(Koko Yao) and the Otati(Wuta(h)i). Their territory embraced an estimated 700 square miles (1,800 km^{2}) on the western coastline of Princess Charlotte Bay with its northern limits around Cape Sidmouth.

== History ==
For some years in the 1950s a cattle station owner in Umpithamu territory had been complaining of the presence of this Aboriginal people on his grazing lands, and after successful lobbying, he managed to have them removed in 1961. The Umpithamu were deported, reportedly by a ruse that deceived them, by the local police from their home country around Port Stewart to the Aboriginal reserve near Bamaga, 400 km (250 mi) to their north. After decades they eventually managed to return south, to Coen, a mere 70 mi (110 km) from their tribal centre. Since then they have managed to set up three outstations in the Port Stewart area.

They form one of the several peoples composing the Lama Lama people.

== Alternative names ==
- Baka (Kaantjuu term)
- Banjigam (Bakanambia term)
- Barungguan
- Ganganda
- Njindingga
- Umbuigamu/Umbindhamu
- Yintjingga (native name of a place at mouth of Stewart River)

Source: Tindale 1974

== Sources ==
- Rigsby, Bruce; Chase, Athol (2014). "The Sandbeach People and Dugong hunters of Eastern Cape York Peninsula: property in land and sea country". In Peterson, Nicolas; Rigsby, Bruce (eds.). Customary marine tenure in Australia. Sydney University Press. pp. 307–350. ISBN 978-1-743-32389-2.
- Thomson, Donald F. (1933). "The Hero Cult, Initiation and Totemism on Cape York". The Journal of the Royal Anthropological Institute of Great Britain and Ireland. 63: 453–537. doi:10.2307/2843801. JSTOR 2843801.
- Tindale, Norman Barnett (1974). "Barungguan (QLD)". Aboriginal Tribes of Australia: Their Terrain, Environmental Controls, Distribution, Limits, and Proper Names. Australian National University Press. ISBN 978-0-708-10741-6. Archived from the original on 1 March 2017.
- Verstraete, Jean-Christophe; De Cock, Barbara (April 2008). "Construing Confrontation: Grammar in the Construction of a Key Historical Narrative in". Language in Society. 37 (2): 217–240. doi:10.1017/s0047404508080275. JSTOR 20108123. S2CID 144744258.
