= Athol Kennedy Chase =

Australian anthropologist and ethnographer (1936–2020)

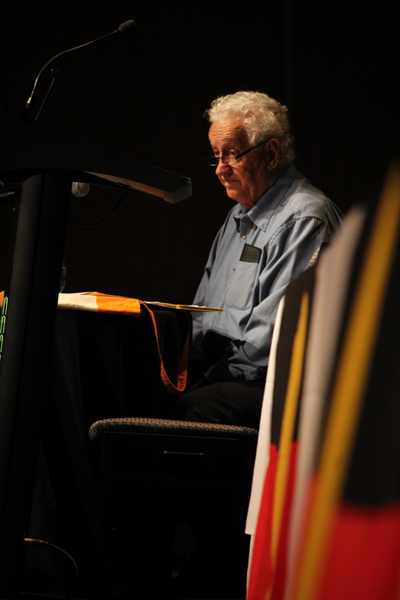
- Anthropologist Athol Chase, May 2017
- Born: 17 April 1936; Rockhampton City, Queensland
- Died: 26 November 2020 (aged 84); Wesley Hospital Brisbane, Queensland
- Occupations: Anthropologist and University Lecturer
- Years active: 1971 to 2020
- Known for: Lockhart River Peoples Ethnography, Applied Anthropology, and Recording of Cultural Continuity & Change

Athol Kennedy Chase (17 April 1936 – 26 November 2020) was an Australian anthropologist and ethnographer who undertook extensive fieldwork in Cape York Peninsula, recording and especially making a cultural record of the traditions, cultural change, and cultural continuities of the Aboriginal Peoples living at Lockhart River, Queensland including cultural mapping for the Umpila, Koko Yao, Wuthathi and Kaantju.

Following almost 50 years from first doing fieldwork in Lockhart River, his life's works and contribution to Lockhart River was summarized by Lockhart River community as follows:

"When Killoran tried to do the wrong thing, he was there for us; when Farndale tried to build a big resort on Line Hill, he was there for us; when the mining companies tried to make us let them mine at Rocky Point and Wuthathi country, he was there for us; when government wanted to build a spaceport on Kuuku Ya’u country, he was there for us; and when we needed him to stand up for our Native Title with the information our old people gave him, he was there for us. Without his work with our old people, it would have been much harder to get our land back. He has been a warrior for us all".
