= Cape York International Spaceport =

Proposed spaceport in Australia

Map of the Cape York Peninsula in Australia's Far North Queensland, where the spaceport was proposed to be built.

The Cape York International Spaceport was an abandoned 20th century proposal to build the world's first commercial spaceport in Australia's Cape York Peninsula. The plan was announced in 1986 by then-Queensland Premier Joh Bjelke-Petersen, who confiscated Indigenous Australian land in Far North Queensland for the spaceport's construction. The location was chosen due to its proximity to the Equator, which would allow easier and cheaper space launches. Following legal challenges from local indigenous groups whose land had been taken for the project, increased federal environmental standards and a lack of financial support from the private sector, the project was abandoned in 1992.

== Later developments ==
In 2017 Premier Annastacia Palaszczuk returned the 160,730 hectares of Cape York land, known as Bromley, to its Wuthathi, Kuuku Ya'u and Northern Kaantju traditional owners.

Following the establishment of the Australian Space Agency and increasing interest from governments around Australia in the space industry, in 2018 the Queensland Government began a feasibility study to consider suitable locations for a satellite launch facility. The assessment criteria balance considerations of airspace, operations, environment and cultural matters (including local Aboriginal and Torres Strait Islander views).

In 2018 Cook Shire mayor Peter Scott recommended the nearby town of Weipa to build a spaceport due to its sea port, population size and proximity to RAAF Base Scherger.

By 2020, the Queensland Government announced it would investigate the suitability of Abbot Point as an alternative orbital launch site. The Opposition Liberal National Party unveiled alternative proposals for a facility in Bowen before the 2020 Queensland state election, which it lost.

== See also ==
- Space industry
- National Space Program
- Australian Space Agency
