= Uutaalnganu =

Aboriginal Australian people

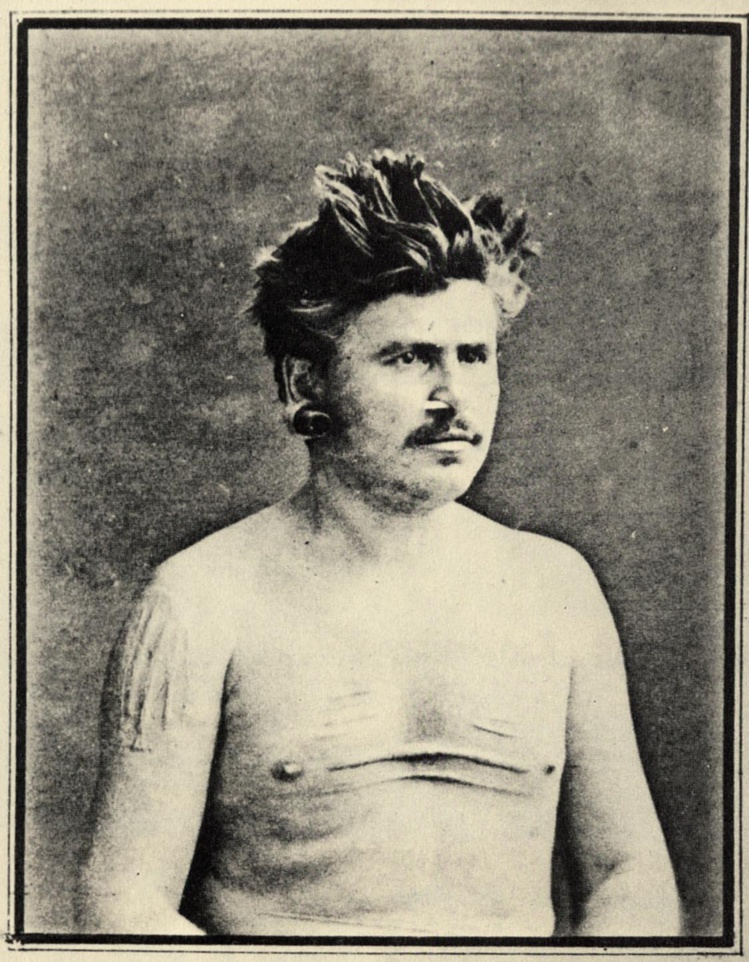
Narcisse Pelletier wearing traditional Uutalnganu body decoration

The Uutaalnganu people, also known as Night Island Kawadji, are an Aboriginal Australian group of Cape York Peninsula in northern Queensland. The name is also used collectively for several peoples in this area, such as the Pontunj / Jangkonj (Yanganyu), whose language is unconfirmed.

== Name ==
Kawadji formerly referred to a people who inhabited Night Island and the coastal strip opposite. It now refers primarily to a modern aggregation of six peoples, collectively known by the same ethnonym kawadji which means "people of the sandbeach" (pama malnkana). These groups, the Umpithamu/Koko Ompindamo, Pakadji, Yintyingka, Otati, Umpila and Pontunj are the traditional owners and users of the coastal areas east of the Great Dividing Range of northeastern Cape York from Oxford Bay to Princess Charlotte Bay.

== History ==
The traditional Kawadji of Night Island were a small population and intermarried with clans of the mainland Barungguan.

The Night Island Kawadji were known for their skill in building and then employing double-outrigger wooden canoes (tango) in adventurous voyages to outlying reefs where they would hunt for dugong, turtles, and the eggs of both sea birds and turtles.

Narcisse Pelletier survived a shipwreck of a French merchantman Saint Paul in 1858, when he was abandoned by the crew. He was taken in by the Kawadji/Pama Malngkana, with linguistic and other evidence pointing to the area of the Uutaalnganu. He stayed with them for 17 years.

== Language ==
The Night Island Kawadji spoke, according to Norman Tindale, Yankonyu, a dialect of the Umpila language spoken by the Umpila and Pontunj, to whom they were closely related.

== Native title ==
On 25 November 2021, 986 km^{2} (381 sq mi) of land on the eastern side of the Cape York Peninsula was handed back to the people, at the same time as 1,202 km^{2} (464 sq mi) was awarded to the Kuuku Ya'u peoples, in a native title claim that was lodged seven years prior. The landmark ruling was delivered by Justice Debra Mortimer of the Federal Court of Australia, sitting at the Supreme Court of Queensland in Cairns.

== Alternative names ==
The following alternative names refer to the original people of Night Island:

- Kawadji (This term was also an exonym used by the Kaantju and other tribes within the interior, bearing the general sense of 'east' (kawai).)
- Night Island people

Names of other peoples also called Kawadji:

- Mälnkänidji (formed from malqkan (beach) and -idja (a suffix meaning 'belonging to'))
- Jangkonju (a name for their language, shared by the Pontunj)
- Yankonyu

== Sources ==
- Haddon, A. C. (2011) [First published 1935]. Reports of the Cambridge Anthropological Expedition to Torres Straits. Vol. 1. Cambridge University Press. ISBN 978-0-521-17986-7.
- Hale, H. M.; Tindale, N.B. (1933). "Aborigines of Princess Charlotte Bay, North Queensland". Records of the South Australian Museum. 5 (1). Adelaide: 64–116.
- Rigsby, Bruce; Chase, Athol (2014). "The Sandbeach People and Dugong hunters of Eastern Cape York Peninsula: property in land and sea country". In Peterson, Nicolas; Rigsby, Bruce (eds.). Customary marine tenure in Australia. Sydney University Press. pp. 307–350. ISBN 978-1-743-32389-2.
- Sharp, R. Lauriston (March 1939). "Tribes and Totemism in North-East Australia". Oceania. 9 (3): 254–275. doi:10.1002/j.1834-4461.1939.tb00232.x. JSTOR 40327744.
- Anderson, Stephanie (2018) [2009]. Pelletier: The Forgotten Castaway of Cape York. Melbourne Books. ISBN 978-1-922-12902-4.
- Thomson, Donald F. (1933). "The Hero Cult, Initiation and Totemism on Cape York". Royal Anthropological Institute of Great Britain and Ireland. 63: 453–537. doi:10.2307/2843801. JSTOR 2843801.
- Thomson, Donald F. (July–December 1934). "The Dugong Hunters of Cape York". Royal Anthropological Institute of Great Britain and Ireland. 64: 237–263. doi:10.2307/2843809. JSTOR 2843809.
- Tindale, Norman Barnett (1974). "Kawadji (QLD)". Aboriginal Tribes of Australia: Their Terrain, Environmental Controls, Distribution, Limits, and Proper Names. Australian National University Press. ISBN 978-0-708-10741-6. Archived from the original on 1 March 2017.
