= Naomi Hobson =

Australian artist

Naomi Hobson (born 1979) is an Aboriginal Australian artist of southern Kaantju and Umpila heritage from Lockhart River, Cape York Peninsula, Queensland. She works in many media, including painting, photography and ceramics. She started exhibiting in 2013.

Hobson was winner of the Alice Prize, a national prize for contemporary art, in 2016, and of the inaugural Cairns Indigenous Art Fair Photography Award in 2018, and has been a finalist in many other awards, including the Telstra National Aboriginal and Torres Strait Islander Art Awards.

== Early life and education ==
Hobson was born in 1979 at Lockhart River in Far North Queensland, and grew up in Coen in Far North Queensland, where the natural environment inspired her early artistic works. Her grandfather named her "Yikan", after the hoop pine that grows in the McIlwraith Ranges of the east coast of Cape York Peninsula.

Her grandfather was employed as a stockman for a white family. Her parents are both Aboriginal Australians: her mother is of southern Kaantju people and her father is Umpila. Her family has historically been involved in political and social reforms such as land rights, to return social and economic benefits to the traditional people of Coen. Hobson's art is an expression of her engagement in these reforms, by showing culture, country and identity in the artworks. Her inspiration is the richness of many cultures – village life influenced by the merging of traditional and popular culture, farming culture and the experience of the urban chaos of South East Asia.

Hobson studied various courses at different colleges of further education:

- Certificate III in Multimedia, Tropical North Queensland Institute of TAFE, Cairns, 2002
- Multimedia studies Canberra Institute of Technology, 2005
- Mainstream Visual Arts, Tropical North Queensland Institute of TAFE, Cairns, 2007

== Career ==
Hobson began her artistic career in 2007.

From 2013 until (?) she has held a solo exhibition each year. A first ever solo exhibition, I am Yikan, took its name from her indigenous name, and was an exploration of self identity through bright layers of colour and depictions of the landscape of Cape York. The exhibition at Alcaston Gallery in Fitzroy, was a sold out show and it was opened by Minister Tony Burke who was at the time the Minister for Arts. The exhibition ran from 4 to 28 June 2013. Naomi Hobson is a regular exhibitor at the Cairns Indigenous Art Fair.

In 2016 Hobson began working in photography by documenting her clan members as they worked on their traditional lands.

In 2018 her first international exhibition, New Beginnings, was held in Singapore's Redot Fine Art Gallery.

Hobson is represented by two galleries, the Redot Art Gallery in Singapore and the Vivien Anderson Gallery in Melbourne.

== Style, media and themes ==
Hobson is a visual artist who works in a range of media, including painting, photography and ceramics. She is known for her contemporary artworks full of vibrant colour and dynamic intricate shapes which imitate nature. Hobson paints her father's country of the East coastal regions of Cape York Northern Queensland. Hobson's visual art is an abstract interpretation of her culture and the social and political history of her family and the ancestors before her. She lives and works in the small township of Coen (population 300), where her family connection is strong. The geographical features of the region including the contours of the McIlwraith Range, the ocean and waterways are prominent in her paintings.

== Exhibitions ==
- 2013 – I am Yikan – Alcaston Gallery, Fitzroy, Victoria. The first solo exhibition of Hobson's work explores her connection to her traditional land of the McIlwraith Range, near Coen in far north Queensland.
- 2014 – Seven Sisters and the Bonefish Story – Depot II, facilitated by Alcaston Gallery, Sydney, NSW.
- 2015 – Ngaachi Ngunama – Story Place – Alcaston Gallery, Vic.
- 2016 – Kanichi on Top People – Alcaston Gallery, Vic.
- 2017 – Time and Place: Naomi Hobson – Art Mob Aboriginal Fine Art, Hobart, Tas.; Alcaston Gallery, Vic.
- 2018 – Times Have Changed – Suzanne O'Connell Gallery. This exhibition depicted how her father's country had deteriorated due to the effects of climate change. It raised awareness of the social and environmental changes related to global warming, climate change and dispossession.
- 2018 – New Beginnings - Redot Fine Art Gallery, Singapore, Hobson's first international exhibition.
- 2019 – Body Politics: Contemporary Works from the Collection at Bendigo Art Gallery showcased works from Hobson's 2018 photographic series Warriors without a Weapon, consisting of portraits of Indigenous men.
- 2019 and 2020/21 – Adolescent Wonderland, at the Cairns Art Gallery in 2019 and as part of Tarnanthi at the Art Gallery of South Australia in 2020/21. A photographic series depicting the fusion of Indigenous and popular culture in Coen, as expressed by adolescents, who chose their own poses for the photographs as she strolled through the town.

== Collections ==
- National Gallery of Australia, Canberra, Yinyalma (2012)
- Queensland Art Gallery of Modern Art (QAGOMA)
- Museum and Art Gallery of the Northern Territory
- Art Gallery of South Australia, Adolescent Wonderland (photographic series, 2019), and others
- National Gallery of Victoria
- Museum of Contemporary Art Australia in Sydney
- State Library of Queensland

== Awards ==
=== Winner ===
- The Alice Prize, a national prize for contemporary art held since 1970, 39th edition, 2016, held by the Araluen Arts Centre in Alice Springs, for her painting "High Pine"(2015)
- Inaugural Cairns Indigenous Art Fair 2018 Photography Award

=== Finalist ===
- Sunshine Coast Art Prize
- Geelong Contemporary Art Prize
- Gold Coast Art Prize 2013, 2014
- 31st Telstra National Torres Strait Islander & Aboriginal Art Awards (NATSIAA), 2014, 2015, 2016

== Personal life ==
Hobson still resides on the riverbed where her grandparents were born. Her home is an old tin shed that was once the village church.

== Controversy ==
On May 23, 2026, Hobson, as a director of Kalan Enterprises, was charged with five counts of fraud, and two counts of producing or using false records, in relation to a Queensland Police Service investigation into alleged misuse of Aboriginal corporation funds. She was one of four people charged following a five-year investigation.
