= Pontunj =

Aboriginal Australian people

The Pontunj, also called the Yankonyu, are a contemporary Indigenous Australian people of the eastern Cape York Peninsula in northern Queensland.

== Country ==
The Pontunj overlap with the Kawadji, of which Yankonyu is considered by Norman Tindale to be an alternative name, though he treats the Pontunj as distinct from the Kawadji people of Night Island and the coastal stretch opposite. Their territory covered some 300 sq. miles, running from Cape Weymouth southwards to the coast just to the north of Night Island and to the Lockhart River and Lloyd Bay areas.

== Alternative names ==
- Jangkonju
- Yankonya

== Notes and references ==
=== References ===
- Haddon, A. C. (2011) [First published 1935]. Reports of the Cambridge Anthropological Expedition to Torres Strait. Vol. 1. Cambridge University Press. ISBN 978-0-521-17986-7.
- Rigsby, Bruce; Chase, Athol (2014). "The Sandbeach People and Dugong hunters of Eastern Cape York Peninsula: property in land and sea country". In Peterson, Nicolas; Rigsby, Bruce (eds.). Customary marine tenure in Australia. Sydney University Press. pp. 307–350. ISBN 978-1-743-32389-2.
- Thomson, Donald F. (1933). "The Hero Cult, Initiation and Totemism on Cape York". Royal Anthropological Institute of Great Britain and Ireland. 63: 453–537. doi:10.2307/2843801. JSTOR 2843801.
- Tindale, Norman Barnett (1974). "Pontunj (QLD)". Aboriginal Tribes of Australia: Their Terrain, Environmental Controls, Distribution, Limits, and Proper Names. Australian National University Press. ISBN 978-0-708-10741-6.
