= Umpila =

Aboriginal Australian people of Queensland

The Umpila people are an Aboriginal Australian people of the eastern Cape York Peninsula in northern Queensland. The majority of the remnant of the Umpila now live in Lockhart.

== Language ==
Umpila is classified as one of the North Cape York Paman languages. It is one of 6 dialects which are often collectively referred to as Umpila, and, though classified as moribund, it is still spoken by elders, along with Kuuku Ya'u/Koko Yao and Kaantju, and efforts are being made to revitalize it. The process of reduplication in Umpila is used for the progressive aspect, creating forms that are "bewilderingly varied".

== Country ==
Umpila country has been called 'one of the most ecologically intact indigenous domains on earth.' It stretches over some 300 square miles (780 km^{2}) around Cape Sidmouth north to Night Island, and to the Chester River. (Note: From Hale and Tindale's 1927 survey of the area, the authors stated that, at that time:'The Ompeila range from Rocky River () northward to the Nisbet River. Some of their main camps are on the Rocky River, and a permanent lagoon one mile north of the mouth of the river is also an important camping ground' (Hale & Tindale 1933, p. 70)) Their territory is very rich in its biodiversity heritage, with some 260 plant species unique to their region. To their north were the Uutaalnganu, while their southern borders ran up to those of the Lama Lama.

== History ==
The Umpila were forcibly removed from their land in the 1940s. Most now live in the Lockhart River Community.

== Society ==
The Umpila call themselves Umpila pama malngkanichi, "people of the sand beach", a term which refers to their belonging to the ethnocultural group of Kawadji of north-eastern Queensland coastal dwellers. Their society had two exogamous patrimoieties, kaapay (karrpiya/ karpeya) and kuyan (koiyan), two terms which are also used to classify flora and fauna. The two patrimoieties marry their opposite moiety, resulting in the acquisition of the resulting children to the father's moiety.

Strict rules also govern social interaction between certain grades of affine relationship. Two of the most knowledgeable informants, the tribal elder Horace Rocky and the young park ranger Johanne Omeenyo cannot speak to each other, since a classificatory nephew like Johanne is forbidden to speak directly to his 'uncle', and they must use clan intermediaries.

== Native title ==
The descendants of the Umpila people had their rights to native title recognised by a Federal Court decision in 2008. They were recognised as custodians of 1,200 square kilometres (460 mi^{2}) and as freehold owners of half of this land.

== Some words ==
- pulpanchi (red) (Note: Umpila as a dialect group has only three colour terms (Hill 2011, pp. 57–58))
- pulpichi (white)
- thungkuthungku (black)

== Alternative names ==
- Koko-umpilo
- Ompeila Ompela, Oombilla

Source: Tindale 1974, p. 184

== Sources ==
- "AIATSIS map of Indigenous Australia". AIATSIS. 28 July 2023.
- Baker, Brett (2014). "Word structure in Australian Languages". In Koch, Harold; Nordlinger, Rachel (eds.). The Languages and Linguistics of Australia: A Comprehensive Guide. Walter de Gruyter. pp. 139–214. ISBN 978-3-110-27977-1.
- Hale, H. M.; Tindale, N.B. (1933). "Aborigines of Princess Charlotte Bay, North Queensland". Records of the South Australian Museum. 5 (1). Adelaide: 64–116.
- Hill, Clair (2011). "Named and Unnamed Spaces: Color, Kin, and the Environment in Umpila" (PDF). The Senses and Society. 6 (1): 57–67. doi:10.2752/174589311X12893982233759. hdl:11858/00-001M-0000-0012-BB46-1. S2CID 36929789.
- Hill, Clair; McConvell, Patrick (2010). "Emergency language documentation teams: The Cape York Peninsula experience". In Hobson, John; Lowe, Kevin; Poetsch, Susan; Walsh, Michael (eds.). Re-awakening languages: Theory and practice in the revitalisation of Australia's Indigenous languages. Sydney University Press. pp. 418–432. ISBN 978-1-920-89955-4. Archived from the original on 30 October 2017.
- Hooton, Amanda (22 November 2014). "Umpila country – the land of the living". The Sydney Morning Herald.
- McConnel, Ursula H. (September 1939). "Social Organization of the Tribes of Cape York Peninsula, North Queensland". Oceania. 10 (1): 54–72. doi:10.1002/j.1834-4461.1939.tb00256.x. JSTOR 40327744.
- McConnel, Ursula H. (June 1940). "Social Organization of the Tribes of Cape York Peninsula, North Queensland (Continued)". Oceania. 10 (4): 434–455. doi:10.1002/j.1834-4461.1940.tb00305.x. JSTOR 40327867.
- Meadows, Michael (2001). Voices in the Wilderness: Images of Aboriginal People in the Australian Media. Greenwood Publishing Group. ISBN 978-0-313-31566-4.
- Rigsby, Bruce; Chase, Athol (2014). "The Sandbeach People and Dugong hunters of Eastern Cape York Peninsula: property in land and sea country". In Peterson, Nicolas; Rigsby, Bruce (eds.). Customary marine tenure in Australia. Sydney University Press. pp. 307–350. ISBN 978-1-743-32389-2.
- Sharp, R. Lauriston (May 1939a). "Tribes and Totemism in North-East Australia". Oceania. 9 (3): 254–275. doi:10.1002/j.1834-4461.1939.tb00232.x. JSTOR 40327744.
- Sharp, R. Lauriston (June 1939b). "Tribes and Totemism in North-East Australia (Continued)". Oceania. 9 (4): 439–461. doi:10.1002/j.1834-4461.1939.tb00248.x. JSTOR 40327762.
- Thomson, Donald F. (July–December 1933). "The Hero Cult, Initiation and Totemism on Cape York". Journal of the Royal Anthropological Institute of Great Britain and Ireland. 63: 453–537. doi:10.2307/2843801. JSTOR 2843801.
- Thomson, Donald F. (July–December 1934). "The Dugong Hunters of Cape York". Journal of the Royal Anthropological Institute of Great Britain and Ireland. 64: 237–263. doi:10.2307/2843809. JSTOR 2843809.
- Tindale, Norman Barnett (1974). "Ombila (QLD)". Aboriginal Tribes of Australia: Their Terrain, Environmental Controls, Distribution, Limits, and Proper Names. Australian National University Press. ISBN 978-0-708-10741-6. Archived from the original on 1 March 2017.
