= Umpila language =

Aboriginal Australian language

Umpila
- Northeastern Paman
- Native to: Australia
- Region: Cape York Peninsula, Queensland
- Ethnicity: Umpila, Pakadji, Kaantju, Uutaalnganu (Kawadji)
- Native speakers: 12 (2005)
- Language family: Pama–Nyungan: Paman; North Cape York; Umpila
- Signed forms: Umpila Sign Language

Language codes
- ISO 639-3: Variously: kbe – Kanju kuy – Kuuku-Yaʼu ump – Umpila
- Glottolog: nort2759
- AIATSIS: Y45 Umpila, Y211 Uutaalnganu, Y169 Kuuku Iʼyu
- ELP: Umpila
- Kuuku-Ya'u
- Kaanju
- Kuuku Ya'u is classified as Critically Endangered by the UNESCO Atlas of the World's Languages in Danger.

- Umpila is classified as Severely Endangered by the UNESCO Atlas of the World's Languages in Danger.

Umpila, also known as Ompeila, Ompela, Oom-billa, or Koko-umpilo, is an Aboriginal Australian language, or dialect cluster, of the Cape York Peninsula in northern Queensland. It is spoken by about 100 Aboriginal people, many of them elderly.

== Geographic distribution ==
The land territory associated with the Umpila language group is located along the northeastern coast of Cape York Peninsula and stretches from the northern end of Temple Bay south to the Massey Creek region at the top of Princess Charlotte Bay, and west of the Great Dividing Range towards the township of Coen. Most of the remaining Umpila and Kuuku Ya'u speakers reside in Lockhart River Aboriginal Community, which is located at Lloyd Bay, roughly at the boundary between Umpila and Kuuku Ya'u lands.

== Varieties ==
The chief varieties of Umpila, variously considered dialects or distinct languages, are:

- Umpila proper
- Kanju (Kandju, Kaantyu, Gandju, Gandanju, Kamdhue, Kandyu, Kanyu, Karnu), also Jabuda, Neogulada, Yaldiye-Ho
- Kuuku-Yaʼu (Yaʼo, Koko-Jaʼo, Kokoyao), also Bagadji (Pakadji)
- Kuuku Yani (extinct)
- Uutaalnganu (extinct)
- Kuuku Iʼyu (extinct)

== Phonology ==
Consonant inventory
	Labial	Dental	Alveolar/ Retroflex	Palatal	Velar	Glottal
Plosive	p	t̪	t	c	k	ʔ
Nasal	m	n̪	n	ɲ	ŋ	
Lateral			l			
Rhotic			r			
Approximant			ɻ	j	w	

- /c/ may also be pronounced as [ɟ].

Vowel inventory
	Front	Back
High	i iː	u uː
Low	a aː	

== Grammar ==
Typologically, Umpila is an agglutinative, suffixing, dependent-marking language, with a preference for Subject-Object-Verb constituent order. Grammatical relations are indicated by a split ergative case system: nominal inflections are ergative/absolutive, pronominals are nominative/accusative. Features of note include: historical dropping of initial consonants, complex verbal reduplication expressing progressivity and habitual aspect, 'optional' ergative marking.

== Sign language ==
The Umpila have (or had) a well-developed signed form of their language. It is one of the primary components of Far North Queensland Indigenous Sign Language.

== See also ==
- Avoidance speech

== Bibliography ==
- Chase, A. K. 1979. Cultural Continuity: Land and Resources among East Cape York Aborigines. In Stevens, N. C. and Bailey, A. (eds). Contemporary Cape York Peninsula. Canberra: Australian Institute of Aboriginal Studies.
- Chase, A. K. 1980. Which way now? Tradition, continuity and change in a north Queensland Aboriginal Community. Unpublished PhD thesis. Brisbane: University of Queensland.
- Chase, A. K. 1984. Belonging to Country: Territory, Identity and Environment in Cape York Peninsula, Northern Australia. In L.R. Hiatt (ed) Aboriginal Landowners: Contemporary issues in the determination of traditional Aboriginal land ownership. Sydney: Sydney University Press.
- Rigsby, B. and Chase, A. 1998. The Sandbeach People and Dugong Hunters of Eastern Cape York Peninsula: property in Land and Sea Country. Rigsby, B and Peterson, N. (eds) Customary Marine Tenure in Australia. Sydney. Oceania 48:192-218.
- Thompson, D. A. 1976. A Phonology of Kuuku-Ya'u. In Sutton, P. (ed.), Languages of Cape York, 213-235. Canberra: Australian Institute of Aboriginal Studies.
- Thompson, D. 1988. Lockhart River 'Sand Beach' Language: An Outline of Kuuku Ya'u and Umpila. Darwin: Summer Institute of Linguistics.
- Thomson, D. F. 1933. The Hero Cult, Initiation Totemism on Cape York. Royal Anthropological Institute Journal 63: 453-537.
- Thomson, D. F. 1934. Notes on a Hero Cult from the Gulf of Carpentaria, North Queensland. Royal Anthropological Institute Journal 64: 217-262.
