= Narcisse Pelletier =

French castaway (1844–1894)

Alphonse Narcisse Pierre Pelletier
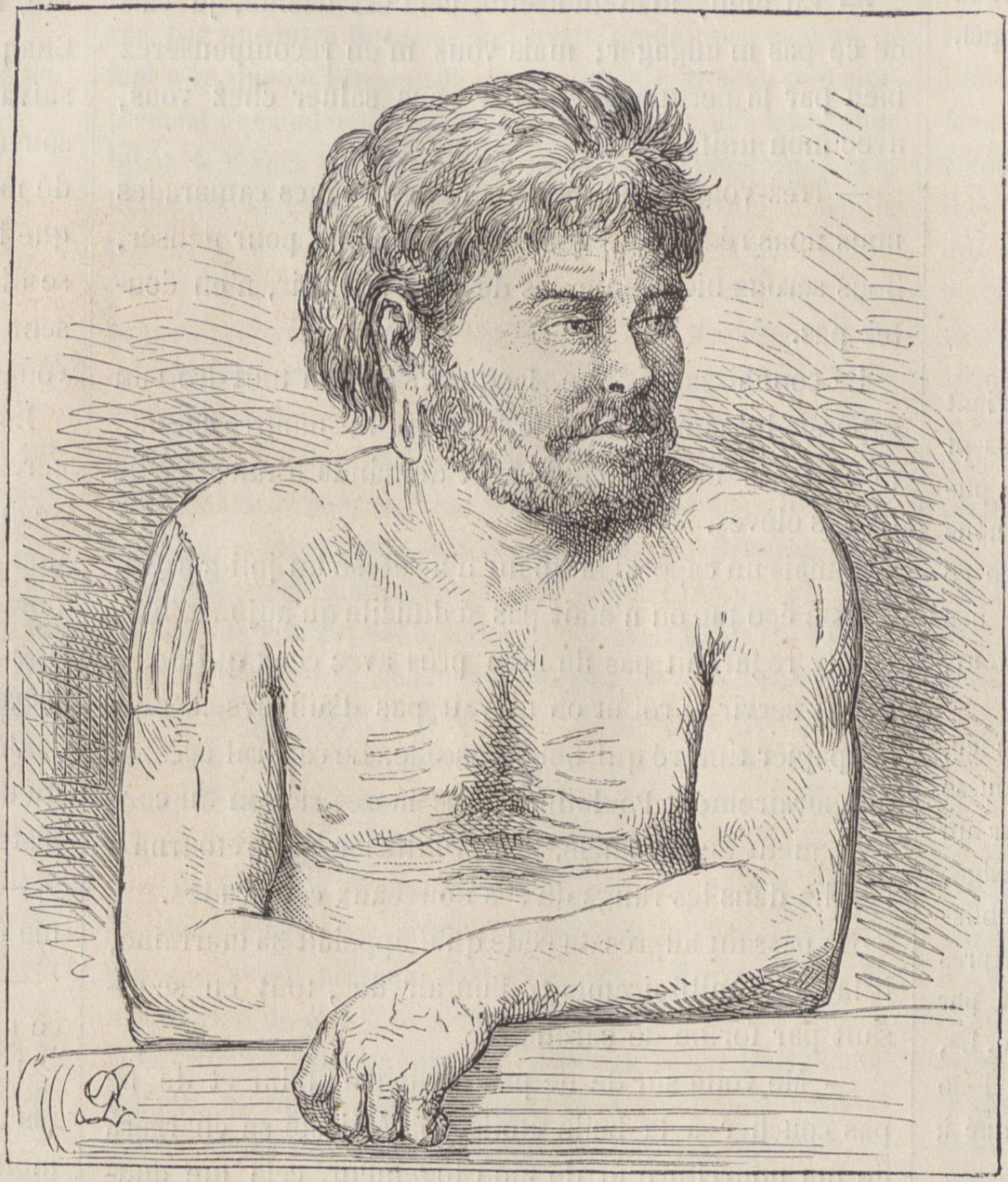
- Portrait of Narcisse Pelletier published in L'Univers illustré, 14 August 1875

Personal information
- Born: 1 January 1844 Saint-Gilles-Croix-de-Vie, Vendée, France
- Died: 28 September 1894 (aged 50) Saint-Nazaire, Loire-Atlantique, France
- Spouse: Louise Désirée Mabileau

Narcisse Pelletier (1 January 1844 – 28 September 1894), born in Saint-Gilles-Croix-de-Vie in the Vendée was a French sailor. He was abandoned in 1858 at the age of 14 on the Cape York Peninsula, in Australia, during the dry season (late September or early October). He was discovered and rescued by an Aboriginal family and went on to live with the Uutaalnganu. They adopted Narcisse who they named Amglo, for the next 17 years, until he was found by the crew of the John Bell on 11 April 1875.

== Biography ==
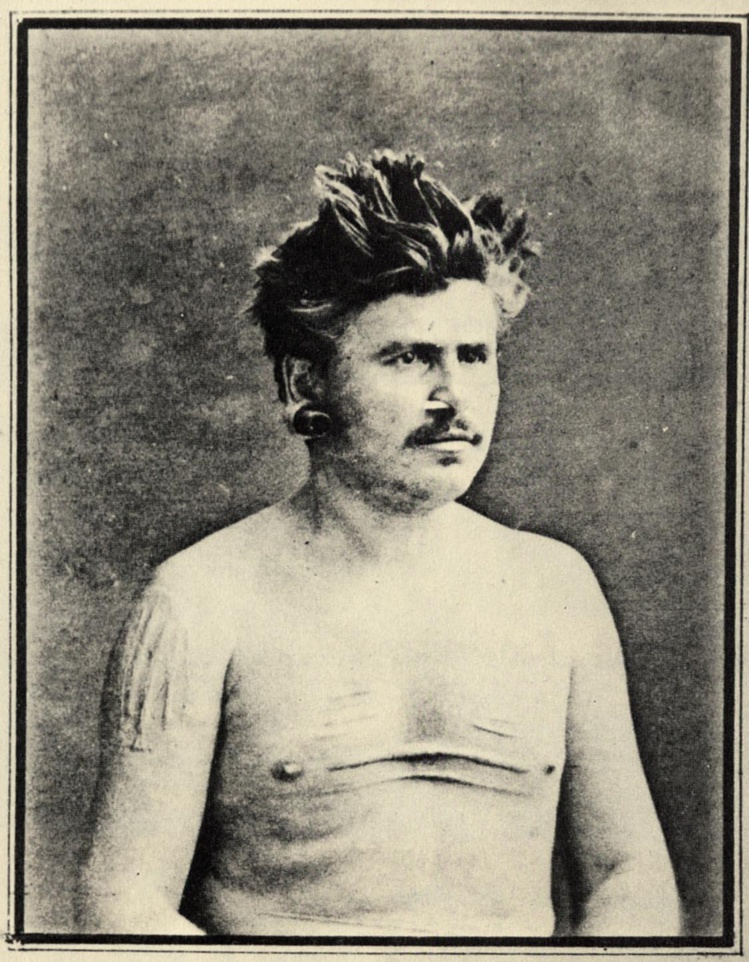
1876 photograph of Pelletier showing his cicatrices

In August 1857, Pelletier embarked from Marseille as a cabin boy on the Saint-Paul under the command of Captain Emmanuel Pinard. The ship left with a cargo of wine for Bombay and then headed on to Hong Kong where it picked up 317 Chinese labourers departing for work on the Australian goldfields.

Rations began to run short so the captain opted for a quicker, but more dangerous route to Sydney, sailing between the Solomon Islands and the Louisiade Archipelago, rather than travelling right around the Solomon Islands. The ship struck a reef off Rossel Island and all aboard landed on a tiny waterless island now known as Heron Island or Wolo, about a kilometre from the much larger Rossel Island. When a party was sent to Rossel Island to search for water, they were attacked and some men were killed or taken prisoner. Pelletier was hit by a rock and he and an apprentice were the only ones to escape after being picked up by the captain in a boat and returned to Heron Island. Here, they were attacked by men from Rossel, some swimming, some in canoes, but the attackers were driven off by firearms.

The captain and the remaining crew escaped in a longboat. The captain claimed later that he consulted with the Chinese, but Pelletier claimed he left at night without informing them, and he himself had to jump on board when he saw what was happening. Accounts vary, but there were between nine and twelve men aboard. They quickly ran short of supplies as most of the weapons and provisions had been left with the Chinese. They caught seabirds to eat and had to drink urine and seawater to survive on their 12-day journey across the Coral Sea in an open boat.

They landed just south of Cape Direction (referred to, wrongly, as Cape Flattery, in the early French account), on the eastern coast of Cape York Peninsula, after a journey of almost 1,200 kilometres (750 mi). Again, the accounts differ as to how Pelletier got left behind after they found water ashore, but he was later found by three Aboriginal women who went off to tell their husbands. Pelletier must have been very weak from the long journey, the wounds he had received at Rossel Island and with his feet cut by the coral. He was taken in by the Aboriginal group, adopted by one of the men called Maademan, and was given the new name, 'Amglo'.

A biography of Pelletier recorded after his return to France by Constant Merland contains details of the "social organisation, language, beliefs, treatment of illnesses, mortuary practices, bodily decoration, dances, conflict, punishments, subsistence activities and crafts" of the people who rescued and cared for him. This provides a precious insight into the way of life of these people before they had sustained contact with Europeans, and broadly agrees with present understandings of the conditions at the time by both anthropologists and modern Aboriginal residents.

Pelletier's account contains little about the spiritual beliefs, sacred knowledge, sorcery and similar subjects. Amongst most, if not all, Aboriginal tribes in Australia, the information of this nature was kept secret – not just from outsiders, but from uninitiated people and those of the opposite sex in their own tribe. Those who are shown or taught about such matters are almost always placed under solemn obligations not to divulge them, and this, indeed, lends credence to Pelletier's story:

"It is unlikely that a boy who was adopted by a clan member, grew to manhood and was betrothed would not be inducted into Uutaalnganu ways as an initiated man.... Donald Thomson found that the realm of belief and secret knowledge was not freely talked about by the Kuuku Ya'u, a language group contiguous with the Uutaalnganu people. This would be so by definition, but it makes Pelletier's reticence quite explicable.... All of this suggests his continuing adherence to the belief system of the Uutaalganu."

On 11 April 1875, a pearling boat, the John Bell, captained by Joseph Frazer, and based at Jervis Island (now Mabuiag Island) in the Torres Strait, was anchored off Night Island (Queensland) and some men were sent ashore to find water. The landing party came across a group of Aborigines accompanied by a white man and reported the encounter to the captain. Joseph Frazer sent his men back with some things to barter in exchange for the white man. According to Merland's biography, Pelletier's adopted father Maademan encouraged him to trade with the seamen and they persuaded him to go with them. However, Pelletier always maintained that he was kidnapped, not rescued, and that he did not want to leave his Aboriginal family. He could not communicate with the sailors who spoke English and believed that they would shoot him if he tried to escape. He was then taken to the small administrative outpost of Somerset, at the tip of Cape York, from where a report of his discovery was sent to the Colonial Secretary, Arthur Macalister.

He had trouble at first remembering his French which he was able to use to communicate with two men then at Somerset who spoke the language. He reportedly made some attempts to escape while still at Somerset. His bodily markings (cicatrices) and piercings were noted and he apparently confided to one person that he had had three children during his stay with the Aborigines, but this claim has never been substantiated. Another report from this time states that he had 'left two children behind'.

Pelletier left Somerset 14 May 1875 on the Brisbane, another ship carrying Chinese labourers for the Australian goldfields headed to Sydney, via Cooktown, Townsville, Bowen, Keppel Bay, and Brisbane, arriving in Sydney on 25 May. He was there for 38 days in which time he was the object of much curiosity and was contacted by the French consul there who had him photographed. He was photographed again after his arrival in France The photographs clearly show the cicatrices on chest and arms and the holes in his ears (which had previously held wooden plugs) are clearly visible. One of these photographs appears in the frontispiece of the book published about his experience, Dix-sept ans chez les sauvages : aventures de Narcisse Pelletier.

He arrived in Toulon on 13 December, where one of his brothers met him and took him to Paris. He finally returned to his home town of Saint-Gilles on 2 January where he was greeted triumphantly by his family and the whole population of the town with great shouts of "Long live Pelletier!" The next day a mass of thanksgiving was celebrated in the local church by the same priest who had baptised him 32 years previously.

After returning to France he was offered a job in a travelling show but, when he found out he was to be displayed as 'the huge Anglo-Australian giant,' he firmly refused. He later got work as a lighthouse keeper of the Phare de l'Aiguillon near Saint-Nazaire. In 1880, then aged 36, he married a seamstress, Louise Désirée Mabileau, who was 22 at the time. His marriage certificate gives his occupation as 'signalman.' They lived near the entrance to the harbour of Saint-Nazaire where he worked, but had no children. He died on 28 September 1894, aged 50. The death certificate says he was a clerk at the harbour at this time.
