= Islands North of Port Stewart Important Bird Area =

Important Bird Area in Queensland, Australia

Coordinates: 13°36′31″S 143°45′56″E

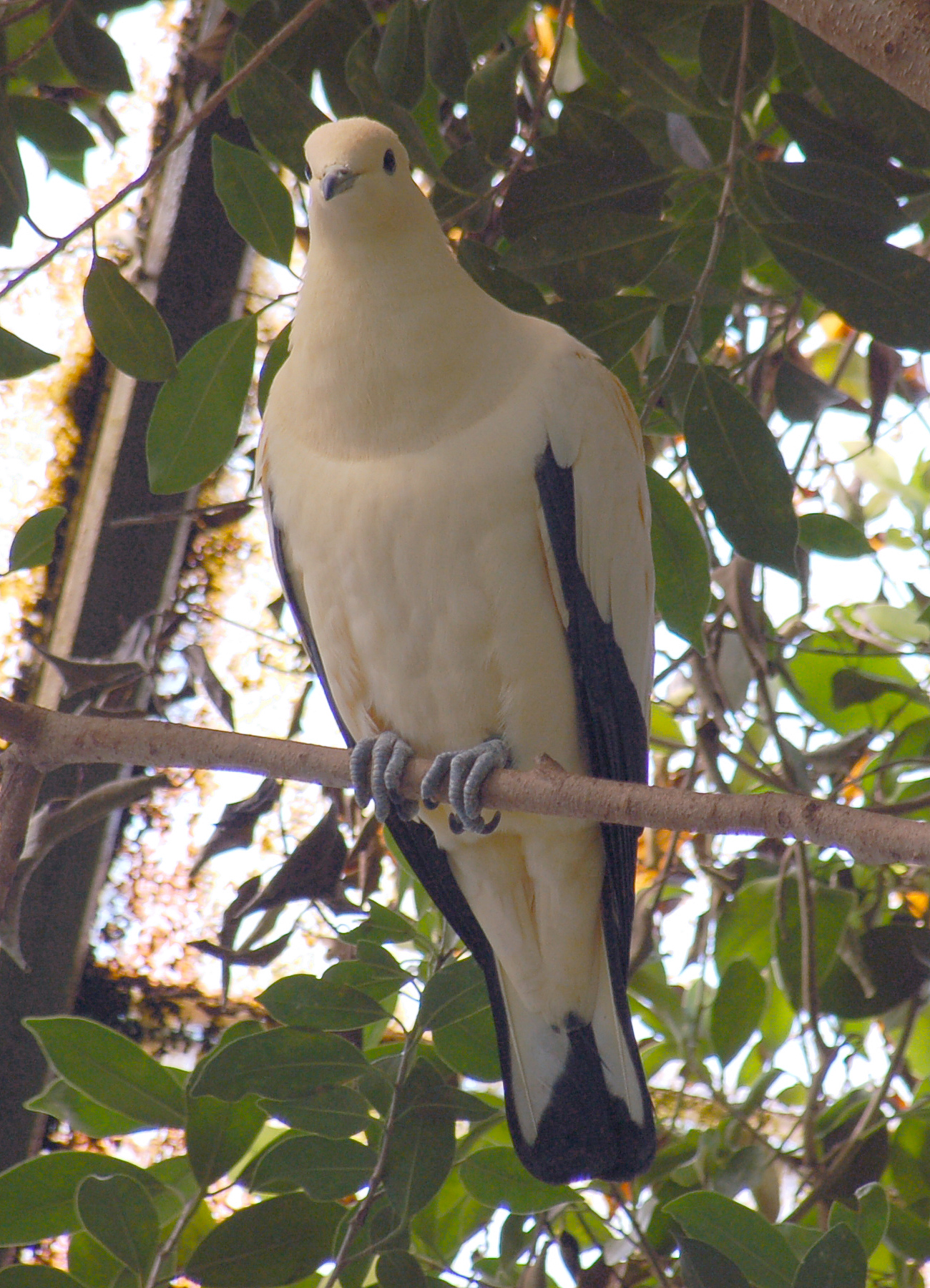
The IBA is an important area for pied imperial-pigeons

The Islands North of Port Stewart Important Bird Area comprises ten small islands, with a combined area of 137 ha, on the Great Barrier Reef, off the north-eastern coast of the Cape York Peninsula, Queensland, Australia.

== Description ==
Most of the islands are low-lying coral cays, vegetated with grass, herbs and vines. Some of the larger islands have patches of Pisonia grandis or mangroves. The climate is tropical and monsoonal, with the nearby mainland supporting rainforest. The IBA lies opposite the Iron and McIlwraith Ranges Important Bird Area (IBA), which provides feeding habitat for pied imperial-pigeons nesting on the islands.

The islands extend from Night Island, lying off the coast of the McIlwraith Range, southwards to Burkitt Island, north of Port Stewart. They have been identified by BirdLife International as an IBA because, collectively, they support over 1% of the world populations of nesting pied imperial-pigeons, brown boobies and lesser crested terns.

The islands include:

- Night Island (50 ha)
- Lowrie Islet (1 ha)
- Sand Bank No. 7 (2 ha)
- Sand Bank No. 8 (3 ha)
- Morris Island (2 ha)
- Hay Island (10 ha)
- Hannah Island (30 ha)
- Pelican Island (8 ha)
- Stainer Island (1 ha)
- Burkitt Island (20 ha)
