= Far North Queensland Indigenous Sign Language =

Deaf sign language of Australia

Indigenous Sign Language
- ISL
- Region: Cape York Peninsula, Australia
- Language family: contact language/lingua franca, based on Umpila Sign etc.

Language codes
- ISO 639-3: None (mis)
- Glottolog: fnqi1234

Indigenous Sign Language (ISL) is an emerging contact language used by aboriginal deaf people in urban centers of Far North Queensland (Cape York Peninsula) such as Cairns.

With the decline of aboriginal oral and signed languages, an increase in communication between aboriginal communities and migration of people to the cities, aboriginal deaf people have developed ISL as a common contact language in preference to using the Auslan taught in schools, both due to the comfort of using the auxiliary sign language many of them were raised with in their communities, and to preserve their cultural heritage. The best developed auxiliary sign languages in the area include Umpila Sign Language of the Ombila and Pakadji people, and these are presumably the main component of ISL, but there also appear to be influences of less-developed sign languages of the region such as those of the Guugu Yimidhirr and Kuuk Thaayorre, as well as Torres Strait sign languages. Indeed, it is possible that ISL comprises several contact languages, though many of the aboriginal communities of the northern Cape use very similar sign systems to begin with – many sign systems on the mainland differ more in the number of signs and the number of people proficient in them (especially older women) than in the signs themselves or their grammar.
