= Virginia Beavert =

Native American linguist (1921–2024)

- Born: November 30, 1921; Blue Mountains, Oregon, U.S.
- Died: February 8, 2024 (aged 102); Yakima, Washington, U.S.
- Other name: Tuxámshish
- Parent(s): Father: Henry Beavert; Mother: Ellen Saluskin; Stepfather: Alexander Saluskin

Academic background
- Education: University of Oregon
- Thesis: Wantwint Inmi Tiinawit: A Reflection of What I Have Learned (2012)

Academic work
- Notable works: The Gift of Knowledge/Ttnúwit Átawish Nch'inch'imamí: Reflections on Sahaptin Ways (2019); Ichishkíin Sinwit Yakama / Yakima Sahaptin Dictionary (2009)

Virginia R. Beavert (November 30, 1921 – February 8, 2024) was a Native American linguist of the Ichishkíin language at the University of Oregon.

== Linguist career ==
As early as the age of 12, Beavert began working with Melville Jacobs and other linguists and anthropologists as a liaison and interpreter. In the 1940s, Beavert served in the Women’s Army Corps in New Mexico during World War II for three years. As a result of her distance from Native speakers of Ichishkíin, she discovered it was a struggle to communicate as fluently during a phone call to her mother.

Her parents, Ellen Saluskin, and stepfather Alex Saluskin worked alongside linguist and anthropologist Bruce Rigsby from the University of Oregon. Their work to develop the Ichishkíin alphabet eventually transformed into the first Ichishkíin dictionary in 1975, which Beavert participated in with her stepfather and Dr. Bruce Rigsby.

When her stepfather Alexander Saluskin (also known as Chief Wi-ya-wikt) became ill in the 1970s, she set out to get a college education in anthropology and language studies. Her stepfather motivated and encouraged her to pursue her education and teach Ichishkíin, to anyone interested in learning.

Beavert cautions that Native languages, cultures, and traditions are not one and the same; while there may be similarities between practices and dialects, many anthropologists and ethnographers mistakenly use information on Native cultures interchangeably.

== Personal life ==
Beavert was born in a cave of the Blue Mountains of eastern Oregon during a blizzard, on November 30, 1921. Beavert completed a bachelor's degree in anthropology at Central Washington University in 1986. After teaching at Heritage College on the Yakama Reservation, Beavert decided to return to school to fine-tune her methods for teaching language.

In 2000, Beavert graduated with a master's in bilingual and bicultural education from the University of Arizona.

At the age of 90, she earned her doctorate in linguistics from the University of Oregon and is the school's oldest graduate in history.

Beavert died in Yakima, Washington, on February 8, 2024, at the age of 102.

== Selected publications ==
- Beavert, Virginia; Consortium of Johnson O'Malley Committees of Region IV, State of Washington (1974). The way it was : Anaku Iwacha : Yakima legends. Franklin Press. OCLC 1340594.
- Beavert, Virginia; Consortium of Johnson O'Malley Committees of Region IV, State of Washington; Confederated Tribes and Bands of the Yakima Indian Nation (1975). Yakima language practical dictionary. Toppenish, Wash.: Consortium of Johnson-O'Malley Committees, Region IV. OCLC 9770884.
- A Song to the Creator: Weaving Arts of Native Women of the Plateau [first publication: 1996]
- Beavert, Virginia; Hargus, Sharon (2009). Ichishkíin Sínwit. Toppenish, Wash. : Seattle: University of Washington Press. ISBN 978-0-295-98915-0. OCLC 268797329.
- The Gift of Knowledge: Ttnúwit Átawish Nchʼinchʼimamí: Reflections on Sahaptin Ways [first publication: 2017]
- Beavert, Virginia (2019-09-16). The Gift of Knowledge / Ttnúwit Átawish Nch'inch'imamí. ISBN 978-0-295-74612-8.
- Ruef, Jennifer L.; Johnson, Stephany Runninghawk; Jacob, Michelle M.; Jansen, Joana; Beavert, Virginia (2019). "Why STEM Needs Indigenous Traditional Ecological Knowledge: A Case Study of Ichishkain Math". International Journal of Gender, Science and Technology. 11 (3): 429–439. ISSN 2040-0748.
- Beavert, Virginia R.; Jacob, Michelle M.; Jansen, Joana W. (2020). Anakú Iwachá. Confederated Tribes and Bands of the Yakama Nation. ISBN 978-0-295-74824-5.

== Honors and awards ==
Beavert received the Washington Governor's Heritage Award in 2006. In 2007 the Society for the Study of the Indigenous Languages of the Americas awarded her with the Ken Hale prize. In 2008 she received the Distinguished Service Award from the University of Oregon, and in 2009 she received an honorary degree from the University of Washington.
