= La Mont West =

American anthropologist (1930–2022)

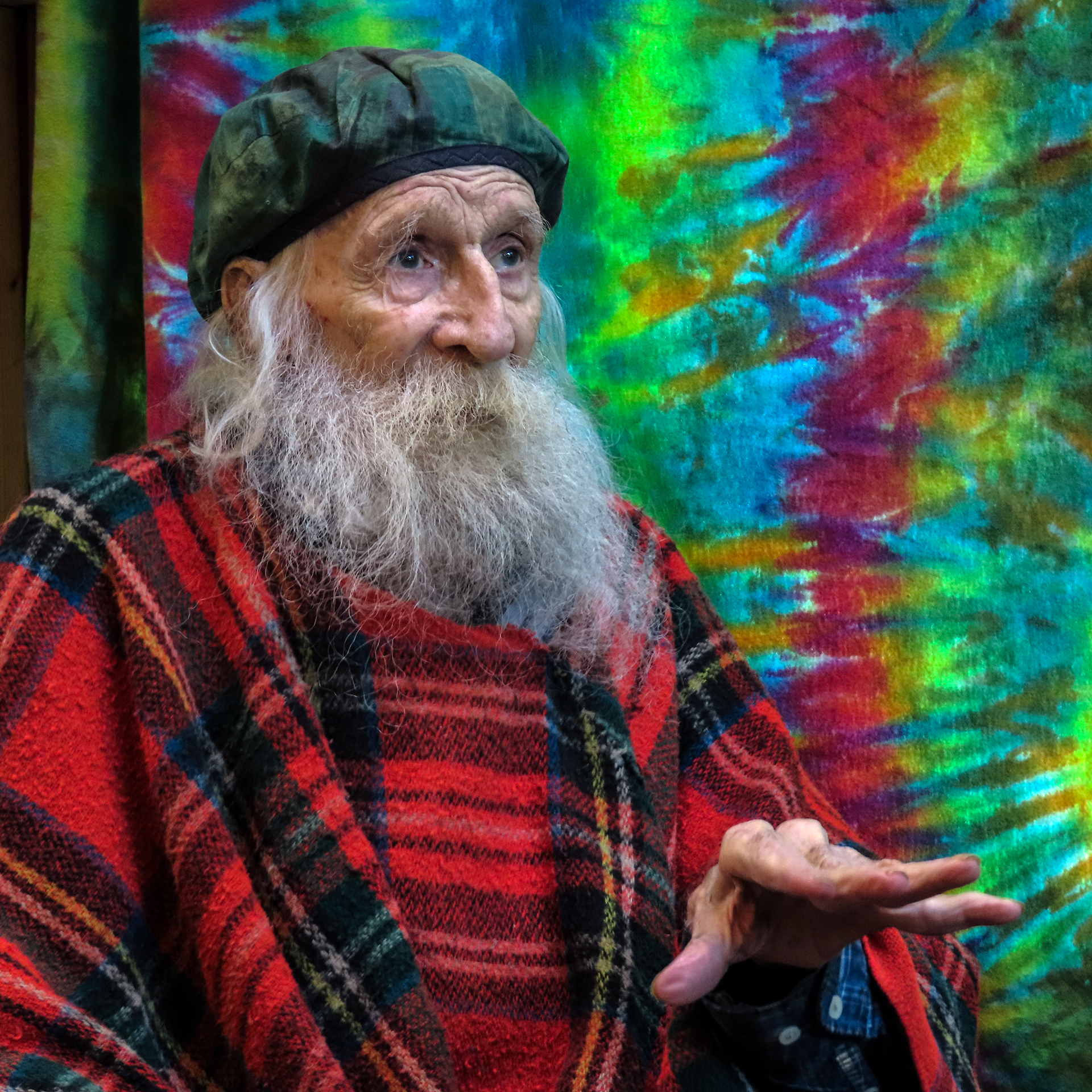
Tan Cahil (LaMont West) interviewed by documentarian Peter Ray

La Mont West Jr. (July 2, 1930 – 2022) was an American anthropologist. He received his PhD in anthropology from Indiana University Bloomington in 1960. He specialized in sign languages, which he studied among Native American Indians and Aboriginal Australians.

== Career ==
West was born in Southwest City, Missouri on July 2, 1930. He attended Cornell University, majoring in economics, from September 1947 to February 1951, and also from February 1955 to June 1955. He attended Indiana University Bloomington as a PhD candidate, majoring in anthropology, and became a protégé of Charles F. Voegelin, his doctoral supervisor, and Alfred L. Kroeber, who were concerned with the neglect suffered by the topic since the late 19th century. He was at Indiana University from June 1955 to June 1959, doing field work among Plains Indians, the results of which were published with his doctoral dissertation, entitled "The Sign Language, An Analysis," a study of Plains Indian Sign Language, which was the most sophisticated non-verbal language among North American Indians. Both Kroeber and Voegelin had done some work on sign languages, building on the pioneering work of Garrick Mallery and West's two volumes constituted what was the most comprehensive fieldwork survey and analysis of the American native sign system. He discovered this variety had two distinct dialects, and expanded the inventory of known signs, hitherto numbered as ranging from one to three thousand, into a repertoire of 3,500 distinct signs. It was often thought that use of sign language indicated lack of linguistic acumen, with an inability to master English: West's informants often proved to be multi-lingual, fluent in English also. Far from dying out, he discovered that the sign language had expanded its geographic horizons by spreading up into Canada from British Columbia through Manitoba, into areas where it had formerly been unknown.

West received a grant from AIAS (now AIATSIS) to study Australian Aboriginal sign languages for one year. He spun out the grant to enable him to conduct research for a full two years, by leading a spartan life, skipping meals and living rough as he traveled virtually everywhere over the Australian continent. He was known to prefer interviewing the eldest tribal men, whatever their state of health, rather than use younger informants. West regarded the hand languages as self-contained language systems, though coexisting with formal languages, and focused on developing a notation system to enable morphemic and phonemic analysis.

He recorded traditional didgeridoo music by Aboriginal Elders. These are some of the earliest known recordings, and selections were released commercially in 1963 as Arnhem Land Popular Classics. He spent time at the Lockhart River Mission, Queensland, where he managed to film the local initiation ceremony (bora).

West was reputedly reclusive, though most of the materials and artifacts he collected were, after he was contacted by Bruce Rigsby, donated to the National Museum of Australia Canberra. He lived in Vashon, Washington, United States. He used the stage name "Tan Cahil".

Under the stage name Tan Cahil he performed with the group "Tribal Voices" releasing CDs through Bard's Cathedral. He died in 2022, at the age of 92.
