= The Gift of Knowledge / Ttnúwit Átawish Nchʼinchʼimamí =

Book on Native American culture

- Image of first edition cover
- Author: Virginia Beavert
- Language: English, Sahaptin (Ichishkíin)
- Genre: Autobiography, Native American history
- Publisher: University of Washington Press
- Publication date: June 8, 2017
- Media type: Hardcover, paperback, e-book
- ISBN: 978-0295741659

The Gift of Knowledge / Ttnúwit Átawish Nchʼinchʼimamí is a semi-autobiographical indigenous history by Virginia R. Beavert that was first published on June 8, 2017, by University of Washington Press. The book is written in both English and Beavert's native language of Ichishkíin. In it, Beavert tells stories of her life growing up in a traditional Native American family mixed in with tales of her culture, family life, traditions and numerous other aspects of indigenous life. Beavert's goal is to revive her native language by teaching the younger generation and developing a written alphabet.

== Critical reception ==
Writing in the Oregon Historical Quarterly, David-Paul B. Hedberg said "The Gift of Knowledge... adds very important contributions to the fields of sociolinguistic, ethnography, Pacific Northwest history, and cultural anthropology." He goes on to say, "In a powerful moment, her words reach through the page to confront outsiders who take things out of context and apply a simplistic view of Native peoples."

The Journal of the West applauds the author: "Her passion for and interest in the welfare of her younger readers reverberates throughout every page of The Gift of Knowledge in which her stated purpose is to record the lifeways taught to her by her family growing up in a remote village in eastern Washington state."

Tribal College Journal describes the book as "a treasure trove of material for those interested in Native American culture."

The Pacific Northwest Quarterly describes The Gift of Knowledge as "An accessible and insightful book, animated with traditions and wisdom, a treasure for future Yakama and other Indian peoples."
