= Barungguan =

Aboriginal Australian people

The Barungguan are an Aboriginal Australian people of the Cape York Peninsula of Northern Queensland. The name is associated with three languages: Ganganda, Umpithamu and Morrobolam.

== Name ==
The anthropologist Donald Thomson classified them (speaking of them as the Yintjinga) as one of what he called the Kawadji peoples.

== Country ==
According to Norman Tindale, writing in 1974, (Note: Tindale with Hale wrote in 1933: 'The Barunguan tribe extends along the coast from Running Creek south nearly to Cape Direction. Kokolamalama names for the tribe are Baa and Banjingam... There are five local groups or clans who claim this tribal name. The southernmost is the Yninbata, who frequent the country south of Stewart River, on the southern bank of the mouth of which they make their northernmost camp. Their main camps are on Balelutha Creek.' (Hale & Tindale 1933, p. 70)) the Barungguan had about 700 square miles (1,800 km^{2}) of tribal land, on the western side of Princess Charlotte Bay and extending northwards toward Cape Sidmouth. Their furthest northern limit appears to have been around the Rocky River, beyond which they rarely ventured.

== Social organisation ==
The Barungguan were organized into clans the names of at least two of which are known:

- Umbuigamu
- Umbindhamu

As with the neighbouring Walmbaria, tooth avulsion was practiced on all members of either sex among the Barungguan, with either the right or left upper incisor extracted for ritual purposes.

== Alternative names ==
- Baka (Kaantju exonym)
- Banjigam (Bakanambia exonym)
- Barunguan (typo)
- Ganganda
- Jintjingga (native toponym for a site at the mouth of the Stewart River)
- Njindingga
- Umbindhamu
- Umbuigamu
- Yintjingga

Source: Tindale 1974, p. 165

== Sources ==
- Hale, H. M.; Tindale, N.B. (1933). "Aborigines of Princess Charlotte Bay, North Queensland". Records of the South Australian Museum. 5 (1). Adelaide: 64–116.
- Thomson, Donald F. (July–December 1934). "The Dugong Hunters of Cape York". Journal of the Royal Anthropological Institute of Great Britain and Ireland. 64: 237–263. doi:10.2307/2843809. JSTOR 2843809.
- Tindale, Norman Barnett (1974). "Barungguan (QLD)". Aboriginal Tribes of Australia: Their Terrain, Environmental Controls, Distribution, Limits, and Proper Names. Australian National University Press. ISBN 978-0-708-10741-6.
