= Hay Island (Queensland) =

Island in Queensland, Australia

- Interactive map of Hay Island

Geography
- Location: Northern Australia
- Coordinates: 13.670°S 143.692°E
- Area: 0.42 km^{2} (0.16 sq mi)

Administration
- Australia
- State: Queensland

Admiralty Chart (no. 3762) Hay Island to Bow Reef; published 1911 (not to be used for current navigation)

Hay Island is a 10 ha coral cay that is part of the Great Barrier Reef Marine Park west of Cape Melville, Queensland, Australia. It lies east of Coen in the Claremont Isles. It is part of the Islands North of Port Stewart Important Bird Area. It is around 42 hectares or 0.42 square km in size.
