= Umpithamu language =

Extinct Australian Aboriginal language

Umpithamu
- Umbindhamu
- Native to: Australia
- Region: Cape York Peninsula, Queensland
- Ethnicity: Umpithamu, Lamalama, possibly Barungguan
- Native speakers: 1-10 (2018-19)
- Language family: Pama–Nyungan: Paman; Lamalamic?; Umpithamu

Language codes
- ISO 639-3: umd
- Glottolog: umbi1243
- AIATSIS: Y50
- ELP: Umpithamu

Umpithamu, also spelt Umbindhamu, is an Australian Aboriginal language of the Cape York Peninsula, Queensland, Australia.

== Classification ==
Though generally accepted as a branch of the Paman languages, Dixon believes it to be an isolate. According to Rigsby (1997), Umpithamu shares some grammatical features with the other languages spoken by the Lamalama people, but it shares more lexicon with Ayapathu and Umpila.

In 2008, Verstraete wrote that there were four languages associated with the Lamalama people: Umpithamu, Morrobolam, Mba Rumbathama (Mbarrumbathama, Lamalama) and Rimanggudinhma language (Mbariman-Gudhinma). In 2020, he spoke of five languages associated with the Lamalama people, but the name of the fifth is not recorded in the article.

He is quoted by Austlang from his 2018 work, The Genetic Status of Lamalamic, that Lamalama, Rimanggudinhma and Morrobolam form a genetic subgroup of Paman known as Lamalamic, "defined by shared innovations in phonology and morphology".

"Yintjinggu/Jintjingga" is a place name used for both Umpithamu and the neighbouring Ayabadhu language.

== Phonology ==
=== Vowels ===
	Front	Back
High	i iː	u uː
Mid	ɛ ɛː	ɔ ɔː
Low	a aː	

- Short sounds /i, u, ɛ, ɔ/ may also be heard as [ɪ, ʊ, e, o]. Long sounds /uː, ɛː, ɔː/ can also be heard as [ʊː, eː, oː].

=== Consonants ===
	Peripheral		Laminal		Apical	Glottal
	Bilabial	Velar	Palatal	Dental	Alveolar	Glottal
Plosive	p	k	c	t̪	t	ʔ
Nasal	m	ŋ	ɲ	n̪	n	
Trill					r	
Lateral					l	
Approximant	w		j		ɹ	

- /p, k, t̪, c, t/ are heard as voiced [b, ɡ, d̪, ɟ, d] in intervocalic or post-nasal positions.

== Documentation ==
In July 2020, A Dictionary of Umpithamu was published, compiled by Flemish linguist Jean-Christophe Verstraete, with main language consultants Florrie Bassani and her niece Joan Liddy.
