= Wuthathi =

Aboriginal Australian people of north-eastern Queensland

The Wuthathi, also known as the Mutjati, are an Aboriginal Australian people of the state of Queensland. Anthropologist Norman Tindale distinguished the Mutjati from the Otati, whereas AIATSIS treats the two ethnonyms as variants related to the one ethnic group, the Wuthathi.

== Language ==
Wuthathi is considered to have been a dialect of the Uradhi branch of the Paman languages.

A list of some 400 words of the Otati language was taken down by Charles Gabriel Seligman, and a further 60 by George Pimm, members of Cambridge Anthropological Expedition to Torres Straits in the late 19th century. Anthropologist Lamont West recorded 200 words of the Wuthathi language with Tom Warren, a traditional owner in 1965.

== Country ==
The Wuthathi, according to Tindale, held sway over some 150 square miles (390 km^{2}) of territory extending north from Shelburne Bay to the vicinity of Orford Ness. The area around Shelburne Bay has been described as some of "the most beautiful coastal and island country in Australia, if not the world", and was home to over 30 rare and threatened species of fauna as the double-wattled cassowary and the palm cockatoo. One report. issued after the battle for the conservation of Shelburne Bay from silica mining had been won, stated of Shelburne, together with the Cape Flattery duneland:

The extraordinary landscapes of these two largest dunefields make a lasting impression on all who view them. Active, large elongated parabolic dunes rise like snow-clad hills above vegetation and/or lake filled swales. Low ridges (<2m high) in repeated v-shapes form so called Gegenwalle ground patterns within the dunefields, that are the best developed and largest in the world.

Donald Thomson places the Otati on the coast south of Oxford Bay down to Margaret Bay. Norman Tindale stated that the Otati dwelt in their traditional lands, measuring roughly 300 square miles (780 km^{2}), which extended from the southern part of Shelburne Bay, east and south to the Macmillan River, inland as far as the headwaters of the Dulhunty River. Tindale's distinction of the Otati with the Mutjati is not accepted by AIATSIS, which regards the two as variants of the one name.

== Mythology ==
Wuthathi origin stories focus on their totem, the Diamond stingray, in Wuthathi called yama, which had been washed up on shore and flipped on its back during a tempest, exposing its pure white belly, a tale which apparently had an aetiological purpose for explaining the dazzling white silica dunes characteristic of the site.

== Lifestyle and economy ==
The Otati were one of the Kawadji, or sandbeach people, like the Pakadji, Olkola and others, who lived along the coast facing the Coral Sea and fished for food in the rivers and ocean.

== History of contact ==
The Wuthathi were uprooted from the Shelburne Bay area and forcefully herded by the Queensland Government down to the Lockhart Mission where they were forbidden to practice their customs or speak their language. The land they were dispossessed of was then leased out to white pastoralists.

When word leaked out in 1985 that a joint Japanese Australian consortium, Shelburne Silica, proposed mining the white silica sand dunes at Shelburne Bay and was seeking a mining lease to work over 765 square kilometres (295 mi^{2}) of dunefields, in order to extract and export 400,000 tonnes a year for the Japanese glass manufacturing industry, the displaced Wuthathi and Australian conservation activists, the latter headed by Don Henry of the Wildlife Preservation Society of Queensland, mobilized to challenge the plan through the courts. The consortium produced documentation claiming that the Wuthathi people were extinct, though one descendant, Alik Pablo, artfully demonstrated his knowledge of the bay when miners lawyers tested him with an upturned map to confuse him. Despite a ruling by the Mining Warden in favour of the indigenous people, the government of Joh Bjelke-Petersen persisted in ignoring the decision. Eventually the then Prime Minister Bob Hawke, included the Shelburne Bay in one of the four conservation areas he marked out as crucial to the national interest, the others being The Daintree Wet Tropics, Kakadu and the Tasmanian Wilderness.

In 2016, after a century of dispossession, the Wuthathi right to 118,000 hectares of this spectacular coastal landscape was recognized.

== Alternative names ==
- Empikeno
- Idjonyengadi
- Mudjadi, Mutjati, Mutyati
- Mutyati
- Odadi, Ojnandi, Onyengadi, Onyengadi
- Oradhi, Otati
- Oyonggo, Oyungo
- Umtadee
- Unjadi, Unyadi
- Wotadi, Wotati
- Wudjadi, Wudjadi
- Wundjur, Wutati, Wutati

Source: Wuthathi

== Sources ==
- "Language, Totems and Stories". Great Barrier Reef Marine Park Authority.
- McConnel, Ursula H. (December 1950). "Junior Marriage Systems: Comparative Survey". Oceania. 21 (2): 107–145. doi:10.1002/j.1834-4461.1950.tb01709.x. JSTOR 40328279.
- Meadows, Michael (2001). Voices in the Wilderness: Images of Aboriginal People in the Australian Media. Greenwood Publishing Group. ISBN 978-0-313-31566-4.
- Robertson, Joshua (15 December 2016). "Shelburne Bay in Cape York handed back to Wuthathi people after 20-year battle". The Guardian.
- Seligman, Charles Gabriel; Pimm, George (2011) [First published 1907]. Ray, Sidney Herbert (ed.). Reports of the Cambridge Anthropological Expedition to Torres Straits. Vol. 3. Cambridge University Press. pp. 277–282. ISBN 978-1-001-42336-4.
- "Shelburne Bay Decision". The Wilderness Society, Australian Conservation Foundation. 8 September 2003. Archived from the original on 30 December 2017.
- Thomson, Donald F. (1933). "The Hero Cult, Initiation and Totemism on Cape York". The Journal of the Royal Anthropological Institute of Great Britain and Ireland. 63: 453–537. doi:10.2307/2843801. JSTOR 2843801.
- Thomson, Donald F. (1972). Kinship and Behaviour in North Queensland: A preliminary account of kinship and Social Organisation on Cape York Peninsula. Australian Institute of Aboriginal Studies.
- Tindale, Norman Barnett (1974). "Otati (QLD)". Aboriginal Tribes of Australia: Their Terrain, Environmental Controls, Distribution, Limits, and Proper Names. Australian National University Press. ISBN 978-0-708-10741-6.
- West, Lamont (1965), Transcription of Lamont West's (LMWs) tapes A1459 from 33 : 00 on side B, and A1460A and up to 42 : 00 on side B / by B.J. Alpher, AIATSIS
- Wright, Tony (17 December 2016). "Wuthathi return to Dreaming as white sands of Shelburne Bay given back". The Sydney Morning Herald.
- "Wuthathi". The AustKin project.
