= Ilana Mushin =

Australian linguist

Ilana Mushin FAHA is an Australian linguist.

Mushin's research interests include the Garrawa language, discourse and stance. Mushin is currently an associate professor at The University of Queensland in the School of Languages and Cultures. She is an Associate Investigator with the Centre of Excellence "Dynamics of Language".

She is the President of the Australian Linguistics Society (2017–2019), and was Vice-President of the society in 2016. In 2016 she was a plenary speakers at the Applied Linguistics Association of Australia annual conference. She specializes in Australian Aboriginal languages and was elected a Fellow of the Australian Academy of the Humanities in 2023.

== Selected publications ==
- (2012) A Grammar of (Western) Garrwa. Berlin: Mouton De Gruyter.
- (2008) Discourse and Grammar in Australian Languages. Amsterdam: John Benjamins. (with Brett Baker)
- (2011) Indigenous Language and Social Identity. Canberra: Pacific Linguistics. (edited with Brett Baker, Mark Harvey and Rod Gardner)
- (2001) Evidentiality and Epistemological Stance: Narrative Retelling. Amsterdam: John Benjamins
