= Lockhart River (Queensland) =

Lockhart
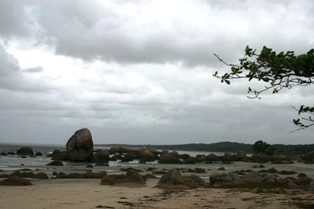
- Quintell Beach, Lockhart River

- Location of Lockhart river mouth in Queensland
- Etymology: Hugh Lockhart

Location
- Country: Australia
- Territory: Queensland
- Region: Far North Queensland

Physical characteristics
- Source: Chester Peak
  - location: Chester Range, Cape York Peninsula, Australia
  - coordinates: 13.15556°S 143.39875°E
  - elevation: 46 m (151 ft)
- Mouth: Lloyd Bay
  - location: Coral Sea, Australia
  - coordinates: 12.9°S 143.4°E
  - elevation: 0 m (0 ft)
- Length: 36 km (22 mi)
- Basin size: 765 km^{2} (295 sq mi)
- Discharge
  - location: Near mouth
  - average: 12.5 m^{3}/s (390 GL/a)

The Lockhart River is a river in the Shire of Cook, Queensland, Australia.

== Geography ==
The headwaters of the river rise under Chester Peak in the Chester Range, part of the Great Dividing Range, and flows northwards. It continues past High Range and Heming Range eventually discharging into Lloyd Bay in the Coral Sea.

The river has a catchment area of 2,883 square kilometres (1,113 sq mi) of which an area of 134 square kilometres (52 sq mi) is composed of estuarine wetlands.

== History ==
The river was named by the explorer Robert Logan Jack in 1880 after his friend Hugh Lockhart.

== See also ==
- List of rivers of Australia § Queensland
