= Bruce Rigsby =

American-Australian anthropologist (1937–2022)

- Born: Bruce Joseph Rigsby; 1937; Louisville, Kentucky, U.S.
- Died: March 19, 2022 (aged 84–85)
- Education: University of Louisville; University of Oregon
- Occupation: Anthropological Linguist
- Spouse: Barbara Flowers
- Children: Mark Rigsby and Jan Rigsby-Jones

Bruce Rigsby (1937 – March 19, 2022) was an American-Australian anthropologist specializing in the languages and ethnography of native peoples on both continents. He was professor emeritus at Queensland University, and a member of both the Australian Anthropological Society and the American Anthropological Association.

== Career ==
Bruce Rigsby was born in 1937. He obtained his bachelor's degree at the University of Louisville in international studies, specializing in the area of the Soviet bloc. He then went on to obtain a PhD in anthropology at the University of Oregon, doing fieldwork to gather materials on the Umatilla and Yakama in 1963. He absorbed the Boasian-Sapir tradition of American ethnolinguistics, combining linguistics and anthropology. His doctoral dissertation was on the southern tribes and languages of the Columbia Plateau. He developed a particular research focus on and specialization in Sahaptin ethnography, Sahaptin language and Nass-Gitksan people, their language and history.

In 1975 he became head of the new department of Anthropology at University of Queensland, and directed his interests towards the languages and tribes of the Eastern Cape York Peninsula, and Princess Charlotte Bay. Rigsby has also been active in defending indigenous claims for native title and represented the Cape York Land Council regarding the Rinyirru and Marpa National Parks land claims. Notably in his court appearance, when interviewing George Musgrave for his testimony, Rigsby adopted the elder's idiom of Australian English in deference to Musgrave's age and status. He was adopted into the Lamalama tribe.

Generations of students have been the beneficiaries of what Alice Gaby has called Rigsby's 'phenomenal generosity'. Comments by Peter Sutton and other colleagues on his career are available at a video recording the launching of a festschrift in his honour, available on YouTube.

== Publications ==
- 1975 'Nass-Gitksan: An Analytic Ergative Syntax,' International Journal of American Linguistics volume 41 issue 4 December 1975 pages 344–354
- 1999 with Finlayson, J. D., and Bek, H.). Introduction. In J. D. Finlayson, B. Rigsby and H. Bek (Ed.), Connections in Native Title: Genealogies, Kinship and Groups, Australian National University, Canberra: Centre for Aboriginal Economic Policy Research pp. 1–13.
- 1999 'Genealogies, kinship and local group composition: Old Yintjingga (Port Stewart) in the late 1920s,' In J. D. Finlayson, B. Rigsby and H. Bek (Ed.), Connections in Native Title: Genealogies, Kinship and Groups, Canberra: Center for Aboriginal Economic Policy Res., ANU pages 107–123
- 2005 'The Languages of Eastern Cape York Peninsula and Linguistic Anthropology,' In B. Rigsby and N. Peterson (eds.), Donald Thomson. The Man and Scholar, Canberra, Australian Capital Territory, Australia: The Academy of the Social Sciences in Australia pages 129–142.
- 2005 with and Peterson, N. 'Introduction,' in B. Rigsby and N. Peterson (eds.), Donald Thomson. The Man and Scholar, Canberra: The Academy of the Social Sciences in Australia, pages 1–16
- 2008 'The Stevens Treaties, Indian Claims Commission docket 264, and the Ancient One known as Kennewick Man,' in Alexander Harmon (ed.), The power of promises: Rethinking Indian treaties in the Pacific Northwest, Seattle, Washington, United States: University of Washington Press pages 244–276
- 2010 'The origin and history of the name 'Sahaptin',' in Virginia Beavert and Sharon Hargus (Ed.), Ichishkíin Sínwit: Yakama/Yakima Sahaptin Dictionary, pages xviii-xxi, Toppenish, Washington, United States: Heritage University; University of Washington Press.
- 2010 'The origin and history of the name Yakama/Yakima,' in Virginia Beavert and Sharon Hargus (eds.), Ichishkíin Sínwit: Yakama/Yakima Sahaptin Dictionary, Toppenish, Washington, United States: Heritage University; University of Washington Press pages xxii-xxxiv
- (c) 'Social theory, expert evidence and the Yorta Yorta rights appeal decision,' in Louis Knafla and Haijo Westra (Eds.), Aboriginal title and indigenous peoples: Canada, Australia, and New Zealand, Vancouver, British Columbia, Canada: UBC Press pages 53–84.
- 2011 With Diane Hafner,'Place and property at Yintjingga/ Port Stewart under Aboriginal law and Oueensland law,' In Brett Baker, Ilana Mushin, Mark Harvey and Rod Gardner (Eds.), Indigenous language and social identity: Papers in honour of Michael Walsh, Canberra, Australian Capital Territory, Australia: Pacific Linguistics pages 33–44.
- 2015 with Christophe Verstraete,A Grammar and Lexicon of Yintyingka, Walter de Gruyter

== Notes and references ==
=== References ===
- Gaby, Alice (2016). "Hyponymy and the structure of Kuuk Thaayorre kinship". In Verstraete, Jean-Christophe; Hafner, Diane (eds.). Land and Language in Cape York Peninsula and the Gulf Country. John Benjamins Publishing Company. pp. 159–178. ISBN 978-9-027-26760-3.
- Langton, Marcia (2002). "The edge of the sacred, the edge of death: sensual inscriptions". In David, Bruno; Wilson Sebeok, Meredith (eds.). Inscribed Landscapes: Marking and Making Place. University of Hawaiʻi Press. pp. 253–269. ISBN 978-0-824-82472-3.
- Rigsby, Bruce (1965). Linguistic Relations in the Southern Plateau, PhD dissertation. University of Oregon.
- Rigsby, Bruce (2016). "Emeritus Professor Bruce Rigsby:Profile". University of Queensland.
- Thompson, Laurernce C. (2013). "The Northwest". In Sebeok, Thomas (ed.). Native Languages of the Americas. Springer. pp. 359–425. ISBN 978-1-475-71559-0.
- Verstraete, Christophe; Rigsby, Bruce (2015). A Grammar and Lexicon of Yintyingka. Walter de Gruyter. ISBN 978-1-614-51900-3.
- "Emeritus Professor Bruce Rigsby Festschrift Launch". YouTube. 27 July 2015.
