= Night Island (Queensland) =

Island in Queensland, Australia

Coordinates: 13°22′05″S 143°34′37″E

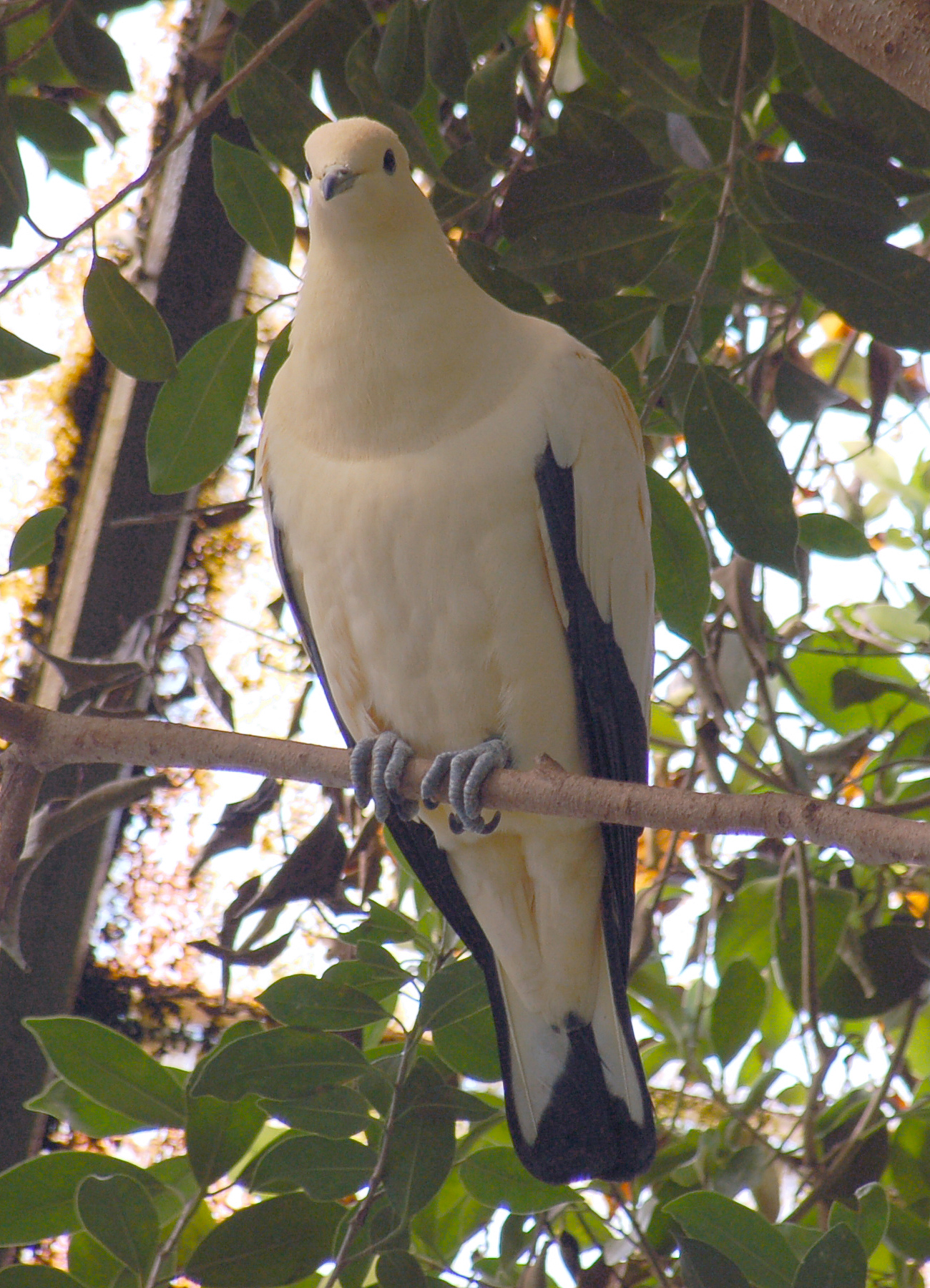
The island is an important breeding site for Pied Imperial-pigeons

Night Island is part of the Great Barrier Reef Marine Park west of Cape Melville, Queensland, Australia. It lies east of Coen between the first three-mile opening and the second three-mile opening of the Barrier Reef about 100 km south-east of Lockhart River. It is part of the Islands North of Port Stewart Important Bird Area. The indigenous people of the island were the Kawadji.

== Notes and references ==
=== References ===
- Tindale, Norman Barnett (1974). "Kawadji (QLD)". Aboriginal Tribes of Australia: Their Terrain, Environmental Controls, Distribution, Limits, and Proper Names. Australian National University Press. ISBN 978-0-708-10741-6.
