= Pakadji =

Aboriginal Australian people of the Cape York peninsula

The Pakadji people, also known by the southern tribal exonym as the Koko Yao (Kuuku Yaʼu), are an Aboriginal Australian group of Cape York Peninsula in northern Queensland. The ethnonym Koko Yaʼo is said literally to mean " talk, speech" (koko/kuku) 'this way' (yaʼo), though this has been questioned. (Note: Wood argues that Thomson's Demonstrative-based paradigm, though functional for several related languages, doesn't fit Kuku Wanju, and suggests that 'the names meant 'language which uses the form X' rather than 'like this'.')

== Language ==
Pakadji is one of the Umpila group of dialects within the North Cape York Paman languages. They had a highly developed sign language, but used generally only one hand, with rapid movements, and little secondary reinforcement by physical or facial tics or gestures.

== Country ==
Pakadji territory embraced roughly an area of 1,300 sq. miles around Weymouth Bay, the Pascoe River, and Temple Bay. It reached northwards as far as Cape Grenville; and ran to the southeast at Cape Weymouth. Inland it extended to the Dividing Range.

== Lifestyle and economy ==
The Pakadji were one of the Kawadji, or sandbeach people. These coastal tribes basically exploited the rich food resources on and off the sea-line facing the Coral Sea. The year was divided into two seasons, the kawali or dry season that began with the onset of the south-east trade winds, from April through to November, and wullo wantjan/wullo waiyin ('when thunder cries') the season ushered in with the arrival of the northwest monsoon, beginning in late November/early December. In the kawali period they were often venture inland to harvest vegetables (mai'yi), yams (dampu) and bush honey, and construction materials like spear wood and weaving grasses.

== Ceremonies ==
Donald Thomson gained the confidence of the Pakadji while spending 4 months with them during the season in which their initiation ceremonies (Okainta) were held, and was permitted to be present during the rites. He focused in particular on stories related to Iwayi (Old Man Crocodile).

== Native title ==
On 25 November 2021, 1,202 km^{2} (464 sq mi) of land on the eastern side of the Cape York Peninsula were handed back to the Kuuku Ya'u people, at the same time as (986 km^{2} (381 sq mi) were awarded to the Uutaalnganu people, in a native title claim that was lodged seven years prior. The landmark ruling was delivered by Justice Debra Mortimer of the Federal Court of Australia, sitting at the Supreme Court of Queensland in Cairns.

== Some words ==
- papa (mother)
