= Kaantju =

Aboriginal Australian people of Queensland

The Kaantju (alternate spellings Kaantyu, Kandju and Kaanyu) people are an Aboriginal Australian people of the Cape York Peninsula in north Queensland. They live in the area around the present-day town of Coen. Most of their traditional tribal land has been taken over for cattle stations. Kaantju refers to the hook of the yuli, their word for woomera.

== Language ==
The Kaantyu language is a dialect, with northern and southern varieties, of Umpila.

== Ecology ==
The Kantyu live in the foothills of the Great Dividing Range along and around the upper tributaries of the Archer River, and the Watson river to the north, and the Edward southwards, from the junction of the Coen and Archer rivers to the mouth of the Archer and the junction of the Kendall and Holroyd extending over approximately 3,000 square miles (7,800 km^{2}). To their west they were separated from the coastal waters of the gulf of Carpentaria by the Wik-Natera and Wik-Kalkan tribes. To their south, along the Coleman River were the Bakanu and the Kunjen speaking Olkola.

== Social relations ==
The Kaantju intermarried with the Wik Ayabadhu people who lived on the upper reaches of the Holroyd, and traditionally held ceremonial gatherings with them, and the Wik-Mungkan, at the site where Pretender river meets the Holroyd at the junction of the Pretender and Holroyd.

== History ==
The laying of the Queensland Cape York telegraph line ran through the hunting grounds of both the Kaantju and Kokiala tribes, and had a large impact on their survival. While the Kokiala died off, the Kaantju set up camps along the line, near cattle stations, or retreated to those parts of the range where one could hunt or fish in peace.

== Totem system and ceremonial sites ==
The rudiments of the Kaantyu ceremonial system were first picked up by Ursula McConnel who gathered scraps of information from two elders of the tribe whom she described as being in their 'dotage', a remnant of the tribe whose traditional social organization had already largely disintegrated due to the pressure of white colonization of their lands and their transformation into cattle stations. McConnel considered their totem system not markedly different from that of the Wik-Mungkan. He believed that it had extended into the Torres Strait where, however, it had been undermined by the growth of New Guinean hero cults. The mainland systems were based on ceremonies for the ritual incentivation of increase, that is, to ensure nature would renew its nourishing sources, something that, on the Torres Strait, had been weakened by the spread of native gardens and fishing.

The elders interviewed by McConnel referred to two ceremonial sites (auwa) close to Coen. One was situated on the Emily Creek six miles from the town centre, the other a half a mile from the police station. The at Emily Creek ritual centre was based on the red kangaroo totem, and consisted on a long parade of upright stones varying from a few centimetres to some as high as 2 to 3 feet. The order appear, to McConnel, to parallel that of the ant-beds at the bream and cuscus auwa of the Wik-Mungkan, the difference being explained as due to the lack of suitable stone-ware in the territory of the latter. By maintaining such increase rituals, for example that of the rock-cod, it was thought that they would spread through all the creeks and rivers, and thereby guarantee to the tribe in the area an abundance of this fish species.

== Sources ==
- Dixon, Robert M. W. (2002). Australian Languages: Their Nature and Development. Vol. 1. Cambridge University Press. ISBN 978-0-521-47378-1.
- Greer, Shelley; McIntyre-Tamwoy, Susan; Henry, Rosita (2011). "Sentinel Sites in a cosmo-political seascape" (PDF). pp. 2–10. Archived from the original (PDF) on 31 October 2016.
- McConnel, Ursula (April 1930a). "The Wik-Munkan Tribe of Cape York Peninsula". Oceania. 1 (1): 97–104. doi:10.1002/j.1834-4461.1930.tb00005.x. JSTOR 40373036.
- McConnel, Ursula (July 1930b). "The Wik-Munkan Tribe. Part II. Totemism". Oceania. 1 (2): 181–205. doi:10.1002/j.1834-4461.1930.tb01644.x. JSTOR 40327320.
- McConnel, Ursula (March 1932). "Totem stones of the Kantyu tribe, Cape York Peninsula, North Queensland". Oceania. 2 (3): 292–295. doi:10.1002/j.1834-4461.1932.tb00030.x. JSTOR 27976149.
- Thomson, Donald F. (1933). "The Hero Cult, Initiation and Totemism on Cape York". The Journal of the Royal Anthropological Institute of Great Britain and Ireland. 63: 453–537. doi:10.2307/2843801. JSTOR 2843801.
