= KWM =

KWM may refer to:

- King & Wood Mallesons, a multinational law firm, headquartered in Hong Kong
- Kowanyama Airport, an airport southeast of Kowanyama, Queensland, Australia
- the previous name of KWin, a window manager for the X Window System
