= Edward River Airport =

Edward River Airport Pormpuraaw Airport
- IATA: EDR; ICAO: YPMP

Summary
- Airport type: Public
- Operator: Pormpuraaw Aboriginal Shire Council
- Location: Pormpuraaw, Queensland, Australia
- Elevation AMSL: 8 ft / 2 m
- Coordinates: 14°53′48″S 141°36′34″E

Map
- Location in Queensland

Runways
Direction	Length		Surface
Direction	m	ft	Surface
14/32	1,360	4,462	Asphalt
- Sources: Australian AIP and aerodrome chart

Edward River Airport (IATA: EDR, ICAO: YPMP) is an airport in Pormpuraaw, Queensland, Australia.

== Airlines and destinations ==
Airlines	Destinations
Skytrans Australia	Cairns, Kowanyama

== See also ==
- List of airports in Queensland
