= Coleman River (Queensland) =

River in Australia

Coleman
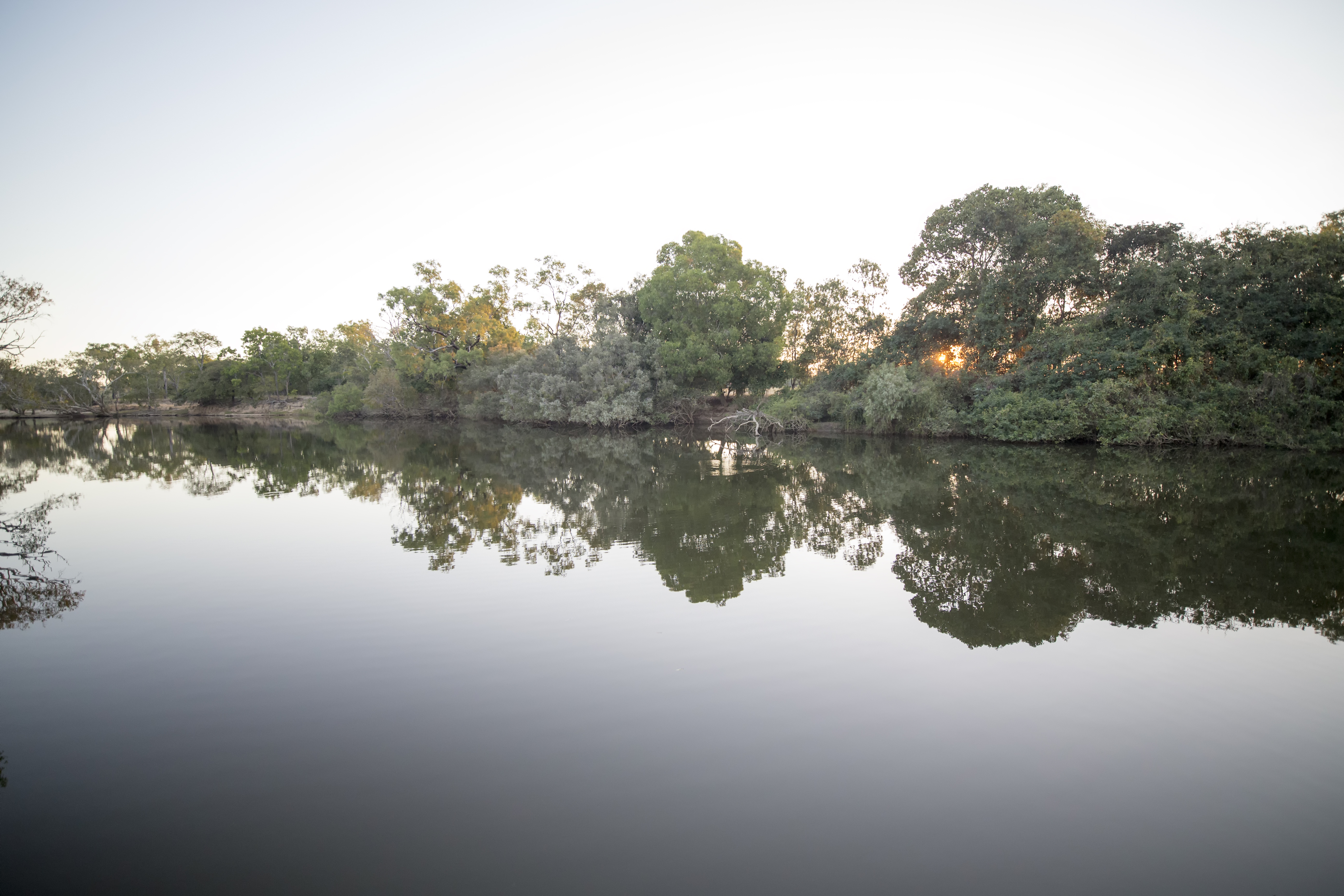

- Location of Coleman River mouth in Queensland

Location
- Country: Australia
- State: Queensland
- Region: Far North Queensland

Physical characteristics
- Source: Great Dividing Range
- Source confluence: Little Coleman River and Big Coleman River
  - location: under Lapunya Mount
  - elevation: 229 m (751 ft)
- Mouth: Gulf of Carpentaria
  - location: south of Pormpuraaw, Cape York
  - coordinates: 15°04′20″S 141°38′59″E
  - elevation: 0 m (0 ft)

Basin features
- Tributaries
  - right: King River (Queensland), Lukin River

The Coleman River is a river on the Cape York Peninsula in Far North Queensland, Australia.

== Course and features ==
Formed by the confluence of the Little Coleman River and Big Coleman River, the headwaters of the river rise under Lapunya Mount near The Lagoons in the Great Dividing Range and initially flows south. It flows past the Curlew Range and then turns west across the Boomerang Plain eventually discharging into the Gulf of Carpentaria between the mouth of the Mitchell River to the south and the settlement of Pormpuraaw to the north. From source to mouth, the Coleman River is joined by six tributaries including the King River and the Lukin River, and descends 234 metres (768 ft) over its 399-kilometre (248 mi) course.

The catchment includes the Edward River sub-basin, and area occupies 737.6 square kilometres (285 sq mi). It contains the towns of Bamboo, Edward River, Glen Garland, Strath-Haven, Strathgordon, Strathmay and Yarraden, which includes the abandoned locale of Ebagoola. The Archer River drainage basin bounds the catchment to the north and the Mitchell River Catchment to the south The river has a mean annual discharge of 520 gigalitres (680,100,000 cu yd).

A total of 46 species of fish have been found in the river, including: the sailfin glassfish, barred grunter, shovel-nosed catfish, bigeye trevally, fly-specked hardyhead, golden gudgeon, pennyfish, mouth almighty, barramundi, oxeye herring, rainbowfish and seven-spot archerfish.

== History ==
The Olkola people inhabited the basin for thousands of years.

Yir Yiront is an Australian Aboriginal language. Its traditional language region is in Western Cape York within the local government areas of Aboriginal Shire of Kowanyama and Shire of Cook, in the catchments of the Coleman River and Mitchell River. Following the removal of Aboriginal people from their traditional lands, it is also spoken in Pormpuraaw and Kowanyama.

The river was named by the explorer William Hann in 1872.

At the turn of the 20th century, a gold rush led to conflict with colonial Australians, resulting in several massacres of the Olkola. Between 2011 and 2014, the Olkola people negotiated a handback of traditionally held lands, part of which became Olkola National Park.

== See also ==
- List of rivers of Australia § Queensland
