= Kowanyama Airport =

Airport in Queensland, Australia

- IATA: KWM; ICAO: YKOW

Summary
- Airport type: Public
- Operator: Kowanyama Aboriginal Shire Council
- Location: Kowanyama, Queensland, Australia
- Elevation AMSL: 35 ft / 11 m
- Coordinates: 15°29′06″S 141°45′06″E

Map
- Location in Queensland

Runways
Direction	Length		Surface
Direction	m	ft	Surface
12/30	1,380	4,528	Asphalt
- Sources: Australian AIP and aerodrome chart

Kowanyama Airport (IATA: KWM, ICAO: YKOW) is an airport located 1 nautical mile (1.9 km; 1.2 mi) southeast of Kowanyama, Queensland, Australia. In 2005 the airport received $107,448 for security upgrades.

== Airlines and destinations ==
Airlines	Destinations
Skytrans Australia	Cairns, Pormpuraaw

== See also ==
- List of airports in Queensland
