= Pormpuraaw, Queensland =

Pormpuraaw
- Town
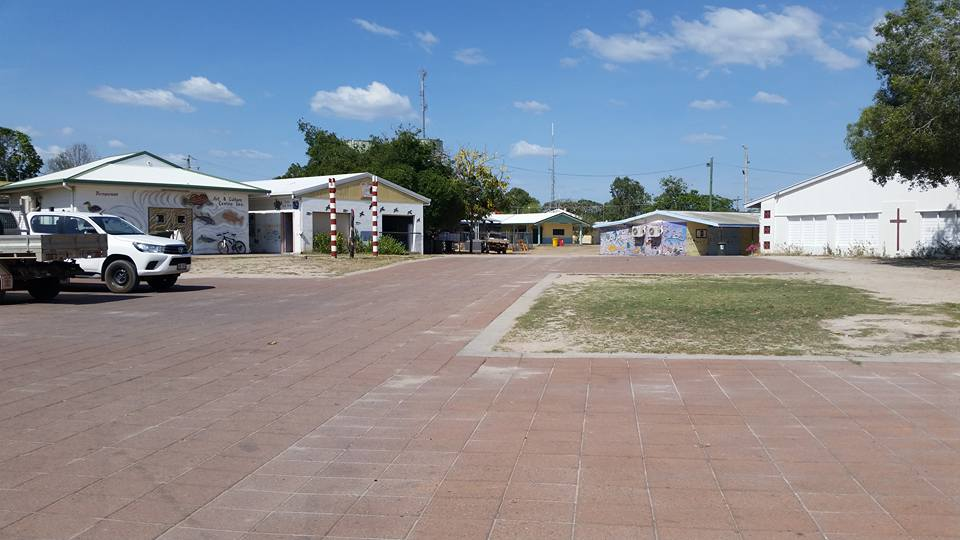
- Pormpuraaw, 2017

- Interactive map of Pormpuraaw
- Coordinates: 14.8979°S 141.6192°E
- Country: Australia
- State: Queensland
- LGA: Aboriginal Shire of Pormpuraaw
- Location: 291 km (181 mi) N of Kowanyama; 452 km (281 mi) NE of Normanton; 494 km (307 mi) W of Cooktown; 663 km (412 mi) NW of Cairns; 2,457 km (1,527 mi) NNW of Brisbane
- Established: 1938

Government
  - State electorate: Cook
  - Federal division: Leichhardt

Area
  - Total: 4,383.1 km^{2} (1,692.3 sq mi)

Population
  - Total: 611 (2021 census)
  - Density: 0.13940/km^{2} (0.36104/sq mi)
- Time zone: UTC+10:00 (AEST)
- Postcode: 4871
Localities around Pormpuraaw
Gulf of Carpentaria	Aurukun	Holroyd River
Gulf of Carpentaria	Pormpuraaw	Edward River
Gulf of Carpentaria	Kowanyama	Edward River

Pormpuraaw (pronounced pom-pu-ra) is a coastal town and a locality in the Aboriginal Shire of Pormpuraaw, Queensland, Australia. Pormpuraaw is an Aboriginal community situated on the west coast of Cape York Peninsula approximately halfway between Karumba and Weipa on the Edward River. It is 650 kilometres (400 mi) by road from Cairns. Pormpuraaw currently has a 4-man police station.

Formerly known as Edward River Aboriginal Mission, Pormpuraaw was an Anglican mission established in 1938. The people included Thaayorre, Wik, Pakanh and Yir Yoront. This was the third mission to be set up in the southwestern Cape York region. In 1967 control was passed from the church to the Queensland Department of Aboriginal and Islander Affairs. The community received Deed of Grant in Trust status, and is governed by a community council. Pormpuraaw has been successful in developing a commercial crocodile farm, a cattle operation and some tourism.

In the 2021 census, the locality of Pormpuraaw had a population of 611 people.

== History ==
Pormpuraaw (Porrm-puur-ow) was previously known as Edward River Mission and is situated on the west coast of Cape York Peninsula between the Chapman River and Mungkan Creek. The community is home to two groups of Aboriginal Australian people, the Thaayorre (Thie-Orr) and the Wik-Mungkan peoples, and includes 16 outstations.

=== European contact ===
European settlement on Cape York began with the establishment of Somerset in 1865. The settlement was formed at the tip of Cape York Peninsula after a recommendation from the Queensland Governor Sir George Bowen that it would be a favourable location for a harbour of refuge and a well-positioned international trading port.

Frank and Alexander Jardine overlanded a herd of cattle to establish a pastoral station near Somerset to supply the settlement with meat. The Jardine brothers had several skirmishes with Aboriginal people on their journey to Cape York that culminated in what the Jardine brothers named the "Battle of the Mitchell". On arriving at the Mitchell River:

"Whilst the cattle halted … they came on to a number of blacks fishing, these immediately crossed to the other side, but on their return, swam across again in numbers, armed with large bundles of spears and some nullahs and met them ... The natives at first stood up courageously, but either by accident or through fear, despair or stupidity, they got huddled in a heap, in, and at the margin of the water, when ten carbines poured volley after volley into them from all directions, killing and wounding with every shot with very little return… About thirty being killed.'"

After this fatal encounter, the Jardine brothers continued north, crossing the Coleman and Edward rivers and on to Somerset. Gold mining brought further European settlement to Cape York, after William Hann's expedition found gold on the Palmer River in 1872. In 1876, Robert Sefton found gold while prospecting at the Coen River. His return to Cooktown with 140 ounces in 1878 prompted a subsequent gold rush in Coen.

The town of Normanton was established by 1868, and a Native Police detachment was stationed there shortly afterwards. Native Police camps were established at Highbury in 1885 and in Coen in 1888, which helped European settlement advance further into Cape York.

In 1874, the Mitchell River was considered as a potential location for a port to service the Palmer River Goldfields. The river was surveyed again in 1886, with a view to establishing a town to service the recently formed pastoral stations. However, neither of these surveys reportedly amounted to anything. In 1896, it was argued that, as the land from Albatross Bay down to the Gilbert River was not needed for European settlement, there was no need to establish a mission in the area.

In 1900, the Church of England created the Diocese of Carpentaria, based on Thursday Island. Securing a grant from the Queensland Government, Gilbert White (the first Bishop of the Diocese of Carpentaria), turned to Ernest Gribble for help in establishing a mission at Mitchell River. Gribble had considerable experience running the Yarrabah Mission near Cairns. The land was gazetted as an Aboriginal reserve on 10 January 1903. In 1905, Gribble, Bishop White and their staff established a permanent mission at Mitchell River.

In 1923, the Mitchell River Mission superintendent, Joseph Chapman, began to visit the large, semi-permanent Aboriginal camp at the mouth of the Edward River.

In 1924, The Queenslander reported that:

"On the Edward River 50 miles north of the Mitchell River station, there are about 150 Aboriginals, who have had little association with whites. They live close to the sea, and behind them is a stretch of desert country, so that their habitation is more or less permanent. They have shown a decided tendency in the direction of agriculture, and any seeds given them have been cared for and planted. A Mission station has been started for the care and instruction of these people".

Chapman continued to visit the site during the 1920s, but the establishment of a permanent mission station was stalled because the Diocese of Carpentaria was unable to find the necessary funds. Chapman was keen to extend the missionary influence to the Edward River, to block attempts to have the area thrown open to pastoral selection. Anglican missionary, Walter Daniels, attempted to establish a mission station at Coleman River during 1932, but this attempt also failed. In 1939, Joseph Chapman returned to the Edward River to establish a permanent mission station.

By the late 1940s, the mission had a population of 301. The mission was largely self-sufficient with palm leaf houses and a farm that grew bananas, palms, sweet potatoes, yams, sugar cane and kitchen vegetables. The Aboriginal residents built fish traps and canoes that were used to supply the mission with fish. In 1950, cattle were introduced for meat, after 20 square miles of the reserve was fenced.

Under the Aboriginal Protection and Restriction of the Sale of Opium Act 1897, which granted the Home Secretary the power "to cause Aboriginals within any district to be removed to and kept within the limits of any reserve situated in the same or any other district"; there were 11 recorded removals from Edward River Mission to Palm Island.

In the early days of the mission, the children were sent to Mitchell River Mission School. In 1950, a school was constructed at the Edward River Mission, and Reverend Brown commenced service as the teacher. By 1953, 32 students were enrolled, mostly young children. The older Edward River children continued to go to Mitchell River Mission and, into the 1960s, were still being housed in the Mitchell River dormitories for the purpose of schooling.

St Mary and St Edward the Confessor Anglican Church opened in 1950. Following cyclone damage in 1964, it was demolished. The construction of a new brick church was commenced in 1969, but did not open until circa December 1971.

In January 1952, the mission was hit by a cyclone and every building except the superintendent's house was either blown down or badly damaged. It took several years for the mission to be completely rebuilt.

In 1956, a cattle manager was appointed to establish a herd of mixed breeding cattle. Cattle produced were used for domestic consumption and the surplus sent to Mitchell River to be sold with their cattle. By 1964, cattle-raising was the main industry of the mission, which was run by Aboriginal stockmen supervised by head stockman, Jim Kendall.

Mission superintendent, Joseph Chapman, returned to Mitchell River Mission in 1957 and was replaced by Reverend Pidsley, who was subsequently replaced by Gordon Green in 1958.

In 1958, the southern part of the Aurukun reserve was added to the Edward River reserve, after an agreement was reached between the Presbyterian Church (which ran the Aurukun Mission) and the Anglican Church (which ran the Edward River Mission). This effectively doubled the size of the Edward River Reserve from 554,880 acres to 1,152,000 acres.

In 1966, the Anglican Church approached the government to take control of the mission. Responsibility for the mission was handed over to the Queensland Government on 1 May 1967.

In 1971, a pilot crocodile breeding research project was established in the area. In 1972, a crocodile farm was established with Australian Government funding by Applied Ecology Pty Ltd. By 1975, the farm contained 1,012 crocodiles.

Pormpuraaw State School opened in 1973.

=== Local government ===
On 30 March 1985, the Edward River community elected 5 councillors to constitute an autonomous Edward River Aboriginal Council established under the Community Services (Aborigines) Act 1984. The Act conferred local government type powers and responsibilities upon Aboriginal councils for the first time.

On 23 July 1987 the council area, previously an Aboriginal reserve held by the Queensland Government, was transferred to the trusteeship of the council under a Deed of Grant in Trust. Also in 1987, the Edward River Mission community changed its name to Pormpuraaw, taken from a local dreamtime story in the Kuuk Thaayorre language of the Thaayorre people, about a burnt hut or "Pormpur".

On 1 January 2005, under the Local Government (Community Government Areas) Act 2004, Pormpuraaw Aboriginal Council became the Pormpuraaw Aboriginal Shire Council.

== Demographics ==
In the 2006 census, the town of Pormpuraaw had a population of 600 people, with 536 of them being Indigenous.

In the 2016 census, the locality of Pormpuraaw had a population of 749 people, 83% of whom were Aboriginal and/or Torres Strait Islander people.

In the 2021 census, the locality of Pormpuraaw had a population of 611 people, 78.4% of whom were Aboriginal and/or Torres Strait Islander people.

== Language ==
Stanford cognitive psychologist, Dr. Lera Boroditsky, studied the language of the people in Pormpuraaw, Kuuk Thaayorre, due to its unique way of using cardinal directions instead of the more common 'left' and 'right' to explain direction. She explores the people's ability to always know where true North lies, as well as the effect of this directional understanding on the language. She discussed her findings on an episode of NPR's Radiolab.

Yir Yiront (also known as Yiront, Jirjoront, Yir-yiront, and Kokomindjan) is an Australian Aboriginal language. Its traditional language region is in Western Cape York within the local government areas of Aboriginal Shire of Kowanyama and Shire of Cook, in the catchments of the Coleman River and Mitchell River. Following the removal of Aboriginal people from their traditional lands, it is also spoken in Pormpuraaw and Kowanyama.

== Education ==
Pormpuraaw State School is a government primary (Early Childhood-6) school for boys and girls at Pormpuraaw Street (14.8987°S 141.6209°E). In 2018, the school had an enrolment of 83 students with 7 teachers (6 full-time equivalent) and 8 non-teaching staff (5 full-time equivalent). It includes a special education program. There are no secondary schools in Pormpuraaw, nor nearby. The alternatives are distance education and boarding school.

== Utilities ==
Electricity is supplied by a generator. Electricity is paid up front via the use of power cards which are purchased from the Coffee Shop and Australia Post Post Office. Power is very expensive with an average cost of A$40 to A$45 per week when running air conditioners.

Town water is supplied by a bore and pumped into tanks. The water is of reasonable quality and high in minerals which gives it a strong flavour. Both police residences have rain water tanks that are suitable for drinking. Water pressure from both water sources is low.

Sewage is by pumping stations to settling ponds.

== Facilities ==
The Pormpuraaw Aboriginal Shire Council operates the Thaayorre-Munkan Library located at Thaayorre-Munkan Library and Arts and Crafts Gallery, Pormpuraaw Street, Pormpuraaw.

There is a women's refuge called Pormpur Paanthu, meaning "women's house", which was established in 1991/1992 after cousins Myrtle Foote and May Ballie lobbied the council, having been taking in female victims of domestic violence into their homes for some time previously. In October 2020 the two women won the Local Government Association of Queensland's inaugural Alison Woolla Memorial Award. The award was named after Wik woman Alison Woolla, first female mayor of Aurukun.

St Mary and St Edward Anglican Church is at 175 Matpi Street (14.899888°S 141.619°E).

There is a barge/boat ramp on the north bank of the Chapman River (14.9174°S 141.6219°E). It is managed by the Pormpuraaw Aboriginal Shire Council.

== Medical ==
The Far Northern regional Health Authority operates the Pormpuraaw Primary Health Clinic which is open during business hours on Monday to Saturday and after hours for emergencies. There is no doctor or dentist within town. The Royal Flying Doctor Service attends once a week and the dentist once every two to three months. The Royal Flying Doctor will also attend for emergencies. The hospital operates with four registered nurses and four locally recruited health workers.

== Shopping ==
There are two shops within the town. One is operated six days a week and owned by Community Enterprise Queensland. The other shop is smaller and operates five days a week and is owned by the Anglican Church.

Fresh fruit, vegetables and milk come in weekly via truck during the dry and plane during the wet season. Prices are high compared to the cities.

There are no clothing stores or hairdressers.

Petrol can be purchased from the council workshop during business hours. Prices are very high.

== See also ==
- Edward River Airport
