= Kowanyama, Queensland =

Kowanyama
- Town
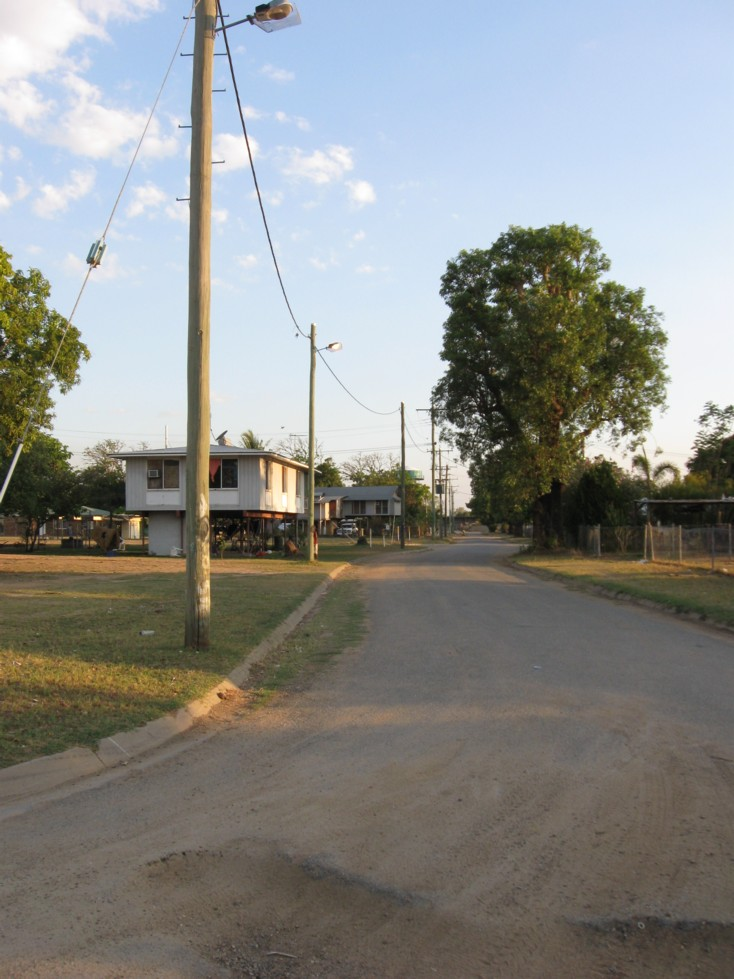
- View down Ogimburngk St (from Gilbert St)

- Interactive map of Kowanyama
- Coordinates: 15.4796°S 141.7419°E
- Country: Australia
- State: Queensland
- LGA: Aboriginal Shire of Kowanyama
- Location: 291 km (181 mi) S of Pormpuraaw; 361 km (224 mi) NNW of Normanton; 606 km (377 mi) NW of Cairns; 2,231 km (1,386 mi) NW of Brisbane

Government
  - State electorate: Cook
  - Federal division: Leichhardt

Area
  - Total: 2,524.9 km^{2} (974.9 sq mi)

Population
  - Total: 1,079 (2021 census)
  - Density: 0.42734/km^{2} (1.1068/sq mi)
- Time zone: UTC+10:00 (AEST)
- Postcode: 4892
Localities around Kowanyama
Gulf of Carpentaria	Pormpuraaw	Edward River
Gulf of Carpentaria	Kowanyama	Maramie
Gulf of Carpentaria	Yagoonya	Maramie

Kowanyama is a town and coastal locality in the Aboriginal Shire of Kowanyama, Queensland, Australia. It is the site of the former Mitchell River Mission, founded in 1916, after the nearby Trubanamen Mission (established not far away on Topsy Creek in 1905) was abandoned. In the 2021 census, the locality of Kowanyama had a population of 1,079 people.

== Geography ==
The locality is on the Cape York Peninsula. It is bounded to the west by the Gulf of Carpentaria and to the north by the Coleman River (15.0700°S 141.6483°E).

The locality of Kowanyama (and the Aboriginal Shire of Kowanyama which has the same boundaries) has a land area of 2,524.9 km^{2} (974.9 sq mi).

The Mitchell River enters the locality from the west (Maramie) and exits to the north-west into the Gulf of Carpentaria. As the river approaches the Gulf, it splits into two watercourses around Wallaby Island (15.2002°S 141.6502°E) with the southern branch retaining the name Mitchell River (with mouth 15.1986°S 141.5914°E) and the northern branch called Mitchell River (North Arm) entering the gulf at 15.0983°S 141.6386°E.

The community is situated on the banks of the Magnificent Creek, a tributary of the Mitchell River, 20 kilometres (12 mi) inland from the coastline of the Gulf of Carpentaria.

Kowanyama is accessed by an all-weather airstrip, as well as unsealed roads in the dry season from Pormpuraaw to the north, Normanton to the south and Cairns to the east.

== History ==
Kunjen (also known as Koko Wanggara, Ngundjan and Olkola) is a language of Western Cape York. The Kunjen language region includes the landscape within the local government boundaries of Kowanyama Community Council and Cook Shire Council.

The name Kowanyama means "the place of many waters".

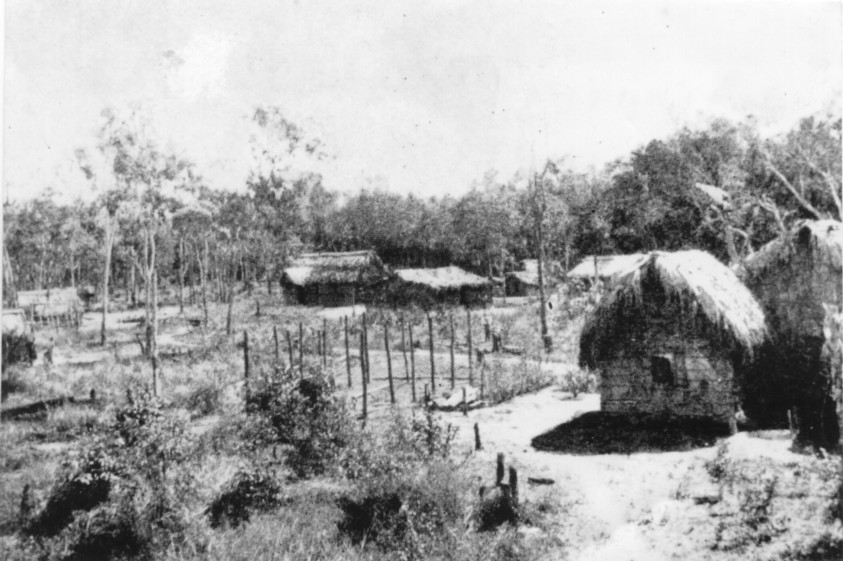
Kowanyama, June 1919

Kowanyama State School opened in January 1904. Since the beginning of 2014, the school has also started to enrol students in a year 11 and 12 pathways program.

In 1905, Trubanamen Mission was established inland on Topsy Creek, and Aboriginal peoples of the region were gradually drawn from their ancestral lands into the mission settlement. Later, in 1916, Mitchell River Mission was founded on the present site of Kowanyama and the Trubanamen site abandoned. Some people continued to live on their traditional lands, only moving into Kowanyama in the 1940s.

In 1964, Tropical Cyclone Dora destroyed the mission. The Queensland Government funded the rebuilding.

Kowanyama Post Office opened by 1967.

In 1967 the Anglican church were no longer able to sustain their activities in the area as a Church Mission. The Department of Aboriginal and Islander Affairs, a government department, under the Act continued running the affairs of the community.

In July 1987, the State Government of Queensland implemented legislation for a DOGIT (Deed of Grant in Trust) over the lands in the Mitchell River delta, an area of 250 square kilometres (97 sq mi). The deed covered the traditional lands of the people of Kowanyama. Like other DOGIT communities of the time, Kowanyama had a town Council elected by Aboriginal people living in the community. The newly formed Kowanyama Council assumed responsibility for implementing certain conditions of the DOGIT. Seven elected aboriginal residents hold three-year terms in office.

Since the 1990s, many Kowanyama people have been returning to their ancestral lands through the Homelands Movement.

Other homelands, including the Oriners Pastoral Lease and the Sefton Pastoral Lease, were independently purchased by the Kowanyama Council and are located outside the DOGIT boundary.

== Demographics ==
In the 2006 census, the town of Kowanyama had a population of 1,017 people.

In the 2016 census, the locality of Kowanyama had a population of 944 people.

In the 2021 census, the locality of Kowanyama had a population of 1,079 people.

== Culture ==
Kowanyama is one of the largest communities on the Cape York Peninsula. Kowanyama's Aboriginal people continue to identify strongly with their ancestral countries and with the languages, stories, songs, dances, and histories associated with those countries. Language groups associated with countries in the Kowanyama region are Yir Yoront, Yirrk Thangalkl, Koko Bera, Uw Oykangand, and Olkola.

== Education ==
Kowanyama State School is a government primary and secondary (Early Childhood-10) school for boys and girls at 345 Kowanyama Street (15.4721°S 141.7451°E). In 2018, the school had an enrolment of 190 students with 21 teachers and 3 non-teaching staff. It includes a special education program.

Secondary education to Year 12 is not available in Kowanyama nor nearby. Distance education and boarding schools are the alternatives.

== Alcohol restrictions ==
Kowanyama community is subject to strict alcohol restrictions enforced by police prohibiting individuals holding any alcohol, and prohibiting any vehicles carrying alcohol anywhere within the community.

Kowanyama Aboriginal Shire Council originally held a liquor licence allowing light beer to be consumed on the premises of the Kowanyama Canteen at specified times, but this was suspended by Queensland's Liquor Licensing Commission and Queensland Treasurer, Andrew Fraser, in February 2008.

The decision to suspend Kowanyama Aboriginal Shire Council's liquor licence is claimed to have resulted in the Council losing a business valued at $1.6 million, plus up to $120,000 in stock. As a consequence, on 30 October 2008, the Council went to Queensland's Supreme Court to challenge the liquor licensing decisions as racially discriminatory.

== Languages ==
Yir Yiront (also known as Yiront, Jirjoront, Yir-yiront, and Kokomindjan) is an Australian Aboriginal language. Its traditional language region is in Western Cape York within the local government areas of Aboriginal Shire of Kowanyama and Shire of Cook, in the catchments of the Coleman River and Mitchell River. Following the removal of Aboriginal people from their traditional lands, it is also spoken in Pormpuraaw and Kowanyama.

== Climate ==
Kowanyama has a tropical savannah climate (Köppen: Aw), with a short, intense wet season between December and March and a lengthy dry season from April to November with lower humidity and cooler nights. Although the average maxima exceeds 30.0 °C (86.0 °F) in all months, average minima significantly vary: from 15.7 °C (60.3 °F) in July to 24.5 °C (76.1 °F) in December. While rainfall averages 1,274.2 mm (50.17 in) annually, it is strongly concentrated in summer, exemplified by February 2014, when 1,470.6 mm (57.90 in) of rain fell. Extreme temperatures have ranged from 41.9 °C (107.4 °F) on 3 December 2019 to 4.5 °C (40.1 °F) on 3 August 1990.

Climate data for Kowanyama (15º28'48"S, 141º45'00"E, 10 m AMSL) (1965-2024 normals and extremes, rainfall 1912-2024)
Month	Jan	Feb	Mar	Apr	May	Jun	Jul	Aug	Sep	Oct	Nov	Dec	Year
Record high °C (°F)	39.5 (103.1)	38.5 (101.3)	38.0 (100.4)	37.4 (99.3)	36.5 (97.7)	35.6 (96.1)	35.6 (96.1)	37.5 (99.5)	40.2 (104.4)	41.0 (105.8)	41.5 (106.7)	41.9 (107.4)	41.9 (107.4)
Mean daily maximum °C (°F)	33.1 (91.6)	32.5 (90.5)	33.0 (91.4)	33.1 (91.6)	32.2 (90.0)	30.9 (87.6)	30.9 (87.6)	32.4 (90.3)	34.8 (94.6)	36.4 (97.5)	36.4 (97.5)	35.0 (95.0)	33.4 (92.1)
Mean daily minimum °C (°F)	24.4 (75.9)	24.3 (75.7)	23.9 (75.0)	22.0 (71.6)	19.2 (66.6)	16.5 (61.7)	15.7 (60.3)	16.4 (61.5)	19.1 (66.4)	22.1 (71.8)	24.2 (75.6)	24.5 (76.1)	21.0 (69.9)
Record low °C (°F)	17.2 (63.0)	16.5 (61.7)	13.3 (55.9)	12.9 (55.2)	8.5 (47.3)	5.9 (42.6)	4.9 (40.8)	4.5 (40.1)	9.0 (48.2)	11.0 (51.8)	13.7 (56.7)	14.6 (58.3)	4.5 (40.1)
Average precipitation mm (inches)	345.9 (13.62)	363.1 (14.30)	238.1 (9.37)	54.7 (2.15)	11.0 (0.43)	4.2 (0.17)	2.4 (0.09)	2.2 (0.09)	2.4 (0.09)	16.3 (0.64)	56.3 (2.22)	179.7 (7.07)	1,274.2 (50.17)
Average precipitation days (≥ 1.0 mm)	15.7	15.7	12.2	3.9	0.8	0.5	0.4	0.2	0.3	1.2	3.8	9.7	64.4
Average afternoon relative humidity (%)	66	69	61	51	44	40	36	33	32	35	43	55	47
Average dew point °C (°F)	23.7 (74.7)	24.1 (75.4)	22.8 (73.0)	20.0 (68.0)	17.0 (62.6)	14.3 (57.7)	12.7 (54.9)	12.4 (54.3)	13.7 (56.7)	16.3 (61.3)	19.2 (66.6)	21.9 (71.4)	18.2 (64.7)
Source: Bureau of Meteorology (1965-2024 normals and extremes, rainfall to 1912)

== Travel ==
Kowanyama is serviced weekly in the dry season by road trains from Cairns. The service becomes more frequent as the wet season approaches.

Early storms in October can make the 400-kilometre (250 mi) dirt road to Chillagoe east of the community subject to flooding. By late December the storms of the monsoons have usually arrived, isolating the community by road.

The monsoons are regarded as the arrival of nhawrr yirrpa, the Rainbow Snake who brings the life giving water to the land. During the wet season, which may last until May, the community is serviced only by aircraft, as all other access is restricted. During the wet season, fresh foods and perishables are flown into the community each week on charter planes by stores in town. Airline passenger services to Cairns, 600 kilometres (370 mi) away is maintained throughout the year through Kowanyama Airport (15.4854°S 141.7526°E).

== See also ==
- Aboriginal Shire of Kowanyama
- Yir-Yoront language
