= Aboriginal Shire of Kowanyama =

Coordinates: 15°28′47″S 141°44′31″E

- Local government area
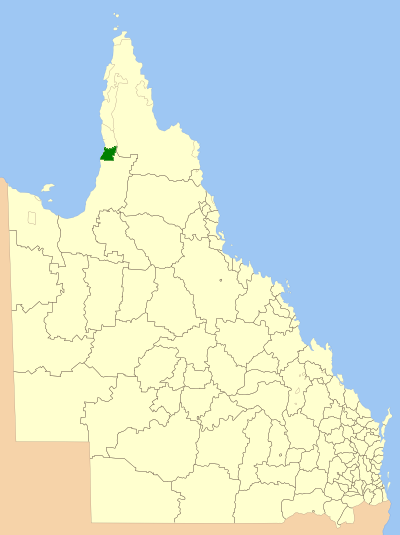
- Location within Queensland

- Interactive map of Aboriginal Shire of Kowanyama
- Country: Australia
- State: Queensland
- Region: Cape York
- Established: 1987
- Council seat: Kowanyama

Government
  - Mayor: Robert Michael Sands
  - State electorate: Cook
  - Federal division: Leichhardt

Area
  - Total: 2,555 km^{2} (986 sq mi)

Population
  - Total: 1,079 (2021 census)
  - Density: 0.42231/km^{2} (1.0938/sq mi)
- Website: Aboriginal Shire of Kowanyama
LGAs around Aboriginal Shire of Kowanyama
Gulf of Carpentaria	Pormpuraaw	Cook
Gulf of Carpentaria	Aboriginal Shire of Kowanyama	Carpentaria
Carpentaria	Carpentaria	Carpentaria

The Aboriginal Shire of Kowanyama is a special local government area which is located on western Cape York Peninsula in Queensland, Australia. It is managed under a Deed of Grant in Trust for the benefit of Aboriginal people under the Local Government (Community Government Areas) Act 2004.

In the 2021 census, the Aboriginal Shire of Kowanyama had a population of 1,079 people.

== History ==
The area originally was set up as the Mitchell River Mission in 1916. Aboriginal people from the region were gradually drawn from their traditional lands into the mission settlement. Language groups associated with countries in the Kowanyama region are Yir-Yoront, Yirrk Thangalkl, Koko Bera and Kunjen (Uw Oykangand and Olkola dialects).

Kunjen (also known as Koko Wanggara, Ngundjan and Olkola) is a language of Western Cape York. The Kunjen language region includes the landscape within the local government boundaries of Kowanyama Community Council and Cook Shire Council.

Yir Yiront (also known as Yiront, Jirjoront, Yir-yiront, and Kokomindjan) is an Australian Aboriginal language. Its traditional language region is in Western Cape York within the local government areas of Aboriginal Shire of Kowanyama and Shire of Cook, in the catchments of the Coleman River and Mitchell River. Following the removal of Aboriginal people from their traditional lands, it is also spoken in Pormpuraaw and Kowanyama.

In 1967 the Anglican church were no longer able to sustain their activities in the area as a Church Mission. The Department of Aboriginal and Islander Affairs, a government department, under the Act continued running the affairs of the community.

On 23 July 1987, under the Community Services (Aborigines) Act 1984, a Deed of Grant in Trust was given to the Kowanyama community over the lands in the Mitchell River delta. Like other DOGIT communities of the time, Kowanyama had a town Council elected by Aboriginal people living in the community. The newly formed Kowanyama Council assumed responsibility for implementing certain conditions of the DOGIT. Seven elected Aboriginal residents hold three year terms in office.

== Demographics ==
In the 2016 census, the Aboriginal Shire of Kowanyama had a population of 944 people.

In the 2021 census, the Aboriginal Shire of Kowanyama had a population of 1,079 people.

== Responsibilities ==
As the Shire operates under the Local Government Act 2009, the Shire Council's responsibilities are the generally the same as other local government in remote Queensland including for fisheries, the alcohol management and even operation of some commercial enterprises.

== Community Justice Group ==
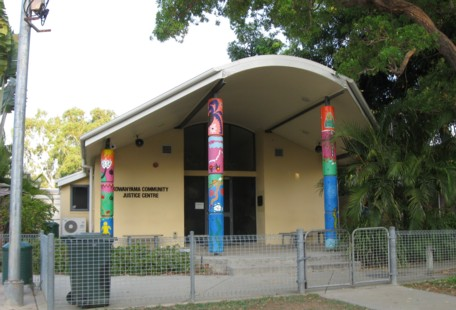
Front view of Kowanyama Community Justice Group's 'Courthouse'

A Community Justice Group operates within Kowanyama. This group is made up of respected members in the community. They meet to discuss issues within the town and make recommendations to Council.

The community also has a Council of Elders, who are consulted by the Kowanyama Council when making community decisions. The elders operate in conjunction with the Lands Office.

== The Lands Office ==
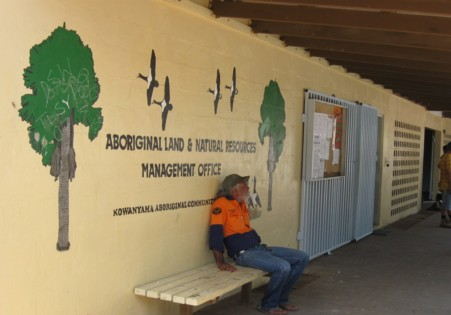
Front view of Kowanyama Land and Natural Resource Management office, Gilbert St

The Kowanyama Aboriginal Land and Natural Resources Management Office (KALNRMO) works to promote and facilitate aboriginal management of the natural and cultural resources of Kowanyama country by the people of Kowanyama. Through community consultation and direction, KALNRMO has developed a community development agenda for the Kowanyama region, including:

- Homelands development
- Land and Fisheries Management
- 'Tourism and Visitor management
- Kowanyama Ranger Service
- Native Title Claims
- Cultural Resource documentation

Through the initiatives of KALNRMO, the Kowanyama community is widely regarded as a leader in indigenous land management issues. Since 1987, Kowanyama has effected substantial local control over fishing in the Mitchell River Delta, including the closure of some waters to non-Aboriginal fishing under state fisheries legislation. This action, funded through the enterprise income of the Kowanyama Aboriginal Council, has provided Aboriginal people access to the River's fish stocks for their cultural and economic needs. In this way, Aboriginal people can fish and hunt as they have done for many thousands of years.

KALNRMO employs Indigenous rangers as part of a cultural and economic development programme. The Kowanyama Rangers implement land management strategies in many areas of the DOGIT, and, in addition to tourism and visitor management, patrol closed and open waters. The Rangers also observe fisheries regulations, especially for illegal commercial or recreational fishing in closed waters. Beginning in 2007, the Rangers monitor threatened turtle populations and participate in the Carpentaria Ghost Nets Programme to remove debris (primarily fishing nets) discarded into the Gulf of Carpentaria by commercial fishermen from Australia and Indonesia.

== Mayors ==
- 2008–2012: Thomas Farlane Hudson
- 2012–2016: Robert Holness
- 2016–2020 : Michael Yam
- 2020–present: Robert Michael Sands

== See also ==
- Kowanyama, Queensland
