= Aboriginal Shire of Pormpuraaw =

Coordinates: 14°53′53.28″S 141°37′10.08″E

- Local government area
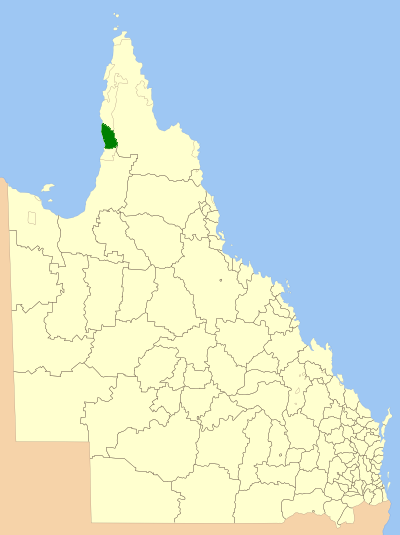
- Location within Queensland

- Interactive map of Aboriginal Shire of Pormpuraaw
- Country: Australia
- State: Queensland
- Region: Cape York
- Established: 1987
- Council seat: Pormpuraaw, Queensland

Government
  - Mayor: Richard Tarpencha
  - State electorate: Cook
  - Federal division: Leichhardt

Area
  - Total: 4,395 km^{2} (1,697 sq mi)

Population
  - Total: 611 (2021 census)
  - Density: 0.13902/km^{2} (0.3601/sq mi)
- Website: Aboriginal Shire of Pormpuraaw
LGAs around Aboriginal Shire of Pormpuraaw
Gulf of Carpentaria	Aurukun	Cook
Gulf of Carpentaria	Aboriginal Shire of Pormpuraaw	Cook
Kowanyama	Kowanyama	Cook

The Aboriginal Shire of Pormpuraaw is a special local government area which is located on western Cape York Peninsula in Queensland, Australia. It is managed under a Deed of Grant in Trust under the Local Government (Community Government Areas) Act 2004.

In the 2021 census, the Aboriginal Shire of Pormpuraaw had a population of 611 people.

== History ==
Kuuk Thaayorre (also known as Koko-Daiyuri, Kuku Yak, Thayorre, and used as a generic name for several related languages/dialects) is an Australian Aboriginal Language spoken on Western Cape York, particularly in the area around Pormpuraaw (Edward River). The Thaayorre language region includes the landscape within Pormpuraaw Community Council and the Cook Shire Council.

The area originally was set up as the Edward River Mission in 1938. Aboriginal people from the region were gradually drawn from their traditional lands into the mission settlement.

In 1967 the Anglican church were no longer able to sustain their activities in the area as a church mission. The Department of Aboriginal and Islander Affairs, a government department, under the Act continued running the affairs of the community.

On 28 July 1987, under the Community Services (Aborigines) Act 1984, a Deed of Grant in Trust (DOGIT) was given to the community. Like other DOGIT communities of the time, Pormpuraaw had a town council elected by Aboriginal people living in the community. The newly-formed Pormpuraaw Council assumed responsibility for implementing certain conditions of the DOGIT. Four elected Aboriginal residents plus a mayor hold four year terms of office.

== Demographics ==
In the 2016 census, the Aboriginal Shire of Pormpuraaw had a population of 749 people.

In the 2021 census, the Aboriginal Shire of Pormpuraaw had a population of 611 people.

== Responsibilities ==
As the Shire is not operated under the Local Government Act and operates the land on behalf of the community, the council's responsibilities are quite different from a typical local government body. This includes responsibility for fisheries, alcohol management, and even operation of some commercial enterprises.

The Pormpuraaw Shire Council operates an Indigenous Knowledge Centre (IKC) at Pormpuraaw. The Pormpuraaw IKC was the seventh IKC to open in 2002, the last for the year. The council owns and operates the IKC in partnership with State Library of Queensland. In 2019, the council requested support from the State Library to assist with refurbishing the space to create a more modern library environment for the community. The project was delayed by the COVID-19 pandemic; however in February 2021 it was reopened for community use.

== Chairs and mayors ==
- 2008–2016: Richard Tarpencha
- 2016–2020: Ralph Kendall
- 2020–present: Richard Tarpencha

== Current councillors ==
2020 – Councillors: Tim Koo-Aga, George Conrad, Andrea Foote & Ronald Kingi Jnr
