= Edward River (Queensland) =

River in Queensland, Australia

Edward
- Location of Edward River mouth in Queensland
- Etymology: Dr Edward Embley

Location
- Country: Australia
- State: Queensland
- Region: Far North Queensland

Physical characteristics
- Source: Great Dividing Range
  - location: Curlew Range
  - coordinates: 14°34′4″S 142°56′38″E
  - elevation: 114 m (374 ft)
- Mouth: Gulf of Carpentaria
  - location: Pormpuraaw
  - coordinates: 14°51′1″S 141°35′26″E
  - elevation: 0 m (0 ft)
- Length: 208 km (129 mi)
- Basin size: 7,521 km^{2} (2,904 sq mi)

Basin features
- Tributaries
  - left: Mistake Creek
  - right: The Overflow, Melonhole Creek

The Edward River is a river in Far North Queensland, Australia.

The headwaters of the river rise in the Curlew Range in the Great Dividing Range and flow in a westerly direction. The river flows across mostly uninhabited plains country and discharges into the Gulf of Carpentaria. The mouth of the Edward River is located on the western shore of Cape York Peninsula, the eastern edge of the Gulf of Carpentaria. The river descends 144 metres (472 ft) over its 208-kilometre (129 mi) course.

The drainage basin of the river occupies an area of 7,521 square kilometres (2,904 sq mi) of which an area of 167 square kilometres (64 sq mi) is made up of estuarine wetlands.

The township of Pormpuraaw, formerly known as the remote Aboriginal community of Edward River with a population of approximately 350 to 380 people, is located 6.5 kilometres (4 mi) south-southeast of the river mouth.

The river was named by the surveyor, John Thomas Embley, in 1884 after his brother Dr Edward Henry Embley who worked as an anaesthetist in Melbourne.

== See also ==
- List of rivers of Australia § Queensland
