= Kokangol =

Aboriginal Australian people

The Kokangol (Koko-Gol), or Yuwula, are said to have been an Indigenous Australian people of Queensland. Some dispute this, suggesting the name may be a synonym for Aghu Tharnggala, or may simply be the name of a language consultant.

== Country ==
The Kokangol were, in Norman Tindale's estimation, a distinct people from their neighbours, the Olkola, and lived on the Upper Alice River. Their territory extended over some 1,800 sq-miles, and they lived inland from the Yir-Yoront.

== People ==
The original population was estimated in 1897 to be around 600 people. There are very few explicit references to these people, apart from William Parry-Okeden 's report and passing mention in a volume on Queensland aboriginal rock-art by Percy Trezise and Dick Roughsey.

== Alternative names ==
- Koko-Gol
- Kookakolkoloa
- Juwula (language name)
- Oco-carnigal
- Aj juwalnga
- Galbawa
- Kalpawa
- Kookakolkoloa
- Owonmunga

== Notes and references ==
=== References ===
- Parry-Okeden, William (1897). Report on the north Queensland Aborigines and the Native Police with appendices. Vol. 2. Edmond Gregory, government printer. pp. 23–42.
- Simmons, R. T.; Graydon, J. J.; Gajdusek, D. C. (March 1958). "A blood group genetical survey in Australian aboriginal children of the Cape York Peninsula". American Journal of Physical Anthropology. 16 (1): 59–77. doi:10.1002/ajpa.1330160105. PMID 13571399.
- Tindale, Norman Barnett (1974). "Kokangol (QLD)". Aboriginal Tribes of Australia: Their Terrain, Environmental Controls, Distribution, Limits, and Proper Names. Australian National University Press. ISBN 978-0-708-10741-6.
- Trezise, Percy; Roughsey, Dick (1969). Quinkan Country. Adventures in search of aboriginal cave paintings in Cape York. Reed Australia.
