= Thaayorre =

Aboriginal Australian people

Total population
- 350 (2006)

Regions with significant populations
- Australia

Languages
- Kuuk Thaayorre, English

Related ethnic groups
- Yir-Yoront, Yirrk-Thangalkl, Koko Bera, Uw Olkola, Uw Oykangand

The Thaayorre, or Kuuk Thaayore, are an Australian people living on the southwestern part of the Cape York Peninsula, Queensland in Australia, primarily in the settlement Pormpuraaw, having its foundation in the Edward River Mission.

== Language ==
Kuuk Thaayorre belongs to the Paman language group though its specific genetic affiliation has not been established beyond question. Barry Alpher regards it as part of the Pama-Maric group. It shows considerable lexical exchange with Yir-Yiront and Kugu Nganhcara. Many of the 300 native speakers are multilingual, with competence, not only in the above two languages, but also in Pakanha, Uw Olkola and Wik Mungkan. It has the rare feature among Australian aboriginal languages of having numerous monosyllables in all word classes and in possessing, compared to these languages, a comparatively rich inventory of five vowels.

== Country ==
The Thaayorre's tribal lands covered around 1,200 square miles (3,100 km^{2}) from the mouth of the Coleman River, northwards over the Edward River. Their tribal neighbours were the Yir-Yiront to the south, and the Kugu Nganhcara to their north.

== Time and space ==
Normatively, the representation of time in all world cultures has been thought to be organized in relative spatial terms, with one's body as cardinal pivot for the direction of time's flow: from right to left/back to front, or vice versa in each case. According to Alice Gaby, the speakers of Thaayorre have a distinctive system, inscribed in the grammar of their language, whereby the cardinal points are a spatial absolute, determining time as shifting in an east-to-west orientation. Thus, if the speaker stands facing south, time is expressed as flowing from left to right, and, conversely, if one is looking north, time flows from right to left. If the speaker is facing east, time flows towards the body. If west, then time is envisaged as moving away from the subject.

== History ==
The Thaayorre were drawn from their lands in the south-east to the Edward River Mission, which was on their territory, by the ready availability of things like tobacco, sugar, and particularly steel axes. They assigned these things as possessions of the "ghost-clan", meaning that they originated with white people. The Thaayorre now divide their time between Pormpuraaw and outstations in their homeland where they can live a more traditional lifestyle.

== Alternative names ==
- Taiol (Gilbert River pronunciation)
- Tayore
- Koko-Taiyor
- Da:jor
- Koko-Daiyuri
- Kokkotaijari
- Kokotaiyari
- Koko-yak
- Gugujak
- Daiyuri

== Sources ==
- Alpher, Barry (1991). Yir-Yoront Lexicon: Sketch and Dictionary of an Australian Language. Walter de Gruyter. doi:10.1515/9783110872651. ISBN 978-3-110-87265-1.
- Boroditsky, Lera; Gaby, Alice (2010). "Remembrances of Times East: Absolute Spatial Representations of Time in an Australian Aboriginal Community". Psychological Science. 21 (11): 1635–1639. doi:10.1177/0956797610386621. JSTOR 41062425. PMID 20959511. S2CID 22097776.
- Gaby, Alice (2005). "Some participants are More Equal than Others and the Composition of Arguments in Kuuk Thaayorre Competition and Variation in Natural Languages: The Case for Case". In Amberber, Mengistu; de Hoop, Helen (eds.). Perspectives on Cognitive Science. Elsevier. pp. 9–39. ISBN 978-0-080-45977-6.
- Gaby, Alice (2011). "Reciprocal-marked and marked reciprocal events in Kuuk Thaayorre". In Evans, Nicholas; Gaby, Alice; Levinson, Stephen C; Majid, Asifa (eds.). Reciprocals and Semantic Typology. John Benjamins Publishing. pp. 251–264. ISBN 978-9-027-20679-4.
- Gaby, Alice (2012). "The Thaayorre think of Time Like They Talk of Space". Frontiers in Psychology. 3: 300. doi:10.3389/fpsyg.2012.00300. PMC 3428806. PMID 22973243.
- Gaby, Alice (2016). "Hyponymy and the structure of Kuuk Thaayorre kinship". In Verstraete, Jean-Christophe; Hafner, Diane (eds.). Land and Language in Cape York Peninsula and the Gulf Country. John Benjamins Publishing. pp. 159–178. ISBN 978-9-027-26760-3.
- Gaby, Alice Rose (2017). A Grammar of Kuuk Thaayorre. Walter de Gruyter. ISBN 978-3-110-45601-1.
- Tindale, Norman Barnett (1974). "Taior (QLD)". Aboriginal Tribes of Australia: Their Terrain, Environmental Controls, Distribution, Limits, and Proper Names. Australian National University.
