= Ayabakan =

Indigenous Australian people

The Ajabakan were an indigenous Australian people of the Cape York Peninsula of Queensland.

== Country ==
The Ajabakan's lands extended over 1,400 square miles (3,600 km^{2}) around the Upper Edward River. Ursula McConnel in the late twenties identified members of the Ajabakan, together with the Wikianji living westwards of the Aiyaboto who were living south of Coen.

== Language ==
The Ajabakan spoke Bakanha/Ayabakan(u), classified by Robert M. W. Dixon as one of the languages of the Wik subgroup of the Northern Cape York Peninsula A list of words has been compiled by Philip Hamilton as part of a comparative Uw Oykangand and Uw Olkola online dictionary project.

== Social organization ==
Ajabakan culture was sufficiently similar to that of the Munkan to lead McConnel to suspect that they had only detached themselves from the latter in recent times in order to form a distinct tribal grouping, and one which then formed close associations with the Ayapathu. Their social groups were divided into two moieties kuyen (u) and katpen (u), virtually interchangeable with those of the Wikianji. (Note: The Wikianji also use these names kuyan and kàtpi, in contact with their southern neighbours, which are interchangeable with the Bakanu moieties kuyab and kàtpin, and the Aiyaboto moieties, huya and karpai. Patrilineal named moieties do not exist to my knowledge in any of the coastal tribes north of the Edward River.Inland, they extend as far north only as, and end with, the Kandyu, being inconsistent with the social organization of tribes north of the Watson River, which recognize three patrilineal descent lines.) According to Lauriston Sharp, the Ajabakan ic system belonged to what he called the Group V Yir Yoront typology, with clans having a single totem, exclusively under its control in terms of choice of ceremonial site, and strong phratric groupings of clans, bound to the totems of their constituent clans. Clan descent was patrilineal, with; the spirit babies (bukwa nepi) usually located on the land belonging to the father's clan. The Ajabakan, together with the southern Ayapathu and Koko olkolo, . would come from their respectives heartlands on the upper Edward, upper Holroyd, and Coleman Rivers to meet up with the Kaantju on ceremonial occasion on the Ebagoolah cattle-run. These Kaantju had an important wedge role as a territorial mediator between Gulf watershed and east coast tribes.

== Alternative names ==
- Aiabakan
- Bakanu
- Baganu.
- Pakanh (Note: 'McConnel's Bakanu corresponds to Sharp's Aiabakan and my (Ay)-Pakanh.')
- Yirrq-mayn (Bakanh)

== Sources ==
- Alpher, Barry (1991). Yir-Yoront Lexicon: Sketch and Dictionary of an Australian Language. Walter de Gruyter. ISBN 978-3-110-87265-1.
- Dixon, Robert M. W. (2002). Australian Languages: Their Nature and Development. Vol. 1. Cambridge University Press. ISBN 978-0-521-47378-1.
- Hamilton, Philip (1998). "Pakanh". Uw Oykangand and Uw Olkola Multimedia Dictionary. Kowanyama Aboriginal Community Council.
- McConnel, Ursula H. (September 1939). "Social Organization of the Tribes of Cape York Peninsula, North Queensland". Oceania. 10 (1): 54–72. doi:10.1002/j.1834-4461.1939.tb00256.x. JSTOR 40327744.
- Sharp, R. Lauriston (March 1939). "Tribes and Totemism in North-East Australia". Oceania. 9 (3): 254–275. doi:10.1002/j.1834-4461.1939.tb00232.x. JSTOR 40327744.
- Smith, Benjamin Richard (2000). "The Ayapathu People of Cape York Peninsula: a case of tribal resurgence?". Aboriginal History. 24. Australian National University Press: 224–252. JSTOR 24046369.
- von Sturmer, John Richard (1978). The Wik Region: Economy, Territoriality and Totemism in Western Cape York Penminsula, North Queensland (PDF) (Doctoral thesis). University of Queensland.
- Tindale, Norman Barnett (1974). "Ajabakan (QLD)". Aboriginal Tribes of Australia: Their Terrain, Environmental Controls, Distribution, Limits, and Proper Names. Australian National University Press. ISBN 978-0-708-10741-6.
