= Takalak =

Takalak may refer to:

- Takalak people, an ethnic group of Australia
- Takalak language, an Australian language
- Oktay Takalak, French boxer

== See also ==
- Tagalag (disambiguation)
- Tagalak Island
