= Uw Oykangand =

Aboriginal Australian people of Northern Queensland

Regions with significant populations
- Australia

Languages
- Uw Oykangand, English

Related ethnic groups
- Yir-Yoront, Yirrk-Thangalkl, Koko Bera, Thaayorre, Olkola

The Uw Oykangand, otherwise known as the Kwantari, are an Aboriginal Australian people living on the southwestern part of the Cape York Peninsula, in the state of Queensland in Australia. Their neighbours to the northwest are the Yir-Yoront people. Their traditional lands are around the Alice River and the Crosbie River, and further west around the Mitchell River and into Gulf Country.

== Language ==
The Uw Oykangand language is, together with its close dialect relative Uw Olkola, a member of the Kunjen branch of the Pama-Nyungan language family. It has a notable characteristic of maintaining a thorough distinction between the standard content forms of the language and those used in contexts where respect is demanded, such as speaking to those who have kinship relations with one's mother-in-law. The register of respect changes nouns and verbs, for example, while leaving unaltered words that have a purely grammatical function. Bruce Sommer has argued that this together with other Kunjen languages is an exception to the principle advanced by Roman Jakobson and Morris Halle in 1956 according to which consonant +vowel is a universal syllable pattern.

The name of the language Uw Oykangand means "language of the people from the lagoons".

== Country ==
In Norman Tindale's estimation of Uw Oykangand (Kwantari) lands, they are assigned a territorial expanse of roughly 2,400 square miles (6,200 km^{2}), around Galbraith Station and the northern bank of the lower Staaten River. he marked their inland extension as ending at Old Koolatah, and, in the north, at Inkerman and the middle Nassau River.

The Alice-Palmer-Mitchell river system was situated in wide savannah plains, tropical forest and rich wetlands providing a rich diversity of food and before European settlement was one of the most densely populated areas of the Australian continent.

== Mythology ==
In the dreamtime narrative, the pathways the ancestral beings wriggled over as they moved across the landscape met at the junction of the Mitchell and Alice rivers. The Kunjen hold that the watercourses themselves were fashioned in this way by 'rainbows' or snake beings: thus the Inh-Elar (night pigeon) followed in the wake of the Ewarr (Rainbow) as it ploughed through tree roots, so that water bubbled forth until the Rainbow rested and opened its dillybag, releasing flying foxes, whose existence was thereby established.

Water is often a key element in Aboriginal birth narratives, and the Uw Oykangand, like other Kunjen, associate points in water courses as generative sources where the spirit child quickens into life the foetus. Each member of the community has a point in the waterscape that indicates their "home", the point where a water spirit enlivened them, and the place is called a errk elampungk (home place of your image) where the placenta is buried.

== History ==
As one of the Kunjen peoples, the Uw Oykangand suffered deeply from the sudden incursion of whites when the discovery of gold in their region caused the Palmer River Gold Rush in 1873. Cattle stations and pastoralists soon followed to cater for the golddiggers, and, as the indigenous peoples fought to retain a foothold on their tribal lands and resources, they were massacred and pushed westward. Missions were established, such as the one at Kowanyama in 1903, and there a remnant population of a thousand tribal people, mainly Kunjen, Kokobera and Yir Yiront congregated.

Gradually negotiations have been made to reestablish hunting and camping rights within their traditional territories, some of which have been turned into national parks, where hunting is outlawed. One elder challenged a ranger who explained the ban on hunting by reminding him that a hundred years ago whites shot aborigines like dogs, and now aborigines are not allowed to kill wallabies.

== Alternative names ==
- Kuantari, Kundara, Gundara, Goondarra
- Wangara, Wanggara
- Kokowanggara, Kokawangar
- Kokatabul
- Kokodaue, Koko-daua
- Oikand
- Oykangand, Oykayand
- Uw
- Oykangant

== Sources ==
- "AIATSIS map of Indigenous Australia". AIATSIS. 14 May 2024.
- Alpher, Barry (1993). "Out-of-the-ordinary Ways of using a language". In Walsh, Michael; Yallop, Colin (eds.). Language and Culture in Aboriginal Australia. Aboriginal Studies Press. pp. 97–106. ISBN 978-0-855-75241-5. Can Threatened Languages be Saved?.
- Crump, Des (10 August 2020). "Language of the Week: Week Eleven - Oykangand". State Library of Queensland.
- Oldham, Carolyn; Crebbin, Gregory; Dobbs, Stephen; Gaynor, Andrea (2013). Engineers Engaging Community: Water and Energy. Morgan & Claypool Publishers. ISBN 978-1-608-45964-3.
- "Oykangand". AustKin.
- Sommer, Bruce A (1981). "The Shape of Kunjen syllables". In Goyvaerts, Didier L. (ed.). Phonology in the 1980s. John Benjamins Publishing. pp. 231–244. ISBN 978-9-027-27085-6.
- Sommer, Bruce A. (2006). Speaking Kunjen: An Ethnography of Oykangand Kinship and Communication. Research School of Pacific and Asian Studies. ISBN 978-0-858-83557-3.
- Strang, Veronica (2013). Gardening The World: Agency, Identity and the Ownership of Water. Berghahn Books. ISBN 978-1-782-38131-0.
- Tindale, Norman Barnett (1974). "Kwantari (QLD)". Aboriginal Tribes of Australia: Their Terrain, Environmental Controls, Distribution, Limits, and Proper Names. Australian National University. Archived from the original on 11 March 2015.
