= Tagalag =

Tagalag may refer to:

- Tagalag people, an ethnic group of Australia
- Tagalag language, an Australian language
- Tagalag, Valenzuela, a barangay in the city of Valenzuela, Philippines

== See also ==
- Tagalog (disambiguation)
- Tagalak Island
