= Classifier (linguistics) =

Type of word or affix that is used to accompany nouns

A classifier (abbreviated clf or cl) is a word or affix that accompanies nouns and can be considered to "classify" a noun depending on some characteristics (e.g. humanness, animacy, sex, shape, social status) of its referent. Classifiers in this sense are specifically called noun classifiers because some languages in Papua as well as the Americas have verbal classifiers which categorize the referent of its argument.

In languages that have classifiers, they are often used when the noun is being counted, that is, when it appears with a numeral. In such languages, a phrase such as "three people" is often required to be expressed as "three X (of) people", where X is a classifier appropriate to the noun for "people"; compare to "three blades of grass". Classifiers that appear next to a numeral or a quantifier are particularly called numeral classifiers. They play an important role in certain languages, especially East and Southeast Asian languages, including Chinese, Korean, Japanese, and Vietnamese.

Numeral classifiers may have other functions too; in Chinese, they are commonly used when a noun is preceded by a demonstrative (word meaning "this" or "that"). Some Asian languages like Zhuang, Hmong and Cantonese use "bare classifier construction" where a classifier is attached without numerals to a noun for definite reference; the latter two languages also extend numeral classifiers to the possessive classifier construction where they behave as a possessive marker connecting a noun to another noun that denotes the possessor.

Possessive classifiers are usually used in accord with semantic characteristics of the possessed noun and less commonly with the relation between the possessed and the possessor although possessor classifiers are reported in a few languages (e.g. Dâw).

Classifiers are absent or marginal in European languages. An example of a possible classifier in English is piece in phrases like "three pieces of paper". In American Sign Language, particular classifier handshapes represent a noun's orientation in space.

There are similarities between classifier systems and noun classes, although there are also significant differences. While noun classes are defined in terms of agreement, classifiers do not alter the form of other elements in a clause. Also, languages with classifiers may have hundreds of classifiers whereas languages with noun classes (or in particular, genders) tend to have a smaller number of classifiers. Noun classes are not always dependent on the nouns' meaning but they have a variety of grammatical consequences.

== Overview ==
A classifier is a word (or in some analyses, a bound morpheme) which accompanies a noun in certain grammatical contexts, and generally reflects some kind of conceptual classification of nouns, based principally on features of their referents. Thus a language might have one classifier for nouns representing persons, another for nouns representing flat objects, another for nouns denoting periods of time, and so on. The assignment of classifier to noun may also be to some degree unpredictable, with certain nouns taking certain classifiers by historically established convention.

The situations in which classifiers may or must appear depend on the grammar of the language in question, but they are frequently required when a noun is accompanied by a numeral. They are therefore sometimes known (particularly in the context of languages such as Japanese) as counter words. They may also be used when a noun is accompanied by a demonstrative (a word such as "this" or "that").

The following examples, from Standard Mandarin Chinese, illustrate the use of classifiers with a numeral. The classifiers used here are 位 (pinyin wèi), used (among other things) with nouns for humans; 棵 kē, used with nouns for trees; 只/隻 (zhī), used with nouns for certain animals, including birds; and 条/條 (tiáo), used with nouns for certain long flexible objects. (Plurals of Chinese nouns are not normally marked in any way; the same form of the noun is used for both singular and plural.)

三 位 学生
sān wèi xuéshēng
three CL[human] student
"three students"

三 棵 树
sān kē shù
three CL[tree] tree
"three trees"

三 只 鸟
sān zhī niǎo
three CL[animal] bird
"three birds"

三 条 河
sān tiáo hé
three CL[long-wavy] river
"three rivers"

个 (個) gè, is also often used in informal speech as a general classifier, with almost any noun, taking the place of more specific classifiers.

The noun in such phrases may be omitted, if the classifier alone (and the context) is sufficient to indicate what noun is intended. For example, in answering a question:

多少 条 河
duōshǎo tiáo hé
{how many} CL river
"How many rivers?"

三 条
sān tiáo
three CL
"Three."

Languages which make systematic use of (noun) classifiers include Chinese, Japanese, Korean, Southeast Asian languages, Bengali, Assamese, Persian, Austronesian languages, Mayan languages and others. A less typical example of classifiers is those used with the verb. Verbal classifiers are found in languages like Southern Athabaskan.

Classifier handshapes are also found in sign languages, although these have a somewhat different grammatical function.

Classifiers are often derived from nouns (or occasionally other parts of speech), which have become specialized as classifiers, or may retain other uses besides their use as classifiers. Classifiers, like other words, are sometimes borrowed from other languages. A language may be said to have dozens or even hundreds of different classifiers. However, such enumerations often also include measure words.

=== Classifiers versus measure words ===
Measure words play a similar role to classifiers, except that they denote a particular quantity of something (a drop, a cupful, a pint, etc.), rather than the inherent countable units associated with a count noun. Classifiers are used with count nouns; measure words can be used with mass nouns (e.g. "two pints of mud"), and can also be used when a count noun's quantity is not described in terms of its inherent countable units (e.g. "two pints of acorns").

However, the terminological distinction between classifiers and measure words is often blurred – classifiers are commonly referred to as measure words in some contexts, such as Chinese language teaching, and measure words are sometimes called mass-classifiers or similar.

== Examples by language ==
=== European languages ===
Classifiers are not generally a feature of English or other European languages, although classifier-like constructions are found with certain nouns. A commonly cited English example is the word head in phrases such as "five head of cattle": the word cattle (for some speakers) is an uncountable (mass) noun, and requires the word head to enable its units to be counted. The parallel construction exists in French: une tête de bétail ("one head of cattle"), in Spanish: una cabeza de ganado ("one head of cattle") and in Italian: un capo di bestiame ("one head of cattle"). Note the difference between "five head of cattle" (meaning five animals), and "five heads of cattle" (identical to "five cattle's heads", meaning specifically their heads). A similar phrase used by florists is "ten stem of roses" (meaning roses on their stems).

European languages naturally use measure words. These are required for counting in the case of mass nouns, and some can also be used with count nouns. For example, one can have a glass of beer, and a handful of coins. The English construction with of is paralleled in many languages, although in German (and similarly in Dutch and the Scandinavian languages) the two words are simply juxtaposed, e.g. one says ein Glas Bier (literally "a glass beer", with no word for "of"). Slavic languages put the second noun in the genitive case (e.g. Russian чаша пива (chasha piva), literally "a beer's glass"), but Bulgarian, having lost the Slavic case system, uses expressions identical to German (e.g. чаша пиво).

Certain nouns are associated with particular measure words or other classifier-like words that enable them to be counted. For example, paper is often counted in sheets as in "five sheets of paper". Usage or non-usage of measure words may yield different meanings, e.g. five papers is grammatically equally correct but refers to newspapers or academic papers. Some inherently plural nouns require the word pair(s) (or its equivalent) to enable reference to a single object or specified number of objects, as in "a pair of scissors", "three pairs of pants", or the French une paire de lunettes ("a pair of (eye)glasses").

=== Australian Aboriginal Languages ===
Australian Aboriginal languages are known for often having extensive noun class systems based on semantic criteria. In many cases, a given noun can be identified as a member of a given class via an adjacent classifier, which can either form a hyponym construction with a specific noun, or act as a generic noun on its own.

==== Kuuk Thaayorre ====
In the following example from Kuuk Thaayorre, the specific borrowed noun tin.meat 'tinned meat' is preceded by its generic classifier minh 'meat.'

minh tin.meat mungka-rr
CL(meat) tinned-meat(ACC) eat-PST.PFV
'[they] ate tinned meat'

In the next example, the same classifier minh stands in on its own for a generic crocodile (punc), another member of the minh class:

yokun minh-al patha-rr pulnan
perhaps CL(meat)-ERG bite-PST.PFV 3DU.ACC
'perhaps a [crocodile] got them'

Classifiers and specific nouns in Kuuk Thaayorre can also co-occupy the head of a noun phrase to form something like a compound or complex noun as in ngat minh.patp 'CL(fish) hawk' which is the complex noun meaning 'stingray'.

Classifier	Noun Class
minh	edible land animals: meat, land animals that one eats, all birds, inedible aquatic animals (e.g. crocodiles).
ngat	edible aquatic animals
may	edible plants: non-meat food, a meal, honey, honey bees
ngok	liquids
kuuk	structured utterances: speech, languages, birdsong
warrath	grasses
yuk1	trees: tree species and tree parts
yuk2	elongated objects: cigarettes, aeroplanes, cyclones, microphones
raak1	locations: place names, geographical areas, ground, the earth, soil.
raak2	times: diurnal phases, seasons, etc.
raak3	items of material culture: money
pam1	people: humans generically
pam2	men: adult male humans
paanth	women: adult female humans
parr_r	youth: immature humans and other species
kuta	social animals: cats, dingoes
ngan	relatives
ruurr	insects

==== Diyari ====
Another example of this kind of hyponym construction can be seen in Diyari:

ngathi nhinha pirta pathara dandra-rda purri-yi
1SG.ERG 3.SG.NFEM.ACC CL(tree) box.tree.ACC hit-PCP AUX-PRS
'I chop the box tree'

See the nine Diyari classifiers below

Classifier	Noun Class
karna	human beings, excluding non-Aboriginal people
paya	birds which fly
thutyu	reptiles and insects
nganthi	other edible animates
puka	edible vegetable food
pirta	trees and wood
marda	stone and minerals (including introduced metallic entities)
thurru	fire
ngapa	water

==== Ngalakgan ====
Contrast the above with Ngalakgan in which classifiers are prefixes on the various phrasal heads of the entire noun phrase (including modifiers):

mungu-yimiliʔ mu-ŋolko gu-mu-rabona
CL(season)-wet.season CL(season)3-big 3sg-CL(season).3-go.FUT
'A big wet season will be coming on'

Ngalakgan has fewer noun classes than many Australian Languages, the complete set of its class prefixes are below:

CL Prefix	Noun Class
rnu(gu)-	male humans and higher animals; most other animals; etc.
dju(gu)-	female humans and higher animals
mu(ngu)-	most edible (and some inedible) plants; some implements; seasons; etc.
gu(ngu)-	most body parts; most implements; many plants, topographical terms; etc.

=== Bengali, Assamese, Maithili and Nepali ===
Atypically for an Indo-European language, Bengali makes use of classifiers. Every noun in this language must have its corresponding classifier when used with a numeral or other quantifier. Most nouns take the generic classifier ṭa (variation: ṭi, ṭe, ṭuk, ṭuku), although there are many more specific measure words, such as jon, which is only used to count humans. Still, there are many fewer measure words in Bengali than in Chinese or Japanese. As in Chinese, Bengali nouns are not inflected for number.

Bengali examples

Nôe-ṭi ghoṛi
Nine-CL clock
Nine clocks

Kôe-ṭa balish
how.many-CL pillow
How many pillows

Kôto-ṭuku bhat
how.much-CL rice
How much rice

Ônek-jon lok
many-CL person
Many people

Char-pañch-jon shikkhôk
four-five-CL teacher
Four to five teachers

Similar to the situation in Chinese, measuring nouns in Bengali without their corresponding measure words (e.g. aṭ biṛal instead of aṭ-ṭa biṛal "eight cats") would typically be considered ungrammatical. However, it is common to omit the classifier when it counts a noun that is not in the nominative case (e.g., aṭ biṛaler desh (eight cats-possessive country ), or panc bhUte khelo (five ghosts-instrumental ate)) or when the number is very large (e.g., ek sho lok esechhe ("One hundred people have come.")). Classifiers may also be dropped when the focus of the sentence is not on the actual counting but on a statement of fact (e.g., amar char chhele (I-possessive four boy, I have four sons)). Omitting the noun and preserving the classifier is grammatical and common. For example, Shudhu êk-jon thakbe. (lit. "Only one-MW will remain.") would be understood to mean "Only one person will remain.", since jon can only be used to count humans. The word lok "person" is implied.

In Bengali grammar, classifiers are generally considered a subgroup of articles. The -ṭa suffix comes from /goṭa/ 'piece', and is also used as a definite article. However, indefinite article suffixes can also be used as a classifier. Only such suffix in Bengali is ek (lit. 'one'), which typically indicates an small but indefinite quantity or number. For example, Miniṭ dôshek lagbe (lit. 'Minutes ten-CL needed', "around ten minutes required").

Maithili, Nepali and Assamese have systems very similar to Bengali's. Maithili uses -ta for objects and -goatey for humans; similarly, Nepali has -waṭā (-वटा) for objects and -janā (-जना) for humans.

Assamese, Chittagonian, Sylheti and other Bengali-Assamese languages have more classifiers than Bengali. The presence of classifiers in Northeast India may be linked to contact with the Tibeto-Burman and Austroasiatic languages spoken in the region.

Assamese

আমটো
Am-tú
{mango-CL[inanimate objects]}
The mango

দুটা শব্দ
Du-ta xobdo
{two-CL[counting numerals]} word
Two words

কেইটা বালিছ
Kei-ta balis
how.many-CL pillow
How many pillows

বালিছকেইটা
Balis-kei-ta
pillow-many-CL
The pillows

চাৰি-পাঁচজন মানুহ
Sari-pas-zon manuh
{four-five-CL[male humans (polite)]} human
Four or five men

মেকুৰীজনী
Mekuri-zoni
{cat-CL[females of human and animals]}
The female cat

এখন ঘৰ
E-khon ghor
{one-CL[flat small; and big items]} house
A house

কিতাপকেইখন
Kitap-kei-khon
book-many-CL
The books

পানীখিনি
Pani-khini
{water-CL[uncountable and uncounted items]}
The water

সাপডাল
Xap-dal
{snake-CL[long and thin items]}
The snake

Persian has a scheme very similar to the Indo-Aryan languages Bengali, Assamese, Maithili and Nepali.

=== Persian ===
Although not always used in written language, Persian uses classifiers regularly in spoken word. Persian has two general-use classifiers, دانه (dāne) and تا (tā), the former of which is used with singular nouns, while the latter is used with plural nouns.

Yek dāne pesar
One {CL:SG.general use} boy
One boy

Do tā pesar
Two {CL:PL.general use} boy
Two boys

čand tā pesar?
{How many} {CL:PL.general use} boy?
How many boys?

In addition to general-use classifiers, Persian also has several specific classifiers, including the following:

Do bāb forušgāh
Two CL:buildings store
Two stores

Yek qors nān
One CL:bread bread
A loaf of bread

Se kalāf sim
Three {CL:wire, yarn, thread} wire
Three reels of wire

=== Burmese ===
In Burmese, classifiers, in the form of particles, are used when counting or measuring nouns. They immediately follow the numerical quantification. Nouns to which classifiers refer can be omitted if the context allows, because many classifiers have implicit meanings.

သူ တူ နှစ် ချောင်း ရှိ တယ်
θù tù n̥ə t͡ʃʰáʊɴ ʃḭ dè
Thu tu hna chaung shi de
he chopstick two {CL:long and thin items} have PRES
He has two chopsticks.

စားပွဲ ခုနစ် လုံး ရှိ လား
zəbwé {kʰwɛʔ n̥ə} lóʊɴ ʃḭ là
Zabwe khun-hna lon shi la
table seven {CL:round, globular things} have Q
Do you have seven tables?

လူ တစ် ဦး
lù tə ú
lu ta u
one CL:people person
one person or a person

=== Thai ===
Thai employs classifiers in the widest range of NP constructions compared to similar classifier languages from the area. Classifiers are obligatory for nouns followed by numerals in Thai. Nouns in Thai are counted by a specific classifier, which are usually grammaticalized nouns. An example of a grammaticalized noun functioning as a classifier is คน (khon). Khon is used for people (except monks and royalty) and literally translates to 'person'. The general form for numerated nouns in Thai is noun-numeral-classifier. Similar to Mandarin Chinese, classifiers in Thai are also used when the noun is accompanied by a demonstrative. However, this is not obligatory in the case of demonstratives. Demonstratives also require a different word order than for numerals. The general scheme for demonstratives is noun-classifier-demonstrative. In some instances, classifiers are also used to denote singularity. Thai nouns are bare nominals and are ambiguous regarding number. In order to differentiate between the expression "this child" vs. "these children", a classifier is added to the noun followed by a demonstrative. This 'singularity effect' is apparent in เด็กคนนี้ (child-classifier-this) referring exclusively to one child as opposed to เด็กนี้ (child this), which is vague in terms of number.

Combining nouns with adjectives could be simply done without the use of classifiers such as รถเก่า (rot kao, old car), it is sometimes necessary to add a classifier in order to distinguish the specific object from a group e.g. รถคันเก่า (rot khan kao, the old car). Some quantifiers require classifiers in Thai. It has been claimed that quantifiers which do not require classifiers are adjuncts and those which do are part of the functional structure of the noun phrase. Quantifiers which require a classifier include ทุก (thuk, every) บาง (bang, some). This is also the case of approximations e.g. หมาบางตัว (ma bang tua, some dogs). Negative quantification is simply expressed by adding ไม่มี (mai mi, there are not) in front of the noun.

Example	Usage
เพื่อน สอง คน phuen song khon friends two CL:people; Two friends	Cardinal numbers
นก ตัว หนึ่ง nok tua nung bird CL:animals one a bird or one bird	Indefiniteness
ทุเรียน หลาย ลูก turian lai luk durian many {CL:fruits or balls} Many durians	Measure/quantity
รถ คัน นี้ rot khan ni car {CL:land vehicles} this This car	Demonstratives
บ้าน ทุก หลัง ban tuk lang house every CL:houses; Every house	Quantifiers
นักเรียน คน ที่ สอง nakrian khon thi song student CL:people {ordinal particle} two The second student	Ordinals
หนังสือ เล่ม ใหม่ nungsue lem mai book {CL:books and knives} new The new book	Adjectives

Complex nominal phrases can yield expressions containing several classifiers. This phenomenon is rather unique to Thai, compared to other classifier languages from the region.

Thai

เรือ ลำ ใหญ่ ลำ นั้น
ruea lam yai lam nan
boat {CL:boats and planes} large {CL:boats and planes} that
that large boat

เรือ ลำ ใหญ่ สาม ลำ
ruea lam yai sam lam
boat {CL:boats and planes} large three {CL:boats and planes}
three large boats

เรือ ลำ ใหญ่ สาม ลำ นั้น
ruea lam yai sam lam nan
boat {CL:boats and planes} large three {CL:boats and planes} that
those three large boats

=== Chinese ===
Although classifiers were not often used in Classical Chinese, in all modern Chinese varieties such as Mandarin, nouns are normally required to be accompanied by a classifier or measure word when they are qualified by a numeral or by a demonstrative. Examples with numerals have been given above in the Overview section. An example with a demonstrative is the phrase for "this person" — 这个人 zhè ge rén. The character 个 is a classifier, literally meaning "individual" or "single entity", so the entire phrase translates literally as "this individual person" or "this single person". A similar example is the phrase for "these people" — 这群人 zhè qún rén, where the classifier 群 means "group" or "herd", so the phrase literally means "this group [of] people" or "this crowd".

The noun in a classifier phrase may be omitted, if the context and choice of classifier make the intended noun obvious. An example of this again appears in the Overview section above.

The choice of a classifier for each noun is somewhat arbitrary and must be memorized by learners of Chinese, but often relates to the object's physical characteristics. For example, the character 条 tiáo originally means "twig" or "thin branch", is now used most often as a classifier for thin, elongated things such as rope, snake and fish, and can be translated as "(a) length (of)", "strip" or "line".

Not all classifiers derive from nouns, however. For example, the character 張/张 zhāng is originally a verb meaning "to span (a bow)", and is now used as a classifier to denote squarish flat objects such as paper, hide, or (the surface of) table, and can be more or less translated as "sheet". The character 把 bǎ was originally a verb meaning to grasp/grip, but is now more commonly used as the noun for "handle", and as the classifier for "handful".

Technically a distinction is made between classifiers (or count-classifiers), which are used only with count nouns and do not generally carry any meaning of their own, and measure words (or mass-classifiers), which can be used also with mass nouns and specify a particular quantity (such as "bottle" [of water] or "pound" [of fruit]). Less formally, however, the term "measure word" is used interchangeably with "classifier".

=== Gilbertese ===
In Gilbertese, classifiers must be used as a suffix when counting. The appropriate classifier is chosen based on the kind and shape of the noun, and combines with the numeral, sometimes adopting several different forms.

There is a general classifier (-ua) which exists in simple numbers (te-ua-na 1; uo-ua 2; ten-ua 3; a-ua 4; nima-ua 5; until 9) and is used when there is no specific classifier and for counting periods of time and years; and specific classifiers like:

- -man (for people, animals, small fishes; te man alone means bird (man-ni-kiba, flying animal) or small bug);
- -ai (for big fishes and cetaceans);
- -waa (for canoes and, by extension, all vehicles (a-waa te waanikiba means "4 planes" - waa-ni-kiba, literal meaning is "flying canoe");

=== Japanese ===
In Japanese grammar, classifiers must be used with a number when counting nouns. The appropriate classifier is chosen based on the kind and shape of the noun, and combines with the numeral, sometimes adopting several different forms.

鉛筆 五本
enpitsu go-hon
pencil {five-CL[cylindrical objects]}
five pencils

犬 三匹
inu san-biki
dog {three-CL[small animals]}
three dogs

子供 四人
kodomo yo-nin
child four-CL[people]
four children

鶏 三羽
niwatori san-ba
chicken three-CL[birds]
three chickens

ヨット 三艘
yotto san-sō
yacht {three-CL[small boats]}
three yachts

車 一台
kuruma ichi-dai
car {one-CL[mechanical objects]}
one car

トランプ 二枚
toranpu ni-mai
playing.card {two-CL[flat objects]}
two cards

=== Korean ===
The Korean language has classifiers in the form of suffixes which attach to numerals. For example, jang (장) is used to count sheets of paper, blankets, leaves, and other similar objects: "ten bus tickets" could be translated beoseu pyo yeol-jang (버스 표 열 장), literally "bus ticket ten-[classifier]".

종이 세 장
jong'i se jang
paper three {CL[flat objects]}
three sheets of paper

자전거 다섯 대
jajeongeo daseot dae
bicycle five CL[vehicles]
five bicycles

어른 네 명
eoreun ne myeong
adult four CL[people]
four adults

물건 여섯 개
mulgeon yeoseot gae
thing six {CL[common things]}
six things

토끼 한 마리
tokki han mari
rabbit one CL[animals]
one rabbit

책 두 권
chaek du gwon
book two CL[books]
two books

고기 일곱 점
gogi ilgop jeom
meat seven {CL[pieces of meat]}
seven pieces of meat

옷 여덟 벌
ot yeodeol beol
cloth eight CL[clothes]
eight clothes

=== Malay/Indonesian ===
In Malay grammar, classifiers are used to count all nouns, including concrete nouns, abstract nouns and phrasal nouns. Nouns are not reduplicated for plural form when used with classifiers, definite or indefinite, although Mary Dalrymple and Suriel Mofu give counterexamples where reduplication and classifiers co-occur. In informal language, classifiers can be used with numbers alone without the nouns if the context is well known. The Malay term for classifiers is penjodoh bilangan, while the term in Indonesian is kata penggolong.

Seekor kerbau
One-CL:animals water-buffalo.
A water-buffalo.

Dua orang pelajar itu
Two CL:people students that.
Those two students.

Berapa buah kereta yang dijual? / Tiga buah.
{How many} CL:general cars {relative word} sold? / Three CL:general
How many cars are sold? / Three of them.

Secawan kopi.
One-cup coffee
A cup of coffee.

Saya mendengar empat das {tembakan pistol}.
I heard four CL:gunshots gunshots.
I heard four gunshots.

Saya minta sebatang rokok.
I {would like} {one-CL:cylindrical objects} cigarette.
I would like a cigarette.

Tiga biji pasir.
Three {CL:small grains} sand.
Three grains of sand.

=== Vietnamese ===
Vietnamese uses a similar set of classifiers to Chinese, Japanese and Korean.

ba bộ áo dài
three {[inanimate object counter]} upper garment+long
three (sets of) áo dài

=== Khmer ===
Khmer (Cambodian) also uses classifiers, although they can quite frequently be omitted. Since it is a head-first language, the classifier phrase (number plus classifier) comes after the noun.

=== Santali ===
Santali uses several sets of classifiers. They can be divided into three classes: tɛn (variant tɛc, taŋ) for 'one' and non-human beings; ea with numerals 'two', 'four' and 'twenty'; gɔtɛn (variant gɔtɜc) with numerals from 'five' to 'ten' and with the distributive numerals.

uni mit' taŋ Kali-boɳga benao-akad-e-a-e
3SG.M one CLF Kali-idol make-ACT.PRF-3SG.OBJ-FIN-3SG.SUBJ
"He has made a Kali idol."

=== Mundari ===
In Mundari noun phrase, classifier always precedes the noun but comes after number, like Santali, Ho, and Vietnamese. Although not frequently occur, Mundari speakers use hoɽo ('person') to count people, oɽaʔ ('house') to count buildings, and booʔ ('head') to count animals.

api hoɽo hon-ko
three CLF child-PL
three children

=== Ho ===
Similar to Mundari and Santali, Ho nouns and noun phrases require classifiers. The Ho use hoː ('person') as classifier for human, owaʔ ('house') for buildings, and boːʔ ('head') for animals. Note that this classifier requirement has weakened in the Mayurbhanj Ho dialect and Bhumij.

gel boːʔ merom-ko
ten CLF goat-PL
ten goats

=== Other Munda languages ===
In comparison to the three main Munda languages of South Asia, other smaller Munda languages appear not having developed numeral classifiers as a lexical class or had sort of classificatory markers denoting animals and people but have been fossilized. In South Munda Remo, some forms of prefix classifier seem to occur relatively commonly or in quasi-definable semantic groups of words, such as the animal classifier gV- and its realizations gi/u/ə-. E.g. gisiŋ ('chicken'), gusoʔ ('dog'), gəga ('crow'), gise ('grasshopper'). The same element can also be seen very saliently in many Gorum and Sora words. In Sora, a lexical noun or bi-moraic free-standing form usually contains a monosyllabic root or combining form (CF) and a prefix that always attaches to a certain semantic groups of words. This prefix disappears when the noun forms compound words. For examples, kəndud ('frog') vs sənna-dud-ən (small-frog-NMLZ 'small frog'), the animal classifier prefix kVn- is removed from compounds.

=== American Sign Language ===
In American Sign Language classifier constructions are used to express position, stative description (size and shape), and how objects are handled manually. The particular hand shape used to express any of these constructions is what functions as the classifier. Various hand shapes can represent whole entities; show how objects are handled or instruments are used; represent limbs; and be used to express various characteristics of entities such as dimensions, shape, texture, position, and path and manner of motion. While the label of classifiers has been accepted by many sign language linguists, some argue that these constructions do not parallel oral-language classifiers in all respects and prefer to use other terms, such as polymorphemic or polycomponential signs.

Examples:

- 1 hand shape: used for individuals standing or long thin objects
- A hand shape: used for compact objects
- C hand shape: used for cylindrical objects
- 3 hand shape: used for ground vehicles
- ILY hand shape: used for aircraft

== Global distribution ==
Classifiers are part of the grammar of most East Asian languages, including Chinese, Japanese, Korean, Vietnamese, Malay, Burmese, Thai, Hmong, and the Bengali and Munda languages just to the west of the East and Southeast Asia linguistic area. They are present in many Australian Aboriginal languages, including Yidiny and Murrinhpatha. Among indigenous languages of the Americas, classifiers are present in the Pacific Northwest, especially among the Tsimshianic languages, and in many languages of Mesoamerica, including Classic Maya and most of its modern derivatives. They also occur in some languages of the Amazon Basin (most famously Yagua) and a very small number of West African languages.

In contrast, classifiers are entirely absent not only from European languages, but also from many languages of northern Asia (Uralic, Turkic, Mongolic, Tungusic and mainland Paleosiberian languages), and also from the indigenous languages of the southern parts of both North and South America. In Austronesian languages, classifiers are quite common and may have been acquired as a result of contact with Mon–Khmer languages but the most remote members such as Malagasy and Hawaiian have lost them. Furthermore, Javanese—the largest Austronesian language by number of speakers—does not use classifiers either.

The World Atlas of Language Structures has a global map showing 400 languages and chapter text including geographical discussion:

Numeral classifiers exhibit striking worldwide distribution at the global level. The main concentration of numeral classifiers is in a single zone centered in East and Southeast Asia, but reaching out both westwards and eastwards. To the west, numeral classifiers peter out as one proceeds across the South Asian subcontinent; thus, in this particular region, the occurrence of numeral classifiers cross-cuts what has otherwise been characterized as one of the classical examples of a linguistic area, namely, South Asia. However, numeral classifiers pick up again, albeit in optional usage, in parts of western Asia centering on Iran and Turkey; it is not clear whether this should be considered as a continuation of the same large though interrupted isogloss, or as a separate one. To the east, numeral classifiers extend out through the Indonesian archipelago, and then into the Pacific in a grand arc through Micronesia and then down to the southeast, tapering out in New Caledonia and western Polynesia. Interestingly, whereas in the western parts of the Indonesian archipelago numeral classifiers are often optional, in the eastern parts of the archipelago and in Micronesia numeral classifiers tend once more, as in mainland East and Southeast Asia, to be obligatory. Outside this single large zone, numeral classifiers are almost exclusively restricted to a number of smaller hotbeds, in West Africa, the Pacific Northwest, Mesoamerica, and the Amazon basin. In large parts of the world, numeral classifiers are completely absent.

== Noun classifiers versus noun classes ==
The concept of noun classifier is distinct from that of noun class.

- Classifier systems typically involve 20 or more, or even several hundred, classifiers (separate lexemes that co-occur with nouns). Noun class systems (including systems of grammatical gender) typically comprise a closed set of two to twenty classes, into which all nouns in the language are divided.
- Not every noun need take a classifier, and many nouns can occur with different classifiers. In a language with noun classes, each noun typically belongs to one and only one class, which is usually shown by a word form or an accompanying article and functions grammatically. The same referent can be referred to by nouns with different noun classes, such as die Frau "the woman" (feminine) and das Weib "the woman (archaic, pejorative)" (neuter) in German.
- Noun classes are typically marked by inflection, i.e. through bound morphemes which cannot appear alone in a sentence. Class may be marked on the noun itself, but will also often be marked on other constituents in the noun phrase or in the sentence that show agreement with the noun. Noun classifiers are always free lexical items that occur in the same noun phrase as the noun they qualify. They never form a morphological unit with the noun, and there is never agreement marking on the verb.
- The classifier occurs in only some syntactic environments. In addition, use of the classifier may be influenced by the pragmatics of style and the choice of written or spoken mode. Often, the more formal the style, the richer the variety of classifiers used, and the higher the frequency of their use. Noun class markers are mandatory under all circumstances.
- Noun classifiers are usually derived from words used as names of concrete, discrete, moveable objects. Noun class markers are typically affixes without any literal meaning.

Nevertheless, there is no clearly demarked difference between the two: since classifiers often evolve into class systems, they are two extremes of a grammaticalization continuum.

== Conceptual similarity to determinatives (writing systems) ==
The Egyptian hieroglyphic script is formed of a repertoire of hundreds of graphemes which play different semiotic roles. Almost every word ends with an unpronounced grapheme (the so-called "determinative") that carries no additional phonetic value of its own. As such, this hieroglyph is a "mute" icon, which does not exist on the spoken level of language but supplies the word in question, through its iconic meaning alone, with extra semantic information.

In recent years, this system of unpronounced graphemes was compared to classifiers in spoken languages. The results show that the two systems, those of unpronounced graphemic classifiers and those of pronounced classifiers in classifier languages obey similar rules of use and function. The graphemic classifiers of the hieroglyphic script presents an emic image of knowledge organization in the Ancient Egyptian mind.

Similar graphemic classifiers are known also in Hieroglyphic Luwian and in Chinese scripts.

== See also ==
- American Sign Language grammar
- Analytic language
- Determiner (linguistics)
- Noun class
- Southern Athabascan grammar § Classificatory verbs
- Women, Fire, and Dangerous Things
