= Sarah Ogilvie =

Australian linguist, lexicographer, and computer scientist

Sarah Ogilvie is an Australian linguist, lexicographer, and computer scientist.

== Early life ==
Ogilvie grew up in Brisbane, Australia. As a graduate student, she spent a few years living with the Lamalama people, an aboriginal tribe (Note: See Australian Aboriginal kinship) on the tip of Cape York in northern Australia. While there, she wrote a dictionary and grammar of their language, Morrobalama, which had never been written down before.

== Education ==
She completed a BSc in Computer Science and Pure Mathematics at the University of Queensland and an MA in linguistics at the Australian National University. She completed her doctorate in linguistics at the University of Oxford.

== Career ==
She used to teach linguistics at Stanford, Cambridge, and Australian National University. She also worked at Amazon's innovation lab in Silicon Valley. While working at Amazon's Lab126, she was part of the team that developed the Kindle. Ogilvie is also a former editor of the Oxford English Dictionary.

She currently works as a Senior Research Fellow in the Faculty of Linguistics, Philology, and Phonetics and of Campion Hall at the University of Oxford.

== Publications ==
- Concise Encyclopedia of the Languages of the World (Elsevier, 2008)
- "Words of the World". Cambridge University Press & Assessment.
- Keeping Languages Alive: Documentation, Pedagogy, and Revitalization (Cambridge University Press, 2014)
- The Whole World in a Book: Dictionaries in the Nineteenth Century (Oxford University Press, 2020)
- Cambridge Companion to English Dictionaries (Cambridge University Press, 2020)
- Gen Z, Explained: the art of living in a digital age (University of Chicago Press, 2022)
- The Dictionary People: the unsung heroes who created the Oxford English Dictionary (Chatto & Windus (UK), Knopf (USA), 2023)
