= Angkula language =

Australian Aboriginal language

Angkula
- Ogh Angkula
- Native to: Australia
- Region: Cape York Peninsula, Queensland
- Extinct: (date missing)
- Language family: Pama–Nyungan: Paman; Thaypan; Angkula

Language codes
- ISO 639-3: None (mis)
- Glottolog: None
- AIATSIS: Y197

The Angkula language, or Ogh Angkula, is an extinct Paman language of the Cape York Peninsula in Queensland, Australia. It was close to Alungul.
