= Pakanha language =

Australian Aboriginal language

Pakanha
- Ayabakan
- Native to: Australia
- Region: Cape York Peninsula, Queensland
- Ethnicity: Ayabakan
- Extinct: 1990s No known L1 speakers
- Language family: Pama–Nyungan: Paman; North Cape York; Wik; Pakanha
- Dialects: Western Ayapathu

Language codes
- ISO 639-3: pkn
- Glottolog: paka1251
- AIATSIS: Y64 Pakanh, Y181 Western Ayapathu
- ELP: Pakanh
- Coordinates: 14°30′S 142°25′E

Pakanha (Bakanha), or Ayabakan, is a nearly extinct Paman language spoken on the Cape York Peninsula of Queensland, Australia. In 1981, there were 10 speakers of the language, originally spoken by the aboriginal Pakanha people in the central part of the Cape York Peninsula.

== Phonology ==
=== Vowels ===
Pakanha has 5 vowel qualities:

	Short			Long		
	Front	Central	Back	Front	Central	Back
Close	i ⟨i⟩		u ~ ʊ ⟨u⟩	iː ⟨ii⟩		uː ⟨uu⟩
Mid	e ~ e̞ ⟨e⟩		o ~ ɔ ⟨o⟩	ɛː ⟨ee⟩		oː ⟨oo⟩
Open		a ~ ə ⟨a⟩			aː ⟨aa⟩	

=== Consonants ===
Pakanha has 15 consonants:

	Peripheral		Laminal		Apical		Glottal
	Bilabial	Velar	Palatal	Dental	Alveolar	Retroflex	Glottal
Plosive	p ⟨p⟩	k ⟨k⟩	c ⟨ch⟩	t̪ ⟨th⟩	t ⟨t⟩		ʔ ⟨'⟩
Nasal	m ⟨m⟩	ŋ ⟨ng⟩	ɲ ⟨ny⟩	n̪ ⟨nh⟩	n ⟨n⟩		
Trill					r ⟨rr⟩		
Approximant	w ⟨w⟩		j ⟨y⟩		l ⟨l⟩	ɻ ⟨r⟩	

== Vocabulary/Topical Index ==
The following is a sample of words from a comparative wordlist/topical index produced by Philip Hamilton. The Pakanha words are accompanied by corresponding words from the distantly related Uw Olkola and Uw Oykangand languages:

(P) = Pakanha, (Olk) = Uw Olkola, (Oyk) = Uw Oykangand.

The Body:

- Body
  - nhangka (P)
  - idnhan (Olk, Oyk)
  - elpan (Olk)
- Head
  - wele (P)
  - eka (Olk)
  - e.g. (Oyk)
- Fontanel
  - wele ngangka (P)
  - ek ulpar (Olk)
  - e.g. ulbar (Oyk)
- Skull
  - yenkan (P)
  - ek obher (Olk)
  - e.g. opher (Oyk)

== In popular culture ==
The Pakanha word for the eastern grey kangaroo, kucha, was used as the name of a tribe on the second season of the American reality television series, Survivor in 2001.
