= Language and spatial cognition =

The question whether the use of language influences spatial cognition is closely related to theories of linguistic relativity—also known as the Sapir-Whorf hypothesis—which states that the structure of a language affects cognitive processes of the speaker. Debates about this topic are mainly focused on the extent to which language influences spatial cognition or if it does at all. Research also concerns differences between perspectives on spatial relations across cultures, what these imply, and the exploration of potentially partaking cognitive mechanisms.

== Frames of reference across cultures ==
Research shows that frames of reference for spatial cognition differ across cultures and that language could play a crucial role in structuring these different frames. Three types of perspectives on space can be distinguished:

- The Relative perspective (dominant in Dutch, English, and Japanese) is dependent on the viewer's position towards the object and often uses descriptions like "the object is to the left/right of ...".
- The Absolute perspective (found in speakers of Arrernte, Guugu Yimithirr, Kuuk Thaayore, and Tzeltal) is based on cardinal directions such as north, east, south, and west. Therefore, the description of the location of an object does not change according to the position towards it.
- The Intrinsic perspective (found in speakers of Mopan and Totonac) describes the location of an object without referring to yourself or the use of cardinal directions. Instead it uses the relation towards another object to specify spatial relations (e.g. "the object is at the back/front/side of ...").

Languages like English or Dutch do not exclusively make use of relative descriptions but these appear to be most frequent compared to intrinsic or absolute descriptions. An absolute frame of reference is usually restricted to large scale geographical descriptions in these languages. Speakers of the Australian languages Arrernte, Guugu Yimithirr, and Kuuk Thaayore only use absolute descriptions. The relative and intrinsic perspectives seem to be connected as there is no known language which applies only one of these frames of reference exclusively.

== Two views on spatial cognition ==
(1.) It has been argued that people universally use an egocentric representation to solve non-linguistic spatial tasks which would align with the relative frame of reference. (2.) Other researchers have proposed that people apply multiple frames of reference during their daily lives and that languages reflect these cognitive structures. In the light of the current body of literature the second view seems to be the more plausible one.

== Directional gestures ==
The dominant frames of reference have found to be reflected in the common types of gesticulation in the respective language. Speakers of absolute languages would typically represent an object moving north with a hand movement towards the north. Whereas speakers of relative languages typically depict a movement of an object to the right with a hand movement to the right, independent of the direction they are facing during speech. Speakers of intrinsic languages would, for example, typically represent human movement from the perspective of the mover with a sagittal hand gesture away from the speaker.

== The spatial representation of time ==
A study by Boroditsky and Gaby compared speakers of an absolute language—Pormpuraawans—with English speakers. The task on which they compared them consisted of the spatial arrangement of cards which showed a temporal progression. The result was that the speakers of the relative language (Americans) exclusively chose to represent time spatially as progressing from left (earlier time) to right (later time). Whereas the Pormpuraawans took the direction they faced into account and preferred to depict time as progressing from east (earlier time) to west (later time) the most.

== Third variables ==
Confounding variables could potentially explain a significant proportion of the measured difference in performance between the linguistic frames of reference. These can be categorized into three types of confounding factors:

- Environmental factors (e.g. rural vs. urban or open terrain vs. dense forest) could influence linguistic and non-linguistic categories.
- Global cognitive styles (e.g. individualism vs. collectivism) could act as a mediator between language and cognition.
- Differences in habitual action (could be reflected in subsistence patterns) might shape the differing use of frames of reference in language and cognition.

=== The importance of language for cognition ===
Gentner, Özyürek, Gürcanli, and Goldin-Meadow found that deaf children, who lacked a conventional language, did not use gestures to convey spatial relations (see home sign). Building on that, they showed that deaf children performed significantly worse on a task of spatial cognition compared to hearing children. They concluded that the acquisition of (spatial) language is an important factor in shaping spatial cognition.

== Cognitive mechanisms ==
Several mechanisms accounting for or contributing to the possible effect of language on cognition have been suggested:

- Perceptual tuning and attention: Experience (with language) can direct habitual attention so that perception becomes more oriented towards particular features in the environment.
- The novice-expert shift: Increased experience in a specific domain can lead to a recoding of representational units.
- Structure-mapping: When comparing conceptual representations based on similarities, language can influence what tends to be compared to what, by promoting the saliency of specific categories.
- Costs of computation: Based on the assumption of language promoting the formation of different categories, it would result that the cognitive effort to access the more salient frame of reference in the respective language (relative, absolute or intrinsic) is lower in comparison to switching to another frame.

== See also ==
- Barbara Landau § Relationship between spatial language and spatial cognition
