= WRW =

WRW or Wrw may refer to:

- Walter Ray Williams Jr., American professional bowler
- Warwick railway station, Warwickshire, England (station code WRW)
- All airports in Warsaw, Poland (IATA code WRW)
- 9th Weather Reconnaissance Wing of the US Air Force
- Mbariman-Gudhinma language (ISO 639-3 code WRW)
- Wrw (saint), also called Urw, a Welsh saint
