= YRM =

YRM, or yrm, may refer to:

- Yorke Rosenberg Mardall, a British architectural firm
- YRM, the IATA code for Rocky Mountain House Airport in Alberta, Canada
- yrm, the ISO 639-3 code for the Yirrk-Thangalkl dialect, spoken on the Cape York Peninsula, Queensland, Australia
- YRM, the National Rail code for Yarm railway station in North Yorkshire, UK
