= GGR =

GGR may refer to:

- Aghu Tharrnggala language
- Garowe Airport, in Puntland, Somalia
- Glucagon receptor
- Sunday Times Golden Globe Race
  - 2018 Golden Globe Race
- Greater German Reich, the official name of Nazi Germany between 1943 and 1945
  - Greater Germanic Reich, the political entity it tried to establish during World War II
- Greenhouse gas removal, projects to remove greenhouse gases from the atmosphere and so tackle global warming
- Groudle Glen Railway, on the Isle of Man
