= Marrett River language =

Extinct language of Queensland, Australia

Marrett River
- Urratjingu
- Region: Queensland
- Extinct: (date missing)
- Language family: Pama–Nyungan: (unclassified, but presumably Paman); Marrett River

Language codes
- ISO 639-3: None (mis)
- Glottolog: None
- AIATSIS: Y156
- Marrett River language (Queensland)

The Marrett River language, also known as Urratjingu, is an extinct Australian language of the Queensland coast. It remains unclassified, but is known to have been quite distinct from Flinders Island language to the east and from the various languages spoken by the Lama-Lama to its west.
