= Snake language =

Snake language may refer to:

- Snake Language, a 2006 album by Crawfish of Love, see Gary Duncan
- Kuuk Yak language, an extinct Paman language of Australia
- Parseltongue, a language used to communicate with snakes in the Harry Potter universe
- Shoshoni language of North America; see Sacagawea § Lewis and Clark Expedition

== See also ==
- Sake language
