= Aghu Tharrnggala language =

Extinct Australian Aboriginal language

Aghu Tharrnggala
- Gogo Mini
- Native to: Australia
- Region: Cape York Peninsula, Queensland
- Extinct: 2006
- Language family: Pama–Nyungan: Paman; Thaypan; Aghu Tharrnggala
- Writing system: unwritten

Language codes
- ISO 639-3: Either: gtu – Aghu-Tharnggala ggr – Aghu Tharnggalu (deprecated)
- Glottolog: aghu1254
- AIATSIS: Y65
- ELP: Aghu-Tharnggala

Aghu Tharrnggala is an extinct Paman language of the Cape York Peninsula in Queensland, Australia. Like several languages in the area, it is often referred to as Gogo Mini (Kuku-Mini) 'good speech'. Some sources treat Ikarranggali, and Alngula (Alungul) as synonyms. However, they are distinct languages.

Aghu Tharrnggala is demonstrably related to Kuku-Thaypan and Rarmul. The two may also have been related to Takalak, although there is insufficient information for this to be certain.

== Phonology ==
=== Consonants ===
The consonant phonemes of Aghu Tharrnggala are located in the chart below.

		Bilabial		Apical	Dental	Palatal		Velar	
Nasal			m	n̺	n̪	ȵ			ŋ
Plosive		p͉		t̺͉		ȶ͉		k͉	
Tense		p͈		t̺͈	t̪͈, t̪͉	ȶ͈		k͈	
Trill				r̺					
Approximant	Median			ɹ̺			j		w
Approximant	Lateral			l̺					

=== Vowels ===
	Front	Central	Back
Close	i	ɨ	u
Close-mid	e		o
Mid		ə	
Open	a		

== Bibliography ==
- Jolly, L. (1989). Aghu Tharrnggala, a language of the Princess Charlotte Bay region of Cape York Peninsula (BA honours thesis). University of Queensland.
