= YYR =

YYR or yyr may refer to:

- YYR, IATA code for CFB Goose Bay, Royal Canadian Air Force base
- yyr, ISO 639-3 code for Yir-Yoront language, Australian Aboriginal language
