= WIJ =

WIJ or wij may refer to:

- WIJ, the National Rail station code for Willesden Junction station, London, England
- wij, the ISO 639-3 code for Wik-Iiyanh language, Cape York Peninsula, Queensland, Australia
