= Yir-Yoront =

Indigenous Australian people

Regions with significant populations
- Australia

Languages
- Yir-Yoront, English

Related ethnic groups
- Yirrk-Thangalkl, Kokopera, Thaayorre, Uw Olkola, Uw Oykangand

The Yir-Yoront, also known as the Yir Yiront, are an Indigenous Australian people of the Cape York Peninsula now living mostly in Kowanyama (kawn yamar or 'many waters') but also in Lirrqar/Pormpuraaw, both towns outside their traditional lands.

== Language ==
Yir-Yoront belongs to the Pama-Maric group of the Pama-Nyungan language family. Etymologically their language and the ethnonym derived from it are composed of yirrq (speech) and yorront. Several roots for Yorront have been proposed, one suggesting it is derived from yorr(l) (thus, like this), this-style denominations for tribal languages being not infrequent in Australia. Alpher argues that the more convincing etymon is yorr (sand), sandridges constituting the core geomorphic feature of Yir Yoront traditional territory. To support this interpretation he notes that an alternative voice for both the people and the language is Yirr-Thuchm, where thuch denotes a sandridge.

The Yoront adopt sign language when people withdraw from their social world, or are ashamed of themselves.

== Country ==
The earliest explorers came across the Yir-Yoront in their traditional lands, each sectioned according to patrilineal clan divisions, at the separate mouths of the Mitchell River, and also the mouth of the Coleman River, and the land on the coastal strip between them. Norman Tindale estimated their overall tribal grounds as covering approximately 500 square miles (1,300 km^{2}).

== Mythology ==
Pam-nhing were the ancestral supernatural beings responsible for both the creation of the world and for the way the group was organized socially. Every site was associated with its ancestral pam-nhing owner, to whom living Yir-Yoront owners were related through the male line. The word also signified a doppelganger or guardian spirit, distinct from both one's mang (reflection, image) and the pam-ngerrr or inner soul, pulse, breath of a person.

== Society ==
Yir-Yoront land divisions were based on patrilineal clans, each of which had a swathe of territory segments of which, on the birth of individual clan-members was then assigned to members according to their respective conception totems (lerrn nerp). That is, their names (nhaprr) were drawn from their clan totems (purrn). This territory extended into the tribal areas of the Kuuk-Thaayorre and Yirrq-mayn (Bakanh) to their north and northwest through political alliances and exogamous marriages that led to Yir-Yoront people adopting other languages ). Their clan system was composed of two moieties, the Pam-Pip and the Pam-Lul.

== Ontology ==
The Yir-Yoront distinguishes ordinary humans (pam-morr) where morr denotes 'real', from beings in the other world or realm of the dead, spirits and malevolent beings (wangrr), from dreamed entities (pitthar), and the ancestral beings of the primal time of Creation (pam-wolhlvm, pam-nhing, pam-kopw, pam-ngulgl). By metaphoric extension whites fall outside the category of real beings (morr) and are classified under wangrr, vagrant other world beings of malevolent intent.

Lerrn nerp, literally spirit-child, was the animating figure at conception, the natural object that was the agent of concept was conceived of as an 'image' (mang). While the father's role in conception is acknowledged, pregnancy itself takes place only when the lerrn nerp immigrates into the body during copulation.

== History ==
The Dutch exploratory mission under Jan Carstenszoon landed in 1623 on the coast where the Yir-Yoront dwelt, in order to trade for necessities. The logbook reports that the Dutch found a people who had "no knowledge of precious metals or spices". All the goods the Dutch gave in exchange were still in use among the Yir-Yoront save for pieces of iron and beads. The iron had never been incorporated into their totemic ideology.

A clash that in white man's memory became known as the "Battle of the Mitchell River", in 1864 between European colonists driving cattle under Francis Lascelles Jardine to the newly established station at Somerset and the probable forebears of the Yir-Yoront led to the death of some 30 odd tribesman with many more probably injured. It is judged to have been one of the rare instances in which Australian aboriginals stood their ground in the face of withering European gunfire for any length of time. During intensive field work in 1933–1935 the American anthropologist Lauriston Sharp failed to elicit any hint of a memory that the incident had occurred. The Australian anthropologist W.E.H Stanner cited the essay to question the very notion of a perduring and stable tradition within Aboriginal society, since it appeared that crucial events could vanish from memory within a brief period. Nonie Sharp however stated much later that the event was still fresh in the memories of the dispersed tribes living in Kowanyama down to the present day.

Down to the 1930s the Yir-Yoront were relatively autonomous, living in areas not at that time subject to pastoralist expropriation. They were then drawn into the Mitchell River Mission and also, soon after, in 1942, at Edward River Mission (known to the Yir-Yoront as Lirrqar, though now known by its Kuuk-Thaayorre name, Pormpuraaw), with the ready availability of steel axes and fishhooks living on the missions afforded, together with sugar and tobacco. The introduction of steel tools, it is argued, radically disrupted the culture, since even rock axes were not fashioned by the Yir-Yoront, whose territory was short on suitable rock outcrops, and who had to get them through long-distance trade and exchange networks. Once nearby purchase became accessible, the facility had a revolutionizing ripple down effect of disruption on the earlier exchange system, breaking the monopoly of the elders. Older men avoided initially the missions, and thus the young men and women could obtain the much-sought axes there without having to wait on their male elders, obey the ritual traditions, but simply in exchange for their labour at the missions.

== "They don't work" ==
In 1958 Lauriston Sharp argued that the Yir-Yoront were devoid of politics because they could only think of relationship in terms of kinship system. This was cited in turn by Marshall Sahlins in his Stone Age Economics who argued that while what we call institutional differentiation exists among them, they do not, as civilized people do, draw a clear line between work and play. The economist Robert L. Heilbroner took this to mean that the concept of work was absent from the most primitive societies, such as the Trobriand Islanders, the !Kung and, citing for this Sahlins' ostensible authority, also the Yir-Yoront, who, he asserted 'use the same word for work and play'. Barry Alpher showed that though their word 'woq' looks like a post-colonial borrowing from English 'work', it can be paralleled in other aboriginal languages cf. 'wuku' attested in the Djabugay language. For the Yir-Yoront, therefore, woq is applied to 'activity of any kind done for a boss and/or (for) pay.' Heilbroner's prominent claim was flawed from the start.

== Alternative names ==
- Koka-mungin
- KokoMandjoen, Koko-manjoen
- Kokomindjan
- KokoMindjin, Kokominjan, KokoMinjen
- Yir-yiront

Source: Tindale 1974, p. 171

== Some words ==
- wart' (bad)
- wart'uwər (woman) (Note: The word for 'woman' comes from the reduplication of the word for 'bad'. Alpher notes:'It is probably through some such associations ('fertility' or 'taboo'- perhaps via the prohibition against women viewing sacred things) that 'woman' has come to be expressed by a reduplicated form of 'bad' in Coastal Southwest Pama.' (Alpher 1972, p. 83))

== Sources ==
- Alpher, Barry (1972). "On the Genetic Subgrouping of the Languages of Southwestern Cape York Peninsula, Australia". Oceanic Linguistics. 11 (2): 67–87. doi:10.2307/3622803. JSTOR 3622803.
- Alpher, Barry (1991). Yir-Yoront Lexicon: Sketch and Dictionary of an Australian Language. Walter de Gruyter. ISBN 978-3-110-87265-1.
- Heilbroner, Robert L. (1989). Behind the Veil of Economics: Essays in the Worldly Philosophy. W. W. Norton & Company. ISBN 978-0-393-24263-8.
- Kendon, Adam (1988). Sign Languages of Aboriginal Australia: Cultural, Semiotic and Communicative Perspectives. Cambridge University Press. ISBN 978-0-521-36008-1.
- Mitchell, Scott (2003). "Guns or barter? Indigenous exchange networks and the mediation of conflict in post-contact western Arnhem Land". In Clarke, Anne; Torrence, Robin (eds.). The Archaeology of Difference: Negotiating Cross-Cultural Engagements in Oceania. Routledge. pp. 187–220. ISBN 978-1-134-82842-5.
- Roberts, Tony (2005). Frontier Justice: A History of the Gulf Country to 1900. University of Queensland Press. ISBN 978-0-702-24083-6.
- Sahlins, Marshall (1974) [First published 1968]. Stone Age Economics. Transaction Publishers. ISBN 978-0-202-36931-0.
- Schiffer, Michael B. (2016). Behavioral Archaeology: Principles and Practice. Routledge. ISBN 978-1-134-90372-6.
- Sharp, Nonie (2002). Saltwater People: The Waves of Memory. University of Toronto Press. p. 240. ISBN 978-0-802-08549-8.
- Sharp, R. Lauriston (June 1934). "The Social Organization of the Yir-Yoront Tribe, Cape York Peninsula (Part 1. Kinship and the Family". Oceania. 4 (4): 404–431. doi:10.1002/j.1834-4461.1934.tb00120.x. JSTOR 27976162.
- Sharp, R. Lauriston (1958). "People without Politics: The Australian Yir Yoront". In Ray, V. F. (ed.). Systems of Political Control and Bureaucracy in Human Societies. American Ethnological Society. pp. 1–8.
- Sharp, R. Lauriston (1968). "Steel Axes for Stone–Age Australians". In Cohen, Yehudi A. (ed.). Man in Adaptation: The Cultural Present (2nd ed.). Transaction Publishers. pp. 116–127. ISBN 978-0-202-36721-7.
- Shershow, Scott Cutler (2005). The Work and the Gift. University of Chicago Press. ISBN 978-0-226-75257-0.
- Stanner, W. E. H. (2014). On Aboriginal Religion. Sydney University Press. ISBN 978-1-743-32388-5.
- Tindale, Norman Barnett (1974). "Jirjoront (QLD)". Aboriginal Tribes of Australia: Their Terrain, Environmental Controls, Distribution, Limits, and Proper Names. Australian National University Press. Archived from the original on 6 May 2021.
