= Kugu Nganhcara =

Aboriginal Australian people

The Kugu Nganhcara, also Wikngenchera, Wik-Ngandjara (Ngandjara) are an Australian group of peoples living in the middle western part of the Cape York Peninsula, Queensland in Australia. Today they are primarily concentrated at Aurukan and the Edward river settlement.

== Language ==
Kugu Nganhcara is a Wik-language complex (Note: 'There is no single language which can usefully be referred to as Wik-Nganychara for this term covers a number of dialects which differ quite markedly from each other.') consisting of six varieties or patrilects, Kugu Uwanh, Kugu Ugbanh, Kugu Yi'anh, Kugu Mi'inh, Kugu Miminh, and Wik Iyanh, where 'kugu' is a classifier for speech, and the following word the infinitive of the respective verbs for 'go'. These closely related languages are called patrilects by Steve Johnson since the respective groups belong to a society composed of patrilineal clans joined by exogamous relationships.

== Country ==
The northern bounds of the Kugu Nganhcara are around the Kendall River, and their southern limits are around Moonkan Creek, beyond which lie their southern neighbours the Thaayorre.

== Socio-linguistic division markers ==
The Kugu-Nganychara embrace the following groups:

- Kugu Miminh
- Kugu-Mu'inh
- Kugu Uwanh
- Kugu Ugbanh
- Kugu-Mangk
- Kugu Yi'anh
- Wik-Iiyanh
- Kugu Mi'ing
- Wik Iyanh (Note: The Wik Iyanh speak a language that looks like sharing close affinities with Wik-Mungkan, due to the flow of morphological features borrowed from the latter, and in the past had been classified as being a subgroup of the latter. According to Steve Johnson, comparative analysis suggests to the contrary that it forms part of the Kugu Nganhcara society though not as closely integrated as the other five clans.)

== Wiknantjara ==
Norman Tindale used this term to refer to a Kugu group he identified as that whose clan estates covered about 300 square miles (780 km^{2}) in the area between the mouths of the Holroyd River, which would appear to be coterminous with the area assigned to the Kugu Ugbanh. Peter Sutton remarks that this term does not refer to a single dialect, but covers all the clans forming part of a dialect chain between the Kendall and Holroyd Rivers, and that the local name for the cluster is local term is Kugu-Nganycharra (known at Cape Keerweer as Wik-Ngenycharra.

== Sources ==
- "Y59: KUGU NGANHCARA". AIATSIS. 26 July 2019.
- Gaby, Alice (2005). "Some participants are More Equal than Others and the Composition of Arguments in Kuuk Thaayorre Competition and Variation in Natural Languages: The Case for Case". In Amberber, Mengistu; de Hoop, Helen (eds.). Perspectives on Cognitive Science. Elsevier. pp. 9–39. ISBN 978-0-080-45977-6.
- Johnson, Steve (1991). "Social Parameters of linguistic change in an unstratified Aboriginal society". In Baldi, Philip (ed.). Patterns of Change, Change of Patterns: Linguistic Change and Reconstruction Methodology. Walter de Gruyter. pp. 203–218. ISBN 978-3-110-13405-6.
- McConnel, Ursula H. (September 1939). "Social Organization of the Tribes of Cape York Peninsula, North Queensland". Oceania. 10 (1): 54–72. doi:10.1002/j.1834-4461.1939.tb00256.x. JSTOR 40327744.
- McConnel, Ursula H. (June 1940). "Social Organization of the Tribes of Cape York Peninsula, North Queensland (Continued)". Oceania. 10 (4): 434–455. doi:10.1002/j.1834-4461.1940.tb00305.x. JSTOR 40327867.
- von Sturmer, John Richard (1978). The Wik Economy, Territoriality and Totemism in Western Cape York Peninsula, North Queensland (PhD). University of Queensland.
- Sutton, Peter (1979). Wik: Aboriginal society, territory and language at Cape Keerweer, Cape York Peninsula, Australia (PDF) (PhD thesis). University of Queensland.
- Tindale, Norman Barnett (1974). "Wiknantjara (QLD)". Aboriginal Tribes of Australia: Their Terrain, Environmental Controls, Distribution, Limits, and Proper Names. Australian National University. ISBN 978-0-708-10741-6.
