= Gugu Dhaw language =

Australian Aboriginal language

Kok Thawa
- Gugu Dhaw
- Native to: Australia
- Region: Cape York Peninsula, Queensland
- Language family: Pama–Nyungan: Paman; Southwestern; Coastal; Koko Pera; Kok Thawa

Language codes
- ISO 639-3: None (mis)
- Glottolog: koko1272
- AIATSIS: Y93

Kok Thawa (Kok Thaw, Gugu Dhaw), also known as Koko Petitj, Uw Inhal, or Ogh Injigharr, is a Paman language of the Cape York Peninsula, Queensland in Australia.
