= Yir-Yoront language =

Australian Aboriginal language

Yir-Yoront
- Yir
- Native to: Australia
- Region: Cape York Peninsula, Queensland
- Ethnicity: Yir-Yoront
- Extinct: by 2005
- Language family: Pama–Nyungan: Paman; Southwestern; Coastal; Yir-Yoront
- Dialects: Yirr-Thutjim (Yir-Yoront); Yirrk-Thangalkl (Yirrk-Mel)
- Signed forms: Yir Yoront Sign Language

Language codes
- ISO 639-3: Either: yyr – Yir Yoront yrm – Yirrk-Mel
- Glottolog: yiry1247 yiry1245 bookkeeping with bibliography
- AIATSIS: Y72 Yir Yoront, Y214 Yirrk-Thangalkl
- ELP: Yir-Yoront

Yir-Yoront was a Paman language spoken in two settlements, Kowanyama and Pormpuraaw on the southwestern part of the Cape York Peninsula, Queensland in Australia, by the Yir-Yoront people. In 1991 only 15 speakers remained, with the rest of the Yir-Yoront people speaking English or even Kuuk Thaayorre as many speakers of Yir-Yoront apparently are using Kuuk Thaayorre in daily conversation. At present it is thought to be extinct. There are two sister dialects, Yir-Yoront proper and Yirrk-Thangalkl, which are very close. The shared name Yir is sometimes used for both taken together.

== Names ==
The first part of both of the name, Yir, is from the word yirrq meaning speech or language. Following is the ethnonym.

Yir-Yoront is written hyphenated as a way of indicating that the syllable following the hyphen is stressed. In the standard orthography, it is correctly spelled Yirr-Yorront, with "rr" representing the consonant /r/. There is a valid alternative pronunciation with stress on the first syllable; this can be written YirrqYorront. Other spellings encountered include Yir Yoront and Jir Joront.

Other names for the language include:

- Yirr-Thuchm: Meaning "from the sandridges"
- Kok-Minychen: The name of the Yir-Yoront in the Koko-Bera language
  - Koko-Minychena: Alternative spelling
  - Kokomindjen: Alternative spelling
  - Mandjoen: Alternative spelling
  - Mind'jana: Alternative spelling
  - Mundjun: Alternative spelling
  - Myunduno: Alternative spelling
- Kuuk-Thaanhon: The name of the Yir-Yoront in the Kuuk Thaayorre language
- Gwandera: A name incorrectly applied to the Yir-Yoront people and their language
- Millera: No source available

== Phonology ==
The following description is for Yir-Yoront proper. For another dialect, see Yirrk-Thangalkl dialect.

=== Vowels ===
Yir-Yoront has 6 vowels:

	Front	Central	Back
	Unrounded	Unrounded	Rounded
Close	i		u
Close-mid	e		o
Mid		ə	
Open		a	

=== Consonants ===
Yir-Yoront has 20 consonants:

	Peripheral		Laminal		Apical		Glottal
	Bilabial	Velar	Postalveolar /Palatal	Dental	Alveolar	Retroflex	Glottal
Nasal	m ⟨m⟩	ŋ ⟨ng⟩	ɲ ⟨ny⟩	n̪ ⟨nh⟩	n ⟨n⟩	ɳ ⟨rn⟩	
Plosive	p ⟨p⟩	k ⟨k⟩	c ⟨ch⟩	t̪ ⟨th⟩	t ⟨t⟩	ʈ ⟨rt⟩	ʔ ⟨q⟩
Tap					ɾ ⟨rr⟩		
Lateral				l̪ ⟨lh⟩	l ⟨l⟩	ɭ ⟨rl⟩	
Approximant	w ⟨w⟩		j ⟨y⟩			ɻ ⟨r⟩	

== Sign language ==
The Yir Yoront have (or had) a well-developed signed form of their language. It may have had some influence in the broader Far North Queensland Indigenous Sign Language, though it may have gone extinct too early for that.
