= The Giant Devil Dingo =

Book by Dick Roughsey

- Author: Dick Roughsey
- Illustrator: Dick Roughsey
- Cover artist: Dick Roughsey
- Language: English
- Subject: Aboriginal Australians - Folklore. Legends - Queensland - Cape York Peninsula. Dingo - Folklore.
- Genre: children, legends
- Publisher: Collins, Sydney
- Publication date: 1973
- Publication place: Australia
- Pages: 34 (Hardback)
- ISBN: 0-17-006470-0

The Giant Devil Dingo (1973) is a picture book for children by Dick Roughsey. It describes how the dreamtime devil-dingo, Gaiya, of lower Cape York Peninsula mythology was reborn and domesticated to become man's friend and helper.

Artwork from the book is held by the National Museum of Australia.

== Reception ==
Kirkus Reviews wrote "The appendix might better have been a preface ... But the chase and basic situation (in Europe the hungry pursuers would be a witch and her familiar) are as easy to grasp as the peculiarly Australian flavor is authentic. And despite the sameness of the scenes—repetitive in scale, perspective and color—Roughsey's flat, clay colored paintings (with dabs of green for foliage) are the more effective for their amateur look—especially where that huge-tongued, red-eyed dingo opposes the small, faceless, dimly differentiated humans." while The Aboriginal Child at School called it "a highly successful book."The Giant Devil Dingo has also been reviewed by The Sydney Morning Herald and Reading Time. The book was selected for the 2010 NSW Premier's Reading Challenge, and was commended in the 1974 Children's Book Council of Australia awards for Children's Picture Book of the Year.
