= Southern Athabaskan grammar =

Grammar of South Athabaskan languages

Southern Athabaskan (also Apachean, Southern Athabascan) is a branch of the Athabaskan language family spoken in the North American Southwest.

== Typological overview ==
Typologically, Southern Athabaskan languages are mostly fusional, polysynthetic, nominative–accusative head-marking languages. These languages are argued to be non-configurational languages. The canonical word order is SOV, as can be seen in Lipan example below:

Kónitsąąhį́į́ dziłádałts’aa’híí áí daajiłdiił "The Lipan ate those wild grapes."

Subject = Kónitsąąhį́į́ "the Lipan"
Object = dziłádałts’aa’híí áí "those wild grapes" (dziłádałts’aa’híí "wild grapes", áí "those")
Verb = daajiłdiił "they ate them"

Southern Athabaskan words are modified primarily by prefixes, which is uncommon for SOV languages (suffixes are expected).

The Southern Athabaskan languages are "verb-heavy"—they have a great ponderance of verbs but relatively few nouns. In addition to verbs and nouns, these languages have other elements such as pronouns, clitics of various functions, demonstratives, numerals, adverbs, and conjunctions, among others. Harry Hoijer grouped most of the above into a word class which he called particle based on the type of inflection that occurs on the word class. This categorization provides three main lexical categories (i.e. parts of speech):

1. verbs
2. nouns/postpositions
3. particles

There is nothing that corresponds to what are called adjectives in English. Adjectival notions are provided by verbs; however, these adjectival verb stems do form a distinct sub-class of verb stems which co-occur with adjectival prefixes.

== Nouns ==
SA nouns are essentially of the following types (with various subtypes):

1. simple nouns
2. compound nouns
3. nouns derived from verbs/verb phrases (deverbal noun)

The simple nouns can consist of only a noun stem (which are usually only a single syllable long), such as

- Chiricahua: ku̧u̧ "fire", and
- Navajo: sǫ’ "star".

Other nouns may consist of a noun plus one or more prefixes, such as

- Navajo: dibé "sheep" (< di- + -bé; stem: -bé)

or of a noun plus an enclitic or suffix, such as

- Chiricahua: dlú̧í "prairie dog" (< dlú̧- + -í; stem: dlú̧-).

The added prefixes may be lexical or they may be inflectional prefixes (e.g. personal prefixes indicating possession). SA languages do not have many simple nouns, but these nouns are the most ancient part of the lexicon and thus are essential in making comparisons between Athabaskan languages.

Another noun type is a noun compound consisting of more than one noun stem, such as

- Chiricahua: ku̧u̧ba̧a̧ "fireside" (< ku̧u̧ "fire" + ba̧a̧ "edge"), and
- Navajo: tsésǫ’ "glass" (< tsé "rock" + sǫ" star").

Other kinds of noun compounds are the following:

- noun stem + postposition
- noun stem + verb stem
- noun stem + postposition + noun stem

Many other various combinations of elements are possible.

The most common type of noun is the deverbal noun (i.e., a noun derived from a verb). Most of these nouns are formed by adding a nominalizing enclitic, such as Mescalero -ń or -í, Western Apache -í and Navajo -í, to the end of the verb phrase. For example, in Mescalero the verb ’ént’į́į́ "he/she bewitches him/her" may become a noun by adding either the enclitic -ń (for people) or -í (for things):

- ’ént’į́į́ "he or she bewitches him or her"
- ’ént’į́į́ń "witch"
- ’ént’į́į́’í "witchcraft"

Thus, the word ’ént’į́į́ń "witch" literally means "the one who bewitches him or her". Another example is from Navajo:

- ná’oolkiłí "clock" (lit. "one that is moved slowly in a circle")

Many of these nouns may be quite complex, as in Navajo

- chidí naa’na’í bee’eldǫǫhtsoh bikáá’ dah naaznilígíí "army tank" (lit. "a car that they sit up on top of that crawls around with a big thing with which an explosion is made")

Other deverbal nouns do not appear with a nominalizing enclitic, as in Navajo

- Hoozdo "Phoenix, Arizona" (lit. "the place is hot")
- ch’é’étiin "doorway" (lit. "something has a path horizontally out")

For a comparison with nouns in a Northern Athabaskan language, see Carrier: Nouns

=== Noun inflection ===
==== Possession ====
===== Prefixes =====
Most nouns can be inflected to show possession. Simple nouns, compound nouns, and some deverbal nouns are inflected by adding a pronominal prefix to the noun base, as in the following Chiricahua possessed noun paradigm (i.e. noun declension):

Chiricahua nouns with pronominal prefixes
shibán	"my bread"	(shi- 1st person singular + bán "bread")
nahibán	"our/your bread"	(nahi- 1st/2nd person dual)
nibán	"your bread"	(ni- 2nd person singular)
bibán	"her/his/its/their bread"	(bi- 3rd person)
gobán	"her/his/their bread" (polite)	(go- 4th/3a. person)
’ibán	"someone's bread"	(’i- indefinite)

As seen above, Chiricahua nouns are inflected for number (singular and dual) and person (first, second, third, fourth, and indefinite). In the third and indefinite persons, there is only one pronominal prefix bi- and ’i- (that is, Chiricahua does not have two different prefixes for the third person singular and the third person dual). Additionally, although there is a first person singular shi- and a second person singular ni-, in the plural Chiricahua only has one prefix nahi- for both the first and second persons (that is, nahi- means both first and second person plural). A distributive plural prefix daa- may also be added to possessed nouns in front of the pronominal prefixes:

Chiricahua nouns with distributive plural
daanahibán	"our/your bread"	(daa- + nahi- + bán)
daabibán	"their bread"	(daa- + bi- + bán)
daagobán	"their bread"	(daa- + go- + bán)
daa’ibán	"some persons' bread"	(daa- + ’i- + bán)

The prefix table below shows these relationships:

Chiricahua pronominal prefixes
Person	Singular	Dual	Plural (distrib.)
1st	shi-	nahi-	daa-nahi-
2nd	ni-	nahi-	daa-nahi-
3rd	bi-		daa-bi-
4th	go-		daa-go-
indef.	’i-		daa-’i-

A Navajo pronominal prefix paradigm may be compared with the Chiricahua above:

Navajo pronominal prefixes
Person	Singular	Dual	Plural (distrib.)
1st	shi-	nihi-	da-nihi-
2nd	ni-	nihi-	da-nihi-
3rd	bi-		da-bi-
4th	ho-/ha-		da-ha-
indef.	(’)a-	–	–

Two other pronominal prefixes include the reciprocal prefix as in Mescalero ’ił- and Navajo ał- "each other's" and the reflexive prefix as in Mescalero ’ádi- and Navajo ádi- "one's own".

===== Phrase formation =====
Larger possessive phrases can be formed like the following Navajo phrases:

Navajo possessive phrases
John bibááh	"John's bread"	(bi- 3rd person singular, bááh "bread")
shimá bibááh	"my mother's bread"	(shi- 1st person singular, -má "mother")
bimá bibááh	"his mother's bread"
John bimá bibááh	"John's mother's bread"

As seen above, the possessor occurs before the possessed noun(s). Thus, in order to say "John's bread", the 3rd person prefix bi- is added to the possessed noun bááh "bread" and the possessor noun John is placed before bibááh "his bread". Usually, in the first and second persons only a pronominal prefix (shi-, ni-, and nihi-) is added to possessed nouns. However, if focusing on the possessor (i.e. a type of emphasis) is needed, an independent personal pronoun may be added to the possessive phrase. Thus, we have the following

Navajo possessive phrases
shimá bibááh	"my mother's bread"
shí shimá bibááh	"MY mother's bread"	(shí 1st person singular pronoun)
nihitaa’ bibááh	"our father's bread"	(nihi- 1st/2nd person dual prefix, -taa’ "father")
nihí nihitaa’ bibááh	"OUR father's bread"	(nihí 1st/2nd person dual pronoun)

By observing these Navajo possessive phrases, it is evident here that Southern Athabaskan languages are head-marking in that the possessive prefix is added to the possessed noun, which is the head of the noun phrase (this is unlike the dependent-marking languages of Europe where possessive affixes are added to the possessor).

===== Stem modification =====
- absolute vs. possessed vs. compound (combining) forms
- voicing
- vocalic suffixes

===== Alienable vs. inalienable =====
- Alienability: Alienable and inalienable possession
- Possession (linguistics)#Inherent and non-inherent (constantly possessed)
- associated semantic changes

== Clitics ==
- proclitics
- enclitics
- postpositional enclitics

== Verbs ==
The key element in Southern Athabaskan languages is the verb, and it is notoriously complex. Verbs are composed of a stem to which inflectional and/or derivational prefixes are added. Every verb must have at least one prefix. The prefixes are affixed to the verb in a specified order.

The Southern Athabaskan verb can be sectioned into different morphological components. The verb stem is composed of an abstract root and an often fused suffix. The stem together with a classifier prefix (and sometimes other thematic prefixes) make up the verb theme. The theme is then combined with derivational prefixes which in turn make up the verb base. Finally, inflectional prefixes (which Young & Morgan call "paradigmatic prefixes") are affixed to the base—producing a complete verb. This is represented schematically in the table below:

root
stem	= root + suffix
theme	= stem + classifier (+ thematic prefix(es))
base	= theme + derivational prefix(es)
verb	= base + inflectional prefix(es)

=== Verb template ===
The prefixes that occur on a verb are added in specified order according to prefix type. This type of morphology is called a position class template (or slot-and-filler template). Below is a table of one proposal of the Navajo verb template (Young & Morgan 1987). Edward Sapir and Harry Hoijer were the first to propose an analysis of this type. A given verb will not have a prefix for every position, in fact most Navajo verbs are not as complex as the template would seem to suggest.

The Navajo verb has 3 main parts:

disjunct prefixes	conjunct prefixes	STEM

These parts can be subdivided into 11 positions with some of the positions having even further subdivisions:

Disjunct
0	1a	1b	1c	1d	1e	2	3
object	null postposition	derivational-thematic	reflexive	reversionary	semeliterative	iterative	distributive plural

Conjunct								STEM
4	5	6a	6b	6c	7	8	9	10
direct object	deictic subject	thematic-derivational-aspect	thematic-derivational-aspect	transitional-semelfactive	modal-aspectual	subject	"classifier"	stem

Although prefixes are generally found in a specific position, some prefixes change order by the process of metathesis. For example, in Navajo prefix ’a- (3i object pronoun) usually occurs before di-, as in

adisbąąs 'I'm starting to drive some kind of wheeled vehicle along' [ < ’a- + di- + sh- + ł- + -bąąs].

However, when ’a- occurs with the prefixes di- and ni-, the ’a- metathesizes with di-, leading to an order of di- + ’a- + ni-, as in

di’nisbąąs 'I'm in the act of driving some vehicle (into something) & getting stuck' [ < di-’a-ni-sh-ł-bąąs < ’a- + di- + ni- + sh- + ł- + -bąąs]

instead of the expected *adinisbąąs (’a-di-ni-sh-ł-bąąs) (’a- is reduced to ’-). Metathesis is conditioned by phonological environment (Young & Morgan 1987:39).

=== Verb stems and mode and aspect ===
Verb stems have different forms that alternate according to aspect and tense. The alternation (ablaut) mostly involves vowels (change in vowel, vowel length, or nasality) and tone, but sometimes includes the suffixation of a final consonant. The Chiricahua verb stems below have five different forms that correspond to mode:

stem form	mode	stem form	mode
-k’áásh	imperfective ('to sharpen')	-ghee	imperfective ('to move quickly')
-k’aazh	perfective	-ghu	perfective
-k’ash	progressive	-ghuł	progressive
-k’ash	iterative	-ghu	iterative
-k’áásh	optative	-ghee	optative

Each mode can also occur with different aspects, such as momentaneous, continuative, repetitive, semelfactive, etc. For example, a stem can be momentaneous imperfective, momentaneous perfective, momentaneous optative, etc. The (partial) Navajo verb stem conjugation below illustrates the verb stem -’aah/-’ą́ "to handle a solid roundish object" with the same mode in different aspects:

stem form	mode	aspect	example verb	
-’aah	imperfective	momentaneous	haash’aah	'I'm extracting it'
-’á	imperfective	continuative	naash’á	'I'm carrying it'
-’a’	imperfective	distributive	bitaash’a’	'I'm passing it out to each one of them'
-’ááh	imperfective	reversative	náhásh’ááh	'I'm turning it around'

This same verb stem -’aah/-’ą́ "to handle a solid round object" has a total of 26 combinations of 5 modes and 6 aspects:

	Imperfective	Perfective	Progressive- Future	Usitative- Iterative	Optative
Momentaneous	’aah	’ą́	’ááł	’ááh	’ááł
Continuative	’á	’ą́	’aał	’aah	’aał
Distributive	’a’	’ą́	’aał	’aah	’a’
Reversative	’ááh	’ą́	’ááł	’ááh	’ááł
Transitional	’aah	’a’	’aał	’aah	’aah
Conative	’ááh	-	-	-	-

Although there are 26 combinations for this verb, there is a high degree of homophony, in that there are only 7 different stem forms (-’aah, -’ááh, -’aał, -’ááł, -’a’, -á, -’ą́). To complicate matters, different verbs have different patterns of homophony: some verbs have only 1 stem form that occurs in all mode-aspect combinations, others have 5 forms, etc., and not all stems occur in the same mode-aspect combinations. Additionally, the different stem forms of different verbs are formed in different ways.

=== Classificatory verbs ===
Southern Athabaskan languages have verb stems that classify a particular object by its shape or other physical characteristics in addition to describing the movement or state of the object. These are known in Athabaskan linguistics as classificatory verb stems. These are usually identified by an acronym label. There are 11 primary classificatory "handling" verbs stems in Navajo which are listed below (given in the perfective mode). Other Southern Athabaskan languages have a slightly different set of stems.

Classifier+Stem	Label	Explanation	Examples
-'ą́	SRO	Solid Roundish Object	bottle, ball, boot, box, etc.
-yį́	LPB	Load, Pack, Burden	backpack, bundle, sack, saddle, etc.
-ł-jool	NCM	Non-Compact Matter	bunch of hair or grass, cloud, fog, etc.
-lá	SFO	Slender Flexible Object	rope, mittens, socks, pile of fried onions, etc.
-tą́	SSO	Slender Stiff Object	arrow, bracelet, skillet, saw, etc.
-ł-tsooz	FFO	Flat Flexible Object	blanket, coat, sack of groceries, etc.
-tłéé'	MM	Mushy Matter	ice cream, mud, slumped-over drunken person, etc.
-nil	PLO1	Plural Objects 1	eggs, balls, animals, coins, etc.
-jaa'	PLO2	Plural Objects 2	marbles, seeds, sugar, bugs, etc.
-ką́	OC	Open Container	glass of milk, spoonful of food, handful of flour, etc.
-ł-tį́	ANO	Animate Object	microbe, person, corpse, doll, etc.

To compare with English, Navajo has no single verb that corresponds to the English word give. In order to say the equivalent of Give me some hay! the Navajo verb níłjool (NCM) must be used, while for Give me a cigarette! the verb nítįįh (SSO) must be used. The English verb give is expressed by 11 verbs in Navajo, depending on the characteristics of the given object.

In addition to defining the physical properties of the object, primary classificatory verb stems also can distinguish between the manner of movement of the object. The stems can then be grouped into three categories:

1. handling
2. propelling
3. free flight

Handling includes actions such as carrying, lowering, and taking. Propelling includes tossing, dropping, and throwing. Free flight includes falling, and flying through space.

Using an example for the SRO category Navajo has

1. -'ą́ to handle (a round object),
2. -ne' to throw (a round object), and
3. -l-ts'id (a round object) moves independently.

In addition, Southern Athabaskan languages also have other somewhat similar verb stems that Young & Morgan (1987) call secondary classificatory verbs.

(The term classifier is used in Athabaskan linguistics to refer to a prefix that indicates transitivity or acts as a thematic prefix, and as such is somewhat of a misnomer. These transitivity classifiers are not involved in the classificatory verb stems' classification of nouns and are not related in any way to the noun classifiers found in Chinese or Thai).

=== yi-/bi- alternation (animacy) ===
Like most Athabaskan languages, Southern Athabaskan languages show various levels of animacy in its grammar, with certain nouns taking specific verb forms according to their rank in this animacy hierarchy. For instance, Navajo nouns can be ranked by animacy on a continuum from most animate (a human or lightning) to least animate (an abstraction) (Young & Morgan 1987: 65-66):

humans/lightning → infants/big animals → mid-size animals → small animals → insects → natural forces → inanimate objects/plants → abstractions

Generally, the most animate noun in a sentence must occur first while the noun with lesser animacy occurs second. If both nouns are equal in animacy, then either noun can occur in the first position. So, both example sentences (1) and (2) are correct. The yi- prefix on the verb indicates that the 1st noun is the subject and bi- indicates that the 2nd noun is the subject.

(1)	Ashkii	at'ééd	yiníł'į́.
	boy	girl	yi-look
	'The boy is looking at the girl.'

(2)	At'ééd	ashkii	biníł'į́.
	girl	boy	bi-look
	'The girl is being looked at by the boy.'

But example sentence (3) sounds wrong to most Navajo speakers because the less animate noun occurs before the more animate noun:

(3)	* Tsídii	at'ééd	yishtąsh.
	bird	girl	yi-pecked
	'The bird pecked the girl.'

In order express this idea, the more animate noun must occur first, as in sentence (4):

(4)	At'ééd	tsídii	bishtąsh.
	girl	bird	bi-pecked
	'The girl was pecked by the bird.'

Although sentence (4) is translated into English with a passive verb, in Navajo it is not passive. Passive verbs are formed by certain classifier prefixes (i.e. transitivity prefixes) that occur directly before the verb stem in position 9.
