= Yirrk-Thangalkl dialect =

Yir-Yoront dialect of Australia

Yirrk-Thangalkl
- Yirrk-Mel
- Native to: Australia
- Region: Cape York Peninsula, Queensland
- Extinct: 2010s
- Language family: Pama–Nyungan: Paman; Southwestern; Coastal; Yir-Yoront; Yirrk-Thangalkl

Language codes
- ISO 639-3: yrm
- Glottolog: None
- AIATSIS: Y214

Yirrk-Thangalkl (Yir Thangedl) is a dialect of Yir-Yoront, a Paman language spoken on the southwestern part of the Cape York Peninsula, Queensland in Australia, by the Yirrk-Thangalkl people. The language is also known as Yirr-Thangell and Yirrk-Mel.

During the early 1900s (decade), Yirrk-Thangalkl speakers started shifting to the Yir-Yoront dialect with the arrival of the Mitchell River Mission.

== Phonology ==
=== Consonants ===
Yirrk-Thangalkl has 16 consonants. The inventory is the same as that of Yir-Yoront, except that Yirrk-Thangalkl lacks the retroflex and glottal consonants /ʈ/, /ɳ/, /ɭ / and /ʔ/.

	Peripheral		Laminal		Apical
	Bilabial	Velar	Postalveolar /Palatal	Dental	Alveolar
Nasal	m /m/	ng /ŋ/	ny /ɲ/	nh /n̪/	n /n/
Plosive	p /p/	k /k/		th /t̪/	t /t/
Affricate			ch /t͡ʃ/		
Trill					rr /r/
Tap					r /ɾ/
Approximant	w /w/		y /j/	lh /l̪/	l /l/
