= Morrobolam language =

Australian Aboriginal language

Morrobolam
- Umbuygamu, Morrobalama
- Native to: Australia
- Region: Queensland
- Ethnicity: Lamalama, possibly Barungguan
- Extinct: (date missing)
- Language family: Pama–Nyungan: Paman; Lamalamic; Morrobolam

Language codes
- ISO 639-3: umg
- Glottolog: umbu1256
- AIATSIS: Y55
- ELP: Umbuygamu

The Morrobolam language, formerly known as Morrobalama and Umbuygamu, is a possibly extinct Paman language from Princess Charlotte Bay in far-north Queensland in Australia which was spoken by the Lamalama people.

== History ==
In 1898, the Aboriginal population of the Princess Charlotte Bay area numbered around 1,000. However, white settlement of the region caused them to lose almost all of their traditional lands. The many Aboriginal groups of the region were forcibly moved to missions and were exposed to diseases like syphilis and Spanish influenza. This resulted in the Aboriginal population of the region declining by 90% from 1898 levels.

In the 1930s many of the surviving Aboriginal people were moved to the Old Lockhart River Mission. Those Aboriginal people who remained in their territory were from the several language groups of the Lamalama people: Morrobalam, Lamalama (also known as Mba Rumbathama), and Umpithamu (Umbindhamu) peoples, and lived there until 1961. During that time, most of the Aboriginal people worked on local cattle stations or were killed by mounted police. In 1961 the Aboriginal people who had remained on their lands were moved to the tip of the Cape York Peninsula.

By the 1990s, the total number of speakers was reduced to four elderly speakers. Only two of those speakers, Nancy Gunnawarra and Mabel Kullakulla, spoke the language on a regular basis. Most younger people of the community could understand the language but were unable to speak it.

The Pama Language Centre is drawing upon historical materials to assist in reviving the language.

== Naming and language relationships ==
The Austlang database formerly listed Morrobolam as Umbuygamu (an exonym; Morrobolam is a clan name). Quoting linguist Jean-Cristophe Verstraete (2018), it says that "Morrobalama" is a mistranscription, and that Lamalama, Rimanggudinhma (Mbariman-Gudhinma) and Morrobolam form a genetic subgroup of Paman known as Lamalamic, "defined by shared innovations in phonology and morphology". Within this subgroup, "Morrobolam and Lamalama form a phonologically innovative branch, while Rumanggudinhma forms a more conservative branch".

== Phonology ==
=== Vowels ===
Morrobolam's vowel system is typical of Australian Aboriginal languages in that it contains only five vowels.

Vowels
	Front	Back
Close	i	u
Close-mid	e	o
Open	a	

All vowels show contrastive vowel length.

=== Consonants ===
Unusually for an Australian language, Morrobolam has a relatively large consonantal inventory, including fricatives, prestopped consonants, and other consonants not normally found in Aboriginal Australian languages.

In this table, the orthographic symbols are ⟨in brackets⟩ where they differ from IPA orthography.

Consonants
		Bilabial	Dental	Alveolar	Post- alveolar	Retroflex	Palatal	Velar	Glottal
Plosive	voiceless	p	t̪ ⟨tt⟩	t			c ⟨tj⟩	k	ʔ ⟨'⟩
Plosive	voiced	b	d̪ ⟨dd⟩	d			ɟ ⟨dj⟩	g	
Fricative	voiceless	ɸ ⟨f⟩	θ ⟨th⟩		ʃ ⟨sh⟩			x ⟨h⟩	
Fricative	voiced	β ⟨v⟩	ð ⟨dh⟩						
Nasal	voiced	m	n̪ ⟨nh⟩	n			ɲ ⟨ny⟩	ŋ ⟨ng⟩	
Nasal	prestopped	^{p}m ⟨pm⟩	^{t̪}n̪ ⟨ttnh⟩	^{t}n ⟨tn⟩				^{g}ŋ ⟨gng⟩	
Nasal	voiceless							^{k}ŋ ⟨kng⟩	
Semivowel							j ⟨y⟩	w	
Lateral			l̪ ⟨lh⟩	l		ɭ ⟨rl⟩	ʎ ⟨ly⟩		
Trill	voiceless			r̥ ⟨rh⟩					
Trill	voiced			r ⟨rr⟩					
Flap						ɽ ⟨r⟩			

== Morphology ==
Morrobolam is an ergative–absolutive language.

=== Nouns and Pronouns ===
Personal pronouns have two cases: nominative for intransitive and transitive subjects, and accusative for transitive objects. Nouns have an ergative case for transitive subject function and an absolutive case for intransitive subject and transitive object function. There are a total of at least 10 noun cases, and the case-marking suffix is dependent on the final consonant in the root word. The absolutive case is the only case suffix that is not final consonant-dependent, and has a zero as a suffix.

atha-Ø la-ngan
fire-ABS burn-3sgO
"The fire is burning now."

Pronouns are attached to the end of the verb as a suffix, either as nominal or possessive.
