= Koko-Bera language =

Australian Aboriginal language

Gugubera
- Koko Pera
- Kok-Kaper
- Native to: Australia
- Region: Cape York Peninsula, Queensland
- Ethnicity: Kokopera
- Native speakers: 18 (2021 census)
- Language family: Pama–Nyungan: Paman; Southwestern; Coastal; Koko Pera; Gugubera
- Dialects: Koko Bera (Kok Kaber); Kok Peponk (Koko Babangk); Kok Wap?; Koko Beberam

Language codes
- ISO 639-3: Either: kkp – Gugubera okg – Koko Babangk
- Glottolog: gugu1254
- AIATSIS: Y85 Kok-Kaper, Y203 Kok-Paponk, Y204 Koko Beberam, Y209 Kok Wap
- ELP: Koko-Bera
- Koko Babangk
- Koko-Bera is classified as Severely Endangered by the UNESCO Atlas of the World's Languages in Danger.

Gugubera (Koko Pera), or Kok-Kaper, is a Paman language of the Cape York Peninsula, Queensland, in Australia.

== Phonology ==
=== Consonants ===
	Peripheral		Laminal		Apical	
	Labial	Velar	Dental	Palatal	Alveolar	Retroflex
Plosive	p	k	t̪	c	t	
Nasal	m	ŋ	n̪	ɲ	n	
Rhotic					ɾ ~ r	
Lateral					l	
Approximant	w			j		ɻ

=== Vowels ===
	Front	Central	Back
High	i		u
Mid	e	ə	o
Low		a	
