= Percy Trezise =

Australian artist (1923–2005)

Percy Trezise AM (28 January 1923 – 11 May 2005) was an Australian pilot, painter, explorer and writer as well as, notably, a "discoverer", documenter, and historian of Aboriginal rock art. He was born in Tallangatta, Victoria but is associated especially with Far North Queensland and the rock art galleries of the Cape York Peninsula.

== Life ==
Trezise was born in Tallangatta (northern Victoria), of Cornish descent, and attended a bush school followed by Albury High School. His interest in Aboriginal peoples began when he won a copy of The Red Centre by Hedley Herbert Finlayson while a student in high school. During World War II, Trezise served in the Royal Australian Air Force, surviving the crash of a Wackett trainer in August 1942. From 1956 he worked in northern Australia as an airline pilot for Ansett and the Cairns Aerial Ambulance. From the air he learned to identify areas likely to contain Aboriginal rock art, which he subsequently explored on foot. During the 1960s, he regularly overflew Dunk Island attempting to locate the Aboriginal galleries mentioned by E. J. Banfield in his Confessions of a Beachcomber (1908) and later walked in to find them based on his aerial observations.

He was a friend of writer Xavier Herbert, artists Ray Crooke and Ron Edwards and a collaborator with Aboriginal artist Dick Roughsey in a series of children's picture books.

He died in Cairns, Queensland.

== Honours ==
In 1996, he was made a member of the Order of Australia. In 2004, he received an Honorary Doctorate of Letters from James Cook University, in recognition of outstanding service to the community of far north Queensland. An episode of Australian Story, "Set In Stone" (2014), was dedicated to Percy Trezise. Introduced by Australian of the Year, Adam Goodes, it focuses on Trezise's 50 year relation with Quinkan rock art that continues with his sons.

== Bibliography ==
Books authored or illustrated by Trezise include:

- 1969 - Quinkan Country. Adventures in search of aboriginal cave paintings in Cape York. (With Dick Roughsey). Reed Australia.
- 1971 - Rock Art of South-East Cape York. Monograph. Australian Institute of Aboriginal Studies, Canberra.
- 1973 – Last Days of a Wilderness. Collins: Sydney.
- 1986 - Ngalculli the Red Kangaroo.
- 1987 - Platypus and Kookaburra. (Written by Rex Ingamellis and illustrated by Percy Trezise and Mary Haginikita).
- 1991 - Mungoon-Gali, the Giant Goanna. Angus & Robertson: Sydney. ISBN 0-207-17200-5
- 1993 – Dream Road: A Journey of Discovery. Allen & Unwin:

Percy Tresize made a video on his 75th birthday in which he talks about his life and Dick Roughsey. This is one of the last known video interviews where he discusses the importance of Indigenous Australian culture and how he was drawn to rock art from his early days as a bush pilot with the flying doctor service.
