= Dick Roughsey =

Australian artist and writer

- Goobalathaldin
- Born: c. 1920; Langu-narnji Island, North Wellesley Islands, Queensland, Australia
- Died: 1985
- Occupations: Artist; Illustrator; Writer
- Known for: Children's picture books based on Aboriginal stories
- Notable work: The Rainbow Serpent; The Quinkins
- Awards: Officer of the Order of the British Empire (1978)

Dick Roughsey (c. 1920 – 1985) was an Australian Aboriginal artist from the Lardil language group on Mornington Island in the south-eastern Gulf of Carpentaria, Queensland. His tribal name was Goobalathaldin, meaning “the ocean, dancing”, describing a “rough sea”. He was an active and prominent figure involved in reviving and preserving the cultural life of the Lardil people. His best known works are a series of children's picture books that retell traditional Aboriginal stories including “The Rainbow Serpent”.

== Early life ==
Dick was born about 1920 on Langu-narnji Island, joined to Mornington Island by a sandbank at low tide, and part of the North Wellesley Islands group in the Gulf of Carpentaria. He was given the tribal name Goobalathaldin. His mother, Kuthakin, gave birth to him under a clump of Pandanus palms. His father's name was Kiwarbija. Dick's early memories were of his mother carrying him while she hunted for food. His young life was carefree as he played naked with his brothers. He spent the earliest part of his childhood in the bush living a traditional Indigenous lifestyle learning the ceremonies and dreaming stories of his ancestors. He learnt the rich oral history of the Lardil tribe from his father. His ancestral relatives were three people, Marnbil the leader, his wife Gin-Gin, and her uncle Dewallewul. The activities the ancestors engaged in produced the topography, flora and fauna that exist today.

The white missionaries convinced Dick’s parents to bring him to the Presbyterian mission school on Mornington Island when he was 7 or 8 years old. He was initially scared of his new surroundings but he soon settled in and had a happy but tough Christian education. He was given the name “Dick” at the mission. His father died while he was at the mission school.

Dick enjoyed going back to his family home on holidays. On one of these holidays he caught the eye disease trachoma, which affected his vision and caused problems for him in later life. On these holidays he did his fair share of hunting and fishing. He saw his first small aeroplane – of the Flying Doctor service – while living at the mission school. He left school at about 13 years of age and continued his education with the tribal elders, learning Lardil laws and the ways of hunting. He learnt when to feast and when to dance. He did not undergo ceremonial initiation – normally undertaken around this age – because the missionaries had asked the elders to stop the ceremonies. Dick spoke Lardil language but not Damin language, as he is not initiated.

== Family life ==
Roughsey and his wife, Elsie, had six children together over a period of almost twenty years. His children Mervyn, Raymond, Kevin, Eleanor, Basil and Duncan were raised primarily by their mother on Mornington Island as their father frequently travelled for work. While he was away Elsie sent him lists of things she wished him to purchase and send back to her on Mornington Island. In his absence, Raymond assumed the father figure role and helped his mother to raise the younger children.

The Roughsey children attended school on Thursday Island as Dick believed that an education there would lead to greater employment opportunities on mainland Australia. His brother, Lindsay, also lived on Mornington Island with his family; he too was an artist, regularly sending pieces to Percy Trezise for him to sell. Dick and Lindsay apparently had a troubled relationship.

== Career ==
In about 1940, Roughsey moved to mainland Australia to start paid employment. He worked for a few years in manual jobs such as stockman, deckhand, fisherman, sailor and yardman, before serving in the Second World War.

After his wartime service, Roughsey returned to Mornington Island, where he began family life with wife, Elsie. Roughsey began to show interest in painting and, after meeting Percy Trezise, began to develop a personal style that was salable to a new art market. Roughsey began to work with oil paints and established a body of work that exists today as a record of an emerging contemporary Aboriginal art movement.

Roughsey established himself as a well-respected artist and supporter of cultural heritage projects that protect Indigenous culture. His work with Trezise to record the position of ancient Aboriginal sites and important rock paintings was one of the first of its kind and focused on knowledge within the wider community about respect and preservation. In 1968, with Percy Trezise, he rediscovered the important archaeological site of Hann River, in the central Cape York Peninsula.

Roughsey was involved with the international exhibition program of the Aboriginal Arts Board (AAB). The AAB was responsible for numerous traveling exhibitions to approximately 40 countries along with publications and gifts of Aboriginal works to overseas museums. This stimulated an interest in Aboriginal art. In 1973, Roughsey was appointed inaugural chair of the AAB by then-Prime Minister Gough Whitlam and continued in this position until 1975, however, his involvement with the AAB is documented before and after this period.

== Relationship with Percy Trezise ==
Roughsey met Percy Trezise in 1962 at Karumba Lodge at the mouth of the Norman River. Trezise was a pilot for Ansett Airlines who painted casually and quickly became Roughsey's mentor. Trezise encouraged Roughsey to paint the stories that were part of his country and not to mimic the styles and narratives of the then famous Albert Namatjira. Trezise encouraged Roughsey to develop his personal painting style on bark paintings initially, then move to oil on canvas. Throughout their relationship Trezise regularly supplied Roughsey with art materials often cutting bark himself from around his home in Cairns.

Trezise was an active supporter and promoter of Roughsey's work, staging many exhibitions and showcases of Mornington Island Art throughout Australia. Trezise became an active participant in preserving Lardil customs and stories and he was given the name 'Warrenby' by Roughsey in 1963. Trezise and Roughsey travelled together for many years throughout Australia exploring cave paintings and documenting them for the Australian Institute of Aboriginal Studies.

Trezise and Roughsey collaborated on a series of picture books which retold traditional Aboriginal stories, some of which were among the first books to introduce Aboriginal culture to Australian children.

== Achievements, recognition, and awards ==
Roughsey's passion for the preservation of Indigenous culture and traditions presented him with the opportunity to be appointed to the Aboriginal Advisory Committee for the Australia Council in 1970.

In 1971, he wrote the first autobiography by an Aboriginal author.

In 1973, Roughsey became the Chair of the Aboriginal Arts Board, continuing this role until 1975. He was also a member of the Australian Institute of Aboriginal Studies.

In 1978, he was made Officer of the Order of the British Empire (OBE), for Service to Aboriginal Art and Culture.

His cultural contributions inspired the establishment of the Gooalathaldin Memorial Community Centre, which opened in his honour on Mornington Island in 2003.

He won several literary awards, including:

- Children's Book Council of Australia Book of the Year Award, Picture Book of the Year, 1974: commended for The Giant Devil-Dingo
- FAW Patricia Weickhardt Award to an Aboriginal Writer, 1976 for The Rainbow Serpent
- Children's Book Council of Australia Book of the Year Award, Picture Book of the Year, 1976: winner for The Rainbow Serpent
- Children's Book Council Book of the Year Award, Picture Book of the Year, 1979: winner for The Quinkins
- IBBY (International Board on Books for Young People) Honour Diploma, Illustration, 1980 for The Quinkins
- Children's Book Council Book of the Year Award, Picture Book of the Year, 1983: commended for Turramulli the Giant Quinkin

== Published works ==
=== Autobiographical ===
- 1971 – Moon and Rainbow: The Autobiography of an Aboriginal. Reed: Sydney. ISBN 0-589-00665-7
- 1989 – ‘School Days’, in North of Capricorn: An Anthology of Prose. (Eds: Des Petersen & Stephen Torre). Foundation for Australian Literary Studies, JCU: Townsville. ISBN 0-86443-298-4
- 1990 – ‘Gidegal the Moon-Man’, in The Macmillan Anthology of Australian Literature. (Ed: Ken Goodwin). Palgrave Macmillan. ISBN 0-333-50158-6

=== Poetry and prose ===
- 1980 – ‘In The Old Days’, in Australian Dreaming: 40,000 Years of Aboriginal History. (Ed. and comp. Jennifer Isaacs). Lansdowne Press: Sydney. ISBN 0-7018-1330-X
- 1980 – ‘Gidegal the Moon-Man’, in Australian Dreaming: 40,000 Years of Aboriginal History. (Ed. and comp. Jennifer Isaacs). Lansdowne Press: Sydney. ISBN 0-7018-1330-X

=== Children’s illustrated books ===
- 1973 – The Giant Devil Dingo. Collins: London. ISBN 0-00-185002-4
- 1975 – The Rainbow Serpent. Collins: Sydney. ISBN 0-207-17433-4
- 1978 – The Quinkins. (With Percy Trezise). Collins: Sydney. ISBN 0-00-184370-2
- 1978 – The Turkey and the Emu. Harcourt Brace: Sydney.
- 1980 – Banana Bird and the Snake Men. (With Percy Trezise). Collins: Sydney. ISBN 0-00-184334-6
- 1982 – Turramulli the Giant Quinkin. (With Percy Trezise). Angus & Robertson: Sydney. ISBN 0-00-661942-8
- 1983 – The Magic Firesticks. (With Percy Trezise). Collins: Sydney. ISBN 0-00-662038-8
- 1984 – Gidja the Moon. (With Percy Trezise). Collins: Sydney. ISBN 0-207-16729-X
- 1985 – The Flying Fox Warriors. (With Percy Trezise). Collins: Sydney. ISBN 0-00-184353-2

== See also ==
- Mornington Island Art
- Sally Gabori
