= Tagalog =

Tagalog may refer to:

== Language ==
- Tagalog language, a language spoken in the Philippines
  - Old Tagalog, an archaic form of the language
  - Batangas Tagalog, a dialect of the language
- Tagalog script, the writing system historically used for Tagalog, also known as Baybayin
  - Tagalog (Unicode block), character encodings for computers

== Other ==
- Tagalog people, a major ethnic group in the Philippines
- Southern Tagalog, a region in southern Luzon that is the heartland of the Tagalog people
- Tagalog Republic or Katagalugan, revolutionary governments during the Philippine Revolution
- Tagalog War, another name for the Philippine Revolution
- Tagalog Insurgency, another name for the Philippine–American War
- Tagalog (beetle), a genus of beetles in the subfamily Prioninae
