= Wik Iyanh =

Indigenous Australian tribe

The Wikianji (Wik Iyanh) were an indigenous Australian tribe of the Cape York Peninsula of northern Queensland.

== Country ==
Their territory embraced an area of some 600 square miles (1,600 km^{2}) around the middle section of the Holroyd River.

== Social structure ==
The Wikianji were a relatively small tribe, believed to be related to the Wik-Mungkan from whom they may have at the time of early colonial exploration just splintered off, and in the process of becoming a separate tribe.

== Alternative names ==
- Wikianyi
- Wik-Iyena

== Sources ==
- McConnel, Ursula H. (September 1939). "Social Organization of the Tribes of Cape York Peninsula, North Queensland". Oceania. 10 (1): 54–72. doi:10.1002/j.1834-4461.1939.tb00256.x. JSTOR 40327744.
- McConnel, Ursula H. (June 1940). "Social Organization of the Tribes of Cape York Peninsula, North Queensland (Continued)". Oceania. 10 (4): 434–455. doi:10.1002/j.1834-4461.1940.tb00305.x. JSTOR 40327867.
- Sutton, Peter (1979). Wik: Aboriginal society, territory and language at Cape Keerweer, Cape York Peninsula, Australia (PDF) (PhD thesis). University of Queensland.
- Tindale, Norman Barnett (1974). "Wikianji (QLD)". Aboriginal Tribes of Australia: Their Terrain, Environmental Controls, Distribution, Limits, and Proper Names. Australian National University Press. ISBN 978-0-708-10741-6.
