= Southwestern Paman languages =

Family of Australian Aboriginal languages

Southwest Pama
- Geographic distribution: Cape York Peninsula, Queensland
- Linguistic classification: Pama–Nyungan: Paman; Southwest Pama
- Subdivisions: Upper; Coastal

Language codes
- Glottolog: sout3141
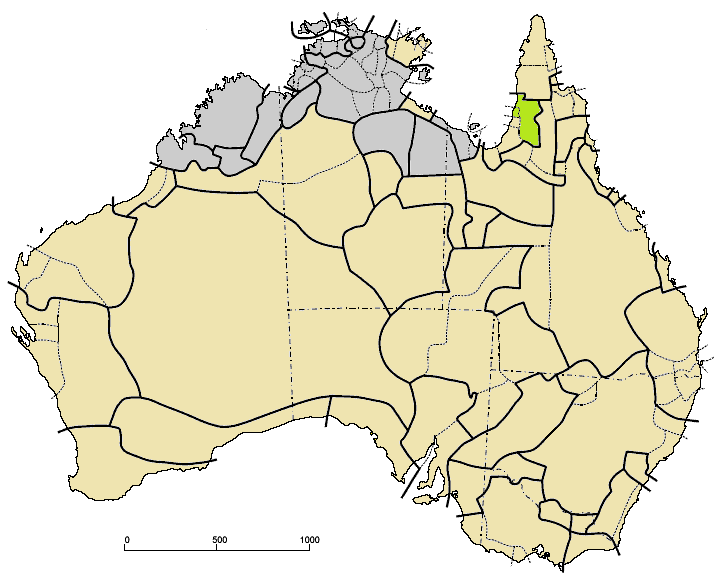
- Southwestern Paman languages (green) among other Pama–Nyungan (tan)

The Southwestern Paman languages are a family of the Paman languages spoken on the western part of the Cape York Peninsula of Queensland, Australia.

Alpher (1972) accepts Southwestern Pama as a valid node; the classification below is his. R. M. W. Dixon, on the other hand, only accepts a connections between pairs of languages: Yir, as two dialects of a single language, and Koko Bera with Kok Thawa.

- Southwestern Paman
  - Upper Southwest Pama
    - Kuuk Thaayorre
    - Kuuk Yak
      - Kunjen (Oykangand)
      - Ogh-Undjan (Kawarrangg)
  - Coastal Southwest Pama
    - Yir-Yoront (Yirrk-Thangalkl)
    - Koko Pera
      - Koko-Bera
      - Kok Thawa

Bowern (2011) also lists the extinct Kokiny and Kok-Papángk.
