= Kunjen language =

Paman language spoken in Queensland, Australia

Kunjen
- Uw
- Native to: Australia
- Region: Cape York Peninsula, Queensland
- Ethnicity: Ngundjan (Ogh-Undjan), Uw Oykangand, Olkola
- Native speakers: 2 (2005)
- Language family: Pama–Nyungan: Paman; Southwestern; Upper; Kunjen
- Dialects: Uw Oykangand; Uw Olkola; Ogh-Undjan; Kawarrang; Athina

Language codes
- ISO 639-3: Either: kjn – Oykangand olk – Olkol
- Glottolog: kunj1248
- AIATSIS: Y83 Kunjen (cover term), Y188 Kokiny, Y237 Athina
- ELP: Kunjen; Olkol
- Kunjen is classified as Critically Endangered by the UNESCO Atlas of the World's Languages in Danger.

Kunjen, or Uw, is a Paman language spoken on the Cape York Peninsula of Queensland, Australia, by the Uw Oykangand, Olkola, and related Aboriginal Australian peoples. It is closely related to Kuuk Thaayorre, and perhaps Kuuk Yak.

== Dialects ==
Two of its dialects, Uw Olkola (Olgolo) and Uw Oykangand (Koko Wanggara), are very close, being mutually intelligible and sharing 97% of their core vocabulary. Another two, Ogh-Undjan and Kawarrangg, are also close, but somewhat more distant from the first pair. Kokinj (Kokiny) is a subdialect of Ogh-Undjan. A fifth variety, Athima, is poorly attested.

Below is a table showing the mutual intelligibility in vocabulary between the Kunjen dialects, based on a list of 100 basic words.

| Uw Oykangand | 97% | 44% | 38% |
| Uw Olkola | | 43% | 38% |
| Ogh-Undjan | | | 82% |
Kawarrangg

A small dictionary of Kunjen has been compiled by Philip Hamilton. A great majority of words begin with a vowel (>96%), similar to the situation in distantly-related Arrernte. Exceptions include kinship terms and loanwords. Syllable onsets are thought to be present in all languages, so their absence in native lexicon is highly notable.

== Respect register ==
As in many other Australian languages, such as Dyirbal, Kunjen also has a respect register, which is a polite way of speaking with a potential mother-in-law and is called Olkel-Ilmbanhthi. Most of the vocabulary is replaced, while affixes and function words are kept.

Alka-nhdh idu-rr ay
spear-INSTR spear-PST I
"I speared it with a spear."

Udnga-nhdh yanganyunyja-rr ay
spear-INSTR spear-PST I
"I speared it with a spear."

== Phonology ==
=== Vowels ===
Kunjen has 5 vowels:

Vowels
| | Front | Back |
| | Unrounded | Rounded |
|---|---|---|
| Close | i | u |
| Mid | e | o |
| Open | a | |

There is a lexical vowel harmony constraint in Kunjen: Close and mid vowels do not co-occur in a word.

=== Consonants ===
Kunjen has 27 consonants:

Consonants
| | | Peripheral | | Laminal | | Apical | |
| | | Bilabial | Velar | Palatal | Dental | Alveolar | Retroflex |
|---|---|---|---|---|---|---|---|
| Plosive | voiceless | p ⟨p⟩ | k ⟨k⟩ | c ⟨ch⟩ | t̪ ⟨th⟩ | t ⟨t⟩ | |
| Plosive | voiced | b ⟨b⟩ | g ⟨g⟩ | ɟ ⟨j⟩ | d̪ ⟨dh⟩ | d ⟨d⟩ | |
| Nasal | plain | m ⟨m⟩ | ŋ ⟨ng⟩ | ɲ ⟨ny⟩ | n̪ ⟨nh⟩ | n ⟨n⟩ | |
| Nasal | prestopped | ᵇm ⟨bm⟩ | ᶢŋ ⟨gng⟩ | ᶡɲ ⟨jny⟩ | ᵈ̪n̪ ⟨dnh⟩ | ᵈn ⟨dn⟩ | |
| Fricative | | f ⟨f⟩ | ɣ ⟨ɣ⟩ | | ð ⟨ð⟩ | | |
| Trill | | | | | | r ⟨rr⟩ | |
| Approximant | Central | w ⟨w⟩ | | j ⟨y⟩ | | | ɻ ⟨r⟩ |
| Approximant | Lateral | | | ʎ ⟨ly⟩ | l̪ ⟨lh⟩ | l ⟨l⟩ | |

== In popular culture ==
The Uw Olkola word for the freshwater crocodile, ogakor, was used as the name of a tribe on the second season of the American reality television series Survivor in 2001.
