= Ikarranggal language =

Australian Aboriginal language

Ikarranggal
- Gogo Mini
- Ogh Ikarranggal
- Native to: Australia
- Region: Cape York Peninsula, Queensland
- Extinct: (date missing)
- Language family: Pama–Nyungan: Paman; Thaypan; Ikarranggal

Language codes
- ISO 639-3: ikr
- Glottolog: ikar1243
- AIATSIS: Y198
- ELP: Ikaranggal

The Ikarranggal language, or Ogh Ikarranggal (Ikaranggal, Ikarranggali), is an extinct Paman language of the Cape York Peninsula in Queensland, Australia. Like several languages in the area, it is often referred to as Gogo Mini (Kuku-Mini) 'good speech'.
