= Lama Lama people =

Aboriginal Australian people

The Lama Lama, also spelt Lamalama, are a contemporary Aboriginal Australian people of the eastern Cape York Peninsula in northern Queensland. The term was formerly used as one of the ethnonyms associated with a distinct tribe or clan group, the Bakanambia. They are today an aggregation of remnants of several former tribes or clan groups.

== Languages ==
The Lamalama were constituted from several distinct language groups, speaking respectively Umpithamu, Morrobalama (Umbuygamu), Mba Rumbathama (Lamalama) and Rimanggudinhma.

== History ==
The Lama Lama people arose out of the fusion of roughly 40 patrician clans and something like five distinct language groups and an as yet unknown number of local people, to form a distinct group in their own right, exercising a collective land right based on their diverse heritage of land ownership. They now consist of more than a dozen cognatic descent groups.

== Notable people ==
- Barry Port, Australia's last Aboriginal tracker employed solely for the role, died 2020.

== See also ==
- Lama Lama National Park

== Sources ==
- Rigsby, Bruce; Chase, Athol (2014). "The Sandbeach People and Dugong hunters of Eastern Cape York Peninsula: property in land and sea country". In Peterson, Nicolas; Rigsby, Bruce (eds.). Customary marine tenure in Australia. Sydney University Press. pp. 307–350. ISBN 978-1-743-32389-2. (Available online at Sydney University Library as PDF.)
- Sexton-McGrath, Kristy (6 March 2020). "Last Aboriginal police tracker and Cape York legend dies". ABC News.
- Tindale, Norman Barnett (1974). "Bakanambia (QLD)". Aboriginal Tribes of Australia: Their Terrain, Environmental Controls, Distribution, Limits, and Proper Names. Australian National University Press. ISBN 978-0-708-10741-6.
- Verstraete, Jean-Christophe; De Cock, Barbara (April 2008). "Construing Confrontation: Grammar in the Construction of a Key Historical Narrative in Umpithamu". Language in Society. 37 (2): 217–240. doi:10.1017/s0047404508080275. JSTOR 20108123. S2CID 144744258.
