= Lamalama language =

Australian Aboriginal language

Lamalama
- Mbarrumbathama, Mba Rumbathama
- Native to: Australia
- Region: Queensland
- Ethnicity: Lamalama
- Native speakers: 3 (2016 census)
- Language family: Pama–Nyungan: Paman; Lamalamic; Lamalama

Language codes
- ISO 639-3: lby
- Glottolog: lamu1254
- AIATSIS: Y136
- ELP: Lamalama

The Lamalama language, also known by the clan name Mbarrumbathama (Austlang) or Mba Rumbathama, formerly known as Lamu-Lamu or Lama-Lama, is a Paman language of Queensland, Australia. Lamalama is one of four languages once spoken by the Lamalama people, the others being Morrobolam (Umbuygamu), Mbariman-Gudinhma, and Umpithamu.

== Naming and language relationships ==
In January 2019, the ISO database changed its reference name to Lamalama, from Lamu-Lamu. As of August 2020, Glottolog calls it Lamalama, while AIATSIS' Austlang database thesaurus heading is Mbarrumbathama language.

Austlang says, quoting linguist Jean-Cristophe Verstraete (2018), that Lamalama, Rimanggudinhma (Mbariman-Gudhinma) and Morrobolam form a genetic subgroup of Paman known as Lamalamic, "defined by shared innovations in phonology and morphology". Within this subgroup, "Morrobolam and Lamalama form a phonologically innovative branch, while Rumanggudinhma forms a more conservative branch".

== Phonology ==
=== Consonants ===
Consonants
		Labial	Dental	Alveolar	Palatal	Velar	Glottal
Plosive	voiceless	p	t̪	t	c	k	ʔ
Plosive	voiced	b	d̪	d	ɟ		
Plosive	prenasal	ᵐb	ⁿ̪d̪	ⁿd	ᶮɟ	ᵑɡ	
Nasal		m	n̪	n	ɲ	ŋ	
Fricative		ɸ	θ	r̝	ɕ		h
Lateral				l			
Rhotic				r			
Approximant		w		ɹ	j		

- Voiceless fricative sounds /ɸ, θ, ɕ, h/ are heard as voiced [β, ð, ʑ, ɦ] when in consonant clusters and in intervocalic positions.
- Fricatives /θ, ɕ/ can be heard as laminal and alveolar fricatives [s̻, s] when in word-initial position in free variation among speakers.
- /h/ can be heard as [x] when in word-initial position in free variation among speakers.
- The fricative trill /r̝/ is also heard as voiceless [r̝̥] in free variation in initial positions.
- The trill sound /r/ can be heard as voiceless [r̥] when in word-final contexts.
- All labial consonants can also be labialized optionally within the onset of stressed syllables, or when after high-back vowel sounds.
- Consonant lengthening [Cː] can be heard within the onset of stressed syllables.

=== Vowels ===
Vowels
	Front	Central	Back
Close	i		u
Open	a		

Vowel allophones
Phoneme	Allophone	Notes
/i/	[ɪ]	in unstressed syllables
/i/	[ɨ]	in stressed syllables
/i/	[ʉ], [ɵ]	when following labial consonants
/a/	[ɐ]	in free variation with [a]
/a/	[ə]	in unstressed syllables
/a/	[æ]	when in the context of palatal sounds
/a/	[ɛ]	realized within the diphthong /ia/
/a/	[ɔ]	realized within the diphthong /ua/
/u/	[ʊ]	in unstressed positions

Lamalama's vowels do not show contrastive length. There are two diphthongs, /ia/ and /ua/. /ia/ can raise to [iɛ], and /ua/ can raise to [uɔ].
