= Paman languages =

Australian Aboriginal language family

Paman
- Geographic distribution: Cape York Peninsula, Queensland
- Linguistic classification: Pama–Nyungan: Paman

Language codes
- Glottolog: pama1251
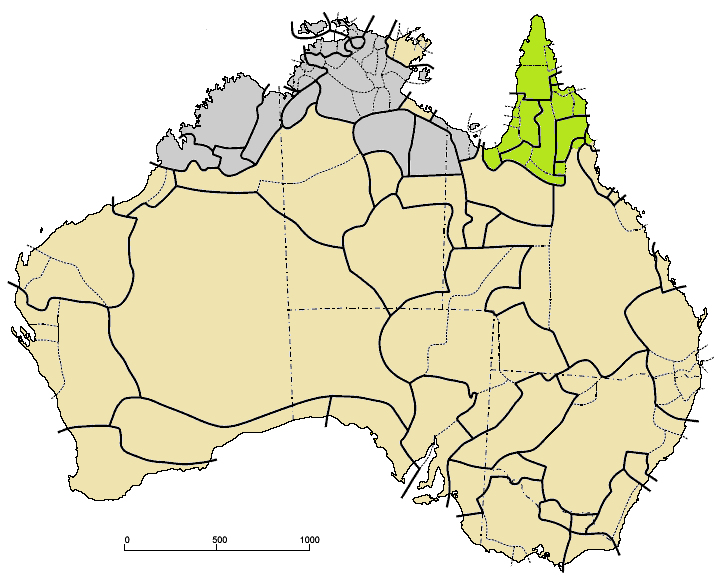
- Paman languages (green) among other Pama–Nyungan (tan)

The Paman languages are an Australian language family spoken on Cape York Peninsula, Queensland. First noted by Kenneth Hale, Paman is noteworthy for the profound phonological changes which have affected some of its descendants.

== Classification ==
Various classifications of the Paman languages exist. The one outlined below is that of R. M. W. Dixon, though he does not accept that these branches are necessarily related to each other.

Geographically, running down the east coast, they are:

- North Cape York
  - Northern Paman
  - Umpila
- Umbindhamu †
- Lamalamic
  - Umbuygamu †
  - Lamu-Lamu
- Yalgawarra †
- Yalanjic
  - Guugu Yimithirr
  - Guugu Yalandji
  - Barrow Point † (>> Wik?)
- Mbariman-Gudhinma †
- Djabugay †

Down the west coast, they are:

- North Cape York
  - Northern Paman
  - Wik
- Southwestern
  - Upper Southwest Paman
    - Kuuk Thaayorre
    - Kuuk Yak †
    - Kunjen (incl. Ogh Undjan)
  - Yir-Yoront (incl. Yirrk-Thangalkl) †
  - Koko-Bera (incl. Gugu Dhaw)
- Kok-Nar †
- Norman Paman
  - Kurtjar
  - Kuthant †
- Gugadj †

In the interior, south of Wik, they are:

- Thaypan
  - Gugu Thaypan (?Rarmul) †
  - Aghu Tharrnggala †
  - Ikarranggal-Alungul-Angkula
    - Ikarranggal †
    - Alungul †
    - Angkula †
  - Takalak †
- Southern
  - Agwamin †
  - Mbabaram †
  - Mbara †
  - Walangama †

The name Gugu Mini means 'good speech', and has been applied to several languages in the Thaypan area. 'Possum language' (Koko-Possum, Gugu Yawa) is another generic name of this area.

The unclassified Marrett River language (†) was presumably Paman, though distinct from its neighbors, as presumably was Wik Paach (†). The Mayabic languages (†) to the southwest were once classified as Paman, but have been excluded in Bowern (2011). Alodja may have been another Thaypan / Rarmul Pama language.

== See also ==
- Pama–Maran languages
