= Kuuk Thaayorre language =

Australian Aboriginal language

Kuuk Thaayorre
- Native to: Australia
- Region: Cape York Peninsula, Queensland
- Ethnicity: Thaayorre
- Native speakers: 174 (2021 census)
- Language family: Pama–Nyungan: Paman; Southwestern; Upper; Kuuk Thaayorre
- Dialects: Kuuk Thaayorre; Kuuk Kirka; Kuuk Thayem; Kuuk Thayunth

Language codes
- ISO 639-3: thd
- Glottolog: thay1249
- AIATSIS: Y69
- ELP: Kuuk Thaayorre
- Kuuk Thaayorre is classified as Definitely Endangered by the UNESCO Atlas of the World's Languages in Danger.

Kuuk Thaayorre (Thayore) is a Paman language spoken in the settlement Pormpuraaw on the western part of the Cape York Peninsula, Queensland in Australia by the Thaayorre people. As of 2006, 250 of the 350 ethnic Thaayorre spoke the language. It is in a robust position compared to many indigenous Australian languages, as it is still being acquired by children and used in daily interaction.

It is closely related to the Ogh-Undjan and more distantly related to the Uw languages, Uw Olkola. Kuuk Yak is either a dialect or closely related.

Speakers of the Kuuk Thaayorre language are able to recall the names of a couple of dialects, such as Kuuk Thaayunth, Kuuk Thayem and Kuuk Thanon, but today there is only little dialectal difference and the language has become more uniform as the number of speakers has gone down. The so-called Kuuk Yak language may be a dialect of Kuuk Thaayorre, but may be a closely related language as well. Barry Alpher is currently trying to document the language in order to understand its genetic affiliation.

== Names ==
As with many other Australian languages, there is a long list of alternative spellings of Kuuk Thaayorre. The name itself, Kuuk Thaayorre, means 'the Thaayorre language' in the language itself, kuuk meaning 'language' and Thaayorre being their ethnonym.

Other names include Kuuk Thaayoore, Kuktayor, Kukudayore, Gugudayor, Koko Daiyuri, Koko Taiyor, Kokkotaijari, Kokotaiyari, Thayorre, Thaayore, Thayore, Tayore, Taior, Taiol, Da:jor and Behran.

== Phonology ==
=== Vowels ===
Kuuk Thaayorre has five vowels:

	Front	Back
	Unrounded	Rounded
Close	i	u
Close-mid	e	o
Open	a	

All of the vowels above have a long counterpart. In addition, one of the rhotics may be syllabic.

=== Consonants ===
Kuuk Thaayorre has 16 consonants:

	Peripheral		Laminal		Apical		Glottal
	Bilabial	Velar	Palatal	Dental	Alveolar	Retroflex	Glottal
Plosive	p ⟨p⟩	k ⟨k⟩	c ⟨c⟩	t̪ ⟨th⟩	t ⟨t⟩		ʔ ⟨'⟩
Nasal	m ⟨m⟩	ŋ ⟨ng⟩	ɲ ⟨ny⟩	n̪ ⟨nh⟩	n ⟨n⟩		
Trill					r ⟨rr⟩		
Approximant	w ⟨w⟩		j ⟨y⟩		l ⟨l⟩	ɻ ⟨r⟩	

The maximal syllable structure is CVCCC, and four-consonant clusters are not uncommon. Unusually, sequences of consecutive /r/ and /ɻ/ are valid.

Unlike in many Australian languages, monosyllables of all word classes are frequent in Kuuk Thaayorre.

== Morphosyntax ==
A clause in Kuuk Thaayorre can be as small as a single predicate constituent. Any arguments that a predicate subcategorises for can be omitted. Predicating constituents include verbs, adjectives, nouns, demonstrative pronouns, and locative adverbs.

Kuuk Thaayorre is on the whole a nonconfigurational language at the level of the clause, although for complex clauses there are constraints on the ordering of the main clause and the dependent clause. Within a clause noun phrases have intricate structure.

The irregular form of the ergative morpheme makes it a clear suffix, rather than an enclitic; however, it is borne on the last nominal in the noun phrase. This makes Kuuk Thaayorre an example of a language displaying affixation to phrases. Ergative marking has the pragmatic function of displaying the degree of expectedness of the subject.

There are multiple inclusory constructions, i.e. those referring to a superset while simultaneously focussing on a subset (these are found in many IE languages, e.g. German Wit Scilling 1.du Sc. "Sc. and I"). One of these is a set of single-word inclusory pronouns encoding both superset and subset.

== Lexical semantics ==
Kuuk Thaayorre is similar to most Australian languages for its thoroughgoing use of absolute cardinal directions instead of words with relative senses (ahead, left, etc.) as is familiar in European languages. There are sixteen words for directions in Kuuk Thaayorre. Speakers of Kuuk Thaayorre show a correspondingly greater skill in navigational ability than speakers of languages like English, and always know the exact direction of their facing. When asked to arrange a sequence of pictures in temporal order, speakers consistently arrange them so that time runs east to west, regardless of their own bodily orientation. They are also able to point to cardinal directions with very high accuracy. This has been used to support the Sapir–Whorf hypothesis.
