= Alungul language =

Australian Aboriginal language

Alungul
- Ogh Alungul
- Native to: Australia
- Region: Cape York Peninsula, Queensland
- Extinct: (date missing)
- Language family: Pama–Nyungan: Paman; Thaypan; Alungul

Language codes
- ISO 639-3: None (mis)
- Glottolog: None
- AIATSIS: Y199

The Alungul language, Ogh Alungul (Alngula), is an extinct Paman language of the Cape York Peninsula in Queensland, Australia.
