= Tagalaka language =

Australian Aboriginal language

Takalak
- Tagalag, Tagalaka, Dagalag
- Region: Queensland
- Ethnicity: Tagalag
- Extinct: (date missing)
- Language family: Pama–Nyungan: Paman; Thaypan?; Takalak
- Writing system: Latin

Language codes
- ISO 639-3: tgz
- Glottolog: taga1279
- AIATSIS: Y125
- ELP: Tagalaka

Takalak, also known as Tagalag, Tagalaka or Dagalag is a poorly attested, extinct Australian Aboriginal language of Queensland.

== Country ==
The Tagalaka inhabited the area, estimated at 3,900 square miles (10,000 km^{2}), in the middle of the Gilbert River, north nearly to the Einasleigh River, south to the Gregory Range, east to Georgetown and Forsayth and west to near Croydon.
