= Kuuk Yak language =

Extinct Paman language of Australia

Kuuk Yak
- Native to: Australia
- Region: Cape York Peninsula, Queensland
- Extinct: (date missing)
- Language family: Pama–Nyungan: Paman; Southwestern; Upper; Kuuk Yak

Language codes
- ISO 639-3: uky
- Glottolog: kuuk1243
- AIATSIS: Y200
- ELP: Kuuk-Yak

Kuuk Yak, or the snake language, if translated literally, is an extinct Paman language which was spoken on the Cape York Peninsula of Queensland, Australia.

Very little is known about the language, but a small number of people in the settlement Pormpuraaw are able to remember bits of the language. Barry Alpher is currently trying to collect all these pieces and fragments of information for his lexicon and grammar of the language, and in order to understand the genetic classification of the language, which had once been thought to perhaps be a dialect of the Kuuk Thaayorre language.
