= Mbariman-Gudhinma language =

Extinct Australian Aboriginal language

Mbariman-Gudhinma
- Gugu Warra
- Wurangung
- Native to: Australia
- Region: Queensland
- Ethnicity: Lamalama, Kokowara = Laia, Yadaneru (Wurangung)
- Extinct: likely by 2003
- Language family: Pama–Nyungan: Mbariman-Gudhinma

Language codes
- ISO 639-3: Either: zmv – Mbariman-Gudhinma wrw – Gugu Warra
- Glottolog: mbar1253 Rimanggudhinma gugu1256 Roth's Gugu Warra
- AIATSIS: Y195 Rimanggudinhma, Y80 Gugu Warra, Y66 Wurangung
- ELP: Mbariman-Gudhinma; Gugu-Warra

Mbariman-Gudhinma (Rimanggudinhma, Rimang-Gudinhma, Parimankutinma), one of several languages labelled Gugu Warra (Kuku-Warra, Kuku-Wara) 'unintelligible speech' as opposed to Gugu Mini 'intelligible speech', is an extinct dialect cluster of Aboriginal Australian languages of the Cape York Peninsula in northern Queensland, Australia. Another one in the group is Wurangung, also known as Yadaneru or Jeteneru.

The dialects were spoken by the Lamalama people.

Austlang says, quoting linguist Jean-Cristophe Verstraete (2018), that Lamalama, Rimanggudinhma (Mbariman-Gudhinma) and Morrobolam form a genetic subgroup of Paman known as Lamalamic, "defined by shared innovations in phonology and morphology". Within this subgroup, "Morrobolam and Lamalama form a phonologically innovative branch, while Rumanggudinhma forms a more conservative branch".

== Phonology ==
=== Consonants ===
		Labial	Dental	Alveolar	Palatal	Velar
Plosive	voiceless	p	t̪	t	c	k
Plosive	voiced	b	d̪	d	ɟ	ɡ
Plosive	prenasal	ᵐb	ⁿ̪d̪	ⁿd	ᶮɟ	ᵑɡ
Nasal		m	n̪	n	ɲ	ŋ
Lateral				l		
Rhotic	voiced			r		
Rhotic	voiceless			r̥		
Approximant		w	ð̞	ɹ	j	

=== Vowels ===
	Front	Central	Back
Close	i	ɨ	u
Mid	ɛ		ɔ
Open		a	
