= Olkolo =

Indigenous Australian people

The Olkolo or Koko-olkola' are an Indigenous Australian people of central and eastern Cape York Peninsula in northern Queensland. According to Norman Tindale, they are to be distinguished from the Kokangol, higher up on the Alice River watershed.

== Language ==
Olkola belongs to the Kunjen branch of the Southwestern Paman languages, as is mutually intelligible with Uw Oykangand, one of the other dialects of that group.

== Country ==
The Olkolo are the traditional owners of some 2,400 square miles (6,200 km^{2}) extending from the Middle Coleman River, as far south as Crosbie River., and including the western margins of the Quinkan region.

== Lifestyle and ecology ==
The Olkolo are one of the Kawadji, or sandbeach people, who harvested the maritime resources available to them as coastal dwellers opposite the Coral Sea. Traditionally, the rhythm of their foraging depended on the climatic changes over two seasons, the dry season that arrived with the south-east trade winds, blowing from April through to November, followed by the northwest monsoon season, beginning in late November/early December. During the dry season, they would occasionally move inland to cull vegetables and timber, but otherwise spent the major part of the year camped on the shores.

== History ==
By 1889, Olkolo people could be found in camps south of their traditional grounds, in the Coen area. One descendant, Willy Long of Laura recalled several decades later a massacre, from which his parents survived, which took place by 40 troopers under Sub-Inspector Urquhart from the Musgrave police station. The ambushed Olkolo fled and sought refuge in swamps, where they were gunned down, in one of 5 such massacres that took place in 1889.

== Alternative names ==
- Koko Olkol, Koko Olkolo, Koko-olkol
- Ol'kol, Olkulo
- Koka-ollugul
- Ulkulu
- Wulgulu
- Olgolo
- Olcoola

== Sources ==
- "AIATSIS map of Indigenous Australia". AIATSIS. 14 May 2024.
- Cole, Noelene (2004). "Battle Camp to Boralga: a local study of colonial war on Cape York Peninsula, 1873-1894". Aboriginal History. 28: 156–189. JSTOR 24046588.
- Cole, Noeline (2016). "Land/People relationships and the Future of Rock Art in the Laura Basin, Northeastern Australia". In Brady, Liam M.; Taçon, Paul S.C. (eds.). Relating to Rock Art in the Contemporary World: Navigating Symbolism, Meaning, and Significance. University Press of Colorado. pp. 107–123. ISBN 978-1-607-32498-0.
- Hale, H. M.; Tindale, N.B. (1933). "Aborigines of Princess Charlotte Bay, North Queensland". Records of the South Australian Museum. 5 (1). Adelaide: 64–116.
- Thomson, Donald F. (1933). "The Hero Cult, Initiation and Totemism on Cape York". Royal Anthropological Institute of Great Britain and Ireland. 63: 453–537. doi:10.2307/2843801. JSTOR 2843801.
- Tindale, Norman Barnett (1974). "Olkolo (QLD)". Aboriginal Tribes of Australia: Their Terrain, Environmental Controls, Distribution, Limits, and Proper Names. Australian National University Press. ISBN 978-0-708-10741-6.
