= Tagalag people =

Aboriginal Australian people

The Tagalag are an Indigenous Australian tribe of Northern Queensland.

== Country ==
The Tagalag tribal lands covered roughly 3,900 square miles (10,000 km^{2}) around the Middle Gilbert River. Tagalaka Country covers various lands in the Gulf Savannah region around the townships of Croydon, Normanton and East Hayden. Their northern extension was close to the Einasleigh River, while the southern boundary was in the vicinity of the Gregory Range. The eastern frontier lay at Georgetown and Forsayth, while their western boundaries were around Croydon.

== Curiosity ==
According to Norman Tindale, a number of the Tagalag have the B blood type which is otherwise quite rare in Australia.

== Alternative names ==
- Dagalang
- Da:galag
- Takalaka
- Targalag
- Tarkalag

== Sources ==
- Tindale, Norman Barnett (1974). "Tagalag (QLD)". Aboriginal Tribes of Australia: Their Terrain, Environmental Controls, Distribution, Limits, and Proper Names. Australian National University.
