= Kokopera =

Indigenous Australian people

The Kokopera, also written Koko Bera, are an indigenous Australian people of the Cape York Peninsula of Northern Queensland.

== Country ==
The Kokopera were a coastal people, ranging about the mouth of the Nassau River with an inland reach of some thirty miles, extending north as far as the Mitchell River, and south traditionally to Inkerman, north of the Staaten River. According to Norman Tindale's calculations, they had some 900 square miles (2,300 km^{2}) of tribal territory.

== Alternative names ==
- Koko-bera
- Kukaberra
- Kungkara
- Konanin (exonym used by neighbouring tribes)
- Goonanin
- Gunani, Gunanni, Goonamin, Goonamon
- Koko papung, Kokopapun
- Ba:bung

== Sources ==
- Tindale, Norman Barnett (1974). "Kokopera (QLD)". Aboriginal Tribes of Australia: Their Terrain, Environmental Controls, Distribution, Limits, and Proper Names. Australian National University Press.
