= Mary Watson (pioneer) =

Australian pioneer and folk heroine

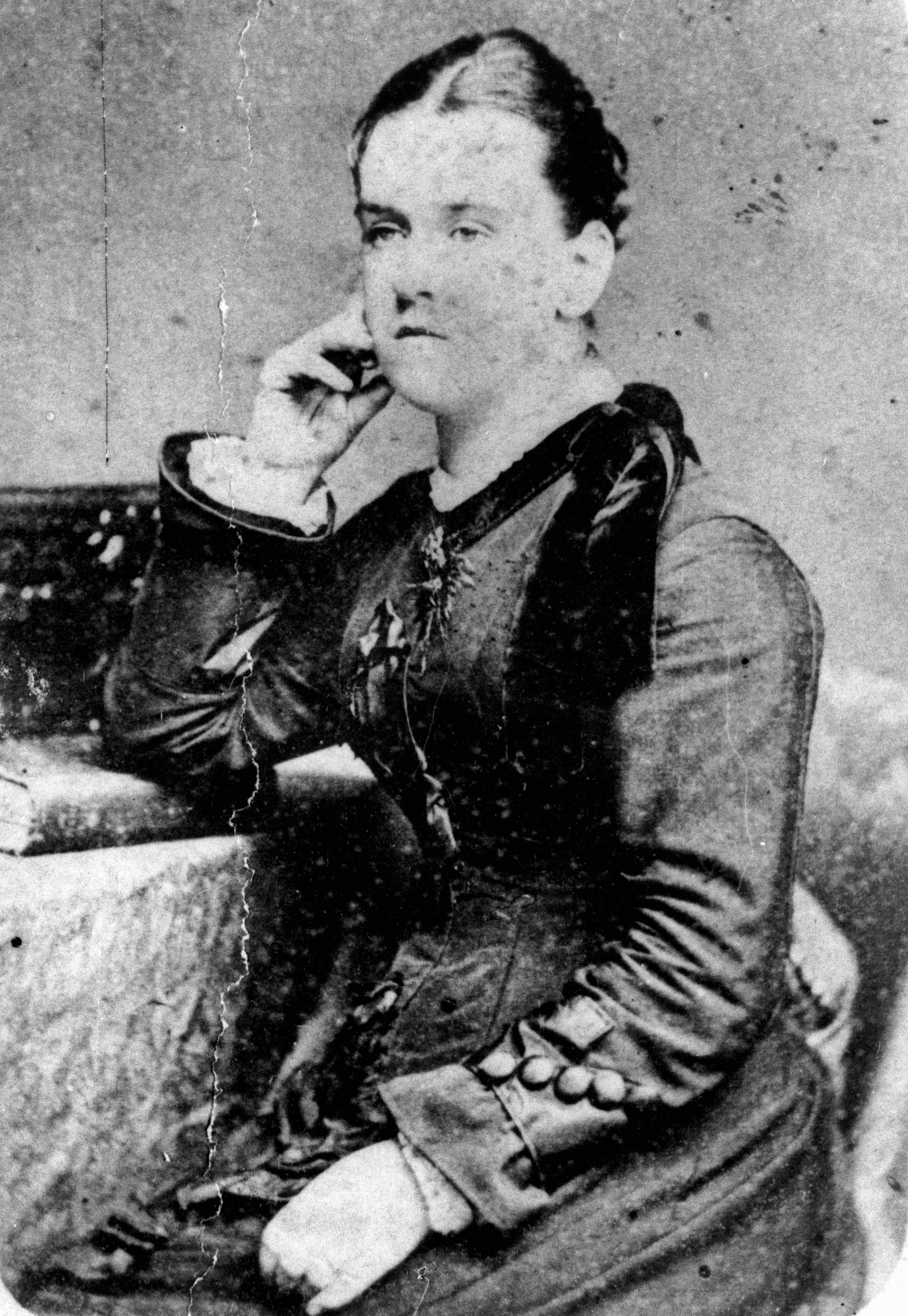
Portrait of Mary Beatrice Watson

Mary Beatrice Watson (17 January 1860 – 1881), was an Australian folk heroine in Queensland. She died aged 21 on a small island of the northern Great Barrier Reef with her son and a servant, after escaping an attack on Lizard Island, where she had settled with her fisherman husband not long before. Watson's story was subsequently retold in numerous newspaper and folk accounts, including heroic poems, usually with little attention given to the Aboriginal and Chinese aspect of the events.

== Early life ==
Mary Watson was born at Fiddler's Green outside St Newlyn East near Truro, Cornwall, England on 17 January 1860. The daughter of Mary Phillips and Thomas Oxnam migrated to the colony of Queensland with her family in 1877. Having accepted a position as a governess with a hotelier's family, at the age of 18 she travelled from Maryborough to the isolated port of Cooktown, where she met and married a bêche de mer fisherman, Captain Robert F. Watson, in May 1880.

== Lizard Island ==
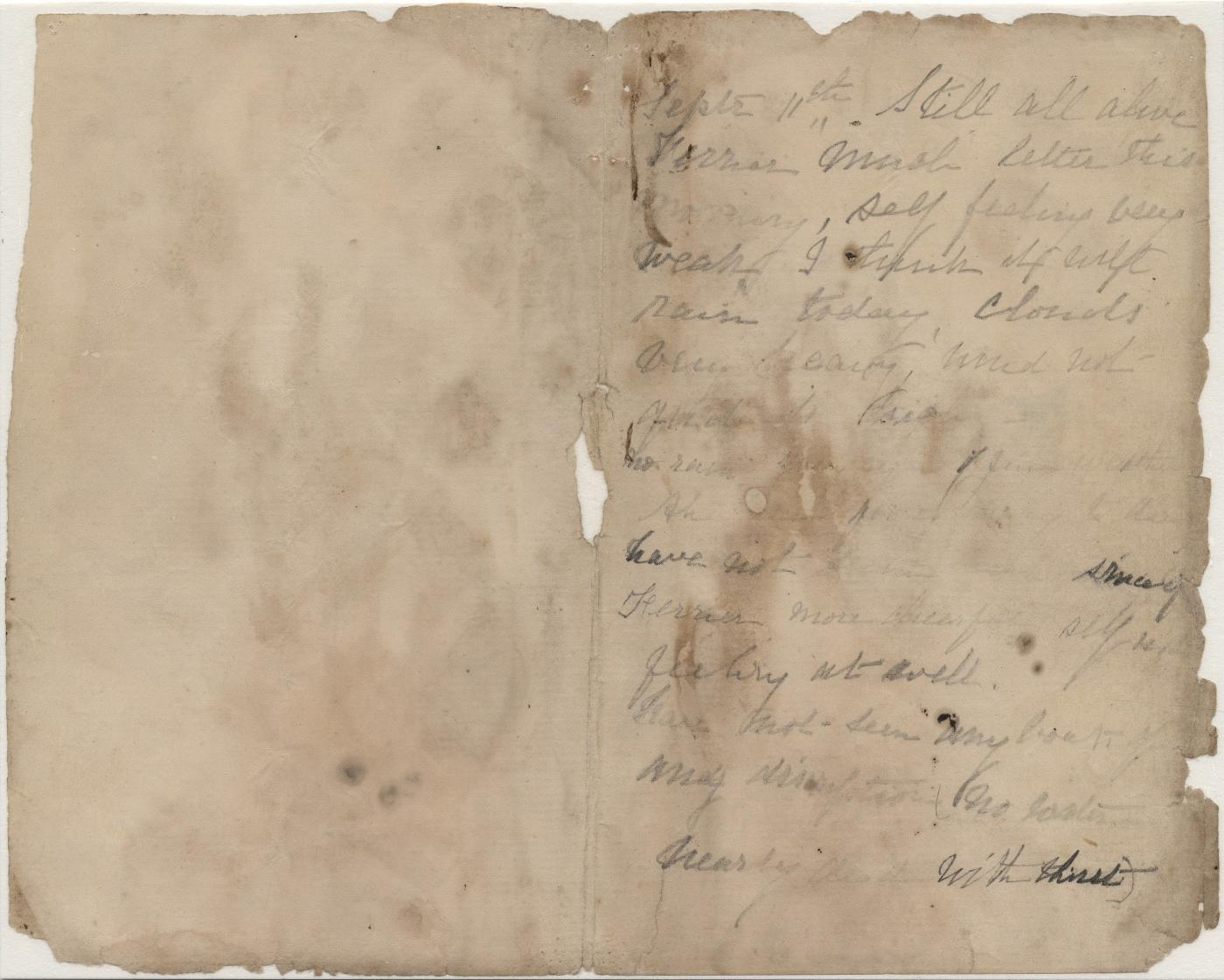
Mary Watson's diary

Robert Watson took her with him to set up a fishing station on Lizard Island, which was otherwise uninhabited. In September 1880, he left Watson, then aged 21, and their four-month old son behind with two Chinese servants known as Ah Sam and Ah Leung, while he and his partner Percy Fuller made an extended fishing trip in their luggers.

She was 21 years old and had been married less than eighteen months when she died of thirst on No. 5 Island in the Howick Group now called Watson’s Island north of Cape Flattery in Far North Queensland, Australia, in 1881. She, with her four-month-old baby, Ferrier, and a wounded Chinese workman, Ah Sam, had drifted for eight days and some forty miles in a cut-down ship's water tank, used for boiling sea slugs, after mainland Aboriginal people had attacked her absent husband's bêche de mer station on Lizard Island. Her diary describing their last days was found with their remains in 1882, and Watson became an emblem of pioneer heroism for many Queenslanders.

=== Attack ===
A few weeks later a party of mainland Aboriginal Guugu Yimithirr (or Dingaal) people made one of their habitual seasonal trips by canoe to the island, where Robert Watson had set up his household in a stone structure close to a small creek, the island's only supply of fresh water. Watson had probably also inadvertently trespassed on an Indigenous ceremonial ground normally taboo to women and children. They may have gone to investigate smoke on the island, which was sacred to them. The Aboriginal people attacked Ah Sam, who suffered seven spear wounds, and Ah Leung was killed in a vegetable garden he was tending. Watson frightened off the group by firing a shotgun and then, with a small supply of food and water, put to sea in the iron sea cucumber tank, hoping to be picked up by a passing vessel. The party drifted from 2 to 7 October, occasionally landing on reefs and islets. Her final diary entry ended "No water. Near dead with thirst". (Note: Her final diary entry mistakenly dated September 11 instead of October 10.)

=== Remains found ===
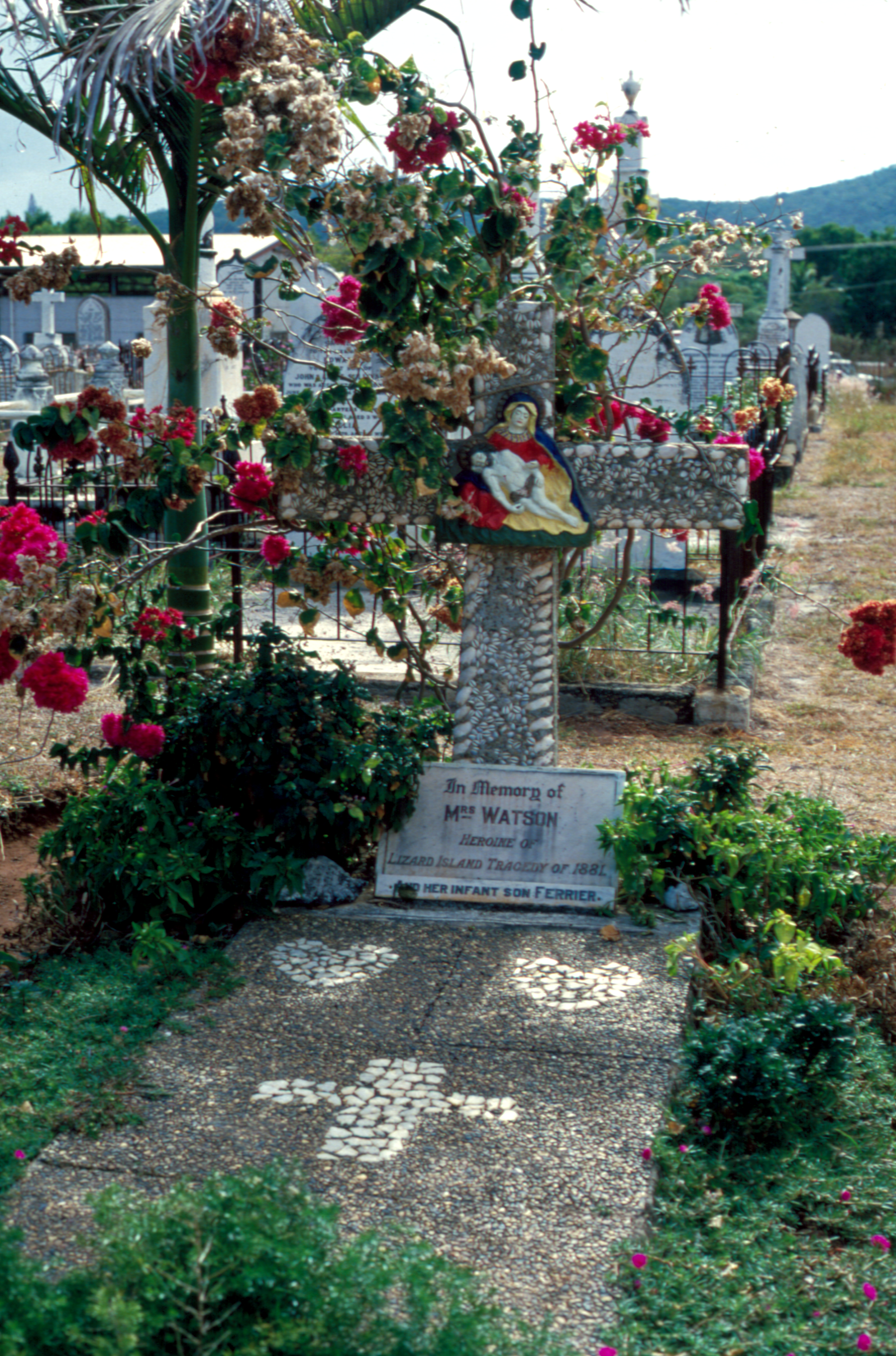
Grave of Mrs Watson at the Cooktown Cemetery, 1986

The remains of Watson and her baby were found some months later among the mangroves on No. 5 Howick Island, still in the iron tank, but now covered with fresh rainwater from a recent tropical downpour. Ah Sam had died on the beach nearby. A concealed spring existed on the islet, but they had not found it. When the bodies were returned to Cooktown, a procession of 650 escorted them to their burial at Two Mile Cemetery (now Cooktown Cemetery), on the road to the Palmer River goldfields.

== Retribution ==
When it was reported that Aboriginal canoes had been seen on the island, and police could not find any of the Watson party, it was assumed that she had been kidnapped or killed. Mounted police and native troopers from Cooktown under Hervey Fitzgerald (who had just recently been reinstated after disciplinary action for whipping an Aboriginal woman, and promoted to Inspector) shot a number of coastal Cape York people from three mainland groups in retaliation. The number went unrecorded, but it has since been estimated as up to 150 victims, innocent of any crime. Police trashed Aboriginal camps and managed to elicit several false confessions to her murder.

== Legacy ==
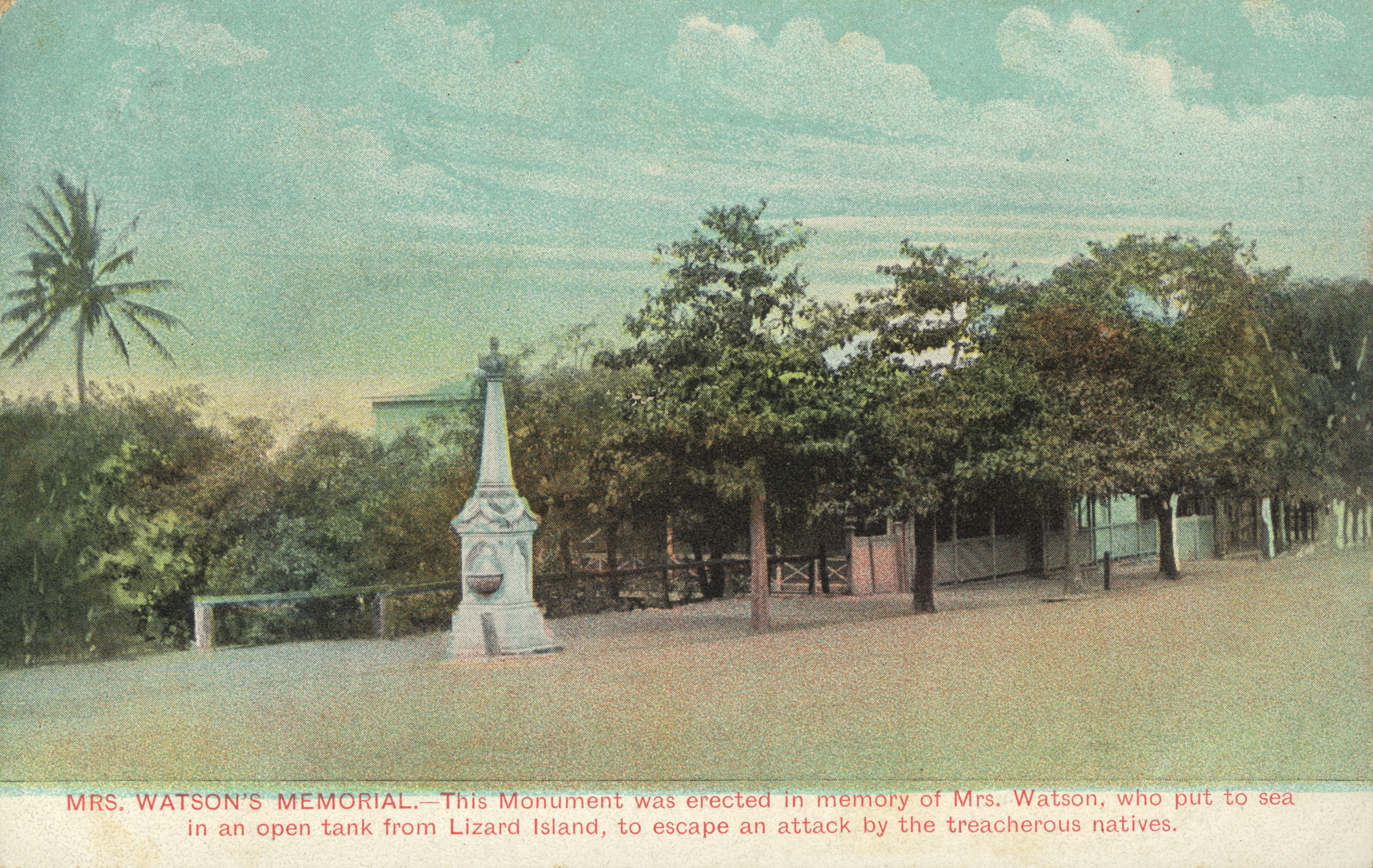
Mrs. Watsons Memorial at Cooktown, circa 1906

In the following years, Watson's story was retold in numerous newspaper and folk accounts, including heroic poems, usually with little attention given to the Aboriginal and Chinese aspects of the events.

The retribution killings devastated Aboriginal communities and their traditional economies in the region, which had already been affected by expanding agriculture and the discovery of gold, leading to the establishment of Cooktown in 1873. In 1886 the first Aboriginal mission was established at Elim Aboriginal Mission by German Lutherans. The mission, along with the Cape Bedford Mission, was the foundation of the present Hope Vale settlement, where many Dingaal people continue to reside.

Five years after her death, a public subscription was raised to fund the Mary Watson's Monument, a marble drinking fountain on the main street, completed in 1886.

A version of the story has been told by Australian author Ion Idriess in his book The Opium Smugglers (1948).

Australian painter Alan Oldfield's series of paintings The Story of Mrs Watson, 1881, begun in 1986 and exploring the spiritual dimensions of the events, are now in the permanent collection of the Cairns Art Gallery.

Author Suzanne Falkiner undertook extensive research and collaborated with Oldfield to publish Lizard Island: The Journey of Mary Watson in 2001. Falkiner interviewed Aboriginal people and members of the Chinese community to obtain oral histories of events. Gordon Charlie an elder of the Dingaal people, suggested that the Aboriginal men were not trying to kill Mary, but drive her away from their ceremonial site. Archaeological and anthropological findings have shown that the house was built on ceremonial ground, with ceremonial stone rings found nearby.

An Arthur C. Clarke character in his 1963 novel Dolphin Island accurately retells the tale mentioning both Aboriginal people and Chinese servants, changing only the island's name to Dolphin Island.

The Queensland Museum holds the iron tank, the paddles, and Watson's bible. The John Oxley Library holds her two diaries (her regular diary on Lizard Island and the one she wrote during the voyage in the tank). The diaries are considered a treasure of the State Library of Queensland featured on the John Oxley Library blog.

Mrs Watson's Cottage is a heritage-listed house ruin at Lizard Island National Park, Shire of Cook, Queensland, Australia.

== Citations ==
=== Sources ===
- Suzanne Falkiner and Alan Oldfield, Lizard Island: The Story of Mary Watson, Allen and Unwin (2000)
- Judy Johnson, The Secret Fate of Mary Watson, Fourth Estate (2011)
