= Guugu Yimithirr =

Guugu Yimithirr may refer to:

- Guugu Yimithirr people, an ethnic group of Australia
- Guugu Yimithirr language, their language
