= Mutumui =

Indigenous Australian people of northern Queensland

The Mutumui were an indigenous Australian people of northern Queensland.

== Language ==
The name of the Mutumui language, now extinct, was Eibole, (Note: Dialect variants of this term are Ebole/Eipolin.) of which a dialect called Ongwara ('northern talk') was spoken to their north.

== Country ==
The Mutumui's traditional territory spread out over an estimated 1,000 square miles (2,600 km^{2}), covering the area of Bathurst Bay and Cape Melville southwards, at Barrow Point and the vicinity of the Starcke and Jeannie Rivers.

== Social organization and people ==
The Mutumui were divided into several hordes/bands, each speaking a distinct dialect version of Mutumui, and of which the probable names of two are known:

- Karbungga, the band at the Jeannie River
- Mbambylmu, at Jack River (Note: In his earlier ethnographic report with Hale (1933) on the tribes of this area, Tindale wrote: "The Ongwara clan camp is principally at Mack River, the Yinini at Melville, the Eibole at Barrow Point.")
- Ithu?

Though tooth avulsion was practised in the area, among the Mutumui is reported to have formed part of the initiatory ceremony itself.

The Mutumui were essentially shore dwellers, mainly in the area around Murdoch Point and Bathurst Bay. They would make forays into the sandstone hinterland on occasion in pursuit of honey, and to hunt opossums and rock wallabies.

== History ==
The Palmer River gold rush following from its discovery in the area 1873 led to a large influx of people seeking to pan for quick riches during the decade of the 1870s, and this surge led to conflict and massacres during the subsequent occupation of the general region just south of the Mutumui. The Aboriginal sacred sites at Clack Island were ransacked for objects from the indigenous cultural patrimony, which included sacred bark paintings, when the physician and naturalist Richard Coppinger on board the British Royal Navy sloop, HMS Alert. Punitive expeditions in the area were carried out following the discovery of Mary Watson's remains in 1882. She had been on Lizard Island and after clashes with local Aboriginal people, which led to the spearing of speared her Chinese cook, led to punitive expeditions against the natives through this area in the early 1880s. Reports of this would have reached the Mutumui and Ithu nearby.

== Alternative names and spellings ==
- Mutumi
- Baulam (Bakanambia exonym)
- Karbungga
- Eibole
- Ongwara
- Jugaiwatha
- Mbambylmu

== Sources ==
- "AIATSIS map of Indigenous Australia". AIATSIS. 14 May 2024.
- Hale, H. M.; Tindale, N.B. (1933). "Aborigines of Princess Charlotte Bay, North Queensland". Records of the South Australian Museum. 5 (1). Adelaide: 64–116.
- Rigsby, Bruce; Allen, Lindy; Hafner, Diane (December 2015). Roberts, Amy; McCaul, Kim (eds.). "The Legacy of Norman B. Tindale at Princess Charlotte Bay in 1927: Lamalama Engagement with Museum Collections" (PDF). Journal of the Anthropological Society of South Australia. 39 (Special Edition: Norman B. Tindale's Research Legacy and the Cultural Heritage of Indigenous Australians): 1–25. ISSN 1034-4438.
- Sharp, R. Lauriston (March 1939). "Tribes and Totemism in North-East Australia". Oceania. 9 (3): 254–275. doi:10.1002/j.1834-4461.1939.tb00232.x. JSTOR 40327744.
- Sutton, Peter (2016). "The Flinders Islands and Cape Melville people in history". In Verstraete, Jean-Christophe; Hafner, Diane (eds.). Land and Language in Cape York Peninsula and the Gulf Country. John Benjamins Publishing Company. pp. 85–103. ISBN 978-9-027-26760-3.
- Tindale, Norman Barnett (1974). "Mutumui (QLD)". Aboriginal Tribes of Australia: Their Terrain, Environmental Controls, Distribution, Limits, and Proper Names. Australian National University.
