= Mary Watson's Monument =

Australian monument

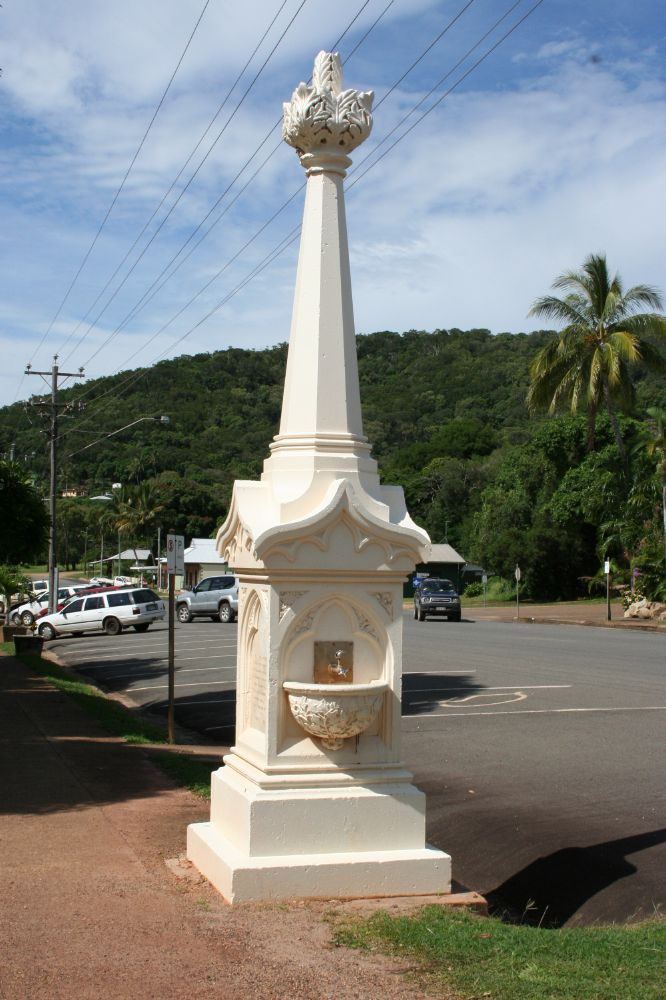
- Mary Watson's Monument, 2010

- Location within Queensland Location within Australia
- 15.4662°S 145.2496°E
- Location: Charlotte Street, Cooktown, Shire of Cook, Queensland, Australia

History
- Design period: 1870s–1890s (late 19th century)
- Built: 1886

Site notes
- Architect: Ernest Greenway

Queensland Heritage Register
- Official name: Mary Watson's Monument
- Type: state heritage (built)
- Designated: 21 October 1992
- Reference no.: 600421
- Significant period: 1886– (social); 1886 (historical, fabric)
- Significant components: memorial – drinking fountain
- Builders: Ernest Greenway

Mary Watson's Monument is a heritage-listed memorial at Charlotte Street, Cooktown, Shire of Cook, Queensland, Australia. It was designed and built by Ernest Greenway in 1886. It was added to the Queensland Heritage Register on 21 October 1992.

== History ==
This monument was erected in 1886 by the citizens of Cooktown to honour Mrs Mary Watson, who perished, along with her infant son and her Chinese employee Ah Sam, from thirst and exposure on one of the islands of the Howick group, northeast of Cooktown, in October 1881.

Watson's tragic death reverberated through far North Queensland. To her contemporaries, she epitomised the self-sacrifice of countless women who were helping to "civilise" the bush, and her youth, her brave struggle to save her infant, and the sad little journal she kept until the end, created an additional pathos and sense of the heroic to her story which captured the public imagination.

Watson (née Oxnam) emigrated from England to Maryborough with her parents in 1877, when she was aged 17. Her father took up farm work near Maryborough and Watson established a small private school in town. She closed this in 1879 and took up a position as a governess in Cooktown, but soon opened her own school there. In May 1880, at Christ Church Cooktown, Watson (aged 20) married Captain Robert Watson, who was in partnership with PC Fuller in a beche-de-mer station on Lizard Island, approximately 50 miles (80 km) northeast of Cooktown. Following the marriage, the Watsons moved to Lizard Island, where in 1879 Robert Watson had erected a dwelling and smoke and store-house, and established a small fruit and vegetable garden. Two Chinese men, Ah Sam and Ah Leong, were employed to assist in the house and garden respectively. Watson returned to Cooktown in March 1881 to await the birth of her first child early in June, and was back on Lizard Island with her baby by July.

On 1 September 1881, Robert Watson and Fuller took their beche-de-mer boats 200 miles (320 km) north to Night Island, where they set up an out-station and smoke house, anticipating an absence from Lizard Island of about 6 weeks. Watson was left on the island with her infant son and the two Chinese employees. On 27 September, a group of mainland Aborigines arrived at Lizard Island, which, according to oral tradition, contained a sacred site in the approximate vicinity of the beche-de-mer station. Watson's journal reveals that these Aborigines clearly wanted the foreigners to leave the place. It is thought that on 29 September they speared and killed Ah Leong, who was working in the garden approximately quarter of a mile from Watson's dwelling, although his body was never found. On 30 September, they gathered on the beach below the dwelling, dispersed when Watson fired a rifle and revolver, but returned on 1 October and severely wounded Ah Sam.

Fearing a further attack and lacking any other means of escape, Watson packed a few belongings, food, water and two paddles into a cut-down iron ship's tank used for boiling the beche-de-mer, and set off with Ah Sam and the baby on 2 October. By 4 October, they had reached a reef, where they remained another day, hoping to sight a passing ship. On 6 October, they pulled onto No.1 Howick Island to replenish their fresh water. As Aborigines were camped there, the refugees moved to a reef as soon as the tide was in and on 7 October pulled to No.5 Howick Island which, although it lay along the steamer route, unfortunately lacked fresh water. Too weak to continue, they hoped to attract the attention of a passing ship, but were unsuccessful. Watson kept a brief diary throughout the ordeal. The last entry is dated 11 October:

Still all alive. Ferrier [her child] very much better this morning. Self feeling very weak. I think it will rain to-day; clouds very heavy; winds not quite so hard.

No rain. Morning weather fine. Ah Sam preparing to die. Have not seen him since 9. Ferrier more cheerful. Self not feeling at all well. Have not seen any boat of any description. No water. (Nearly dead with thirst.)

Their remains were found by crew from a passing fishing vessel on 19 January 1882 and later were identified by Robert Watson. He was still fishing at Restoration Island in late October when informed by a passing vessel that Aborigines had sacked the Lizard Island buildings and that his wife, child and the two Chinese employees were missing. He had returned immediately to Lizard Island, and had been searching for his family since 7 November 1881.

Watson's ordeal and heroism captured the hearts and minds of her contemporaries. On 29 January 1882, a public funeral attended by approximately 650 persons was accorded Watson, her child and Ah Sam by the citizens of Cooktown, and their remains were buried in the Cooktown Cemetery.

The tragedy exacerbated European antagonism toward Aborigines in the Cooktown area. A punitive raid was carried out, but historian Geoffrey Bolton suggests the wrong group of Aborigines were dealt with.

In 1885, public subscription was called for a drinking-fountain memorial to Watson, and this was erected with the co-operation of the Cooktown Municipal Council in 1886 at a cost of £165. The memorial was unveiled in February 1886 by Mayor John Davis. It was erected just outside the grounds of the town hall, straddling the stone kerbing and guttering in Charlotte Street. The monument is the work of monumental mason Ernest Greenway of Ipswich, who won the design competition. However, there was later some question over who authorised Greenway to include the name of Edward D'Arcy as the mayor in 1886.

== Description ==
Watson's monument is situated at the corner of Adelaide and Charlotte Streets, Cooktown, on the edge of the Charlotte Street footpath abutting the road, a little south of, and on the same side of the street as, the Cook Shire Council Chambers. It straddles the stone kerbing and guttering of Charlotte Street, and lacks a formal setting.

The structure is of painted concrete, and comprises plinth, square base and octagonal tapering spire. On the plinth the names E Greenway and Ipswich are inscribed. The four faces of the base have insets with two centred and shouldered arches. Floral carved relief are located in the cusp of the shouldered arches and above the two centred arches. The base is surmounted by ogee hood moulds which have a cyma recta profile and tracery below. Working-order water fountains with semi-circular bowls finished in a leaf pattern are located on the north and south faces, and there is an inscribed marble panel on each of the east and west faces. The inscription on the western panel reads:

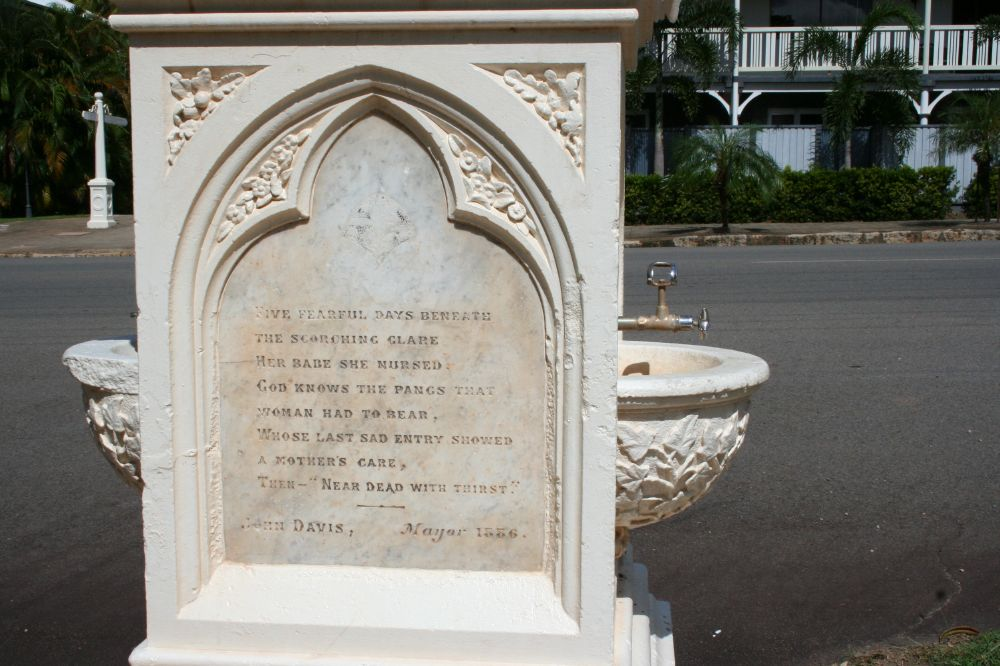
Western panel, 2010

Five fearful days beneath
the scorching glare
Her babe she nursed.
God knows the pangs
that woman had to bear,
Whose last sad entry showed
a mother's care'
Then - "Near dead with thirst".
John Davis Mayor 1886

The inscription on the eastern panel is:

IN MEMORIAM MRS WATSON,
The Heroine of Lizard Island
Cooktown North Queensland AD 1881
Erected 1886. Edward D'Arcy Mayor. 1885

A tapering octagonal spire sits above the base and is finished with an acanthus leaf finial.

In recent years work to repair the water pipes to the fountains has necessitated the concrete being cut into, the pipes exposed, and then the concrete repaired. This appears as a narrow vertical incision down the northern face of the monument, from the fountain to the ground.

== Heritage listing ==
Mary Watson's Monument was listed on the Queensland Heritage Register on 21 October 1992 having satisfied the following criteria.

The place is important in demonstrating the evolution or pattern of Queensland's history.

Mary Watson's Monument is significant as an important reminder of the tragedies which accompanied early European settlement in Queensland, and of the lack of communication and understanding between indigenous and non-indigenous peoples during this "frontier" phase of our history. That the memorial does not commemorate Ah Sam, the young Chinese man who perished with Mrs Watson, is evidence of the disjunctive nature of Queensland's early colonial society, and in the omission, remains a clear illustration of the racist attitudes of the time.

The place demonstrates rare, uncommon or endangered aspects of Queensland's cultural heritage.

It is also the only known public monument to an individual woman (other than a head of state) in Queensland.

The place is important in demonstrating the principal characteristics of a particular class of cultural places.

It has heritage value as a good example of its type: a decorative, late 19th century public memorial drinking fountain which encompasses both utilitarian and commemorative functions.

The place is important because of its aesthetic significance.

It has aesthetic value, and makes a pleasing contribution to the historic streetscape of Charlotte Street, Cooktown's principal thoroughfare.

The place has a strong or special association with a particular community or cultural group for social, cultural or spiritual reasons.

The place is valued by the Cooktown community for its historical significance, and it is a tourist attraction in the town.

The place has a special association with the life or work of a particular person, group or organisation of importance in Queensland's history.

It has a strong association with Mary Watson, and serves to perpetuate the legend (and mythology) of her death.

== See also ==
- Mrs Watson's Cottage on Lizard Island, also heritage-listed
