= Ithu =

Indigenous Australian people in Queensland, Australia

The Ithu were an indigenous Australian people of the eastern coast of the Cape York Peninsula, northern Queensland.

== Country ==
The Ithu's territory, including Noble Island, the adjacent reefs, and islands, such as Howick within the Howick island group opposite Barrow Point.

== People ==
Very little has survived regarding the Ithu, and Norman Tindale suggested that they might possibly have been a horde of the Mutumui.

== Alternative name ==
- Wurkuldi

== Sources ==
- Tindale, Norman Barnett (1974a). "Ithu (QLD)". Aboriginal Tribes of Australia: Their Terrain, Environmental Controls, Distribution, Limits, and Proper Names. Australian National University. Archived from the original on 2 July 2017.
- Tindale, Norman B. (1974b). Aboriginal Tribes of Australia: Their Terrain, Environmental Controls, Distribution, Limits, and Proper Names. Canberra: ANU Press. ISBN 0-7081-0741-9. LCCN 75516991. OCLC 3052288. OL 4795942M. Wikidata Q128257949.
