= Mrs Watson's Cottage =

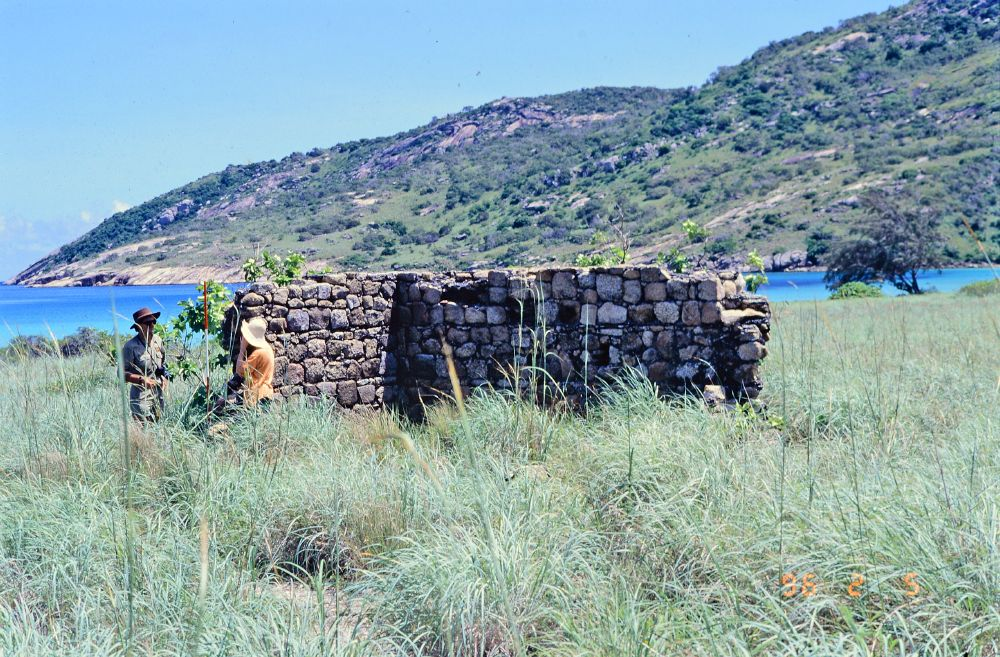
- Stone ruins, 1996

- Location within Queensland Location within Australia
- 14.6666°S 145.4604°E
- Location: Lizard Island National Park, Shire of Cook, Queensland, Australia

Queensland Heritage Register
- Official name: Stone ruin at Lizard Island, 'Mrs Watson's Cottage'
- Type: state heritage (archaeological)
- Designated: 21 October 1992
- Reference no.: 600430
- Significant period: 1860s-c. 1880 (fabric); 1881 (historical)

Mrs Watson's Cottage is a heritage-listed house ruin at Lizard Island National Park, Shire of Cook, Queensland, Australia. It is also known as Stone ruin at Lizard Island. It was added to the Queensland Heritage Register on 21 October 1992.

== History ==
The stone ruins overlooking Watson's Bay on the north side of Lizard Island may be linked to the use of the island for beche-de-mer fishing by Europeans in the 19th century. They are popularly associated with the incidents surrounding the deaths of Mary Watson, her baby son and two Chinese employees in 1881, following a confrontation with mainland Aborigines.

Aboriginal people used Lizard Island for thousands of years before Europeans arrived in north Queensland. The island is thought to have been used for ceremonial purposes and Captain James Cook recorded observing several frames of huts and large middens during his voyage along the coast in 1770.

The harvesting of beche-de-mer, prized by Chinese as a culinary delicacy, was carried out along the north Australian coast from about 1700 by fishermen from the south of Sulawesi, who made regular trips to catch and process the creatures. They require preservation by boiling and smoking before transportation and this meant that camps for the purpose were set up on shore until preservation began to be carried out on board ship in the 1890s. Europeans took up this trade in the early 19th century, following a suggestion of Matthew Flinders. In 1827, 10 long tons (10 t) of beche-de-mer was exported from the Cooktown area to Timor. In 1860, a group of Europeans, Chinese and South Sea Islanders arrived on Lizard Island to establish a processing base there and appear to have settled on Watson's Bay. Although the venture was not successful and was abandoned in October 1861 after a number of them died, they constructed a stone building during their occupancy. Other groups subsequently worked there including more than 40 South Sea Islanders employed by Captain Delargy in the late 1860s.

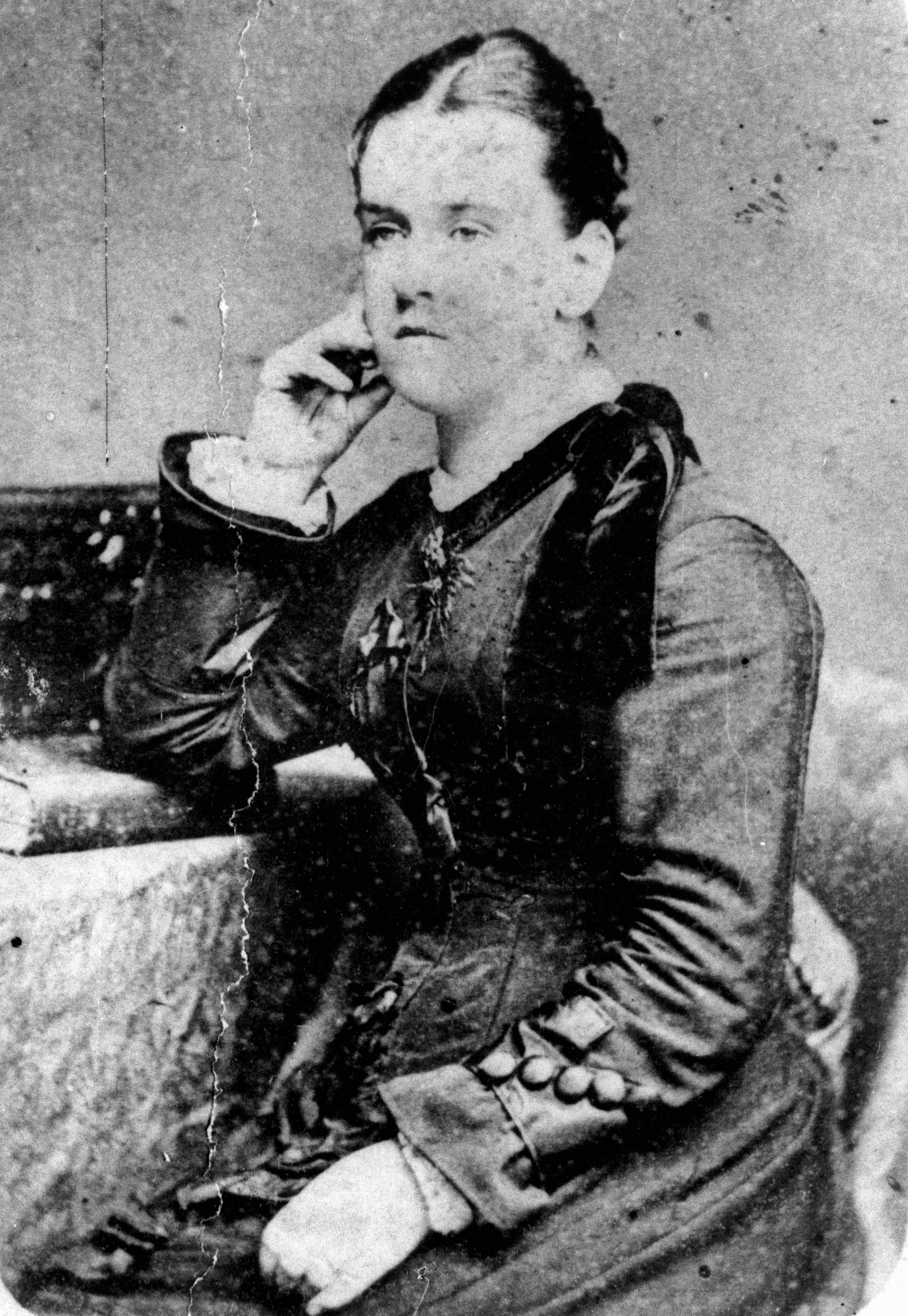
Portrait of Mary Beatrice Watson

In 1879, Captain Robert Watson and P.C. Fuller established a station to carry out beche-de-mer processing on Watson's Bay. It is possible that they used or adapted this building, however, this is not known and they did construct buildings themselves. In May 1880, Robert Watson married the 20-year-old Mary Oxnam, who emigrated from England with her parents in 1877 and had worked briefly as a teacher before her marriage. The Watsons moved to Lizard Island, where Robert Watson had erected a dwelling, smokehouse and store, and established a small fruit and vegetable garden. Two Chinese men, Ah Sam and Ah Leong, were employed to assist in the house and garden respectively. Mary returned to Cooktown in March 1881 to await the birth of her first child early in June, and was back on Lizard Island by July.

On 1 September 1881, Robert Watson and Fuller took their boats 200 miles (320 km) north to Night Island, intending to be away for about 6 weeks. Watson was left on the island with her infant son and the two Chinese employees. On 27 September, a group of Aborigines from Starke and Point Lookout arrived at Lizard Island, which, according to oral tradition, contained a sacred site in the approximate vicinity of the beche-de-mer station. It is thought that on 29 September they speared and killed Ah Leong, who was working in the garden approximately quarter of a mile from Watson's dwelling. The next day they gathered on the beach below the house, dispersed when Watson fired a rifle and revolver, but returned on 1 October and speared Ah Sam, severely wounding him.

Fearing a further attack and lacking other means of escape, Watson packed a few belongings, food, water and two paddles into a cut-down iron ship's tank used for boiling the beche-de-mer, and set off with Ah Sam and the baby on 2 October. They eventually reached No.5 Howick Island, which, although it lay along the steamer route, unfortunately lacked fresh water. Too weak to continue, they hoped to attract the attention of a passing ship, but were unsuccessful and died from thirst. Watson kept a brief diary throughout the ordeal. The contents were later made public and her uncomplaining courage, composure and efforts to protect her child evoked widespread pity and admiration. The last entry is dated 11 October 1881.

In the meantime, Robert Watson had returned to find signs of an Aboriginal attack having taken place and his wife and child missing. He began to search for them and the incident exacerbated European antagonism toward Aborigines in the Cooktown area. A punitive raid was carried out, during which many people were killed, though people at Cape Flattery rather than those actually responsible were targeted.

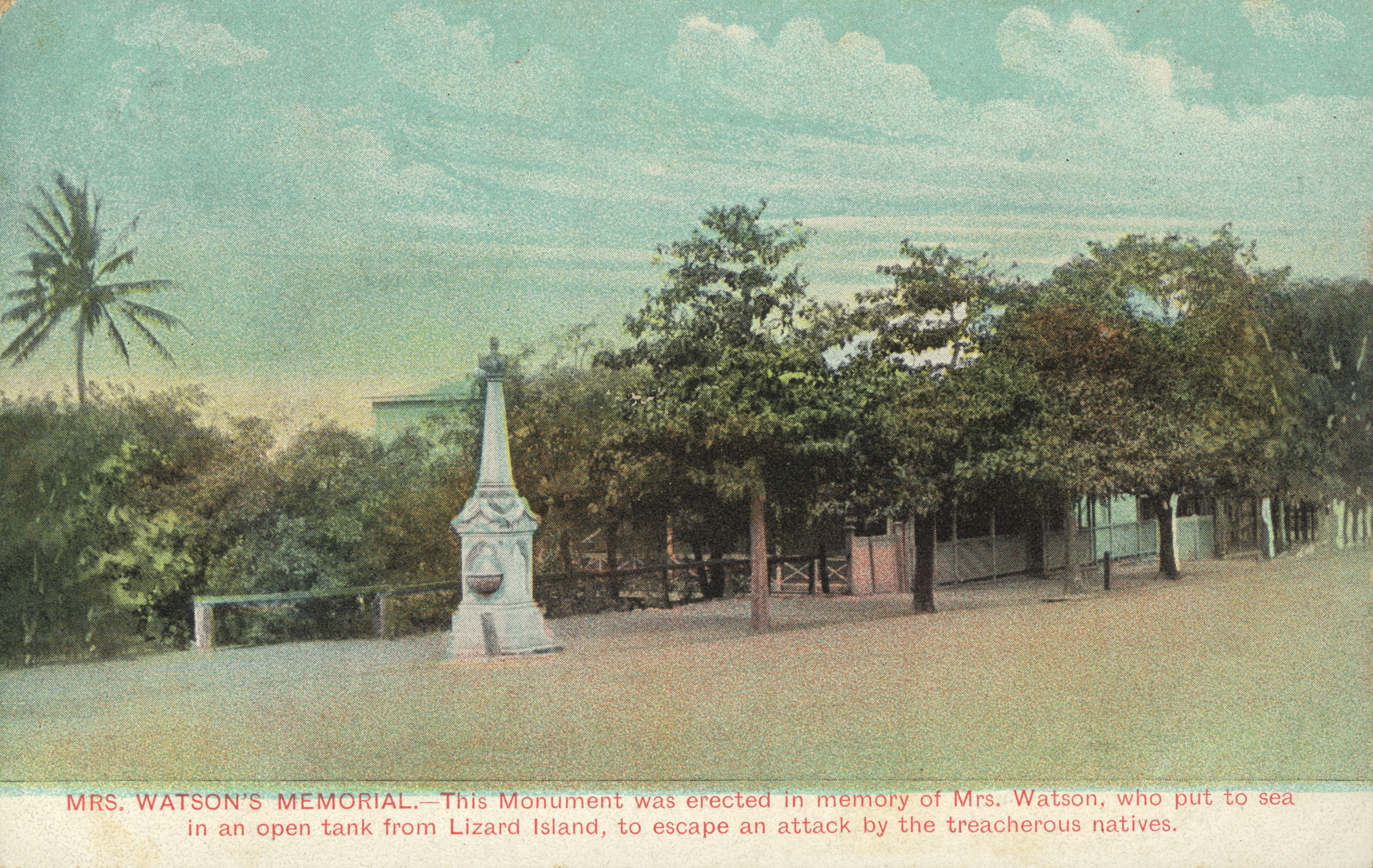
Mrs. Watsons Memorial at Cooktown, circa 1906

The crew of a passing fishing vessel found the remains of Watson, Ah Sam and baby Ferrier on 19 January 1882 and they were accorded a huge public funeral in Cooktown. In 1885, public subscriptions were called for the Mary Watson's Monument, a drinking-fountain memorial; this was erected with the co-operation of the Cooktown Municipal Council in 1886. The tank in which she escaped was on display at the Queensland Museum for many years.

Lizard Island was gazetted as a National Park in 1939 and now contains a resort to the west of the ruins. The story has continued to stir the public imagination and the site of the ruins generally believed to be Watson's cottage remains a focus for the memory this tragic incident in the European settlement of the North.

== Description ==
The stone ruins are located approximately 60 metres (200 ft) from Watson's Beach and 35 metres (115 ft) north west of Ferrier's Creek at Watson's Bay on the north side of Lizard Island. This is a high rocky island 90 kilometres (56 mi) NNE of Cooktown and 31 kilometres (19 mi) from the coast NE of Cape Flattery.

The ruins consist of footings and sections of wall of what was a five- roomed building measuring approximately 14 by 10 metres (46 by 33 ft) and which appears to have been built in several stages. It is aligned parallel with the beach and has substantially collapsed with only the northwestern corner surviving to its full height, which is approximately two metres above the existing ground level. A portion of a collapsed interior wall and scattered stones also remain. The walls are constructed of local Finlayson granite, using a coursed rubble technique with the stones laid in rough courses with banding at quarter, half and three quarter heights. The stones are cemented with a mortar made of burnt coral and beach sand.

== Heritage listing ==
Mrs Watson's Cottage was listed on the Queensland Heritage Register on 21 October 1992 having satisfied the following criteria.

The place is important in demonstrating the evolution or pattern of Queensland's history.

Whether or not Watson inhabited the ruins, which is in some doubt, they symbolise the intrusion of Europeans into areas long used by Aboriginal people and the often tragic confrontations that took place in the subsequent competition for land and resources. Watson's sad and courageous death evoked widespread public admiration and respect and affected public attitudes towards Aborigines in the area. The building may well be associated with beche-de-mer fishing, an important industry in the Cooktown area in the 19th century.

The place has potential to yield information that will contribute to an understanding of Queensland's history.

The age, origin and use of the building is unproven and the ruins and surrounding area have the potential to provide information about this and possibly about the late 19th beche-de-mer industry in north Queensland.

The place is important because of its aesthetic significance.

The Lizard Island ruins have visual appeal as a picturesque standing ruin in an isolated setting overlooking the sea and evoke the empathy of visitors towards Mrs. Watson's tragic story.

The place has a strong or special association with a particular community or cultural group for social, cultural or spiritual reasons.

The Dingaal traditional owners consider the site significant as a symbol of the end of traditional ways, their displacement from traditional lands, the violation of sacred sites and completion with Europeans for resources.

The place has a special association with the life or work of a particular person, group or organisation of importance in Queensland's history.

The ruins are widely believed to be associated with Watson and act as evocative memorial of her ordeal and death.
