= Noble Island =

Island in Queensland, Australia

- Interactive map of Noble Island

Geography
- Location: Northern Australia
- Coordinates: 14.505°S 144.766°E
- Area: 0.30 km^{2} (0.12 sq mi)

Administration
- Australia
- State: Queensland

Noble Island is part of the Great Barrier Reef Marine Park in the Howick Group National Park and is about 100 km south-east of Cape Melville, Queensland. It is around 30 hectares or 0.3 square km in size.

It was the home of the indigenous Australian Ithu people.

The island is 25 km east of Howick Island and home to sea turtles and sea pigeons.

== See also ==
- List of islands of Australia
