= Howick =

Howick may refer to:

== Places ==
- Howick, KwaZulu-Natal, in South Africa
  - Howick Falls
- Howick, Lancashire, a small hamlet (Howick Cross) and former civil parish in England
- Howick, New Zealand
  - Howick Historical Village
  - Howick (New Zealand electorate), a former parliamentary electorate, 1993–1996
  - Howick ward, electoral district of Auckland Council
- Howick, Northumberland, a village in England
  - Howick Hall, a stately home
  - Howick house, a Mesolithic site
- Howick, Ontario, Canada
- Howick, Quebec, Canada
- Howick, Western Australia, in the Shire of Esperance, Australia
- Howick Group National Park
- Howick Island, Australia

== People ==
- Baron Howick of Glendale
- Baron Grey of Howick and Viscount Howick (in Northumberland), subsidiary titles of Earl Grey
- Jeremy Howick

== Other uses ==
- USS Howick Hall (ID-1303), a United States Navy ship

== See also ==
- Hawick, a town in the Scottish Borders council area
