= Endeavour River National Park =

National park in Queensland, Australia

- IUCN category II (national park)
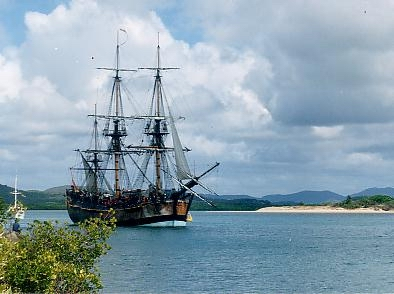
- The HM Bark Endeavour replica in the Endeavour River. Endeavour River National Park is in the background.

- Location within Queensland
- Location: Queensland
- Nearest city: Cooktown
- Coordinates: 15°26′31″S 145°13′03″E
- Area: 21.7 km^{2} (8.4 sq mi)
- Established: First in 1975, expanded and newly gazetted on 24 November 2006
- Governing body: Queensland Parks and Wildlife Service
- Website: Official website

Endeavour River National Park is a national park in Queensland, Australia, gazetted to protect and preserve some of the natural and cultural resources in and around the mouth of the Endeavour River, immediately north of the small town of Cooktown. The park is located 1,561 kilometres (970 mi) northwest of Brisbane.

Naturalists Joseph Banks and Daniel Solander collected specimens of local 'Australian' flora in 1770 from this area which were taken back to the Royal Botanic Gardens in England. Sydney Parkinson first illustrated local Australian Aboriginal people encountered nearby, plus flora collected and fauna seen; and kangaroos were first given their modern English name (borrowing from the local Guugu Yimithirr language).

HM Bark Endeavour, under the command of Lieutenant James Cook, had struck reefs and been pulled ashore for repairs along the river locally known within Guugu Yimithirr as Wabalumbaal, possibly near the present site of Cooktown. The river was renamed on James Cook's charts as the Endeavour River, after Endeavour, and the current National Park appears, in turn, to be named after the river.

The present National Park contains coastal dunes, freshwater wetlands, mangrove forests, heathlands, tropical woodlands and the estuary plus parts of the Endeavour River catchment. It is mostly accessible by boat only, and still contains flora and fauna species of the kind collected and illustrated back in 1770.

== See also ==
- Captain Cook mythology: Australia
- Protected areas of Queensland
