= Cooktown Cemetery =

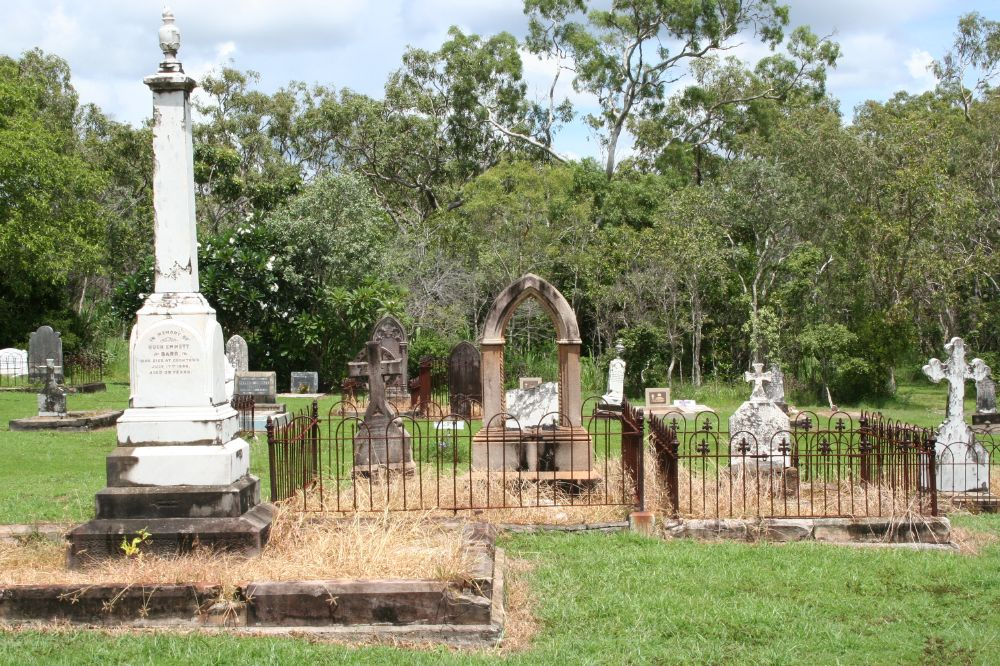
- Cooktown Cemetery, 2010

- Location within Queensland Location within Australia
- 15.4759°S 145.2411°E
- Location: Charlotte Street, Cooktown, Shire of Cook, Queensland, Australia

History
- Design period: 1870s–1890s (late 19th century)
- Built: 1874–1920

Queensland Heritage Register
- Official name: Cooktown Cemetery
- Type: state heritage (landscape, built)
- Designated: 8 April 1997
- Reference no.: 601147
- Significant period: 1874–1920 (fabric, historical); 1874– (social)
- Significant components: pathway/walkway, memorial/monument, fire box, gate – entrance, cemetery, fence/wall – perimeter, track, grave surrounds/railings, headstone, burial/grave, trees/plantings, sign, grave marker, denominational divisions, shrine, well

Cooktown Cemetery is a heritage-listed cemetery at Charlotte Street, Cooktown, Shire of Cook, Queensland, Australia. It was built from 1874 to 1920. It was added to the Queensland Heritage Register on 8 April 1997.

== History ==
Cooktown Cemetery, with over 3,000 burials, has been in continuous use since soon after the town was established in October 1873. Although gazettal was not until mid-1875 the site was used earlier; the oldest marked grave is that of Rev. Francis Tripp, an Anglican clergyman who died at Cooktown on 20 May 1874. Cemetery records date from 1875, with approximately 1830 burials recorded in the period 1877 to 1920. The colourful mix of nationalities and religions evident in these records and in the cemetery itself reflect the nature of Cooktown in the late 19th and early 20th centuries as the Endeavour River port for the Palmer River Goldfields.

Cooktown "mushroomed" in the mid-1870s as a port and supply and administrative centre. Within six months of its establishment in October 1873 there were 20 restaurants, 12 large and 20 smaller stores, 6 butchers, 5 bakers, 3 tinsmiths, and chemists, fancy-goods shops, watchmakers, bootmakers and saddlers, conducting businesses in the town; 65 publican's licenses had been issued for the Cooktown- Palmer River district, with 30 more applied for by April 1874. There was an estimated 3,000 floating population in the town itself, and thousands of men en route to the goldfields. Large numbers of Chinese made their way to the Palmer goldfields via Cooktown in the period 1873–77, and Chinese storekeepers were amongst the earliest to establish businesses in Cooktown. Two Cooktown newspapers were established in 1874, a state school, customs house, court house, post office and several churches were erected by 1875, and the town was declared a municipality on 5 April 1876. The 1876 census revealed a population of over 9,200 persons on the then extensive Palmer goldfields, and the town of Cooktown had a population of just under 2,200.

In the 1880s Cooktown business "boomed". A railway was constructed from Cooktown to Laura between 1884 and 1888, further opening the port to development. By the late 1880s it was the centre not only of a thriving mining district (boosted by the 1887 discovery of tin along the Annan River), but also of pearling, beche-de-mer, and pastoral activity. After 1885 Cooktown was also the main port for Queensland trade with New Guinea. Despite the decline in alluvial output from the Palmer River goldfields in the mid-1880s and the corresponding decline in the town's importance as the principal port of Far North Queensland from the early 1890s, by the turn of the century the Cook and Palmer census districts still had a population of just under 6,000, (despite less than 1,300 persons on the Palmer, Coen and Hamilton goldfields) and the municipality of Cooktown retained a population of nearly 2,000.

In the earliest days of Cooktown settlement (the summer of 1873–74), there were a number of burials along the ridge above Charlotte Street, between Banks and Green Streets. When the town was surveyed in April 1874, this burial ground was surveyed as building allotments and roadway, and in the same month the first Cooktown Hospital was erected on some of these blocks. By September 1874 the Hospital Committee, which considered the shallow graves within the hospital grounds and on the adjacent roadway to be a health risk, was urging the colonial government to provide funds to remove the remains to the Cooktown Cemetery, apparently in use at that time although neither surveyed nor gazetted. In reaction to public concern, surveyor James Reid was instructed to formally survey the Cooktown Cemetery, a reserve of 15 acres (6.1 ha) south of the town near the Two-Mile Creek, and this was completed by early November 1874. What appear to be a number of graves are indicated on the survey plan, suggesting that the cemetery was in use already.

The Cooktown Cemetery was proclaimed formally in June 1875 and 5 trustees appointed – one representing each of the principal denominations in Cooktown: Church of England, Roman Catholic, Presbyterian, Hebrew and Wesleyan Methodist. No Chinese person was appointed, despite the high proportion of Chinese resident in Cooktown and surrounding district at this period. During the second half of 1875 the cemetery reserve was fenced (probably in timber) and cemetery gates erected. When the land around the cemetery was surveyed by surveyor Berwick in February 1876 as suburban subdivisions, the cemetery reserve was extended to the east by just over 9 acres (3.6 ha), establishing a frontage to the Palmer Road and necessitating a repositioning of the cemetery gates.

In 1876 the cemetery was established more formally. From mid-June 1876 a sexton was employed, and timber was purchased for a sexton's cottage and separate office in the grounds; surveyor Berwick was contracted to lay out the grounds in subdivisions (possibly denominational divisions); and roads were made through the cemetery. In September 1876 cemetery rules and regulations were gazetted.

The cemetery appears to have been well maintained during the 19th century. In April 1891 the trustees were commended by the community for improvements to the Cemetery avenue and flower beds, and visitors were warned against allowing dogs into the grounds.

The cemetery bears testimony to the diverse nationalities who came to Cooktown and the Palmer goldfields in the late 19th century, and includes the graves of French, Chinese, English, Swedish, Germans and South Sea Islanders. Of particular prominence are the Chinese – mostly gardeners, miners, labourers and storekeepers – who account for approximately one-sixth (about 300) of the burials in the period 1877–1920. It is understood that most Chinese initially interred here were later exhumed and returned to China. The contribution of the Chinese to the development of Cooktown and the Palmer River goldfields in the late 19th century cannot be underestimated. As late as 1901, when the population of the Palmer River goldfield was just 600 persons, 377 of them were Chinese, and Chinese accounted for approximately 7.5% of the population of the Cook and Palmer census districts. Cooktown itself had a substantial "Chinatown" - storekeepers, boardinghouse keepers, restaurateurs – and in 1887 the local Chinese community erected a Shrine in the cemetery to honour their dead.

With the decline of Cooktown during the first half of the 20th century, Cooktown Cemetery fell into disrepair. Deliberately-lit grassfires caused considerable damage. Numerous complaints about the condition of the grounds and lack of maintenance prompted the Cook Shire Council in August 1941 to request to the Lands Department that the Council take over trusteeship of the cemetery. The surviving trustees finally tendered their resignations in February 1943, and the cemetery was placed under the control of Cook Shire Council. However, under Council control, responsibility for burials was left for many years to local undertakers, who appear to have worked to two different cemetery layouts, causing considerable confusion. Some community interpretative work has been undertaken in recent years, with a large sign erected at the entrance to the cemetery and several of the more historically significant graves decorated. In the mid-1990s, Cook Shire Council commenced a conservation programme.

The cemetery has two graves that are registered by the Commonwealth War Graves Commission as casualties of World War I though they died after end of hostilities in 1918, Privates J.J. Dick (died 24 August 1921, grave in Methodist section) and John Robertson Prentice (died 31 December 1919, grave in Presbyterian section) who both served in the Australian Imperial Force.

== Description ==
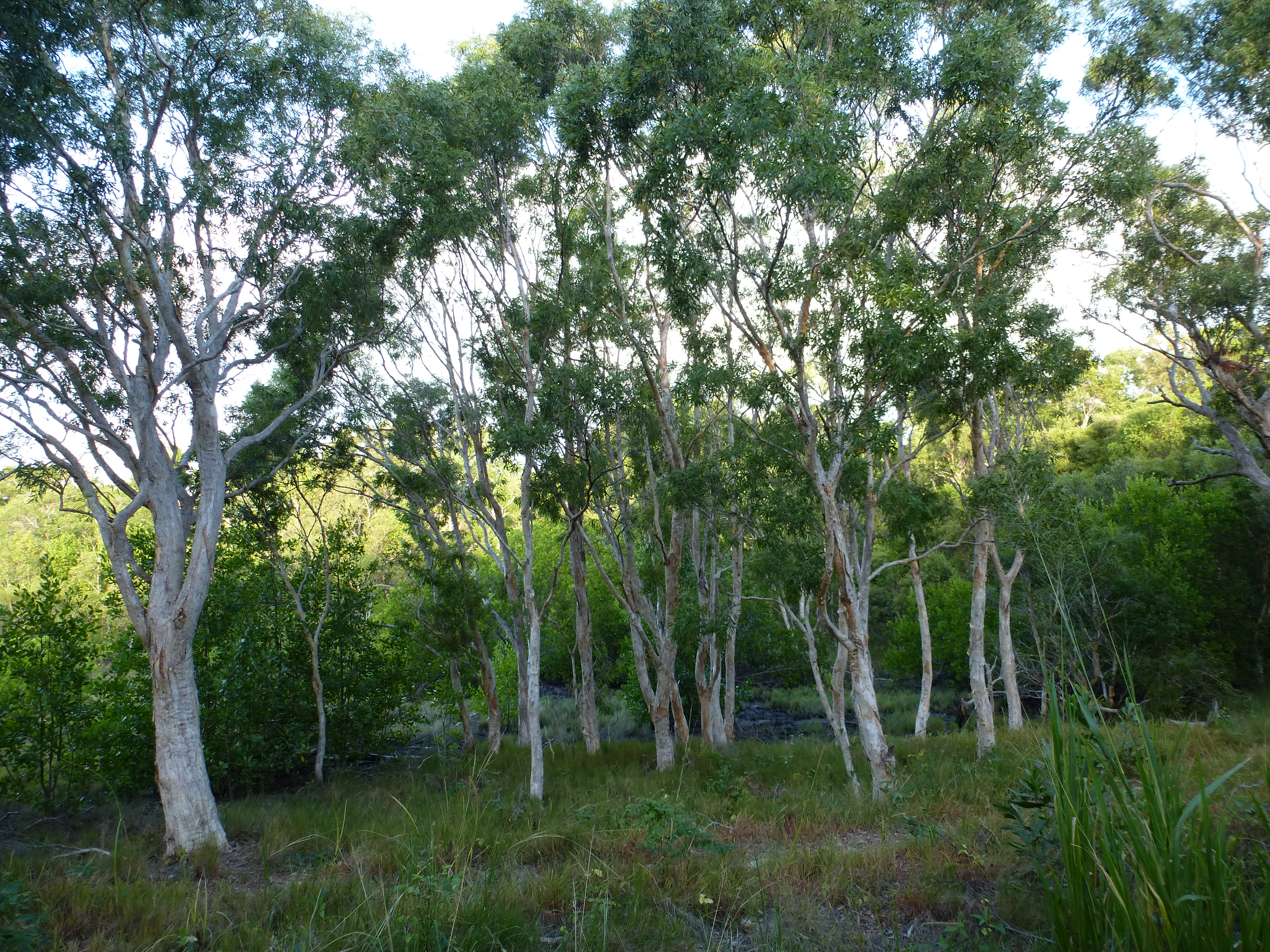
Melaleuca acacioides at Cooktown Cemetery, 2015

Cooktown Cemetery is a 9.72 hectares (24.0 acres) reserve situated approximately 1.7 kilometres (1.1 mi) southwest from the centre of town. The reserve fronts the Cooktown-McIvor River Road (formerly the Palmer Road) to the southeast, and gazetted but unmade roads form its northern and southern boundaries. On the west it is bounded by a local government reserve for slaughtering purposes, and on the east by freehold land. There is a prominent, locally devised interpretative sign in front of the reserve.

The northern and southwestern portions of the reserve are covered in native vegetation: Melaleuca spp., Eucalyptus spp (principally Bloodwood), Pandanus palms, native gingers and various grasses. A granite outcrop about two-thirds of the distance into the reserve from the Cooktown-McIcvor River Road entrance has restricted most of the 3,000 plus burials to the southern and eastern sections of the reserve. The majority of the marked graves are located in an open, grassed section in the southeast quarter of the reserve. There are some trees in this section, mostly self-sown, but a number of frangipanni – possibly remnants of a tree-lined drive – and coconut palms, appear to be early planting.

There is an early cast-iron palisade fence with spearheaded stakes, manufactured by Bayliss Jones and Bayliss of London, along the front boundary of the reserve addressing the Cooktown-McIvor River Road. Early main entrance gates have been removed and replaced by a metal chain. From this entrance a road extends northward, forking in the middle of the reserve. The track to the west terminates at a Chinese Shrine in the middle western section of the reserve, and the other extends to the eastern boundary. These tracks and two secondary pathways divide the cemetery into denominational sections – Roman Catholic, Presbyterian, Church of England, Methodist – and there are also Jewish, Buddhist, Islamic, Aboriginal and "pagan" groupings. The most recent graves, in less distinct denominational groupings, are found along the eastern boundary.

The graves in the grassed section of the cemetery are mostly Christian and are aligned roughly east–west, although there are some exceptions, and one faces directly west. Approximately 300 memorials of diverse design, mostly in sandstone or marble and some iron, are scattered through this area. Headstones mostly survive for the social elite and professional classes – the medical, religious and administrative group, along with successful Cooktown merchants, businesspersons and civic leaders. Graves of working people – labourers, carriers, dressmakers, market gardeners, miners – now tend to lie unmarked. Most of the stone memorials were constructed in Brisbane, Townsville or Cairns and shipped to Cooktown, and costs could well have been prohibitive. The surviving headstones and memorials reflect over 120 years of diverse memorial and cultural symbolism and illustrate the work of stonemasons Lowther, J Simmonds, and Hobbs & Carter of Brisbane; Patten Bros of Sydney; Ernest Greenway of Ipswich; and Melrose & Fenwick of Townsville and Cairns. A number of the graves in this section have ornate cast-iron railings, the most elaborate of which is that around the graves of the Sisters of Mercy.

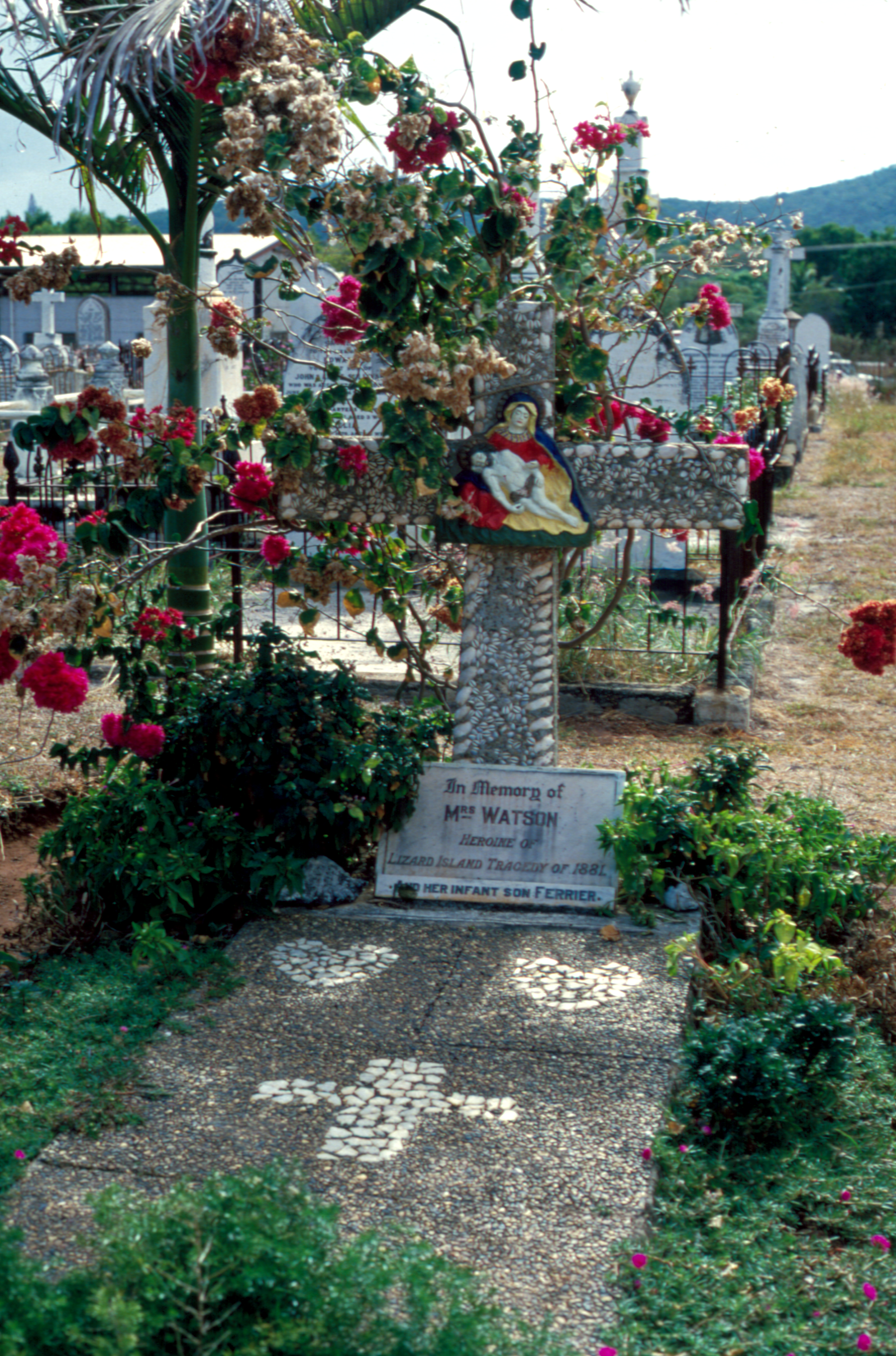
Grave of Mrs Mary Watson, 1986

Other graves of note include those of Mrs Mary Watson, who died of thirst escaping hostile Aborigines on Lizard Island in 1881; Albert Ross Hovell, a prominent mariner and son of the explorer William Hovell, but known more specifically for his involvement in 'blackbirding'; Elizabeth Jardine, whose husband John founded Somerset on Cape York Peninsula, and whose sons were pioneer cattlemen in Northern Australia; Mother Mary de Sales Meagher, founder of the Sisters of Mercy Convent in Cooktown; Albert McLaren, founder of the New Guinea Mission in 1891; Brinsley Guise Sheridan, police magistrate at Cooktown and Cardwell; Rev. John Hutchinson, first Roman Catholic Bishop of the Vicariate Apostolic of Cooktown; Dr H Kortum, understood to be Cooktown's and Queensland's last German consul; and a 1907 memorial to French mariners who died of yellow fever.

To the west of the grassy section is a small grouping of Jewish gravestones and some Aboriginal graves, marked with sapling branches at each corner, and north of these is the Chinese Shrine. Native vegetation has re-established in these areas. A few relict trees, including mangoes, line the main track to the Chinese shrine for a short distance.

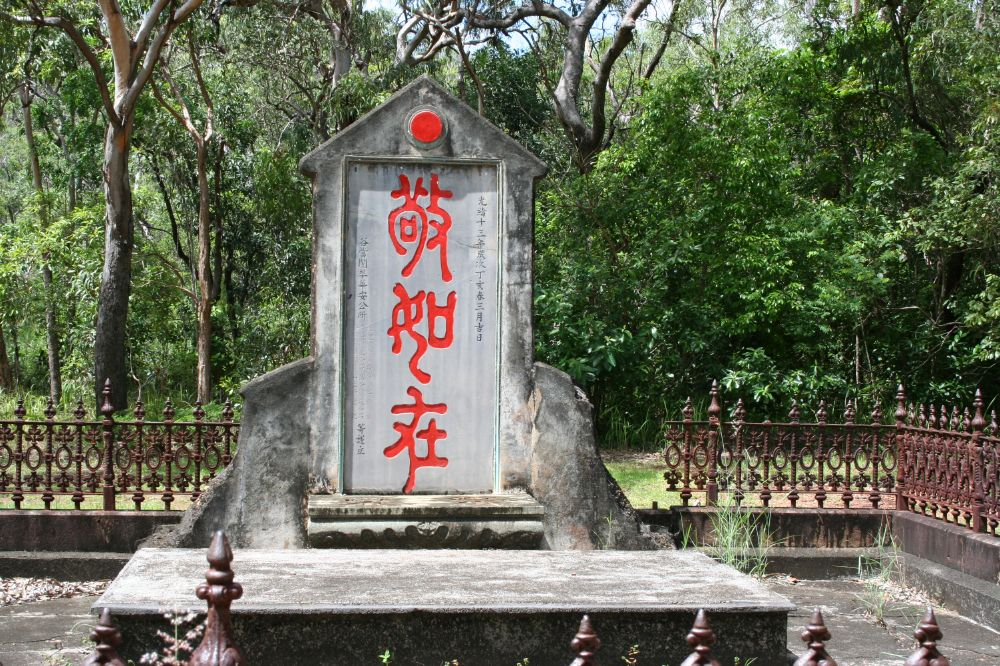
Chinese shrine, 2010

The Chinese shrine comprises a rectangular concrete platform approximately 6 metres (20 ft) long by 3 metres (9.8 ft) wide lying in a north–south direction, at the southern end of which, and facing to the north, is an upright concrete memorial tablet, on which are written in large script the Chinese characters Tjin Ju Tsai: "Respect the dead as if they are present". There are two other, smaller, inscriptions on this tablet. That to the right gives the date the shrine was erected: 'a lucky spring day in the third month of the thirteenth year of the reign of the Emperor Kuang Hsu (1874–1908), Ch'ing dynasty'. On the left the inscription reads: "Erected, with respect, by the Chinese community of Cooktown". In front of this tablet is a low concrete altar, on which food offerings were placed for the spirit of the departed. The platform is enclosed by a concrete edging and an ornate cast-iron railing. Beyond the northern end of the platform and approximately 2 metres (6 ft 7 in) away are two ceremonial fire-boxes, constructed of fire bricks rendered with cement. Each is approximately 1.2 cubic metres (42 cu ft) with a grate at the bottom. The open tops permitted paper prayers and temple "money" to be burned, assisting the spirits on their journey to a life beyond this world.

Northwest of the consecrated ground lie the graves of individuals such as the "Normanby Woman" and, in dense melaleuca scrub beyond this, the grave of Elizabeth Cooper, who drowned in the Endeavour River in August 1874, prior to the cemetery survey. Within this regrowth area is located a clay brick-pitched well, and beyond this a rectangular arrangement of shallow ditches, remnants of an irrigation channelling system purported to be of Chinese origin. The original cemetery survey indicated Chinese gardens adjacent to the Cemetery reserve, along Two-Mile Creek, but none within the reserve, so it is likely that if such a garden was established on the reserve, it was at some period after 1874.

== Heritage listing ==
Cooktown Cemetery was listed on the Queensland Heritage Register on 8 April 1997 having satisfied the following criteria.

The place is important in demonstrating the evolution or pattern of Queensland's history.

Cooktown Cemetery is important in illustrating the evolution of Queensland's history – in particular, the unique and multi-cultural history of Cooktown. The place has been in use as a cemetery since 1874, and the several thousand interments provide rare evidence of the diversity of national, ethnic and religious groups which shaped the development of Cooktown and district in the last quarter of the 19th century.

The place demonstrates rare, uncommon or endangered aspects of Queensland's cultural heritage.

Also, it is rare as the only identified Queensland cemetery in which a Chinese shrine is erected within the cemetery reserve. This shrine survives as an intact and in Queensland, rare, example of its type.

The place has potential to yield information that will contribute to an understanding of Queensland's history.

Cooktown Cemetery is a source of historical information which reveals details on the development of Cooktown and its multicultural society via archaeological investigation.

The place is important in demonstrating the principal characteristics of a particular class of cultural places.

Cooktown Cemetery survives as a good example of its type, with denominational divisions, Christian graves aligned to the east, and a variety of headstones and monuments illustrating changing public attitudes to commemoration of the dead.

The place is important because of its aesthetic significance.

Cooktown Cemetery is significant for its aesthetic qualities, which include the diversity and workmanship of the in situ monuments and cast iron railings, the hilly terrain and tropical vegetation as a backdrop to vistas both within and without the cemetery reserve, and the rustic cast-iron fencing along the front boundary. The Chinese shrine, with its simplicity of form and materials and its setting within a dense re-growth area, is of particular aesthetic significance.

The place has a strong or special association with a particular community or cultural group for social, cultural or spiritual reasons.

Cooktown Cemetery is associated with generations of Cooktown families and reflects aspects of the town's history. It is a tourist destination in Far North Queensland.

The place has a special association with the life or work of a particular person, group or organisation of importance in Queensland's history.

The place has a special association with several notable individuals and families who have contributed to the historical evolution of Cooktown and district and to the mythology associated with pioneering life and the late 19th century goldrush era.
