= Bakanambia =

Aboriginal Australian people

The Bakanambia, also known as the Wanbara, (Note: The variant Wambara is, according to Norman Tindale, an error.) are an Aboriginal group of Australia. Traditionally, the Bakanambia lived in the vicinity of Princess Charlotte Bay in the state of Queensland. One of the ethnonyms applied to them was Lama Lama, which is now used of a larger aggregation of remnants of several tribes.

== Country ==
The Bakanambia's lands covered the southern and eastern shores of Princess Charlotte Bay, and extended inland as far as the tidal limits of the Normanby and north Kennedy rivers, and included Lakefield. The coastal zone is swamp ridden and covered by mangroves, which means that the Bakanambia mainly lived along the aforementioned rivers. Their territory is estimated to have covered an area of around 1,100 square miles (2,800 km^{2}).

== Language ==
Bakanambia was a member of the Lama subgroup of north Queensland Pama–Nyungan languages. According to Norman Tindale, the Bakanambia suffered from a statistically high incidence of cleft palate, a factor which influenced their language.

== History of contact ==
The Bakanambia were one of the "mobs" (the others being the Kokowara and Mutumui) that attacked Edmund Kennedy's exploratory party as it passed through their territory. The principal informant for the language of the Princess Charlotte Bay area, as jotted down by a local resident, W. O. Hodginson and cited by Edward Micklethwaite Curr, and indexed as bearing on the Bakanambia by Norman Tindale, was a 10-year-old boy nicknamed Mal by the couple who kidnapped him. Curr notes the circumstances and adds that:

it is not at all an unusual circumstance in North Queensland for a boy of tender years to be seized by a White man, taken away from his tribe and country, and brought up ass a stockman or station hand, in which capacity his excellent sight and powers of tracking animals render him specially useful.

== Alternative names ==
- Wanbara
- Kokolamalama (exonym applied to them by more southern tribes)
- Lamalama
- Lamul-lamul
- Kokaoalamalma (either a corrupt reading or a typo)
- Mukinna
- Banambia
- Banambila

== Some words ==
- guarga (wild dog)
- parra (white man)

== Sources ==
- Dixon, Robert M. W. (2002). Australian Languages: Their Nature and Development. Vol. 1. Cambridge University Press. ISBN 978-0-521-47378-1.
- Hale, H. M.; Tindale, N.B. (1933). "Aborigines of Princess Charlotte Bay, North Queensland". Records of the South Australian Museum. 5 (1). Adelaide: 64–116.
- Hodginson, W. O. (1886). "Princess Charlotte's Bay, North Queensland" (PDF). In Curr, Edward Micklethwaite (ed.). The Australian race: its origin, languages, customs, place of landing in Australia and the routes by which it spread itself over the continent. Vol. 2. Melbourne: J. Ferres. pp. 389–391.
- Kerwin, Dale (2011). Aboriginal Dreaming Paths and Trading Routes: The Colonisation of the Australian Economic Landscape. Sussex Academic Press. ISBN 978-1-845-19529-8.
- Tindale, Norman (1974). Bakanambia(QLD). South Australian Museum.
- Trezise, Percy; Roughsey, Dick (1969). Quinkan Country. Adventures in search of aboriginal cave paintings in Cape York. Reed Australia.
