= Walmbaria =

Aboriginal Australian people

The Dingaal people, also known as Walmbarddha or Walmbaria, are an Aboriginal Australian people of Cape York Peninsula in northern Queensland.

Dingaal may be a clan name, and they may be related to the Guugu Yimithirr people.

== People and language names ==
A 2010 source reported that the Walmbaria represented themselves as Dingaal, and in land claims the Walmbaar Aboriginal Corporation defines the Dingaal they represent as adult people of the Dingaal clan or people or community having a Dingaal patrilineal descent, or who were adopted by such a person, A Dingaal father is someone who descends on their father's side from any of the Baru, Yoren, or Charlies families. A 2009 native title determination described the Dingaal people as a clan, which is passed down through patrilineal descent, "of the Baru, Yoren or Charlie families". As of April 2024 the Walmbaar Aboriginal Corporation is chaired by a Dingaal man called Kenneth McLean.

The website Dingaals Lizard Island states that the island has been in the custodianship of "Dingaal's Family", or "the Dingaal People", for thousands of years. As of April 2024 the senior elder of the Dingaals is Gordon Charlie. The Dingaals called the island "Dyiigurra", and the website mentions that "local Dingiil Aboriginal people have also been known to call the island Jiigurru". According to the Cairns Institute and Queensland Parks and Wildlife Service, the Dingaal people are the traditional owners of the Lizard Island group.

The Walmbaria name for their language was, according to Norman Tindale, (Note: There are problems with this. See Peter Sutton, who concludes that "languages in the area under consideration do not have names, at least not in the usual sense." Yalgawara/Yalgapara, Sutton argues, would actually be an exonym for a specific clan.) Yalgawara, which was spoken in two dialect versions, one for the mainland branch, the other for the islanders.

However, there has been confusion about which names apply to which people and languages in the area, and AIATSIS has reclassified a number of the languages in their AUSTLANG database:

Previously the AUSTLANG reference name for code Y61 was Flinders Island language; in contrast the Pathways Languages Thesaurus heading for this code was Walmbaria / Gambilmugu language and people.

Walmbaria is listed as a language by Oates (1970:201) and Tindale (1974:187) spoken on and near Flinders Island. It has the same referents as Walmbarddha Y147. Sutton indicates Walmbaria is based on a Flinders Island language term 'Aba Walmbarriya' referring to all (other) peoples of Princess Charlotte Bay but excluding Flinders Island people (1993:32).

Tindale and Hale (1933:69) wrote that Walmbaria people lived on Flinders Island and Bathurst Head and spoke Yalgawarra. Yalgawarra is not a language, it refers to a clan affiliated with Flinders Island language Y67 (Sutton, 1993:33).

According to AIATSIS, one people name is Walmbarddha (code Y147), and the other, Ama Ambilmungu. With regard to the latter, "Gambiilmugu is a Guugu Yimidhirr name for this same clan affiliated with the Barrow Point language Y63.1, i.e. Ama Ambilmungu (Y62) (Sutton, 1993:34). Previously, the Languages Thesaurus listed Gambilmugu as an alternate name for Walmbaria under the code Y61 (see also Y147)".

== Country ==
The Walmbaria's traditional lands are estimated to have encompassed approximately 50 square miles (130 km^{2}), extending over the reefs and Flinders island group north of Princess Charlotte Bay. Their southern limits were between a site called Alumukuan in Bathurst Bay and the eastern extremity of Charlotte Bay.

David Horton's 1996 representation of Tindale's map shows the lands of the Guugu Yimithirr people extending from south of Hope Vale to an area which covers Lizard Island, while Flinders Island is off the coast of the Mutumui people's land.

The Great Barrier Reef Marine Park Authority states on their website that the traditional lands of the Guugu Yimidhirr Warra Nation extend from Lizard Island to the Hopevale region.

== People and social organisation ==
The Walmbaria were divided into two main clans:

- The Wureimnu were principally islanders
- The Tartali. (Bathurst Head)

Their marriage laws were, by the time late ethnographers explored them, based on a two class system, consisting of:

- (A) Owaimini
- (B) Ungawu

Tindale in his later report states that the Walmbaria were essentially islanders who only came over to the continental mainland, at Bathurst Head and Cape Melville. "on sufferance."

The ritual extraction of a tooth (tooth avulsion) was practised on both sexes, with the removal of either the right or left upper incisor.

== History ==
The Walmbaria used to be "recruited" for work on luggers that worked the maritime resources of this area. Some Flinders Island men were involved in "the Wild Duck massacre", in which four European sailors were killed. Though the tribes are not named, one report from a crew member with Captain Blackwood who landed at a spot just south of Cape Melville in 1843 has provided a linguistic clue. He stated that several Aboriginal people there were surprised by the captain's dog, and yelling angooa. This word was taken to mean "dog", but analysis suggests that it was a form of a Barrow Point noun angwurr ("dog's bark"), and a Flinders Island verb nganggwoyi ('to bark'.) The logical surmise is that the Flinders and Barrow Point peoples shared the same areas.

By 1926 a survey found that the Walmbaria remnant which had managed to survive the incursions of white settlement numbered a mere 25, 10 of them male, the rest female, with no children known to exist, the youngest person encountered being 18 years old.

The last survivor of Flinders Island language-speaking Aba Agathi clan was Chinaman Gilbert.

== Material culture ==
The Flinders island Walmbaria and Bathurst Head women used two kinds of mallet for pulping food and breaking oyster shells. Their men manufactured a heavier and thicker ironwood mallet than the otun, similar to the drum gong used in Melanesia, though they also used the normal regional variety employed to this end by the Barungguan and Mutumui.

== Alternative names and spellings ==
- Walmbar
- Yalnga-bar (Yalnga = Cape Melville)
- Alei (saltwater, an Ongwara clan exonym)
