= Guugu-Nyiguudyi =

Indigenous Australian people

The Koko Njekodi (Guugu-Nyiguudyi) were an indigenous Australian people of Northern Queensland.

== Country ==
In Norman Tindale's calculations, the Kokonyekodi were assigned a territorial reach of some 400 square miles (1,000 km^{2}) around the area of the Starcke River, running northwest almost to Murdoch Point on the Coral Sea. Their southeastern limit was at Cape Flattery, and they were also present at Munburra.

== Alternative names ==
- Koko-negodi
- Bindjiwara
- Beengeewarra
- Gugu-Almur (?)

== Sources ==
- Hale, H. M.; Tindale, Norman (1898). "Aborigines of Princess Charlotte Bay, North Queensland". Records of the South Australian Museum. 5 (1): 64–116.
- Tindale, Norman Barnett (1974). "Kokonjekodi (QLD)". Aboriginal Tribes of Australia: Their Terrain, Environmental Controls, Distribution, Limits, and Proper Names. Australian National University Press.
