= Guugu Yimithirr people =

Indigenous Australian people of Queensland

Location of the Guugu Yimithirr people

The Guugu Yimithirr, also spelt Gugu Yimithirr and also known as Kokoimudji, are an Aboriginal Australian people of Far North Queensland, many of whom today live at Hopevale. Guugu Yimithirr is also the name of their language. They were both a coastal and inland people, the former clans referring to themselves as a "saltwater people".

== Country ==
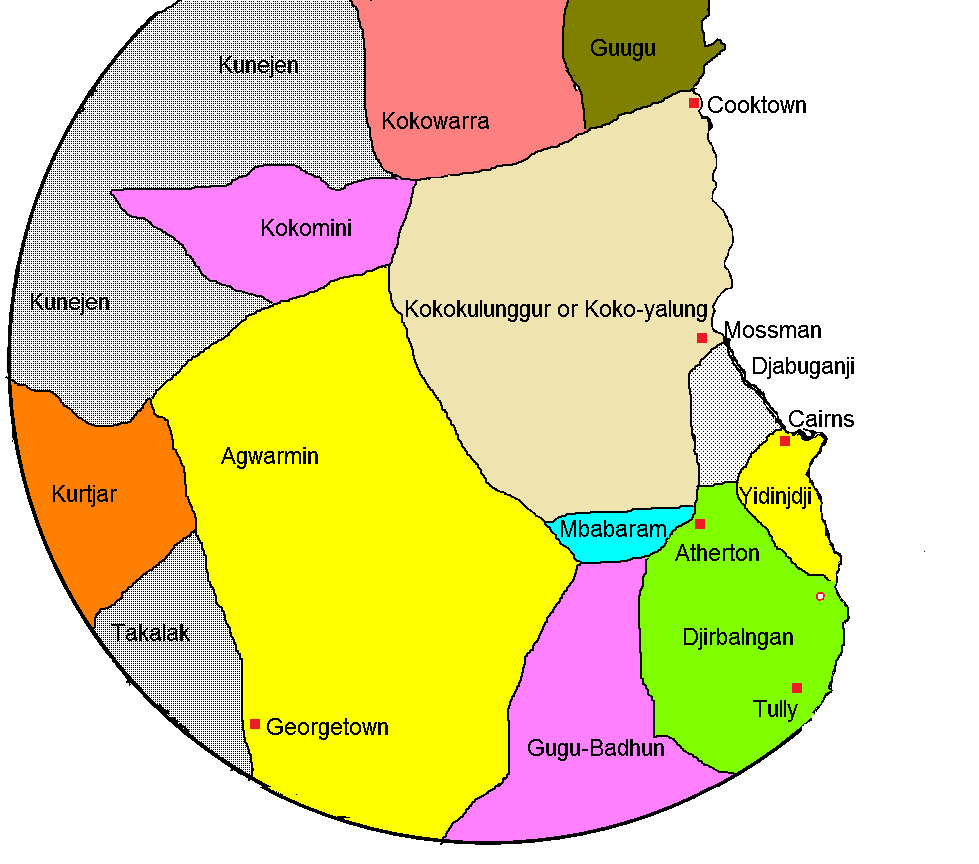
Traditional lands of the Aboriginal peoples around Cairns

The traditional territory of the Guugu Yimithirr speakers extended from the Endeavour River outlet inland, ranged as far north as the mouth of the Starcke river, or, according to Norman Tindale, to the southern vicinity of Cape Flattery. Westwards it reached the source of the Jack River and south to Battle Camp, north-west of Cooktown. Tindale assigned them, in his estimations, an overall domain extent of some 600 square miles (1,600 km^{2}). Dialects of the same language were spoken north of Cape Bedford and the McIvor River, and inland as far as the source of the Jack River.

David Horton's 1996 representation of Tindale's map shows the lands of the Guugu Yimithirr people extending from south of Hope Vale to an area which covers Lizard Island. The Great Barrier Reef Marine Park Authority states on their website that the traditional lands of the "Guugu Yimidhirr Warra Nation" extend from Lizard Island to the Hopevale region. The website "Dingaals Lizard Island" states that the island has been in the custodianship of the Dingaal people (possibly a clan name) for thousands of years. The Dingaals called the island "Dyiigurra", and the website mentions that "local Dingiil Aboriginal people have also been known to call the island Jiigurru". According to the Cairns Institute and Queensland Parks and Wildlife Service, the Dingaal people are the traditional owners of the Lizard Island group.

== Post-contact history ==
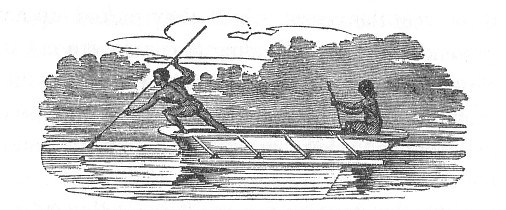
"Natives of Endeavour River in a canoe, fishing." From Phillip Parker King's Survey (1818)

Lt. James Cook anchored at the mouth of the Endeavour River at the site of modern Cooktown, on 11 June 1770 after their ship, the HM Bark Endeavour was damaged on a reef, and stayed in the area for seven weeks while repair work was done on the hull. Though the modern population was displaced and pushed 30 miles northwards, this was the traditional land of the Guugu Yimithirr. The expedition's members found them to be quite friendly, though they initially kept their distance. After a month, the Europeans were approached by five men, and an amicable relationship was established, as they were shown the Endeavour. The day after, things deteriorated quickly when, while visiting the Endeavour they found a catch of local turtles, and expected a share of the harvest, which Cook, already strained to feed his own, declined to do. He offered them bread, which they refused with disgust. Different concepts of hospitality and the rules of sharing clashed. Soon after, the natives set fire to grass in the bay, and in retaliation, some received injuries from shot.

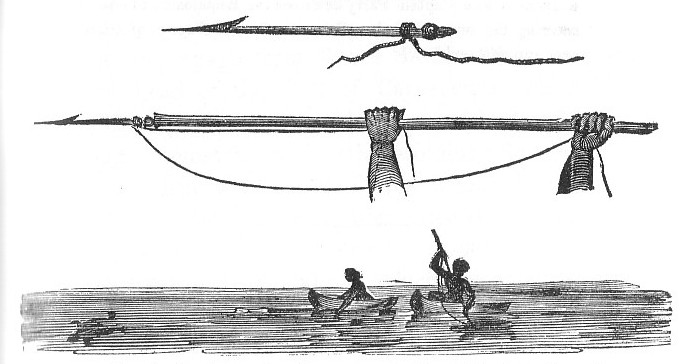
"Manner in which Natives of the East Coast strike turtle." From Phillip Parker King's Survey (1818)

One of the members of the crew, Joseph Banks's botanical draughtsman Sydney Parkinson, set down in his journal (published posthumously as A Journal of a Voyage to the South Seas) a sketch of the local people. He described them as diminutive and small boned, agile, their skin painted with red and white ochre, with wood-sooty skin and generally given to shaving their hair off. They practised nose piercing. Women wore a feather headdress. They used wood from the ficus riduola as a rasp to sharpen their spears, which were tipped with bone. Their languages was quite mellifluous, with clear enunciation.

Captain Cook left a few pigs on the land, and they bred quickly, to become a major local source of food.

The tribes of the area around Cooktown were decimated, the Guugu Yimithirr being "substantially exterminated", by a variety of factors: large-scale massacres, the kidnapping of women for rape and the abduction of their children, together with the lethal impact of consuming the opium that Chinese contractors paid to them for their work as hired labourers, and alcohol abuse.

On 20 February 1879 there were 28 Aboriginal men shot and drowned at Cape Bedford. Cooktown-based Native Police Sub-inspector Stanhope O'Connor with his troopers hunted down and trapped in a narrow gorge, a group of 28 Guugu-Yimidhirr men and 13 women. None of the men escaped: 24 were shot down on the beach, while four swam into the sea, never to be seen again.

In 1885 a curfew was imposed on them, disallowing their movement after dusk. In the same year, while delayed on his journey to Kaiser-Wilhelmsland (German New Guinea), the Lutheran missionary Johann Flierl founded the Elim Aboriginal Mission some 230 miles (370 km) to the north of Cooktown, at Cape Bedford, and the following year the governance of the mission was assumed by the G. H. Schwartz, who renamed it Hope Vale. He stayed on with his converted congregation right through to the Second World War, when the population was relocated inland from Rockhampton. Schwartz, who had been there since the age of 19 and who had forgotten to take naturalisation, had mastered the language, contributing greatly to the retention of traditional knowledge, was interned as an enemy alien at 74. The colder climate had serious consequences for the displaced congregation, and many died.

== Language ==
Guugu Yimidhirr, meaning 'language/speaking (guugu) 'this way' (yimi-thirr), was one of the earliest Australian languages to be recorded, since Sydney Parkinson took down a list of 200 words during Captain Cook's stop-over in the area in 1770. The major dialects are dhalun-dhirr, spoken on the coastal areas, and waguurr-ga, the inland vernacular. It is still spoken by approximately 200 people, and was listed by Peter Austin as one of the languages at immediate risk of extinction.

Guugu Yimithirr had several dialects: dhalan-dhirr ('with the sea'); wagurrr-ga ('of the outside'); guugu nyiiguudyi; guugu nyalaadyi; guugu yinaa and guugu diirrurru. Because they intermarried widely with tribes speaking other tongues, it was not unusual for Guugu Yimithirr people to be familiar with several languages.

=== The word kangaroo ===
Cook reported sighting on Sunday 24 June 1770 an animal which was:

of a light mouse Colour and the full size of a Grey Hound, and shaped in every respect like one, with a long tail, which it carried like a Grey hound; in short, I should have taken it for a wild dog but for its walking or running, in which it jumpd like a Hare or Deer.

Sir Joseph Banks entered into his journal that the natives called it a "Kangooroo". The animal was thereafter called by this name by Europeans after settlement began. When Captain Phillip King stopped over on the same coast in 1820, however, and made the same enquiry, he was told that the animal in question was called minnar/meenuah. There arose an urban legend that in fact what the word "kangaroo" must have meant, when the Indigenous people of the Endeavour River responded to the incomprehensible English query, was "I don't know". Light was shed on the point by the American anthropologist John Haviland, who studied the Guugu Yimithirr language intensively from 1971 onwards. He discovered that in fact a word like "kangaroo" did exist in Guugu Yimithirr, namely gangurru. This denoted however a species, the large grey kangaroo, (Note: Haviland in 1979 wrote that that gangurru denotes the 'black kangaroo'. Guugu Yimithirr distinguishes in everyday speech 10 varieties, the others being: gadaar (small wallaby); bawurr (rock wallaby); bibal (small scrub kangaroo); dyadyu (kangaroo rat); nharrgali (red kangaroo); ngurrumugu (large black kangaroo); walurr (female kangaroo); wudul (whip-tail kangaroo) and the dhulmbanu (grey wallaroo). In brother-in-law avoidance speech all 10 varieties were referred to by one word daarraalngan) that was relatively rare in the coastal territory, while the other word reported by King was an approximation to their word for meat or edible animal (minha). Cook's report and reputation as a precise observer was vindicated.

== Society and customs ==
Guugu Yimithirr practice certain forms of social avoidance. The language itself has a form of avoidance language in which, speaking in the presence of certain family members (like a man's father-in-law or brother-in-law), one must adopt a different vocabulary from that normally employed. In everyday conversation 'the man is going' is bama dhaday. In the presence of certain kin, this must be altered to yambaal bali. Speaking was totally forbidden in the presence of one's mother-in-law, one being obliged to sit, with bowed head, silently (guugu-mu).

The system of spatial coordination inscribed in the language is totally different from that in Western languages, where the reference system is relative with respect to the subject. In Guugu Yimidhirr, as in Kayardild, space is rendered in absolute terms, like the cardinal points, north, south, east, west, independent of whether something is in front of, behind, to the left or right of a person. The language thus provides them with a mental map, allowing quite a precise dead-reckoning of all points around them wherever they are. For example, if your Guugu Yimidhirr guest, on leaving your house, had to inform you he or she had left her tobacco behind, they would be required to state grammatically in their native language something like: I left it on the southern table in the western side of your house.

== Alternative names ==
- ?Boolcanara
- Gogo-Yimidjir
- Gug-Imudji
- Jimidir
- Kokojimidir
- Kokojimoji (southern pronunciation)
- Kokoyimidir (northern pronunciation)
- Kookcymma (typo)
- Kookoyuma

Source: Tindale 1974, p. 176

== Some words ==
- dhawuunh, 'friend'
- Ngayu mayi buda-nhu, 'I'm hungry' (lit. 'I want to eat food'(mayi) (Note: In one's brother-in-law's presence one would say this diffierently, in respect speech,Ngayu gudhubay bambanga-nhu. (Haviland 1979, p. 369))

== Sources ==
- "AIATSIS map of Indigenous Australia". AIATSIS. 14 May 2024.
- Austin, Peter K. (17 August 2008). "Peter K Austin's top 10 endangered languages". The Guardian.
- Coutts, Rob (2013). The Truth about Charlie. Boolarong Press. ISBN 978-1-922-10976-7.
- Deutscher, Guy (2016). Through the Language Glass: Why The World Looks Different In Other Languages. Random House. ISBN 978-1-446-49490-5.
- Dixon, R. M. W. (2011). Searching for Aboriginal Languages: Memoirs of a Field Worker. Cambridge University Press. ISBN 978-1-108-02504-1.
- Evans, Nicholas (2011). Dying Words: Endangered Languages and What They Have to Tell Us. John Wiley & Sons. ISBN 978-1-444-35961-9.
- Haviland, John B. (1979). "Guugu Yimidhirr Brother-in-Law Language". Language in Society. 8 (3): 365–393. doi:10.1017/S0047404500007600. JSTOR 4167091. S2CID 145287517.
- Haviland, John B. (1987) [First published 1979]. "How to talk to your brother-in-law in Guugu Yimithirr". In Shopen, Timothy (ed.). Languages and Their Speakers. University of Pennsylvania Press. pp. 161–239. ISBN 978-0-812-21250-1 – via Internet Archive.
- Kovecses, Zoltan (2006). Language, Mind, and Culture: A Practical Introduction. Oxford University Press. ISBN 978-0-199-77489-0.
- Ørsted-Jensen, Robert (2011). Frontier History Revisited: Colonial Queensland and the 'History War'. Lux Mundi. pp. 54–55 & 126. ISBN 9-7814-6638-6822.
- Parkinson, Sydney (2004) [First published 1773]. Parkinson, Stanfield (ed.). Parkinson's Journal. National Library of Australia.
- Regier, Terry (1996). The Human Semantic Potential: Spatial Language and Constrained Connectionism. MIT Press. ISBN 978-0-262-18173-0.
- Tindale, Norman Barnett (1974). "Kokoimudji (QLD)". Aboriginal Tribes of Australia: Their Terrain, Environmental Controls, Distribution, Limits, and Proper Names. Australian National University Press. ISBN 978-0-708-10741-6. Archived from the original on 3 March 2021.
- de Zwaan, J. D. (March 1969). "Two Studies in Gogo-Yimidjir". Oceania. 39 (3): 198–217. doi:10.1002/j.1834-4461.1969.tb01006.x. JSTOR 40329776.
