= Endeavour River =

River in Queensland, Australia

Endeavour Endeavours
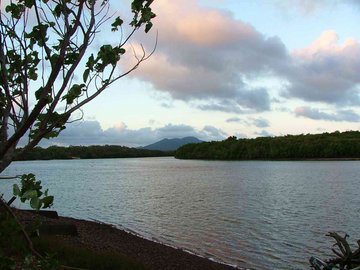
- Endeavour River at Marton, 2004

- Satellite image of the Endeavour River course marked in dark blue
- Etymology: HMS Endeavour
- Native name: Wabalumbaal (Guugu Yimidhirr)

Location
- Country: Australia
- State: Queensland
- Region: Far North Queensland

Physical characteristics
- Source: Endeavour River Right Branch
  - location: northwest of Hopevale
  - coordinates: 15°15′17″S 145°03′01″E
  - elevation: 327 m (1,073 ft)
- 2nd source: Endeavour River North Branch
  - location: below Honeysuckle Flat
  - coordinates: 15°20′50″S 145°06′11″E
  - elevation: 160 m (520 ft)
- 3rd source: Endeavour River South Branch
  - location: near Alderbury
  - coordinates: 15°25′25″S 144°54′54″E
  - elevation: 109 m (358 ft)
- Source confluence: Right Branch to from the Endeavour River
  - location: Endeavour River National Park
  - coordinates: 15°26′34″S 145°12′12″E
- Mouth: Coral Sea
  - location: Cooktown
  - coordinates: 15°27′23″S 145°14′59″E
  - elevation: 0 m (0 ft)
- Length: 140 km (87 mi)
- Basin size: 1,315 km^{2} (508 sq mi) to 958.6 km^{2} (370.1 sq mi)
- Discharge
  - location: Near mouth
  - average: 24 m^{3}/s (760 GL/a)

Basin features
- National park: Endeavour River National Park

The Endeavour River (Guugu Yimithirr: Wabalumbaal), inclusive of the Endeavour River Right Branch, the Endeavour River South Branch, and the Endeavour River North Branch, is a river system located on Cape York Peninsula in Far North Queensland, Australia.

== Course and features ==
The river system comprises three branches that are sourced by runoff from the Henderson and Audaer Ranges. The river flows generally east from the Great Dividing Range to the Coral Sea. The Right Branch of the river rises northwest of Hopevale at an elevation of 335 metres (1,099 ft) and flows generally south by east for 48 kilometres (30 mi) before reaching its confluence to join with the Endeavour River northwest of Cooktown, and west of the river mouth. The South Branch of the river rises near Alderbury at an elevation of 109 metres (358 ft) and flows generally east for 20 kilometres (12 mi) before forming confluence with the North Branch to form the Endeavour River. The North Branch of the river rises below Honeysuckle Flat at an elevation of 160 metres (520 ft) and flows generally west and then south for 20 kilometres (12 mi) before forming confluence with the South Branch to form the Endeavour River. Having been formed by the South and North Branches, the Endeavour River rises below Flaggy at an elevation of 39 metres (128 ft) and flows generally east towards its mouth with the Coral Sea at Cooktown, flowing through the Endeavour River National Park for the last few kilometres of its course. The Endeavour River has a catchment area of 1,315 square kilometres (508 sq mi).

In recent years, tilapia fish, which are considered an "invasive species" in Australia, have infested the river, causing concern that the stocks of native fish will suffer.

The river basin remains largely unmodified and the water quality is rated as good.

== History ==
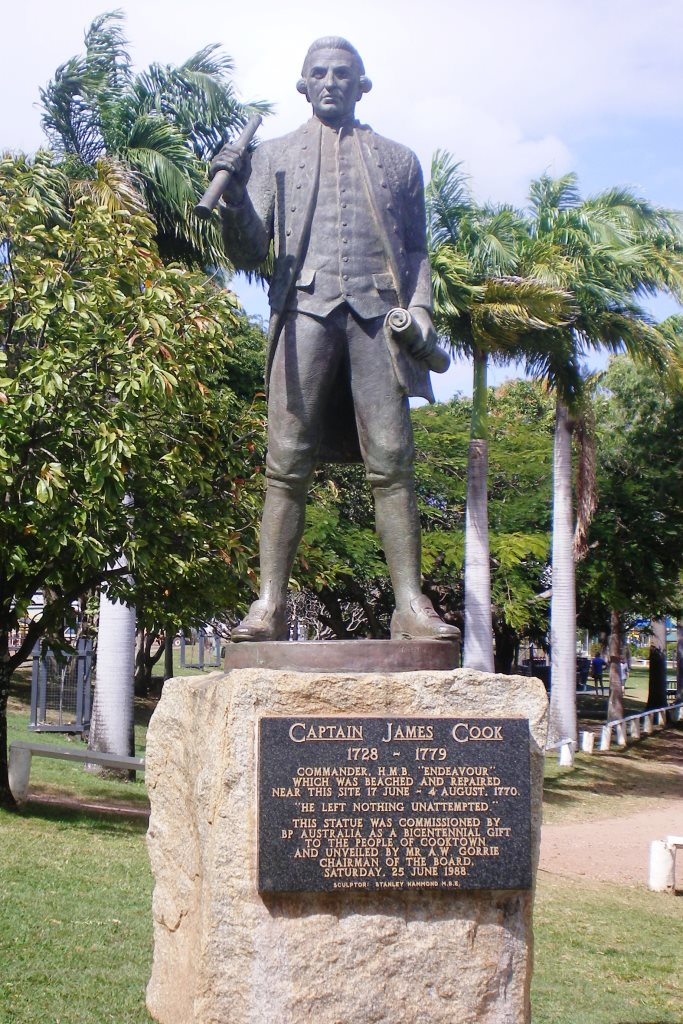
Captain James Cook Commander, H.M.B. Endeavour, which was beached and repaired near this site 17 June – 4 August 1770

James Cook named the river in 1770 after he was forced to beach his ship, HMS Endeavour, for repairs in the river mouth, after damaging it on Endeavour Reef. Joseph Banks named the river the Endeavours River but the form Cook used, Endeavour River, has stuck.

Cook and his crew remained for almost seven weeks and made contact with the local Guugu Yimithirr people. The naturalists Joseph Banks and Daniel Solander made extensive collections of native flora, while Sydney Parkinson illustrated much of the flora and fauna of the region. Botanical specimens were also collected by Allan Cunningham after he arrived on HMS Mermaid, captained by Philip Parker King on 28 June 1819.

Modern Cooktown which has a population of about 2,000, is located at the mouth of the Endeavour River. It is one of the northernmost towns on the east coast of Australia and was founded in 1873, around the site of Cook's landing, as a port to service the newly discovered Palmer River goldfields. Some of the relatively undisturbed natural features near the mouth of the river have been reserved in the Endeavour River National Park.

== See also ==
- List of rivers of Australia § Queensland
- Tilapia as exotic species

== Bibliography ==
- Captain Cook's Journal During the First Voyage Round the World at Project Gutenberg
