= Guugu Yimithirr language =

Australian Aboriginal language

Guugu Yimithirr
- Guugu Yimdhirr
- Pronunciation: [ˈkuːku ˈjɪmɪt̪ɪr]
- Native to: Australia
- Region: Hopevale, Queensland
- Ethnicity: Guugu Yimithirr, Koko Njekodi
- Native speakers: 810 (2021 census)
- Language family: Pama–Nyungan: Paman?; Yalanjic or Yimidhirr–Yalanji–Yidinic; Guugu Yimithirr
- Dialects: Dhalundhirr; Waguurrga; Nyiguudyi
- Writing system: Latin

Language codes
- ISO 639-3: kky
- Glottolog: gugu1255
- AIATSIS: Y82 Guugu Yimithirr, Y79 Guugu-Nyiguudyi
- ELP: Guugu-Yimidhirr
- Guugu Yimidhirr is classified as Vulnerable by the UNESCO Atlas of the World's Languages in Danger.

- Map showing the location of Hope Vale, where most speakers of Guugu Yimithirr reside
- Coordinates: 15°17′46″S 145°06′43″E

Guugu Yimithirr, also rendered Guugu Yimidhirr, Guguyimidjir, and many other spellings, is an Australian Aboriginal language, the traditional language of the Guugu Yimithirr people of Far North Queensland. It belongs to the Pama-Nyungan language family. Most of the speakers today live at the community of Hope Vale, about 46 kilometres (29 mi) from Cooktown. However, as of June 2020 only about half of the Guugu Yimithirr nation speak the language. As such, efforts are being made to teach it to children. Guugu Yimithirr is the source language of the word kangaroo (gangurru).

== Name ==
The word guugu means 'speech, language', while yimithirr (or yumuthirr) means yimi -having, yimi being the word for 'this'. The use of the word yi(mi), rather than some other word for "this", was seen as a distinctive feature of Guugu Yimithirr. The element guugu and the practice of naming based on some distinctive word is found in many other languages.

The name has many spelling variants, including Gogo-Yimidjir, Gugu-Yimidhirr, Gugu Yimithirr, Guugu Yimidhirr, Guguyimidjir (used by Ethnologue), Gugu Yimijir, Kukuyimidir, Koko Imudji, Koko Yimidir, Kuku Jimidir, Kuku Yimithirr, and Kuku Yimidhirr.

== Geographic distribution ==

Location of the Guugu Yimithirr people

The original territory of the Guugu Yimithirr tribe extended northwards to the mouth of the Jeannie River, where it was bordered by speakers of Guugu Nyiguudji; southwards to the Annan River, where it was bordered by speakers of Guugu Yalandji; to the west, it was bordered by speakers of a language called Guugu Warra (literally 'bad talk') or Lama-Lama. The modern town of Cooktown is located within Guugu Yimithirr territory.

As of the early 21st century, however, most Guugu Yimithirr speakers live at the mission at Hopevale.

=== Dialects ===
Guugu Yimithirr originally consisted of several dialects, although even the names of most have now been forgotten. Today, two main dialects are distinguished: the coastal dialect, called dhalundhirr 'with the sea', and the inland dialect, called waguurrga 'of the outside'. Missionaries used the coastal dialect to translate hymns and Bible stories, so some of its words now have religious associations that the inland equivalents lack. There was once also a Ngegudi or Gugu Nyiguudyi dialect, which is unattested.

== History ==
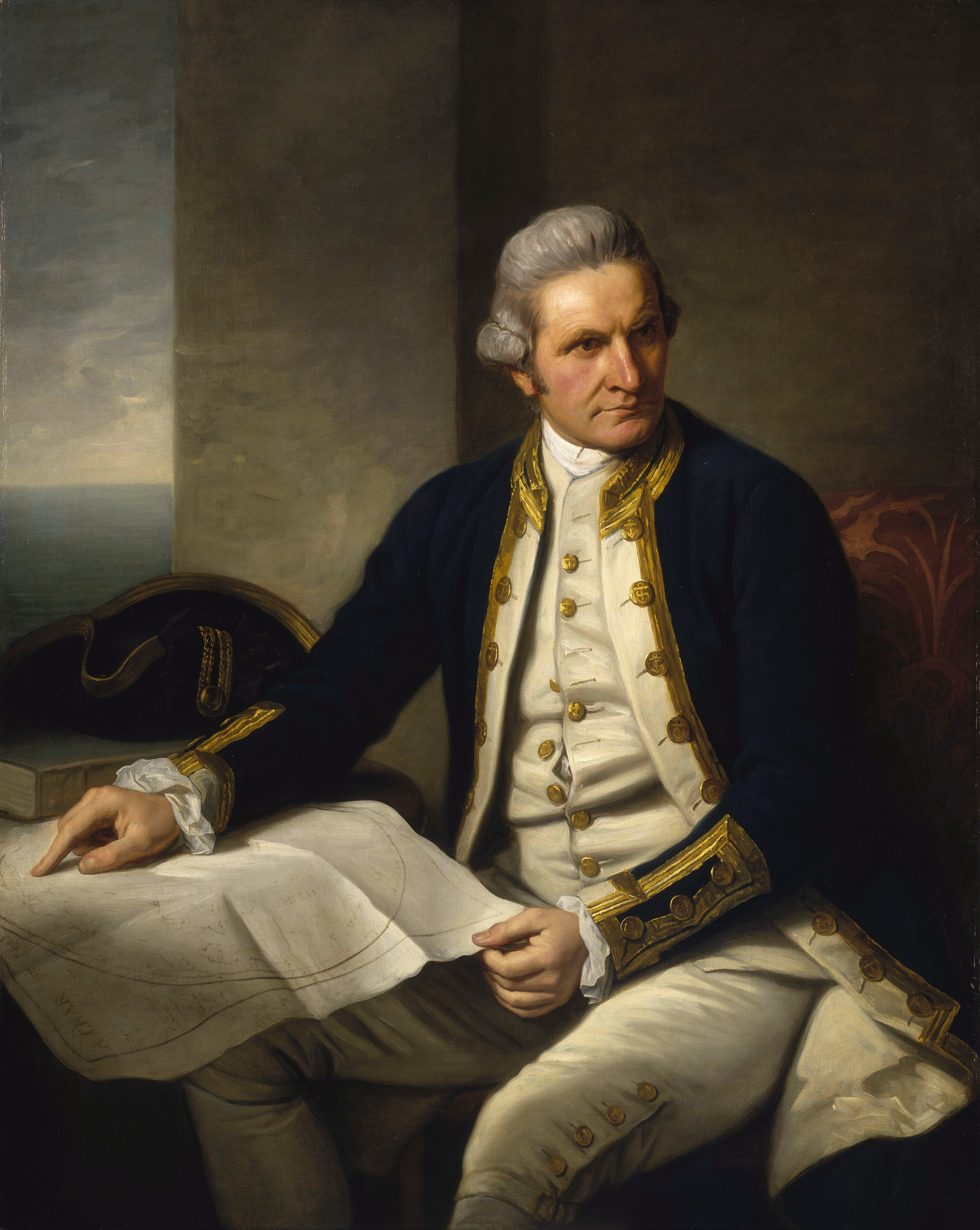
Captain James Cook

In 1770, Guugu Yimithirr became the first Australian Aboriginal language to be written down when Lieutenant (later Captain) James Cook and his crew recorded words while their ship, the HM Bark Endeavour, was being repaired after having run aground on a shoal of the Great Barrier Reef. Joseph Banks described the language as "totally different from that of the Islanders; it sounded more like English in its degree of harshness though it could not be called harsh neither [sic]".

Among the words recorded were kangooroo or kanguru (IPA: /ɡaŋuru/), meaning a large black or grey kangaroo, which would become the general English term for all kangaroos, and dhigul (transcribed by Banks as Je-Quoll), the name of the quoll.

Sydney Parkinson, who accompanied Cook, gave a useful word list in his posthumously published journal, A Journal of a Voyage to the South Seas.

== Phonology ==
=== Vowels ===
	Front		Central		Back	
	short	long	short	long	short	long
Close	i	iː			u	uː
Open			a	aː		

Short /u/ may be realised as unrounded [ɯ], and unstressed /a/ may be reduced to [ə].

=== Consonants ===
	Peripheral		Laminal		Apical	
	Bilabial	Velar	Palatal	Dental	Alveolar	Retroflex
Nasal	m	ŋ	ɲ	n̪	n	ɳ
Plosive	b	ɡ	ɟ	d̪	d	ɖ
Approximant	w		j		l	ɻ
Vibrant					ɾ	

- The plosives are usually voiceless and unaspirated, i.e. tenuis [p k c t̪ t ʈ] initially and after short vowels, and voiced after consonants and long vowels.
- [ɳ ɖ] may not be single phonemes, but clusters of /ɻd ɻn/. However, there is at least one word which, for older speakers, is pronounced with a word-initial retroflex: [ɖudaː ~ ɖuɖaː] 'run'.
- /ɾ/ is normally a tap [ɾ], but may be a trill [r] in emphatic speech.

=== Phonotactics ===
All words, with the exception of a couple of interjections, begin with one consonant. The consonant can be a stop, nasal, or semivowel (that is, /l r ɻ/ do not occur initially).

Words can end in either a vowel or a consonant. The allowed word-final consonants are /l r ɻ j n n̪/.

Within words, any consonant can occur, as well as clusters of up to three consonants, which cannot occur initially or finally.

== Grammar ==
Like many Australian languages, Guugu Yimithirr pronouns have accusative morphology while nouns have ergative morphology. That is, the subject of an intransitive verb has the same form as the subject of a transitive verb if the subject is a pronoun, but the same form as the object of a transitive verb otherwise.

Regardless of whether nouns or pronouns are used, the usual sentence order is subject–object–verb, although other word orders are possible.

The language is notable for its use of pure geographic directions (north, south, east, west) rather than egocentric directions (left, right, forward, backward), though such "purity" is disputed. Speakers of Guugu Yimithirr are claimed to have a highly developed memory of their environment and sense of direction, which has been cited for evidence of linguistic relativity.

== Preservation ==
As of June 2020, only about half of the 1,400 Guugu Yimithirr people speak the language, with mostly only grandparents being fluent speakers. Hope Vale elders are helping to create video tutorials on teaching Guugu Yimithirr, which are being uploaded to YouTube, while the local school, Hope Vale Cape York Aboriginal Australian Academy, has a language program in its curriculum. With the schools closed and learning being done in the home, using the online videos, during the COVID-19 pandemic in Australia, adults as well as younger siblings have been learning the language alongside the schoolchildren.

== Vocabulary ==
Some words from the Guugu Yimithirr language, as spelt and written by Guugu Yimithirr authors include:

- Balingga: echidna
- Birri: river
- Bubu: land
- Buurraay: water
- Gangurru: kangaroo
- Gulaan: possum
- Guuju: fish
- Jijirr: bird
- Munhu: grass
- Nanggurr: home/camp
- Ngalan: sun
- Thaarba: snake
- Wantharra nyundu? How are you?
