= Jeannie River =

River in Queensland, Australia

Jeannie
- Location of Jeannie river mouth in Queensland

Location
- Country: Australia
- State: Queensland
- Region: Far North Queensland, Cape York Peninsula

Physical characteristics
- Source: Great Dividing Range
  - location: northwest of Hope Vale and west of Starke
  - coordinates: 14°54′31″S 144°46′12″E
  - elevation: 230 m (750 ft)
- Mouth: Coral Sea
  - location: adjacent to Howick Island
  - coordinates: 14°39′30″S 144°55′26″E
  - elevation: 0 m (0 ft)
- Length: 43 km (27 mi)
- Basin size: 482.8 km^{2} (186.4 sq mi)
- Discharge
  - location: Near mouth
  - average: 9.4 m^{3}/s (300 GL/a)

Basin features
- National park: Cape Melville National Park

The Jeannie River is a river in Far North Queensland, Australia.

The headwaters of the river rise in the Great Dividing Range in the northern portion of the Cape York Peninsula in Kalpowar Aboriginal land northwest of Hope Vale and west of Starke. The river flows in a north easterly direction through mostly uninhabited country past Lagoon Prospect and then enters the Cape Melville National Park and eventually discharging into the Coral Sea almost adjacent to Howick Island. The river descends 230 metres (750 ft) over its 43-kilometre (27 mi) course.

The river has a catchment area of 3,638 square kilometres (1,405 sq mi) and takes in the wild rivers of the Jeannie, the Howick and Starke, of which an area of 175 square kilometres (68 sq mi) is composed of estuarine wetlands.

== See also ==
- List of rivers of Australia § Queensland
