= Barrow Point language =

Extinct Australian Aboriginal language

Barrow Point
- Mutumui
- Eibole
- Region: Queensland, Australia
- Ethnicity: Mutumui
- Extinct: by 2005, with the death of Urwunjin Roger Hart
- Language family: Pama–Nyungan: Paman; North Cape York; Wik; Yalanjic?; Barrow Point
- Dialects: Ongwara

Language codes
- ISO 639-3: bpt
- Glottolog: barr1247
- AIATSIS: Y63.1
- ELP: Barrow Point

The Barrow Point or Mutumui language, called Eibole, is an extinct Australian Aboriginal language from the Cape York Peninsula in Queensland. According to Wurm and Hattori (1981), there was one speaker left at the time. The people name Ama Ambilmungu is associated with the Barrow Point language.

== Name ==
The Eibole clan of the Mutumui resided at Barrow Point. This name was also used for the language the Mutumui spoke.

== Classification ==
The language has one dialect in the north called Ongwara.

== History ==
By the early 1920s, the Barrow Point people were being attacked by the police, settlers, and commercial fishermen looking for labourers. By World War II, most of them were dead, and the survivors were scattered across Queensland living in other Aboriginal communities.

== Phonology ==
Unusually among Australian languages, Barrow Point had at least two fricative phonemes, /ð/ and /ɣ/. They usually developed from *t̪ and *k, respectively, when preceded by a stressed long vowel, which then shortened.

== Vocabulary ==
gloss	Barrow Point
friend	anggatha
my friend	anggatha athu
story, news	yimpal
