= Juunju Daarrba Nhirrpan National Park (Cape York Peninsula Aboriginal Land) =

National park in Queensland, Australia

- IUCN category II (national park)
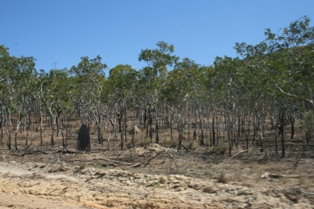
- Park bushland

- Location within Queensland
- Location: Queensland
- Nearest city: Cooktown
- Coordinates: 14°56′28″S 145°2′2″E
- Area: 80.39 km^{2} (31.04 sq mi)
- Established: 1977
- Governing body: Queensland Parks and Wildlife Service

Juunju Daarrba Nhirrpan National Park (Cape York Peninsula Aboriginal Land) is a national park in the Shire of Cook, Queensland, Australia. The national park was previously named Starcke National Park until it was renamed on 28 November 2013.

The national park is 1,619 km northwest of Brisbane and has an area of 8,039 hectares.

== See also ==
- Protected areas of Queensland
