= Howick Group National Park (Cape York Peninsula Aboriginal Land) =

National park of Queensland

- IUCN category II (national park)
- Location within Queensland
- Location: Queensland
- Coordinates: 14°30′0″S 144°58′10″E
- Area: 1.55 km^{2} (0.60 sq mi)
- Established: 1989
- Governing body: Queensland Parks and Wildlife Service

Howick Group National Park (Cape York Peninsula Aboriginal Land) is a national park in Queensland, Australia, 1,689 km northwest of Brisbane. The national park was previously named Howick Group National Park until it was renamed on 28 November 2013.

== Flora and fauna ==
The national park is known to have 152 endemic species of plants and 118 endemic species of animals, of which 15 are rare or endangered species.

== See also ==
- Protected areas of Queensland
