= Howick Island =

Island in Queensland, Australia

Howick
- Location within Queensland
- Etymology: Sir Charles Grey, Viscount Howick

Geography
- Location: Coral Sea
- Coordinates: 14°30′11″S 144°58′26″E
- Total islands: 19
- Major islands: Beanley Island; Bewick Island; Hampton Island; Ingram Island; Newton Island; Combe Island; Stapleton Island; South Barrow Island
- Area: 4.8 km^{2} (1.9 sq mi)
- Highest elevation: 56 m (184 ft)

Administration
- Australia
- State: Queensland

Demographics
- Population: 0

The Howick Island is the southernmost and a now uninhabited island in the Howick group that is part of the Great Barrier Reef Marine Park in Far North Queensland, Australia.

It fell within the territory of the Ithu people in pre-colonial times.

The island is located in the Coral Sea and is situated about 100 kilometres (62 mi) south-east of Cape Melville. The area of the island is approximately 480 hectares (1,200 acres).

== Etymology ==
The island group was named by Lieutenant Charles Jeffreys RN, captain of HMS Kangaroo, in 1815, possibly after Sir Charles Grey, Viscount Howick, a soldier.

Ion Idriess' first novel, Madman's Island, was published in 1927 and is semi-autobiographical based on the author's experiences on Howick Island.

== See also ==
- Protected areas of Queensland
- List of islands of Queensland
