= Transversotrema giganticum =

Scientific classification
- Kingdom: Animalia
- Phylum: Platyhelminthes
- Class: Trematoda
- Order: Plagiorchiida
- Family: Transversotrematidae
- Genus: Transversotrema
- Species: T. giganticum

Binomial name
- Transversotrema giganticum Hunter at al., 2010

Species of fluke

Transversotrema giganticum is a species of trematodes found in scarids on Heron Island and Lizard Island. It is characterised by its number of vitelline follicles enclosed by its cyclocoel and by the size of its testicle.
