= Transversotrema elegans =

Scientific classification
- Kingdom: Animalia
- Phylum: Platyhelminthes
- Class: Trematoda
- Order: Plagiorchiida
- Family: Transversotrematidae
- Genus: Transversotrema
- Species: T. elegans

Binomial name
- Transversotrema elegans Hunter at al., 2010

Species of fluke

Transversotrema elegans is a species of trematodes found from species of the labrid genus Choerodon on Heron Island and Lizard Island. It is characterised by its number of vitelline follicles enclosed by its cyclocoel and by the size of its testicle.
