= Eremiascincus phantasmus =

Conservation status
- Least Concern (IUCN 3.1)

Scientific classification
- Kingdom: Animalia
- Phylum: Chordata
- Class: Reptilia
- Order: Squamata
- Family: Scincidae
- Genus: Eremiascincus
- Species: E. phantasmus

Binomial name
- Eremiascincus phantasmus Mecke, Doughty, & Donnellan, 2013

Species of lizard

The ghost skink (Eremiascincus phantasmus) is a species of skink endemic to Australia.

== Description ==
The Eremiascincus genus of skinks is characterised by their nocturnal and fossorial habit. These adaptations lead to them mostly inhabiting ecosystems consisting of loose substrate such as sand dunes and sandy plains. It is a nocturnal forager, consuming mostly insects. Skinks of this genus are referred to as 'sand-swimmers' referring to their ability to move easily through sand.

Eremiascincus mostly feed on insects such as moths, termites, beetles, grasshoppers, and spiders but they also consume some small reptile species such as geckos or smaller skinks. They are crepuscular or nocturnal foragers, and forage on the surface of loose substrates.

E. phantasmus is oviparous with clutch sizes ranging from 2-7 eggs.

== Taxonomy ==
In 2013 Sven Mecke, Paul Doughty and Stephen Charles Donnellan examined variation in morphology of the Eremiascincus fasciolatus, providing clarification on four different species, and providing the description and clarification of diagnostic features for E. phantasmus as a distinct species.

Eric Worrell is thought to be the first author to use the colloquial name 'ghost skink' in 1963, in reference to Eremiascincus richardsonii. In 1974, Glen Milton Storr referred to an extremely pale form of E. fasciolatus located in the Lake Eyre region of north-eastern South Australia, followed by Allen Eddy Greer in 1979.

== Features ==
- Pale dorsal bands which graduate to being narrow faded bands on the tail. Bands are markings of contrasting colour that run perpendicular to the long-axis of the body. Usually 29-29 bands
- Medium to large size (snout to vent length is up to 92.5mm)
- Very glossy, smooth scales (except for granular and smooth scales that feature on hands and feet)
- Pale yellowish, brownish, whitish in colouration
- Faded lateral banded pattern on dorsal/back which graduates to be more well-defined on the tail
- The ventral/belly side is usually cream or pink coloured
- Small head
- Depressed snout
- Small circle-shaped ear opening
- Strong ridges in tail
- 5 digits and 5 toes
- scale characteristics: usually 8 undivided supralabials, 2 infralabials that are usually in broad contact with the postmental scale. At least 2 rows subdigital lamellae that are basally keeled. 12-18 plantar scales. 28-33 mid-body scale rows

Diagnostic features:

The pale dorsal coloration is usually the easiest and most distinguishable diagnostic feature. The only other skink that has similar faded colouring is the Eremiascincus pallidus which is smaller in size, lives in the western arid zone.

== Distribution ==
E. phantasmus is endemic to Australia, occurring in New South Wales, the Northern Territory, Queensland and South Australia. It is mostly found in low-elevation areas of the Lake Eyre Basin in north-eastern South Australia but also extending into the southern Northern Territory, south-western Queensland and western New South Wales.

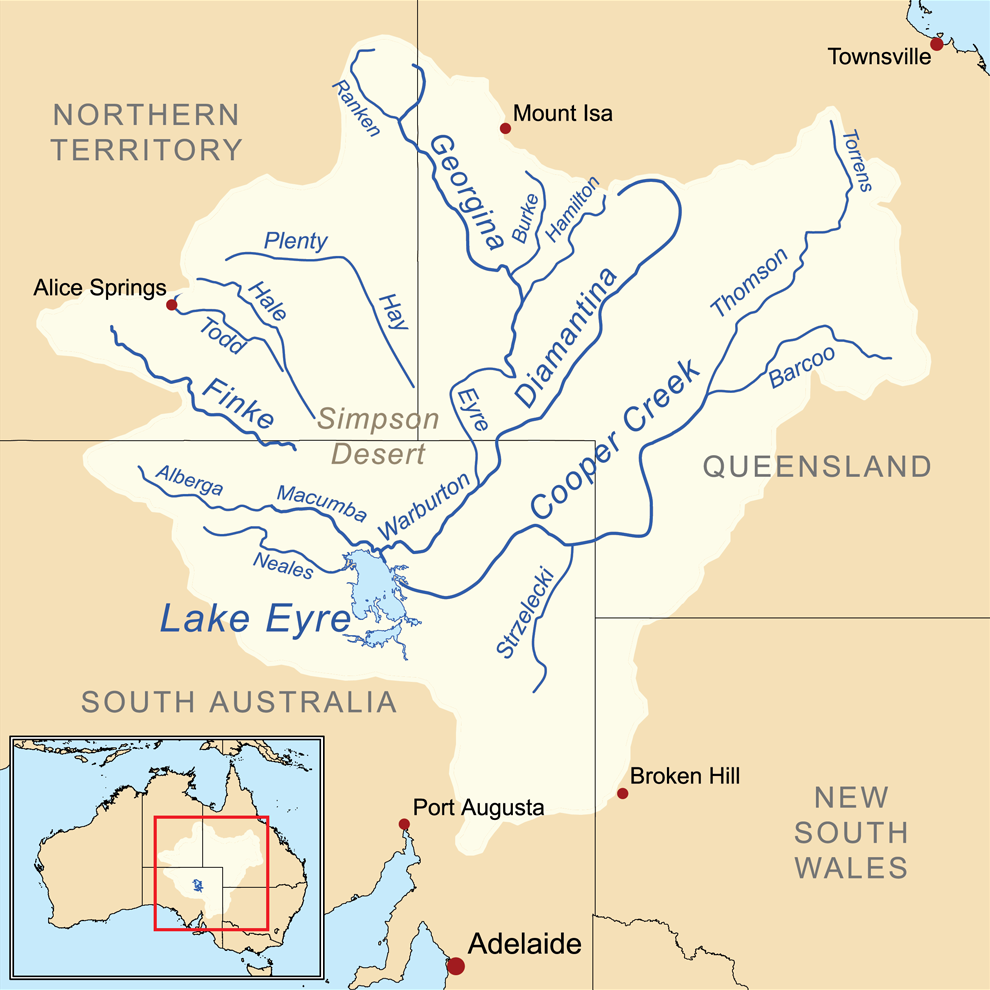
Approximate habitat distribution

== Threats/Predators ==
In June 2017, the International Union for Conservation of Nature and Natural Resources (IUCN) red list assessment classified the Eremiascincus phantasmus to the 'Least Concern' category. The justification for this is that it is a "widespread, common desert species and is subject to no threats".

General threats to reptiles include: habitat loss, habitat modification and habitat degradation, death on roads, and predation from feral animals including dogs, cats, pigs and foxes.

== Etymology ==
The specific epithet 'phantasmus' is Latin for 'ghost' and in the case of Eremiascincus phantasmus, refers to the faded "ghostly" visibility of its dorsal bands.
