= North Direction Island =

Australian island

- Interactive map of North Direction Island

Geography
- Location: Coral Sea
- Coordinates: 14.74528°S 145.51028°E
- Area: 0.51 km^{2} (0.20 sq mi)

Administration
- Australia
- State: Queensland

North Direction Island is an island in the offshore locality of Lizard in the Shire of Cook, Queensland, Australia.

It is 25 km north-east of Cape Flattery in the Great Barrier Reef Marine Park Authority and about 15 km south of Lizard Island. It is around 51 hectares or 0.51 square km in size.
