= Transversotrema espanola =

Scientific classification
- Kingdom: Animalia
- Phylum: Platyhelminthes
- Class: Trematoda
- Order: Plagiorchiida
- Family: Transversotrematidae
- Genus: Transversotrema
- Species: T. espanola

Binomial name
- Transversotrema espanola Hunter & Cribb, 2012

Species of fluke

Transversotrema espanola is a species of parasitic platyhelminthe found in lutjanines on Heron Island and Lizard Island.
