= Transversotrema manteri =

Scientific classification
- Kingdom: Animalia
- Phylum: Platyhelminthes
- Class: Trematoda
- Order: Plagiorchiida
- Family: Transversotrematidae
- Genus: Transversotrema
- Species: T. manteri

Binomial name
- Transversotrema manteri Hunter & Cribb, 2012

Species of fluke

Transversotrema manteri is a species of trematodes found in caesionines on Lizard Island and Ningaloo Reef.
