= Transversotrema lacerta =

Scientific classification
- Kingdom: Animalia
- Phylum: Platyhelminthes
- Class: Trematoda
- Order: Plagiorchiida
- Family: Transversotrematidae
- Genus: Transversotrema
- Species: T. lacerta

Binomial name
- Transversotrema lacerta Hunter at al., 2010

Species of fluke

Transversotrema lacerta is a species of trematodes found in haemulids on Heron Island and Lizard Island. It is characterised by its number of vitelline follicles enclosed by its cyclocoel and by the size of its testicle.
