= Transversotrema damsella =

Scientific classification
- Kingdom: Animalia
- Phylum: Platyhelminthes
- Class: Trematoda
- Order: Plagiorchiida
- Family: Transversotrematidae
- Genus: Transversotrema
- Species: T. damsella

Binomial name
- Transversotrema damsella Hunter & Cribb, 2012

Species of fluke

Transversotrema damsella is a species of parasitic flatworms found in pomacentrids, labrids and mugilids on Lizard Island.
