= Eagle Island (Queensland) =

Island in Queensland

Coordinates: 14°41′49″S 145°22′37″E

- Interactive map of Eagle Island

Geography
- Location: Coral Sea
- Area: 7 km^{2} (2.7 sq mi)

Administration
- Australia

Eagle Island is an island in the locality of Lizard in the Shire of Cook, Queensland, Australia. It is in the Lizard Island National Park, approximately 2,000 km north-west of Brisbane. The island is south-west of Lizard Island situated 270 km north of Cairns, Queensland.

== Geography ==
It is surrounded by the Eyrie Reef.

== Protected area ==
The Lizard Island National Park is administered by the Queensland Parks and Wildlife Service. Eagle Island is situated in the waters of the Great Barrier Reef Marine Park, administered jointly by the Great Barrier Reef Marine Park Authority and the Environmental Protection Agency.

== See also ==
- Protected areas of Queensland
