= Lizard, Queensland =

Lizard
- Suburb
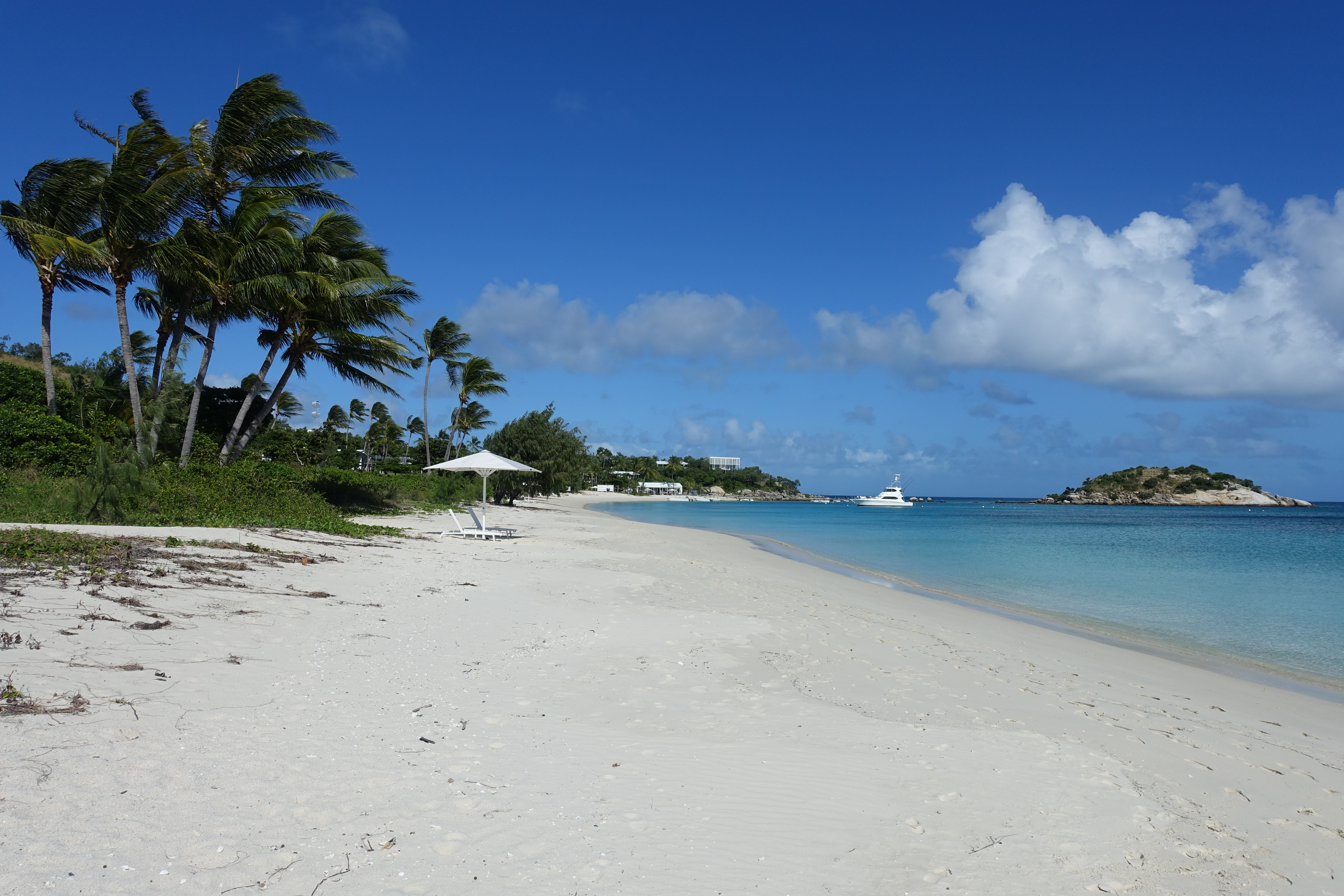
- Lizard Island beach with Prince Charles Island (right), 2018

- Interactive map of Lizard
- Coordinates: 14.7544°S 145.34°E
- Country: Australia
- State: Queensland
- LGA: Shire of Cook

Government
  - State electorate: Cook
  - Federal division: Leichhardt

Area
  - Total: 2,833.7 km^{2} (1,094.1 sq mi)

Population
  - Total: 65 (2021 census)
  - Density: 0.02294/km^{2} (0.0594/sq mi)
- Time zone: UTC+10:00 (AEST)
- Postcode: 4871
Suburbs around Lizard
| Starcke | Coral Sea | Coral Sea |
| Starcke | Lizard | Coral Sea |
| Hope Vale | Hope Vale | Coral Sea |

Lizard is an offshore locality consisting of a number of islands in the Great Barrier Reef area of the Coral Sea within the Shire of Cook, Queensland, Australia. It includes Lizard Island. In the 2021 census, Lizard had a population of 65 people.

== Geography ==
The locality consists of many island groups and islands. Being in the Great Barrier Reef area, there are many coral reefs with low-lying islands (known as coral cays) which can develop or erode over time. Consequently many are unnamed or poorly documented. The named features are listed in the table, from north to south.

| Name | Size | Coordinates | Notes |
|---|---|---|---|
| Nymph Island | 76.3396 hectares (188.639 acres) | 14.6543°S 145.2529°E | It is surrounded by the Nymph Reef. It is part of the Turtle Group National Park. |
| Prince Charles Island | 1.0756 hectares (2.658 acres) | 14.6666°S 145.4439°E | Also known as Osprey Island, it is just off the west coast of Lizard Island connected by the Lizard Island Reef. It is part of the Lizard Island National Park. |
| Lizard Island | 8.6287 square kilometres (3.3316 sq mi) | 14.6671°S 145.4606°E | Named on 12 August 1770 by Lieutenant James Cook, commander of HMS Endeavour, noting "...the only land animals we saw here were lizards". It is a continental island rising to 350 metres (1,150 ft) above sea level with the Lizard Island Reef. It is the largest island in the Lizard Island National Park. |
| Seabird Islet | approx 1.75 hectares (4.3 acres) | 14.6916°S 145.4658°E | A small continental island, covered in grass, shrubs and granite boulders. It is a nesting site for osprey, black-naped terns, bridled terns, silver gulls, Torres Strait Pigeons and reef herons. It is south of Lizard Head on Lizard Island and is part of the Lizard Island Reef and the Lizard Island National Park. It is the only named island in the Bird Islets. |
| Bird Islets | | 14.6922°S 145.4663°E | An island group south of Lizard Head on Lizard Island within the Lizard Island Reef. Its only named island is Seabird Islet. |
| Palfrey Island | 51.8023 hectares (128.006 acres) | 14.6926°S 145.4464°E | A continental island rising to 130 metres (430 ft) to south of Research Point on Lizard Island and part of the Lizard Island Reef and the Lizard Island National Park. |
| Eagle Island | 3.5178 hectares (8.693 acres) | 14.6968°S 145.3774°E | Within the Eyrie Reef, it was named by Lieutenant James Cook on HMS Endeavour on 13 August 1770. It is part of the Lizard Island National Park. |
| South Island | 28.6527 hectares (70.802 acres) | 14.7018°S 145.4544°E | Also known as Newt Island, it is a continental island rising to 110 metres (360 ft) south of Lizard Island. It is part of the Lizard Island Reef and the Island Island National Park. |
| Turtle Group | | 14.7227°S 145.1938°E | An island group consisting of a number of unnamed islands within the Turtle Group Reef. It is part of the Turtle Group National Park. |
| Pethebridge Islets | | 14.7338°S 145.0916°E | An island group consisting of two unnamed islands within the Pethebridge Islets Reef, formerly known as Q Reef or Kew Reef. It is part of the Turtle Group National Park. |
| North Direction Island | 48.1906 hectares (119.082 acres) | 14.7455°S 145.5115°E | Also known as Northern Direction Island, it is surrounded by the North Direction Reef. |
| South Direction Island | 55.2957 hectares (136.639 acres) | 14.8285°S 145.5249°E | It is surrounded by the South Direction Reef. |
| Rocky Islets | | 14.8625°S 145.4772°E | An island group of 3 unnamed islands joined by the Rocky Islets Reef. One of them rises to 30 metres (98 ft). The group is within the Three Islands Group National Park. |

There are three national parks within the locality:

- Lizard Island National Park
- Turtle Group National Park
- Three Islands Group National Park, which includes islands offshore of the neighbouring locality of Hope Vale

== History ==
The locality takes its name from Lizard Island, the largest island in the locality. The island was named on 12 August 1770 by Lieutenant James Cook, commander of HMS Endeavour, with the comment "...the only land animals we saw here were lizards".

== Heritage listings ==
Mrs Watson's Cottage on Lizard Island is listed on the Queensland Heritage Register.

== Demographics ==
In the 2016 census, Lizard had a population of 49 people.

In the 2021 census, Lizard had a population of 65 people.

== Education ==
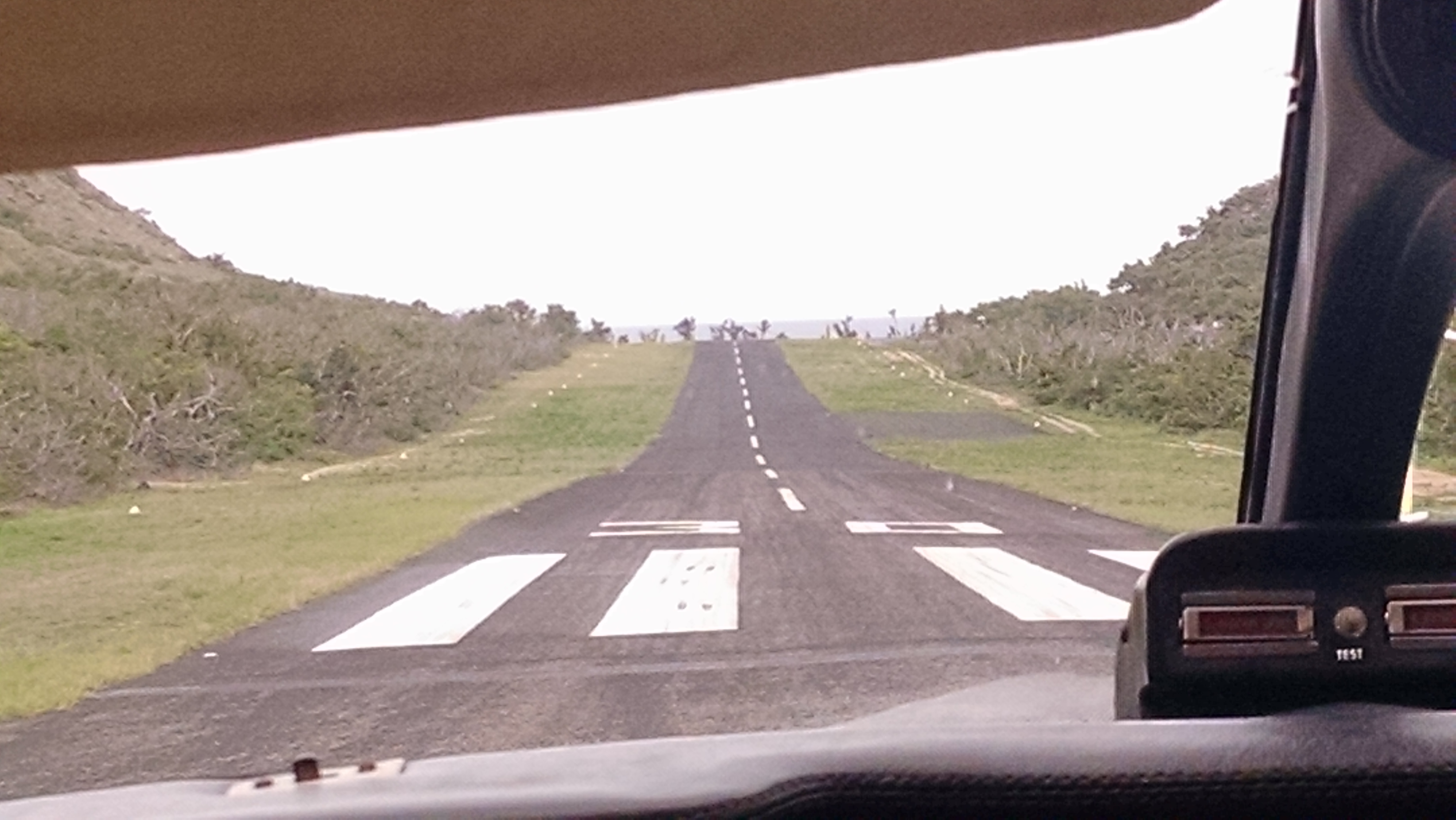
Lizard Island Airport, 2015

There are no schools in Lizard nor nearby. The options are distance education and boarding school.

== Transport ==
Lizard Island Airport is on Lizard Island (14.6712°S 145.4525°E).
