= South Direction Island =

Island in Queensland, Australia

- Interactive map of South Direction Island

Geography
- Location: Coral Sea
- Coordinates: 14.82889°S 145.52417°E
- Area: 0.49 km^{2} (0.19 sq mi)

Administration
- Australia
- State: Queensland

South Direction Island is an island in the offshore locality of Lizard in the Shire of Cook, Queensland, Australia. It is 25 km north-east of Cape Flattery in the Great Barrier Reef Marine Park Authority and about 25 km south of Lizard Island, Queensland, Australia.
