= Transversotrema cardinalis =

Scientific classification
- Kingdom: Animalia
- Phylum: Platyhelminthes
- Class: Trematoda
- Order: Plagiorchiida
- Family: Transversotrematidae
- Genus: Transversotrema
- Species: T. cardinalis

Binomial name
- Transversotrema cardinalis Hunter & Cribb, 2012

Species of fluke

Transversotrema cardinalis is a species of parasitic flatworms found in lutjanines and haemulids on Lizard Island.
