= Transversotrema borboleta =

Scientific classification
- Kingdom: Animalia
- Phylum: Platyhelminthes
- Class: Trematoda
- Order: Plagiorchiida
- Family: Transversotrematidae
- Genus: Transversotrema
- Species: T. borboleta

Binomial name
- Transversotrema borboleta Hunter & Cribb, 2012

Species of fluke

Transversotrema borboleta is a species of parasitic flatworms found in chaetodontids and lutjanines on Heron Island and Lizard Island. It might be in fact a species complex.
