= Transversotrema fusilieri =

Scientific classification
- Kingdom: Animalia
- Phylum: Platyhelminthes
- Class: Trematoda
- Order: Plagiorchiida
- Family: Transversotrematidae
- Genus: Transversotrema
- Species: T. fusilieri

Binomial name
- Transversotrema fusilieri Hunter & Cribb, 2012

Species of fluke

Transversotrema fusilieri is a species of trematodes found in caesionines on Lizard Island.
