= Transversotrema carmenae =

Scientific classification
- Kingdom: Animalia
- Phylum: Platyhelminthes
- Class: Trematoda
- Order: Plagiorchiida
- Family: Transversotrematidae
- Genus: Transversotrema
- Species: T. carmenae

Binomial name
- Transversotrema carmenae Hunter & Cribb, 2012

Species of fluke

Transversotrema carmenae is a species of parasitic platyhelminthe found in nemipterids on Lizard Island.
