= Transversotrema atkinsoni =

Scientific classification
- Kingdom: Animalia
- Phylum: Platyhelminthes
- Class: Trematoda
- Order: Plagiorchiida
- Family: Transversotrematidae
- Genus: Transversotrema
- Species: T. atkinsoni

Binomial name
- Transversotrema atkinsoni Hunter & Cribb, 2012

Species of fluke

Transversotrema atkinsoni is a species of parasitic flatworms found in nemipterids on Heron Island and Ningaloo Reef.
