= Rusty skink =

There are two species of skink named rusty skink:

- Madascincus macrolepis, endemic to Madagascar
- Eremiascincus rubiginosus, found in Western Australia
