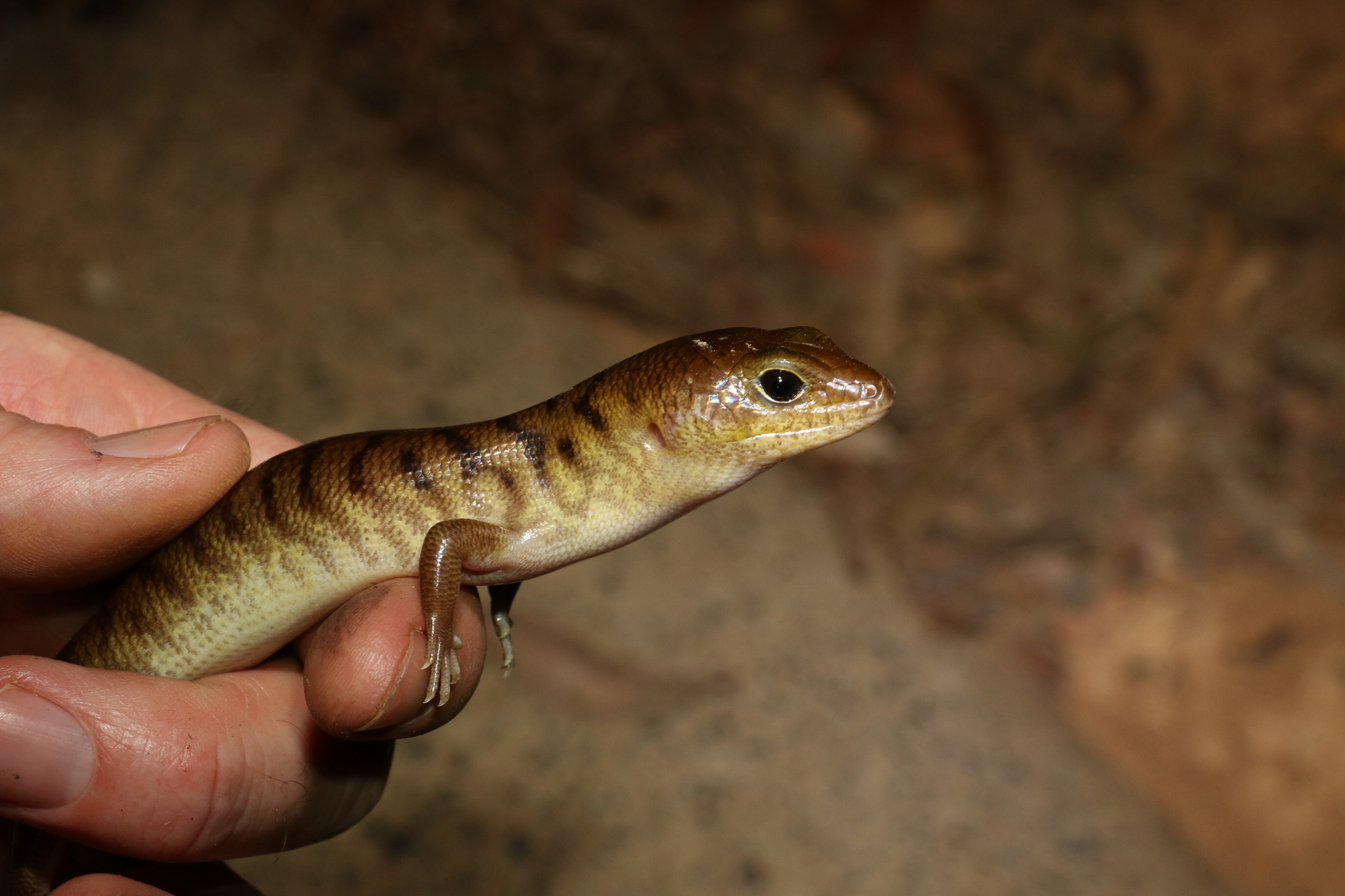

Conservation status
- Least Concern (IUCN 3.1)

Scientific classification
- Kingdom: Animalia
- Phylum: Chordata
- Class: Reptilia
- Order: Squamata
- Family: Scincidae
- Genus: Eremiascincus
- Species: E. fasciolatus

Binomial name
- Eremiascincus fasciolatus (Günther, 1867)

= Eremiascincus fasciolatus =

Species of lizard

The Eastern Narrow-banded sand-swimmer or thick-tailed skink (Eremiascincus fasciolatus) is a species of skink found throughout most of the arid and semi-arid interior of Australia.

== Etymology ==
The Scientific name ‘Eremiascincus’ is derived from the Greek word for desert (eremias) and the Latin word for lizard (scincus). The species name ‘fasciolatus’ is Latin for ‘small bands’. This gives the meaning of the name to be ‘Desert Lizard with small bands’.

== Taxonomy ==
Eremiascincus fasciolatus was first described by Günther (1867) from Port Curtis and Rockhampton in Queensland under the name Hinulia fasciolata. The distribution of E. fasciolatus in the Australian arid zone overlaps with similar species with similar morphology and is often mistaken for E. musivis (Mosaic desert skink) and E. richardsonii (Broad-banded sand-swimmer) and other species that has resulted in several synonyms including Sphenomorphus fasciolatus and Lygosoma (Sphenomorphus) fasciolatum.

== Description ==
Distribution of Eremiascincus fasciatus in Australia based on occurrence records from the Atlas of Living Australia.

E. fasciolatus has an SVL of up to 123mm and is a dull, usually pale yellowish brown to reddish brown with 10 – 16 narrow bands, no more than one scale wide on body, and 25 – 35 very narrow bands on original tail. The colour pattern consists of distinct narrow dark brown or black cross bands from base of neck to tail, belly is cream to pinkish. The major pattern variations consist of flecks on the head, neck and limbs. E. fasciolatus has a banded pattern, low dorsal ridges present on posterior of body and tail, one lower labial scale contacts postmental scale, usually 8 upper labial scales, with the last labial scale divided horizontally, and a row of subinfralabial scales present. As these species are so similar in general body pattern, morphology and size, E. fasciolatus cannot be distinguished from other sand-swimmer species by the main diagnostic characteristics or the number and width of caudal bands but with experience can be distinguished by a larger SVL and a more robust build.

== Distribution ==
E. fasciolatus occurs throughout most of the arid and semi-arid interior of Australia. It has been recorded from the Central Coast of Queensland, through south-western Queensland, western New South Wales, North-western Victoria and the Northern Territory to northern West Australia. It is largely absent from the northern, southern and eastern fringes of the continent, but may be present on the coastal plain in some parts of south-eastern Queensland.

== Habitat ==
E. fasciolatus can be found in a wide variety of arid and semi-arid habitats, from semiarid woodlands and heathlands to open subtropical forest. E. fasciolatus prefers loose sandy or loamy soils situated on dune crests with sparse spinifex (Triodia spp.) cover and is usually found by day sheltering in shallow burrows under logs, stones or leaf litter, they have been recorded in small burrows in a sandy hummock, in Great desert skink (Egernia kintorei) burrows and in rabbit burrows. E. fasciolatus is associated with areas that are characteristic of subhumid and humid conditions with and annual rainfall of ~600 – 1600mm.

== Behaviour ==
E. fasciolatus is crepuscular and nocturnal, favouring damp places, such as under logs during the day. They are a fossorial or semi fossorial species and when disturbed, will instantly burrow into the soil with snakelike movement that has earned it the nickname ‘sand-swimmer’. This form of locomotion in loose sand or soil occurs in a wide variety of unrelated desert lizards throughout the world. E. fasciolatus can travel extensively across its home range with James and Losos recording and adult traveling 525m in 22 days and 215m within 24hours. As a result of the extensive range of some individuals, it is not possible to get accurate population density data. E. fasciolatus are ectothermic and regulate their internal temperature by burrowing into the sand by day to avoid the heat and remaining active on the surface at night, with temperatures above 41.6°C proving to be fatal.

== Diet ==
Dietary composition appears broadly similar across sexes and age classes. Ontogenetic changes in prey choice are poorly documented, but the lack of taxonomic differences among age groups suggests that juveniles and adults consume similar types of invertebrates, likely varying mainly in prey size relative to body length. Individuals forage at dusk and at night, especially in damp microhabitats beneath logs or in deep shade. A strong skull and jaws of scincids such as E. fasciolatus help them crush the exoskeletons of hard-bodied arthropods and other prey items. E. fasciolatus are primarily insectivorous and feed on a large variety of small and large invertebrates. Their preferred diet is made up of mainly coleoptera, orthoptera, arachnids, ants and relatively large insect larvae, however, vertebrate prey (primarily lizards) also makes up a large portion of their diet due to prey mass, despite relatively few instances of carnivory being recorded.

== Lifecycle & Reproduction ==
Females have a slightly larger SVL than the males, with females averaging around 66mm (SVL) and males around 63mm (SVL), however males have a significantly longer jaw than females at maturity. This species is oviparous with the largest females laying clutches of up to eight shelled oviductal eggs. James and Losos research showed that average growth rates may allow some individuals to become sexually mature in their first summer (10 months of age). Females are reproductively active in spring and summer, becoming sexually active as early as September and can produce fertile eggs through to mid-February. Clutch size correlates with maternal body size with an average of 4 eggs per clutch.

== Threats ==
Predation by invasive species such as feral cats (Felis catus) and red foxes (Vulpes vulpes) may occur in fragmented landscapes, while altered fire regimes and climate change could reduce the availability of suitable microhabitats such as logs and stony substrates. However, the 2018 IUCN assessment reports no major threats and suggests the population is stable and maintained the Least Concern status.

Reptiles are especially vulnerable to habitat loss and degradation as they often have limited ability to disperse, may be morphologically specialised to specific substrate types, typically occupy small home ranges, and are limited by thermoregulatory constraints.

Southern populations of E. fasciolatus, some of which may already be extinct, occur in a region with high population density and rapid growth. In several subregions, extensive clearing and development for urban areas, infrastructure, and agriculture have reduced and fragmented woodland ecosystems, placing them under ongoing pressure. Wilson reported that Eremiascincus sp. are uncommon in the South-East Queensland bioregion and suggested that only E. richardsonii occurs in its drier parts, however, voucher specimens show that E. fasciolatus was present at some point, with records from Purga, Laidley, and Gatton collected between 1974 and 1981.
