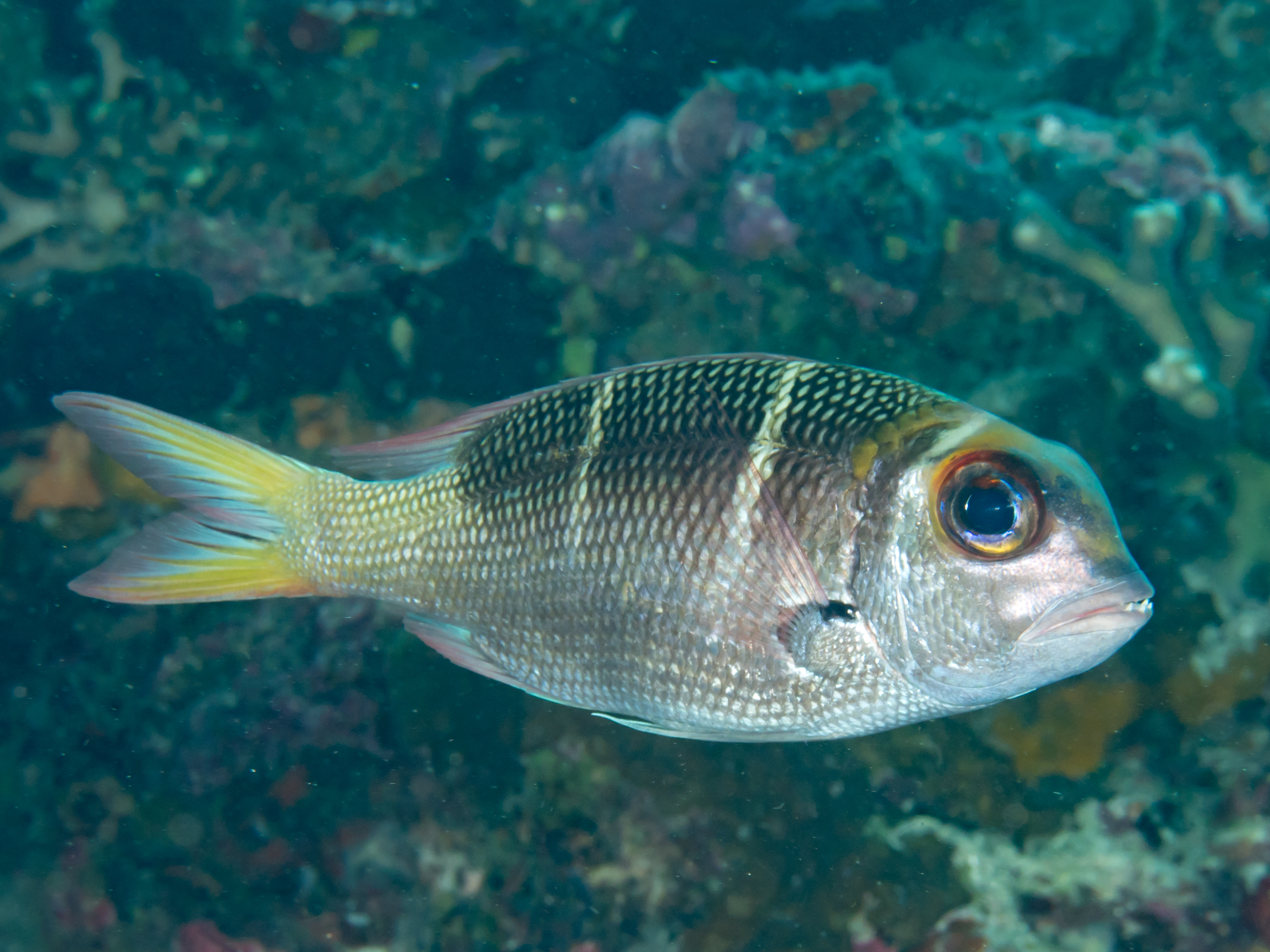

Conservation status
- Least Concern (IUCN 3.1)

Scientific classification
- Kingdom: Animalia
- Phylum: Chordata
- Class: Actinopterygii
- Order: Acanthuriformes
- Family: Lethrinidae
- Genus: Monotaxis
- Species: M. heterodon

Binomial name
- Monotaxis heterodon (Bleeker, 1854)

Synonyms
- Pagrus heterodon Bleeker, 1854

= Monotaxis heterodon =

Species of fish

Monotaxis heterodon, the redfin emperor, is a species of marine ray-finned fish belonging to the family Lethrinidae, the emperors and emperor breams. This fish is found in the Indian and Western Pacific Oceans.

== Taxonomy ==
Monotaxis heterodon was first formally described as Pagrus heterodon in 1854 by the Dutch physician, herpetologist and ichthyologist Pieter Bleeker with its type locality given as Halmahera in Indonesia. This taxon was regarded as a synonym of Monotaxis grandoculis but is now considered to be a valid species. Some authors place the genus Monotaxis in the subfamily Monotaxinae but the 5th edition of Fishes of the World does not recognise the subfamilies traditionally accepted within the family Lethrinidae as valid. The family Lethrinidae is classified by the 5th edition of Fishes of the World as belonging to the order Spariformes.

== Etymology ==
Monotaxis heterodon has the specific name heterodon which means "different teeth" which was an allusion to the single row of molar teeth compared to the 2 or 3 rows of Pagrus, the genus Bleeker placed it in.

== Description ==
Monotaxis heterodon differs from M. grandoculis, with which it used to be considered synonymous, by having 18 rather than 19 transverse scale rows on the cheek. This species also has thin, vertical white bars along the upper body and the juveniles differ in having no vertical bar through the eye and no black blotches. It is an overall sovery greyish colour on the body, broken by the thin white vertical bars along the back, these are only one or two scale rows wide (3-4 on M. grandocularis). There is a black blotch on the axil, of the pectoral fin, the lips are brownish to reddish and the fins are tinged with yellowish to reddish.

== Distribution and habitat ==
Monotaxis heterodon occurs in the Indian and Pacific Oceans. In the Indian Ocean it occurs at the Seychelles, Maldives and Sri lanka, as well as Christmas Island and the Cocos (Keeling) Islands. It is found throughout the islands of Indonesia east into the Pacific Ocean where it occurs east to Fiji, south to the Great Barrier Reef, Lord Howe Island and New Caledonia. This species is found on sheltered coral reefs down to 25 m (82 ft).
