= Transversotrema witenbergi =

Scientific classification
- Kingdom: Animalia
- Phylum: Platyhelminthes
- Class: Trematoda
- Order: Plagiorchiida
- Family: Transversotrematidae
- Genus: Transversotrema
- Species: T. witenbergi

Binomial name
- Transversotrema witenbergi Hunter & Cribb, 2012

Species of fluke

Transversotrema witenbergi is a species of trematodes found in caesionines on Heron Island.
