= Eremiascincus intermedius =

Conservation status
- Least Concern (IUCN 3.1)

Scientific classification
- Kingdom: Animalia
- Phylum: Chordata
- Class: Reptilia
- Order: Squamata
- Suborder: Scinciformata
- Infraorder: Scincomorpha
- Family: Sphenomorphidae
- Genus: Eremiascincus
- Species: E. intermedius

Binomial name
- Eremiascincus intermedius (Sternfeld, 1919)

Species of lizard

The northern narrow–banded skink (Eremiascincus intermedius) is a species of skink found in the Northern Territory and Western Australia.
