= Eremiascincus butlerorum =

Conservation status
- Endangered (IUCN 3.1)

Scientific classification
- Kingdom: Animalia
- Phylum: Chordata
- Class: Reptilia
- Order: Squamata
- Family: Scincidae
- Genus: Eremiascincus
- Species: E. butlerorum

Binomial name
- Eremiascincus butlerorum (Aplin, How & Boeadi, 1993)

Synonyms
- Glaphyromorphus butlerorum Aplin, How & Boeadi, 1993; Eremiascincus butlerorum — Mecke, Doughty & Donnellan, 2009

Species of lizard

Eremiascincus butlerorum is a species of lizard in the subfamily Sphenomorphinae of the family Scincidae (skinks). The species is endemic to the island of Sumba in Indonesia.

== Etymology ==
The specific name, butlerorum (Latin, genitive plural), is in honor of Australian naturalist William Henry "Harry" Butler and his wife Margaret Butler.

== Habitat ==
The preferred natural habitat of E. butlerorum is forest, but the species has also been found in gardens.

== Reproduction ==
E. butlerorum is oviparous.
