= Eremiascincus antoniorum =

Scientific classification
- Kingdom: Animalia
- Phylum: Chordata
- Class: Reptilia
- Order: Squamata
- Family: Scincidae
- Genus: Eremiascincus
- Species: E. antoniorum

Binomial name
- Eremiascincus antoniorum (M.A. Smith, 1927)

Synonyms
- Lygosoma antoniorum M.A. Smith, 1927; Sphenomorphus antoniorum — Greer, 1990; Glaphyromorphus antoniorum — Greer, 1990; Eremiascincus antoniorum — Mecke, Doughty & Donnellan, 2009

Species of lizard

Eremiascincus antoniorum is a species of skink, a lizard in the family Scincidae. The species is endemic to Timor.

== Etymology ==
The specific name, antoniorum, is in honor of the indigenous people of the island of Timor, who call themselves "the Antoni".

== Reproduction ==
E. antoniorum is oviparous.
