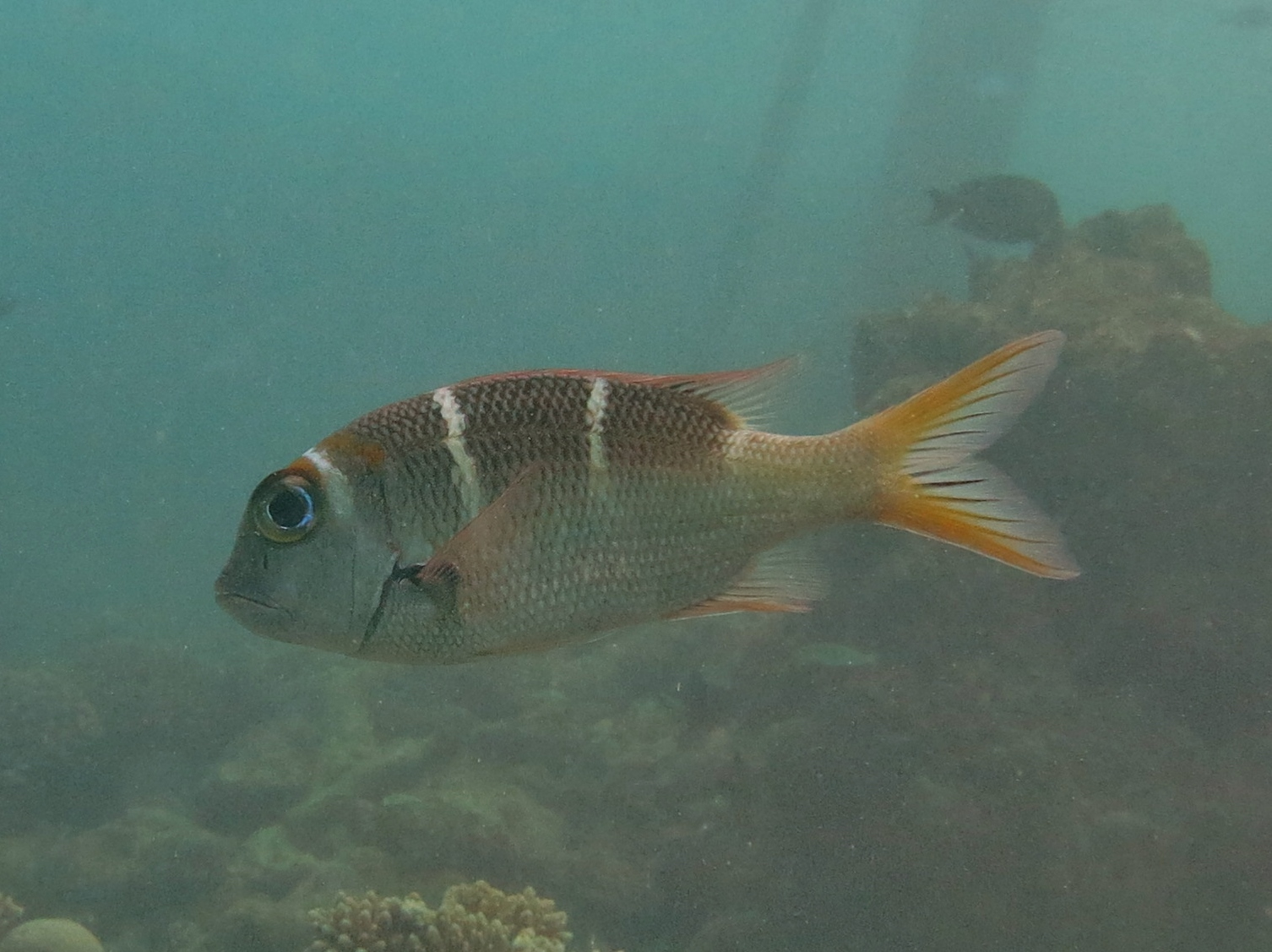
- Redfin bream (Monotaxis heterodon)

Scientific classification
- Kingdom: Animalia
- Phylum: Chordata
- Class: Actinopterygii
- Order: Acanthuriformes
- Family: Lethrinidae
- Genus: Monotaxis; Anonymous [Bennett], 1830

Type species
- Monotaxis indica Anonymous [Bennett], 1830

Synonyms
- Sphaerodon Rüppell, 1838

= Monotaxis (fish) =

Genus of fishes

Monotaxis is a small genus of marine ray-finned fishes belonging to the family Lethrinidae, the emperors and emperor breams. The fishes in this genus are found in the Indian and western Pacific Oceans.

== Taxonomy ==
Monotaxis was first proposed as a genus in 1830 by the author of the section on zoological specimens in the Memoir of the life and public services of Sir Thomas Stamford Raffles when that author described Monotaxis indica from Sumatra. The author of that section was thought to be Edward Turner Bennett, although no evidence has been found to confirm that, so the author is given as anonymous with Bennett placed in square brackets. Some authors place this genus in the subfamily Monotaxinae but the 5th edition of Fishes of the World does not recognise the subfamilies traditionally accepted within the family Lethrinidae as valid. The family Lethrinidae is classified by the 5th edition of Fishes of the World as belonging to the order Spariformes.

== Etymology ==
Monotaxis compounds mono, meaning "one". and taxis, which means "series", an allusion to single series of molar-like teeth on the sides of the jaws.

== Species ==
There are two recognized species in the genus Monotaxis:

- Monotaxis grandoculis (Forsskål, 1775) (Humpnose big-eye bream)
- Monotaxis heterodon (Bleeker, 1854) (Redfin bream)

== Characteristics ==
Monotaxis breams are characterised by having the dorsal fin supported by 10 spines and 10 soft rays while their anal fins are supported by 3 spines and 9 soft rays and there are 14 fin rays in their pectoral fins. They have transverse rows of scales on the cheeks and the axilla of the pectoral fin is densely scaled. There are round, flat molar-like teeth in the sides of the jaws and the maxilla has a horizontal serrated ridge along its outer surface.

== Distribution and habitat ==
Monotaxis breams have a wide Indo-Pacific distribution, ranging from the eastern coast of Africa from the Red Sea south to South Africa and east to the Hawaiian Islands, south to Australia and north to Japan. They are usually found near coral reefs over areas of sand and rubble at depths between 3 and 150 m (9.8 and 492.1 ft).

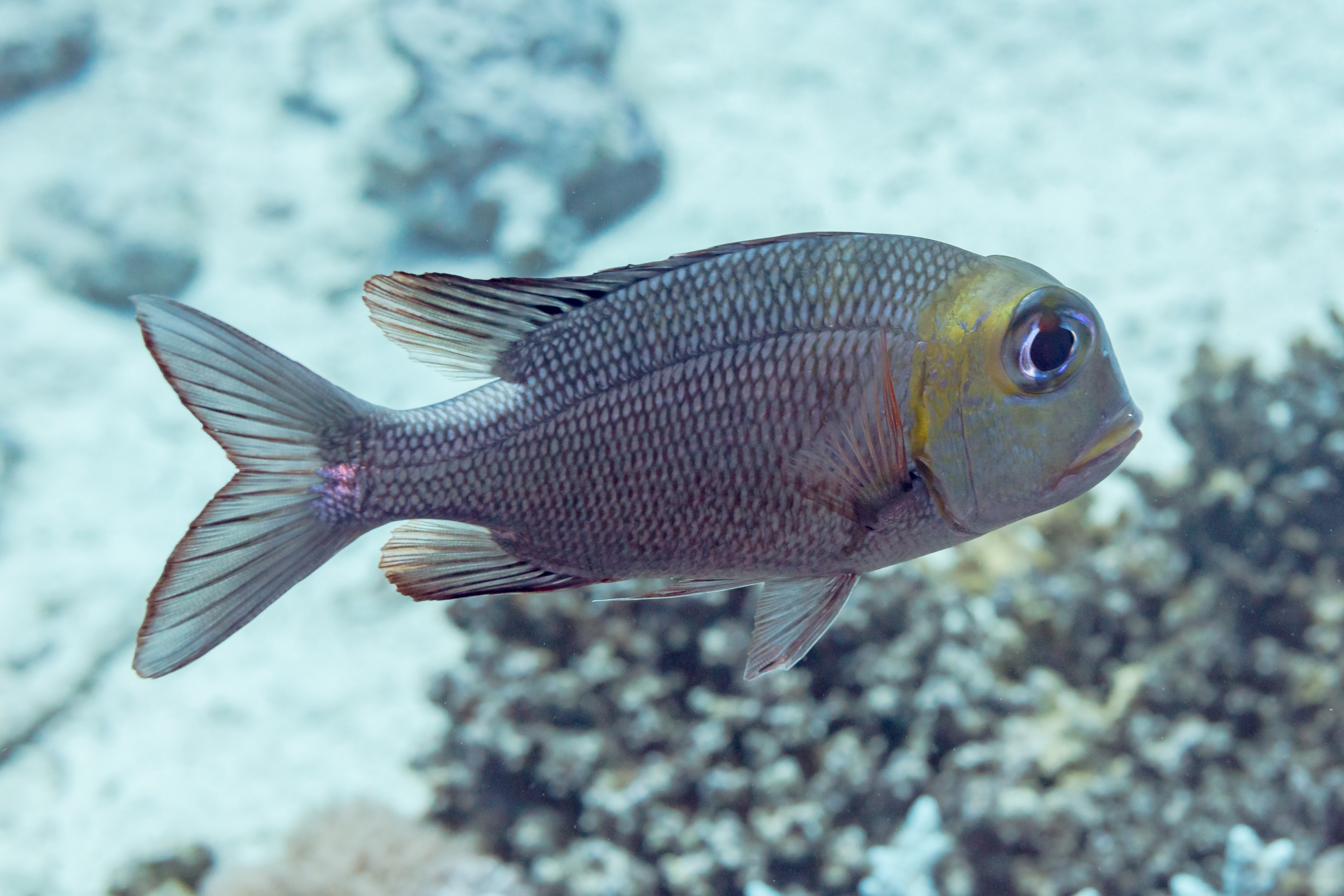
Monotaxis grandoculis

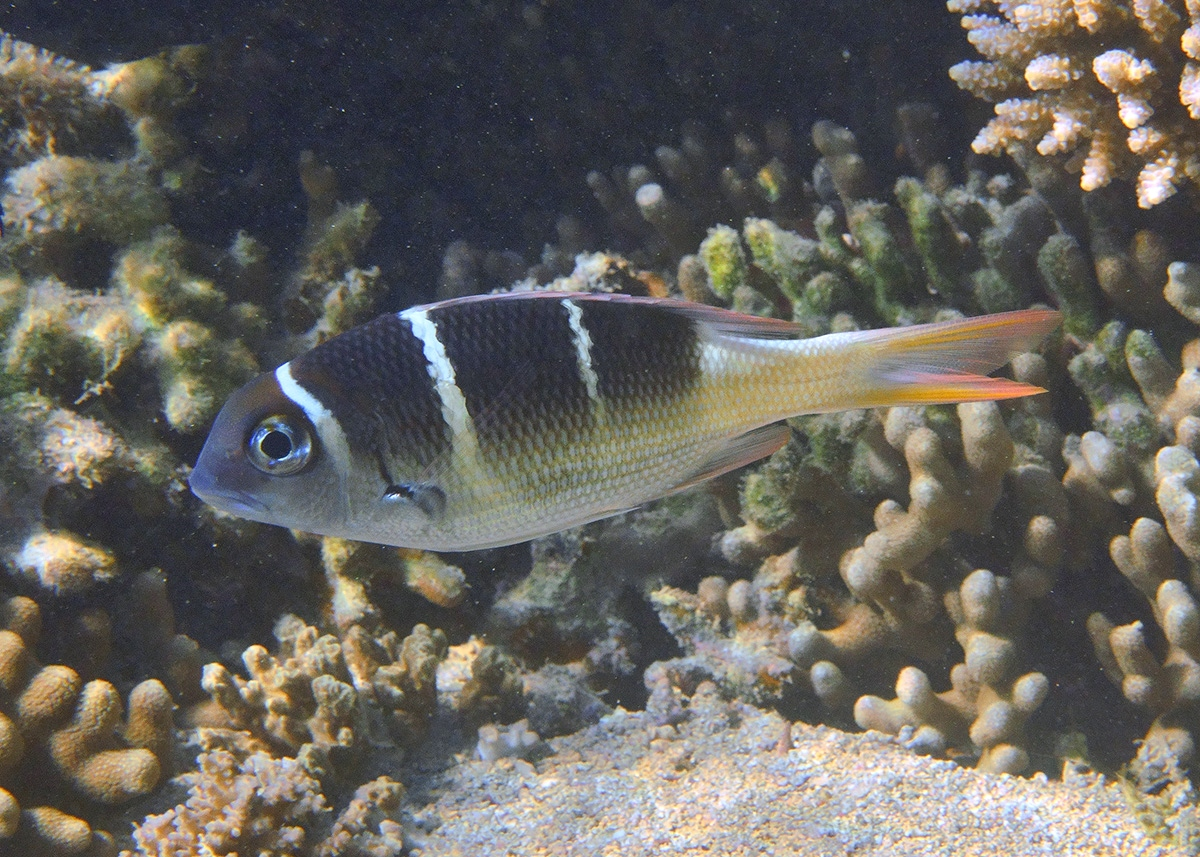
Monotaxis heterodon
