= Coral Adventurer =

Cruise ship built in 2019

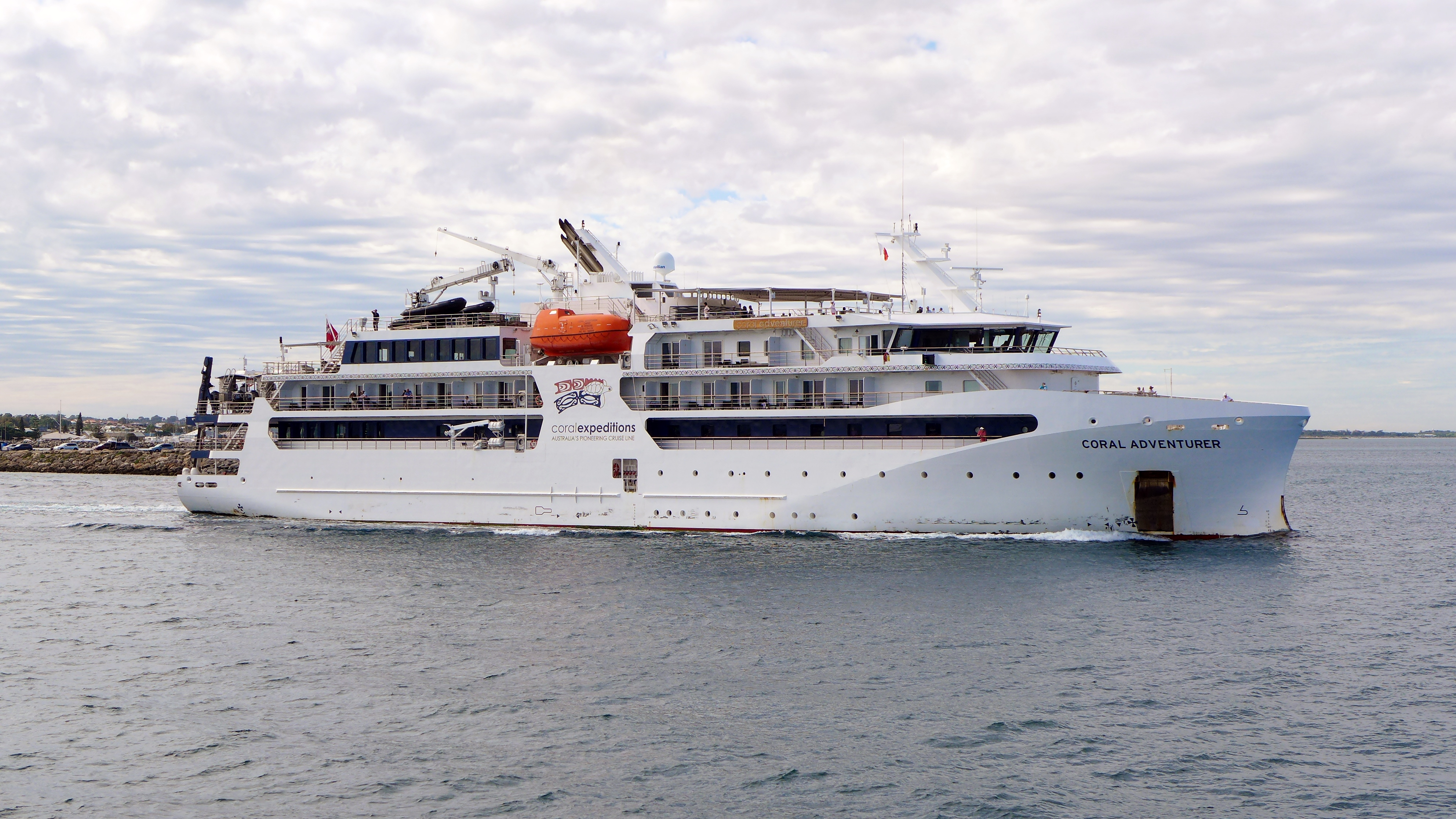
- Coral Adventurer departing from Fremantle in March 2023

Coral Adventurer is an expedition cruise ship operated by Coral Expeditions.

She was built in Vietnam, floated out in December 2018, and "officially launched" and christened in Singapore in April 2019.

In late October 2025, one of Coral Adventurer's passengers, Suzanne Rees, was found dead after the vessel left her behind at the end of a visit to Lizard Island, Queensland, Australia.

On 27 December 2025, the vessel ran aground north of Nussing Island in Papua New Guinea, with about 120 people, including 43 crew, on board. No-one was injured in the grounding.

As of nearly four days later, the vessel remained aground, early attempts to refloat and free her having failed. However, inspections had not identified any major damage to her hull. All 80 passengers had disembarked and were being carried by passenger boat to Lae, the second largest city in Papua New Guinea, where they were expected to transfer to a charter flight home to Australia.
