= ARC Centre of Excellence for Australian Biodiversity and Heritage =

Australian Indigenous research organisation

The ARC Centre of Excellence for Australian Biodiversity and Heritage (CABAH) is a research centre which focuses on the natural, historic and Indigenous heritage of Australia. Its aim is to increase understanding of the past in order to be able to better adapt and plan for the future.

The facility was opened at Parliament House, Canberra on 22 June 2017, and planned to run for seven years. It is funded by a grant of A$33.75 million from the Australian Research Council, A$1 million from the New South Wales Government, and A$11 million from 20 universities, museums, and organisations, which will pay for about 40 new research positions and over 50 students over the term of its existence.

An outreach program to schools and the broader community has been set up to engage participation and interest in science, and educational facilities to help train new researchers, with a particular focus on nurturing the careers of Indigenous and female researchers. As well as including scholars from STEM disciplines, including earth science, climate science, ecology and genetics, there are researchers from the fields of humanities, arts and social sciences disciplines, such as archaeology, Indigenous studies and museology.

== Organisation ==
As of April 2020, the Director of CABAH is geoscientist Professor Richard "Bert" Roberts, and the University of Wollongong is responsible for administration. Collaborators and partners are:

- Australian National University
- James Cook University in North Queensland
- The University of New South Wales
- University of Adelaide
- Monash University
- University of Tasmania
- Queensland Museum
- Australian Museum
- Scarp Archaeology Pty Ltd
- South Australian Museum
- State Library of New South Wales
- Bioplatforms Australia Ltd
- Université Savoie-Mont Blanc (University of Savoy, France)
- University of Papua New Guinea
- Max Planck Institute for the Science of Human History
- Natural History Museum of Denmark
- Indonesian National Centre for Archaeology
- University of Colorado, Boulder, US
- Papua New Guinea National Museum and Art Gallery

== Symposia ==
CABAH's 3rd Annual Symposium was held at Monash University from 4 to 8 November 2019.

== Studies ==
CABAH supported a series of archaeological excavations undertaken by a team co-led by Sean Ulm, distinguished professor at James Cook University, and Ian J. McNiven, professor at Monash University, and included traditional owners of Lizard Island in Queensland. The resulting study, published in April 2024 and co-authored by radiocarbon dating expert Quan Hua of CABAH, uncovered hitherto unproven dating of pottery sherds on the island. This was the first pottery in Australia to have been found and reliably dated, showing that the people of Australia were not geographically isolated, but involved with other seafaring peoples and in possession of considerable seafaring technology and navigational skills.
