= Eremiascincus isolepis =

Conservation status
- Least Concern (IUCN 3.1)

Scientific classification
- Kingdom: Animalia
- Phylum: Chordata
- Class: Reptilia
- Order: Squamata
- Suborder: Scinciformata
- Infraorder: Scincomorpha
- Family: Sphenomorphidae
- Genus: Eremiascincus
- Species: E. isolepis

Binomial name
- Eremiascincus isolepis (Boulenger, 1887)

Species of lizard

The northern bar-lipped skink or short-legged slender skink (Eremiascincus isolepis) is a species of skink found in the Northern Territory and Western Australia.
