= Eremiascincus brongersmai =

Conservation status
- Least Concern (IUCN 3.1)

Scientific classification
- Kingdom: Animalia
- Phylum: Chordata
- Class: Reptilia
- Order: Squamata
- Family: Scincidae
- Genus: Eremiascincus
- Species: E. brongersmai

Binomial name
- Eremiascincus brongersmai (Storr, 1972)
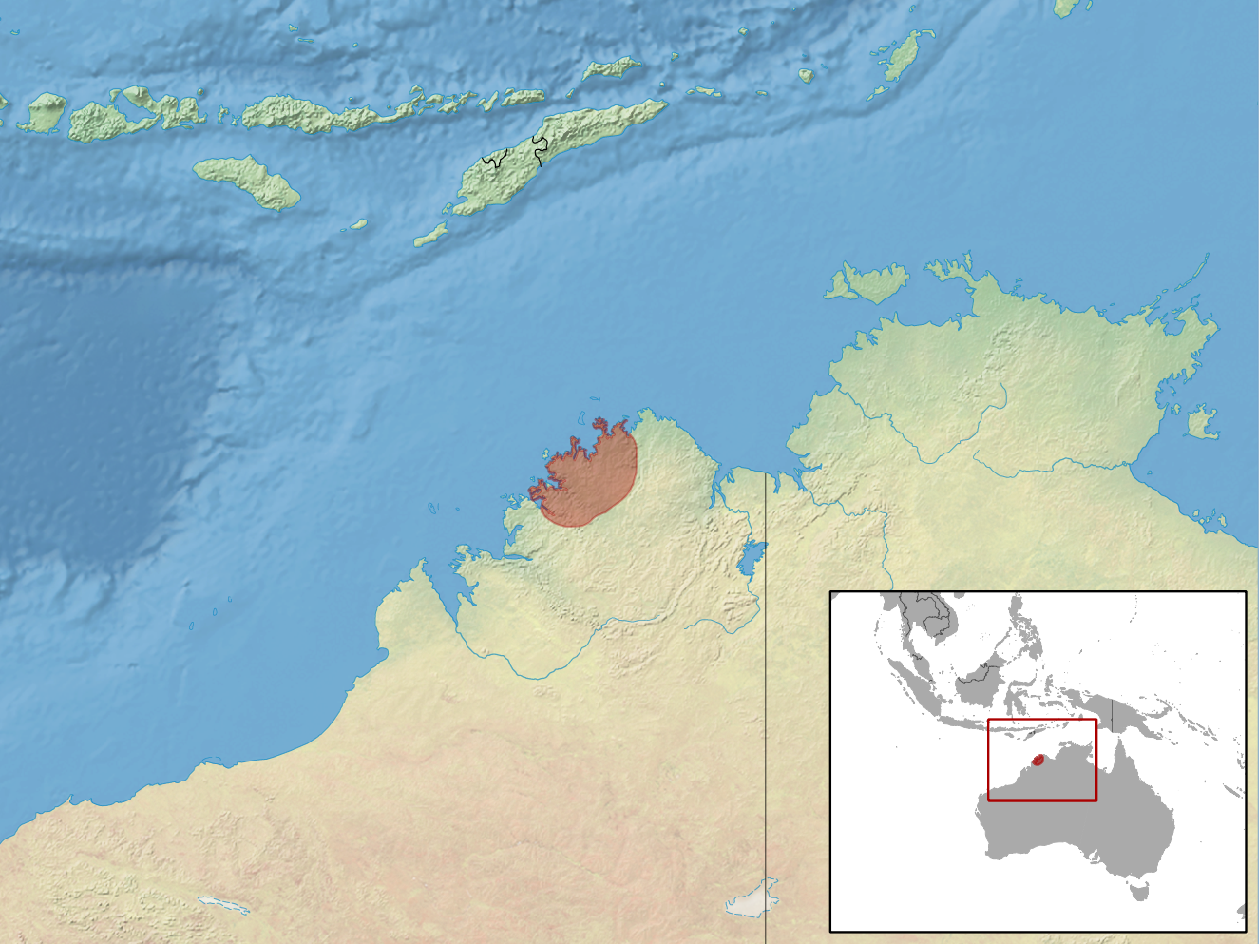

Synonyms
- Sphenomorphus brongersmai Storr, 1972; Glaphyromorphus brongersmai — Cogger, 2000; Eremiascincus brongersmai — Mecke, Doughty & Donnellan, 2009

Species of lizard

Eremiascincus brongersmai, also known commonly as Brongersma's tree skink and the brown-sided bar-lipped skink, is a species of lizard in the family Scincidae. The species is endemic to the state of Western Australia.

== Etymology ==
The specific name, brongersmai, is in honor of Dutch herpetologist Leo Brongersma.

== Habitat ==
The preferred natural habitats of E. brongersmai are rocky areas, shrubland, savanna, and forest.

== Description ==
E. brongersmai has fully developed limbs, with five digits on each front foot and five digits on each hind foot.

== Reproduction ==
E. brongersmai is oviparous.
