= Eremiascincus timorensis =

Conservation status
- Near Threatened (IUCN 3.1)

Scientific classification
- Kingdom: Animalia
- Phylum: Chordata
- Class: Reptilia
- Order: Squamata
- Family: Scincidae
- Genus: Eremiascincus
- Species: E. timorensis

Binomial name
- Eremiascincus timorensis (Greer, 1990)
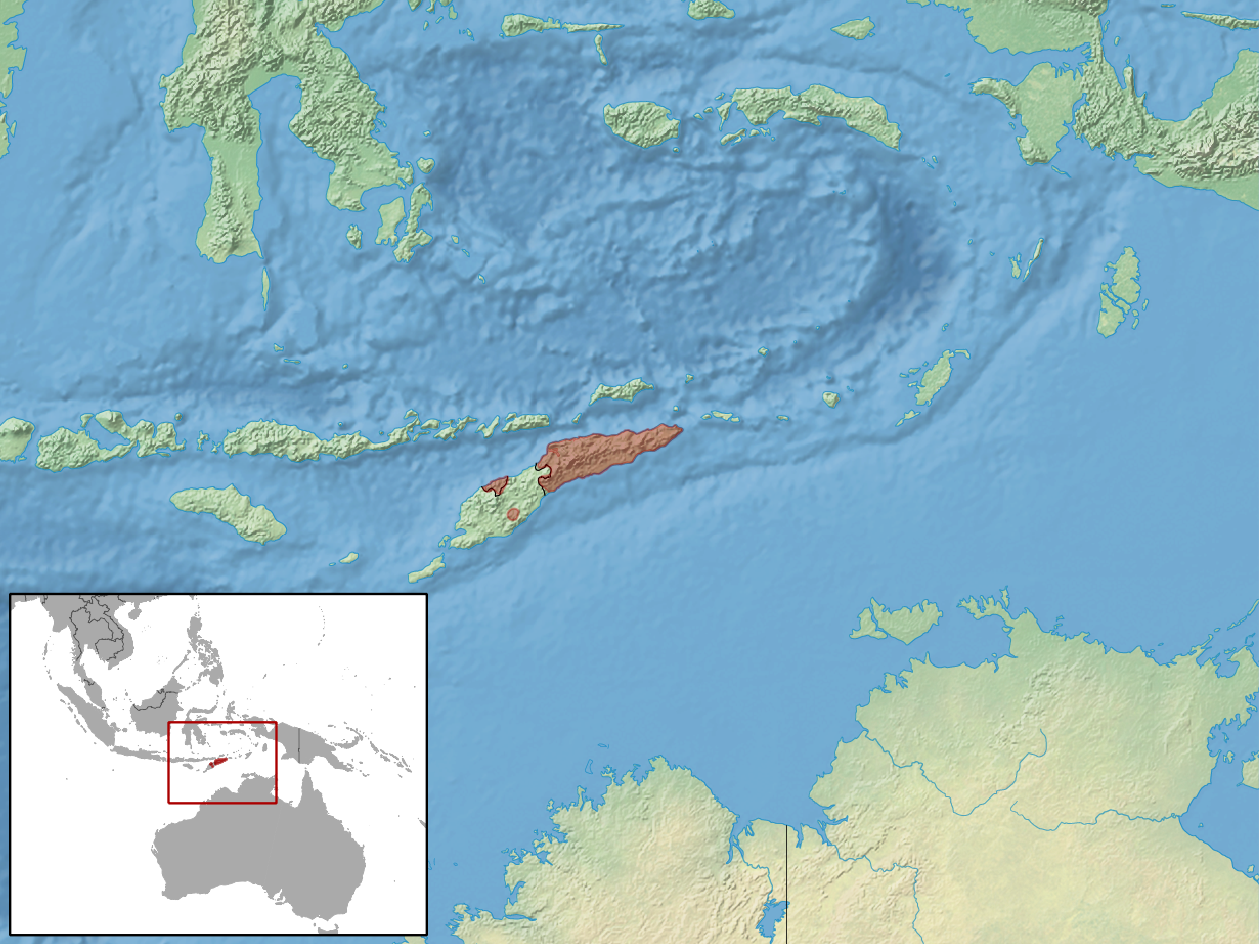

Species of lizard

Eremiascincus timorensis is a species of skink found in Timor in Indonesia.
