= Eremiascincus douglasi =

Conservation status
- Least Concern (IUCN 3.1)

Scientific classification
- Kingdom: Animalia
- Phylum: Chordata
- Class: Reptilia
- Order: Squamata
- Suborder: Scinciformata
- Infraorder: Scincomorpha
- Family: Sphenomorphidae
- Genus: Eremiascincus
- Species: E. douglasi

Binomial name
- Eremiascincus douglasi (Storr, 1967)

Species of lizard

The orange-sided bar-lipped skink (Eremiascincus douglasi) is a species of skink found in the Northern Territory in Australia.
