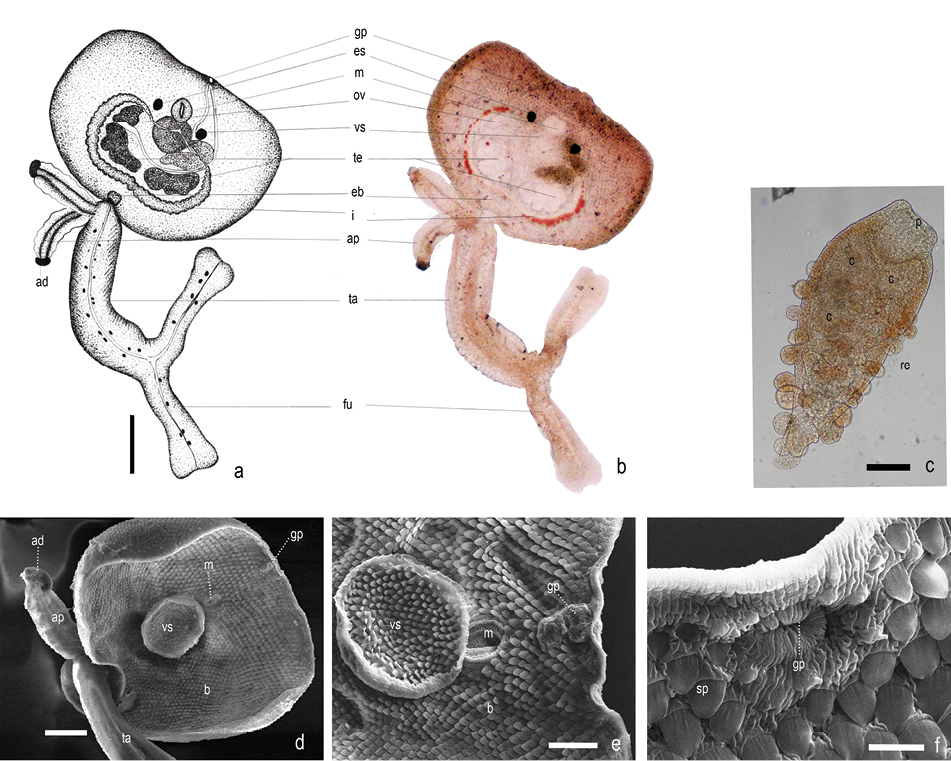

Scientific classification
- Kingdom: Animalia
- Phylum: Platyhelminthes
- Class: Trematoda
- Order: Plagiorchiida
- Family: Transversotrematidae
- Genus: Transversotrema; Witenberg, 1944

= Transversotrema =

Genus of flukes

Transversotrema is a genus of trematodes in the family Transversotrematidae.

== Species ==
- Transversotrema atkinsoni Hunter & Cribb, 2012
- Transversotrema borboleta Hunter & Cribb, 2012
- Transversotrema cabrarum Hunter, Hall & Cribb, 2012
- Transversotrema cardinalis Hunter & Cribb, 2012
- Transversotrema carmenae Hunter & Cribb, 2012
- Transversotrema chauhani Agrawal & Singh, 1981
- Transversotrema chevrarum Hunter, Hall & Cribb, 2012
- Transversotrema cutmorei Hunter, Hall & Cribb, 2012
- Transversotrema damsella Hunter & Cribb, 2012
- Transversotrema elegans Hunter, Ingram, Adlard, Bray & Cribb, 2010
- Transversotrema espanola Hunter & Cribb, 2012
- Transversotrema fusilieri Hunter & Cribb, 2012
- Transversotrema giganticum Hunter, Ingram, Adlard, Bray & Cribb, 2010
- Transversotrema haasi Witenberg, 1944
- Transversotrema hunterae Cutmore, Diggles & Cribb, 2016
- Transversotrema lacerta Hunter, Ingram, Adlard, Bray & Cribb, 2010
- Transversotrema licinum Manter, 1970
- Transversotrema manteri Hunter & Cribb, 2012
- Transversotrema novum Hunter & Cribb, 2012
- Transversotrema patialense (Soparkar, 1924) Crusz & Sathananthan, 1960
- Transversotrema polynesiae Cribb, Adlard, Bray, Sasal & Cutmore, 2014
- Transversotrema tragorum Hunter, Hall & Cribb, 2012
- Transversotrema witenbergi Hunter & Cribb, 2012
