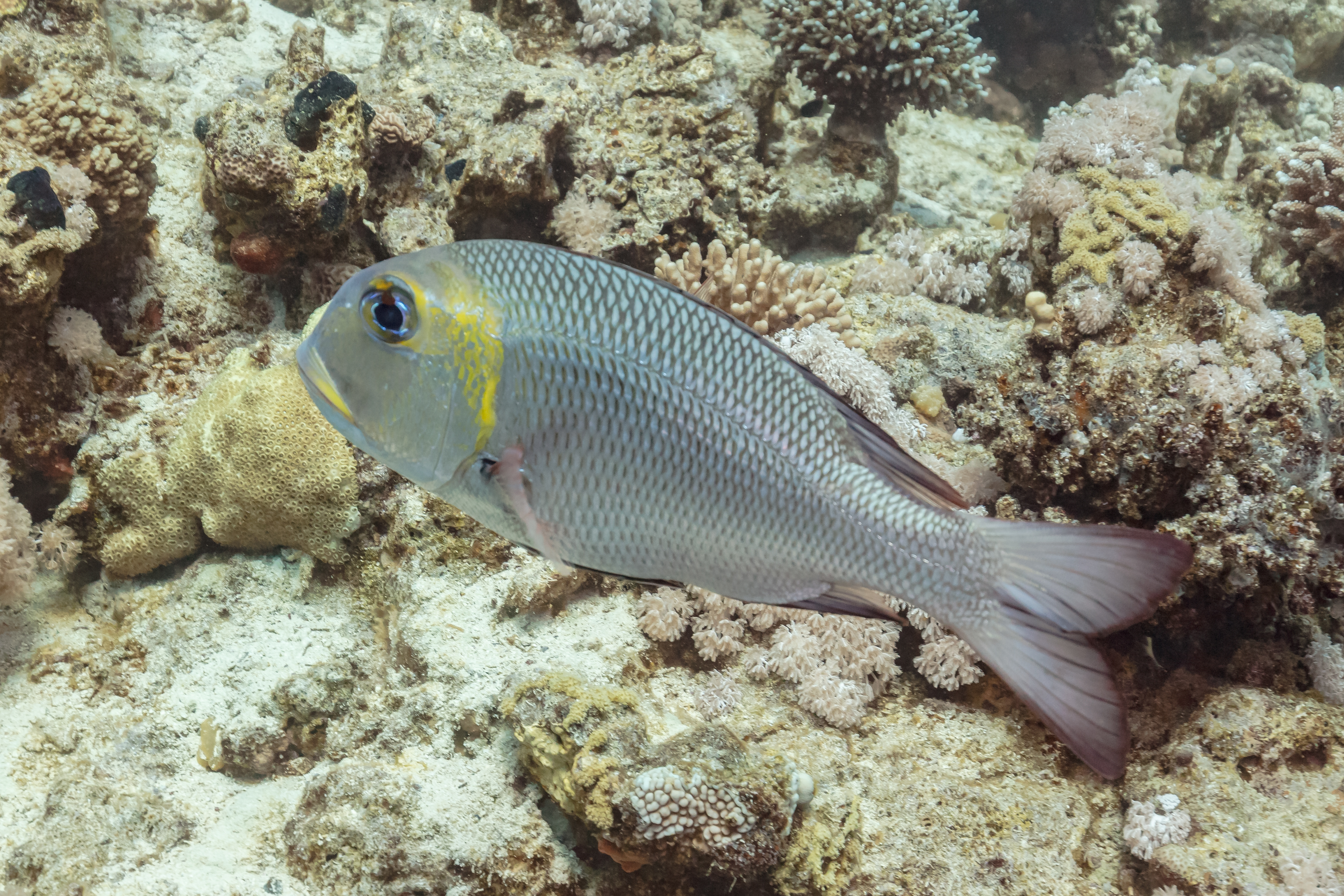

Conservation status
- Least Concern (IUCN 3.1)

Scientific classification
- Kingdom: Animalia
- Phylum: Chordata
- Class: Actinopterygii
- Order: Acanthuriformes
- Family: Lethrinidae
- Genus: Monotaxis
- Species: M. grandoculis

Binomial name
- Monotaxis grandoculis (Forsskål, 1775)

Synonyms
- Sciaena grandoculis Forsskål, 1775; Monotaxis indica Anonymous [E. T. Bennett], 1830; Lethrinus latidens Valenciennes, 1830

= Monotaxis grandoculis =

Species of fish

Monotaxis grandoculis, commonly known as the humpnose big-eye bream, bigeye barenose, bigeye bream, bigeye emperor, grand-eyed porgy fish, humpnose sea-bream, large-eye bream, mu or roundtooth large-eye bream, is a species of marine ray-finned fish belonging to the family Lethrinidae, the emperors and emperor breams. This species is found in the Indian and Pacific Ocean.

== Taxonomy ==
Monotaxis grandoculis was first formally described as Sciaena grandoculis in 1775 by the Swedish-speaking Finnish explorer, orientalist, naturalist Peter Forsskål with its type locality given as Jeddah. In 1830 the anonymous author, thought to be Edward Turner Bennett, of the section on zoological specimens in Memoir of the life and public services of Sir Thomas Stamford Raffles described a new species, Monotaxis indica, and placed it in a new monospecific genus Monotaxis. That species is now regarded as a synonym of Monotaxis grandoculis. Some authors place the genus Monotaxis in the subfamily Monotaxinae but the 5th edition of Fishes of the World does not recognise the subfamilies traditionally accepted within the family Lethrinidae as valid. The family Lethrinidae is classified by the 5th edition of Fishes of the World as belonging to the order Spariformes.

== Etymology ==
Monotaxis grandoculis has the specific name grandoculis, referring to its large eyes. Likewise, the common name large-eye bream does. The name is also used for the family Lethrinidae as a whole.

== Distribution and habitat ==
Monotaxis grandoculis has a wide Indo-Pacific distribution, from the Red Sea and the coast of eastern Africa to as far south as South Africa, across the Indian Ocean, although it is absent from the Persian Gulf. In the Pacific Ocean it extends as far east as the Hawaiian Islands, north to southern Japan and south to Australia. In Australia it is found at Christmas Island and the Cocos (Keeling) Islands and from Ningaloo Reef, Rowley Shoals and Scott Reef off Western Australia north to northeast of Evans Shoal in the Timor Sea and from the northern Great Barrier Reef south to Seal Rocks, New South Wales, with juveniles reaching as far south as Sydney. This fish lives close to reefs in sand and rubble areas at depths between 3 and 150 m (9.8 and 492.1 ft).

== Description ==
This species has a maximum published total length of 60 cm (24 in), although 40 cm (16 in) is more typical, and the maximum published weight is 5.9 kg (13 lb).

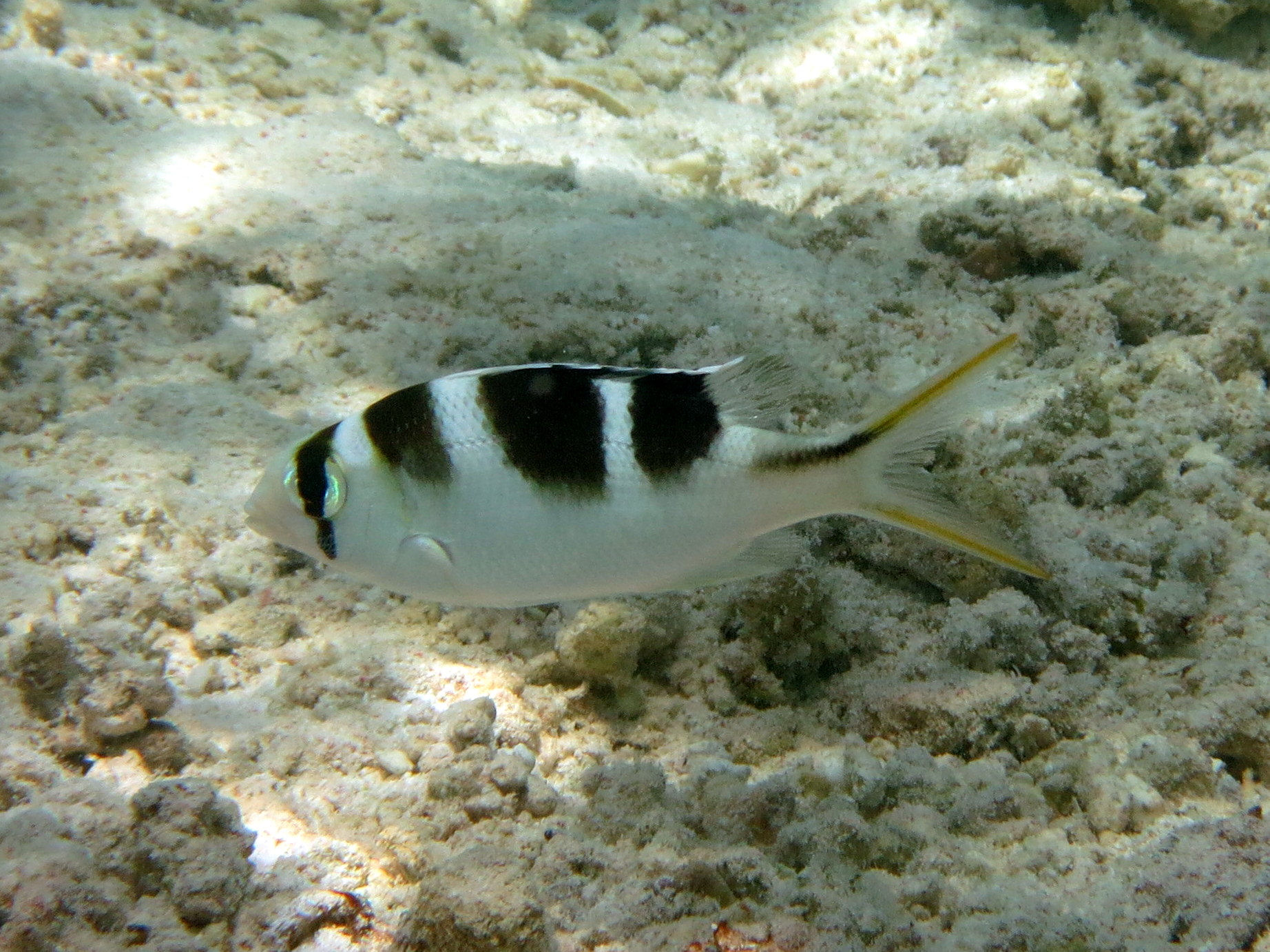
Juvenile

Monotaxis granoculis has an oblong body has a depth 2.1—2.7 times its standard length. The dorsal profile of the head creates a clear hump in front of the eyes with a steeply sloping snout below the hump. It has large eyes with a diameter roughly equal to the length of the snout. The rear margin of the preoperculum is finely serrated. There are canine-like teeth in the front of each jaw and these give way to small in the front of the sides of the jaws and with molar-like teeth in the back of the jaws. The dorsal fin has 10 spines and 10 soft rays while the anal fin has 3 spines and 9 soft rays. Its overall colour is silvery-greyish with thin dark margins on each scale and a large black blotch on the axil of the pectoral fin. It ordinarily has 3-4 black vertical bands divided by thinner white bands on the back. Juveniles have 3 wide dark brown to black bars, resembling saddles, on the body, with the two rear bars extending onto the dorsal fin. They have a black bar running through the eyes and a reddish band along the outer part of the lobes of the caudal fin.

== Biology ==
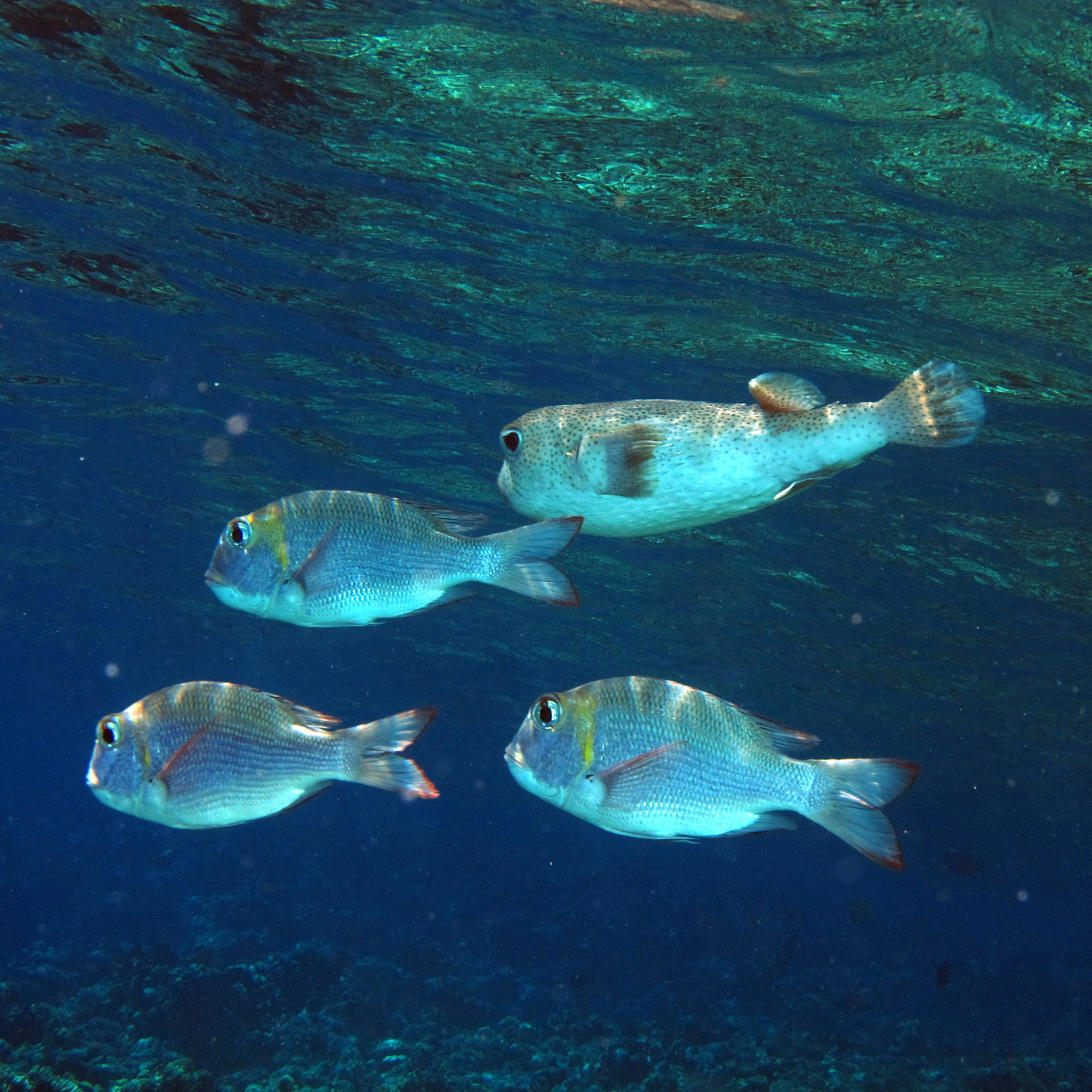
Schooling in the Red Sea, with a spot-fin porcupinefish

Monotaxis grandoculis are often encountered as solitary individuals but large adults may form schools of up to 50 individuals. It feeds on benthic invertebrates and fishes. This species has been found to be a host for the parasites Haliotrema angulocirrus, Proctoeces hawaiiensis, Pseudoplagioporus labiatus, Pycnadenoides pagrosomi and Transversotrema lacerta.

== Fisheries ==
Monotaxis grandoculis is a target for commercial and artisanal fisheries wherever it occurs, as well as being taken by recreational anglers. Techniques used to take these fishes include gill netting, fish traps, spearfishing and handlining. The catch is marketed fresh. In the Marshall Islands the consumption of this species has been thought to be a cause of ciguatera poisoning.
