= Eremiascincus emigrans =

Scientific classification
- Domain: Eukaryota
- Kingdom: Animalia
- Phylum: Chordata
- Class: Reptilia
- Order: Squamata
- Family: Scincidae
- Genus: Eremiascincus
- Species: E. emigrans

Binomial name
- Eremiascincus emigrans (Lidth de Jeude, 1895)

Species of lizard

Eremiascincus emigrans is a species of skink found in Indonesia.
