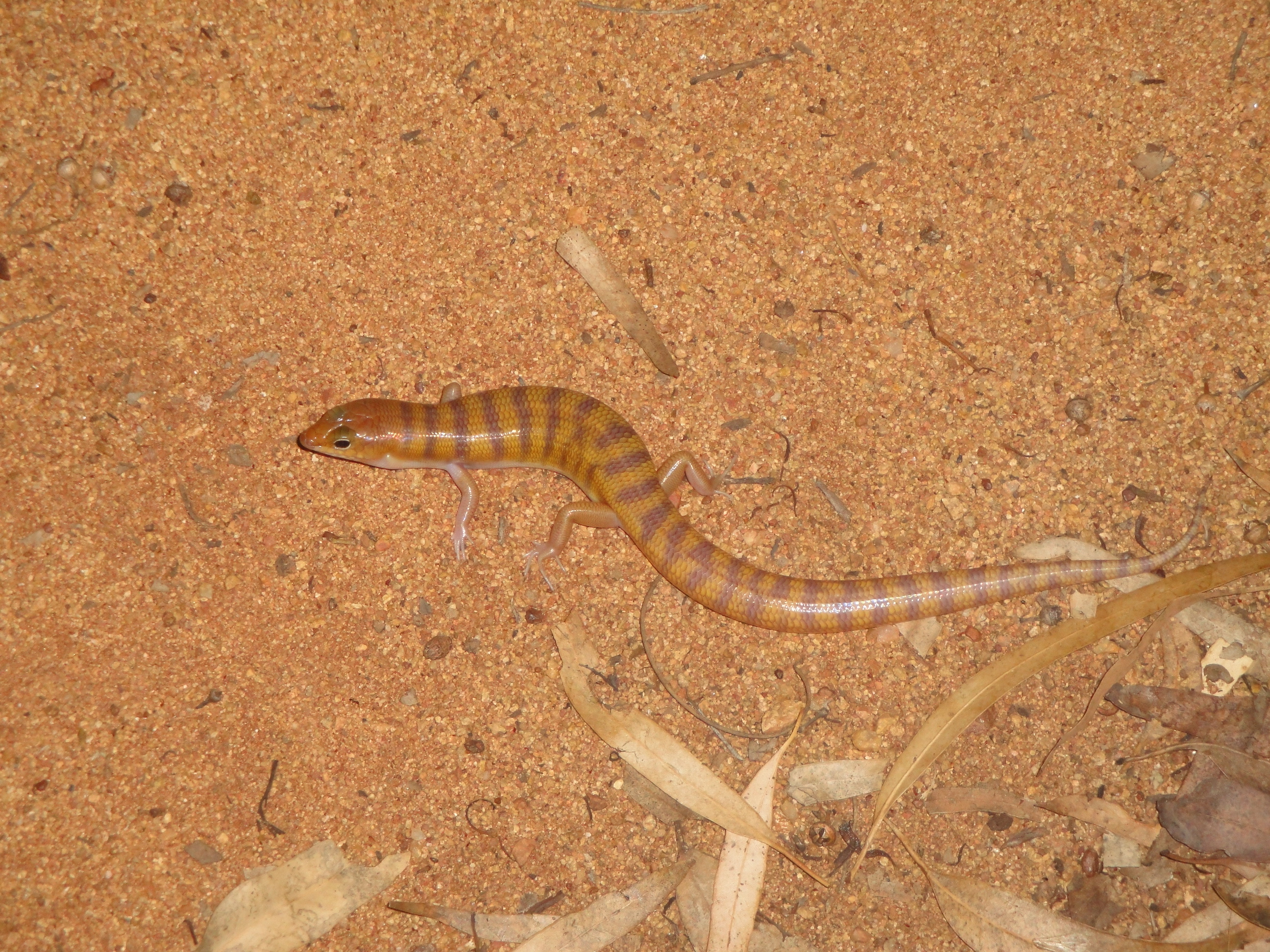
- Eremiascincus richardsonii

Scientific classification
- Kingdom: Animalia
- Phylum: Chordata
- Class: Reptilia
- Order: Squamata
- Family: Scincidae
- Subfamily: Sphenomorphinae
- Genus: Eremiascincus; Greer, 1979

Species
- 15 sp., see text

Synonyms
- Glaphyromorphus; Wells & Wellington, 1984

= Eremiascincus =

Genus of lizards

Eremiascincus is a genus of skinks, lizards in the family Scincidae. The genus is endemic to Australia, Indonesia, and East Timor.

== Species ==
The genus contains the following 15 valid species, listed alphabetically by specific name.

- Eremiascincus antoniorum (M.A. Smith, 1927)
- Eremiascincus brongersmai (Storr, 1972) – brown-sided bar-lipped skink
- Eremiascincus butlerorum (Aplin, How & Boeadi, 1993)
- Eremiascincus douglasi (Storr, 1967) – orange-sided bar-lipped skink
- Eremiascincus emigrans (Lidth de Jeude, 1895)
- Eremiascincus fasciolatus (Günther, 1867) – narrow-banded sand-swimmer, thick-tailed skink
- Eremiascincus intermedius (Sternfeld, 1919) – northern narrow–banded skink
- Eremiascincus isolepis (Boulenger, 1887) – northern bar-lipped skink, short-legged slender skink
- Eremiascincus musivus Mecke, Doughty & Donnellan, 2009 – mosaic desert skink
- Eremiascincus pallidus (Günther, 1875) – western sand-swimming skink, western narrow-banded skink
- Eremiascincus pardalis (Macleay, 1877) – lowlands bar-lipped skink
- Eremiascincus phantasmus Mecke, Doughty & Donnellan, 2013 – ghost skink
- Eremiascincus richardsonii (Gray, 1845) – broad-banded sand-swimmer, Richardson's skink
- Eremiascincus rubiginosus Mecke & Doughty, 2018 – rusty skink
- Eremiascincus timorensis (Greer, 1990)

Nota bene: A binomial authority in parentheses indicates that the species was originally described in a genus other than Eremiascincus.
