= Death of Suzanne Rees =

2025 death in Queensland, Australia

Suzanne Rees
- Photo of Rees
- Born: 1944 or 1945
- Died: Lizard Island, Queensland, Australia
- Body discovered: 26 October 2025 (aged 80)

In late October 2025, Suzanne Rees, an 80-year old passenger aboard the cruise ship Coral Adventurer, died on Lizard Island in Queensland, Australia. The Coral Adventurer arrived at Lizard Island on 25 October 2025, and Rees left the ship with a group for a hike to Cook's Look, a lookout point on the island. Rees fell ill during the hike and was told to return to the ship unaccompanied. However, the Coral Adventurer left Lizard Island without Rees on board. After her absence aboard the ship was noticed, a search-and-rescue mission began, and her dead body was discovered on the island the following morning. Her daughter Katherine Rees described her death as "a failure of care and common sense".

== Events and death ==
The cruise ship Coral Adventurer, operated by Coral Expeditions with a capacity of 120 guests, left the Far North Queensland town of Cairns on 24 October 2025 (Note: The Guardian lists a departure time of 5:30 pm, citing "VesselFinder satellite tracking data". ABC News lists a departure time of 7:32 am, citing "ship-tracking data".) on a planned 60-day circumnavigation of Australia. The ship arrived at Lizard Island at 8:30 am the following day. Lizard Island is located in the Great Barrier Reef, 240 kilometres (150 mi) north of Cairns. Coral Expeditions offered a hike to Cook's Look, a lookout point on the island. Suzanne Rees, an 80-year-old gardener and bushwalker from Sydney, had joined other passengers for the hike. Temperatures on Lizard Island on 25 October were approximately 30 °C (86 °F). According to Katherine Rees, the daughter of Suzanne Rees, police told the family that Suzanne fell ill during the hike and was asked to "head down, unescorted". The Coral Adventurer left Lizard Island later that day (Note: The Guardian, citing VesselFinder, states that the ship left Lizard Island at 3:30 pm. ABC News indicates a time later in the day, stating the ship was "seen departing the surrounding waters around sunset between 6pm and 7pm".) without Rees on board.

When Rees failed to attend dinner (Note: The Guardian and The Australian both indicate that Rees' absence for dinner was noted "at about 6pm".) aboard the Coral Adventurer, searches took place on the ship for her. The ship's crew initially hypothesised that she had fallen overboard. The Australian Maritime Safety Authority was notified at 10 pm AEST (Note: As indicated by The Australian and ABC News. The Guardian lists 9 pm, while BBC News lists "21:00 local time (10:00 GMT)", this is likely to be erroneous as Australian Eastern Standard Time, the year-round time zone of Queensland, is 10 hours ahead of Greenwich Mean Time rather than the 11 of Australian Eastern Daylight Saving Time which is in use in all other eastern Australian states from October to April.) by the master of the ship that she was missing. A search and rescue operation began, and the Coral Adventurer turned back towards Lizard Island. Rees' dead body was found on the island on the morning of 26 October, discovered by a helicopter operated by Nautilus Aviation. Traci Ayres, a sailor in the area, stated that she was discovered at approximately 9:30 am.

== Immediate aftermath ==
Suzanne Rees' death was first reported in news media on 28 October 2025. A spokeswoman for Queensland Police stated that her death was "sudden and non-suspicious", with a report to be prepared for the coroner. ABC News reported the following day that the Australian Maritime Safety Authority would be investigating her death, and that they would speak with the crew of the Coral Adventurer when it reached its next stop in Darwin, Northern Territory. Katherine Rees, Suzanne's daughter, described the family as being "shocked and saddened" over the circumstances of Suzanne's death, saying it appeared to be "a failure of care and common sense". Katherine Rees called for the holding of a coronial inquiry, which would occur following the completion of the coroner's investigation.

Coral Expeditions chief executive Mark Fifield expressed condolences for Rees' death, and announced on 1 November that the remainder of the cruise would be cancelled, due to that and mechanical issues on board. The Coral Adventurer had anchored in the Torres Strait and encountered further mechanical problems, with passengers and some crew being airlifted from Horn Island. The ship did not continue to Darwin and instead turned back towards its home port of Cairns. On the evening of 4 November 2025, the Coral Adventurer moored at approximately 2 nautical miles (3.7 km; 2.3 mi) north-north-east of the harbour at Yorkeys Knob, with no available berths at the port of Cairns. The ship was boarded by Australian Maritime Safety Authority (AMSA) representatives the following morning.

=== Informed commentary ===
David Beirman, an adjunct fellow in management and tourism at the University of Technology Sydney, told The Guardian that the seeming lack of a passenger count aboard the Coral Adventurer was "very unusual", describing the counting of passengers leaving and returning during shore excursions as "standard" and "basic common sense". Adam Smith, an adjunct professor in marine science at James Cook University who has previously acted as a guest lecturer on Coral Expedition ships, stated to ABC News that there was often "less direct supervision" during shore excursions, with the ability to monitor individual passengers being limited in comparison to boat-based activities such as snorkelling.

== See also ==
- Disappearance of Tom and Eileen Lonergan
