= Palfrey Island =

Island in Queensland, Australia

- Location within Queensland

Geography
- Location: Great Barrier Reef, Australia
- Coordinates: 14°41′33″S 145°26′47″E
- Archipelago: Lizard Islands
- Major islands: Lizard Island
- Area: 7 km^{2} (2.7 sq mi)

Administration
- Australia
- State: Queensland
- Local Government Area: Shire of Cook

Palfrey Island is an island in the offshore locality of Lizard in the Shire of Cook, Queensland, Australia. It is 270 km north of Cairns and is part of the Lizard Island Group and south of Lizard Island. There is an automated lighthouse structure situated on this island.

== Geography ==
Lizard Island is a high granite island about 7 square kilometres in size, with three smaller islands nearby (Palfrey, South and Bird). Together these islands form the Lizard Island Group and their well-developed fringing reef encircles the 10 metre deep Blue Lagoon.

The only settlements on the island are the Research Station, the Lizard Island Resort operated by Delaware North Australia Parks & Resorts and a basic camping area operated by the Queensland Parks & Wildlife Service.

All islands in the Lizard Island Group are part of the Lizard Island National Park, administered by the Queensland Parks and Wildlife Service. Lizard Island is situated in the waters of the Great Barrier Reef Marine Park, administered jointly by the Great Barrier Reef Marine Park Authority and the Queensland Environmental Protection Agency. Permits are required for all manipulative research in the Lizard Island Group and the waters surrounding it.

The Lizard Island Group is a mid-shelf reef, situated 30 kilometres from the Australian mainland. Most reef and island types characteristic of the Great Barrier Reef are accessible from the Research Station.

== Historic significance ==
During his epic voyage of 1770, Captain James Cook climbed the peak on Lizard Island to chart a course out to sea through the maze of reefs which confronted him.
