= Turtle Group National Park =

National park in Australia

- IUCN category II (national park)
- Location within Queensland
- Location: Queensland
- Nearest city: Cooktown
- Coordinates: 14°42′17″S 145°12′12″E
- Area: 0.91 km^{2} (0.35 sq mi)
- Established: 1939
- Governing body: Queensland Parks and Wildlife Service
- Website: http://www.nprsr.qld.gov.au/parks/turtle-group/

Turtle Group is a national park in Queensland, Australia, 1,634 km northwest of Brisbane.

== See also ==
- Protected areas of Queensland
