= Eremiascincus pallidus =

Conservation status
- Least Concern (IUCN 3.1)

Scientific classification
- Kingdom: Animalia
- Phylum: Chordata
- Class: Reptilia
- Order: Squamata
- Suborder: Scinciformata
- Infraorder: Scincomorpha
- Family: Sphenomorphidae
- Genus: Eremiascincus
- Species: E. pallidus

Binomial name
- Eremiascincus pallidus (Günther, 1875)

Species of lizard

The western sand-swimming skink or western narrow-banded skink (Eremiascincus pallidus) is a species of skink found in Australia.
