= Eremiascincus rubiginosus =

Scientific classification
- Domain: Eukaryota
- Kingdom: Animalia
- Phylum: Chordata
- Class: Reptilia
- Order: Squamata
- Family: Scincidae
- Genus: Eremiascincus
- Species: E. rubiginosus

Binomial name
- Eremiascincus rubiginosus Mecke & Doughty, 2018

Species of lizard

The rusty skink (Eremiascincus rubiginosus) is a species of skink found in Western Australia.
