= Eremiascincus musivus =

Conservation status
- Least Concern (IUCN 3.1)

Scientific classification
- Kingdom: Animalia
- Phylum: Chordata
- Class: Reptilia
- Order: Squamata
- Suborder: Scinciformata
- Infraorder: Scincomorpha
- Family: Sphenomorphidae
- Genus: Eremiascincus
- Species: E. musivus

Binomial name
- Eremiascincus musivus Mecke, Doughty, & Donnellan, 2009

Species of lizard

The mosaic desert skink (Eremiascincus musivus) is a species of skink found in Western Australia.
