= Eremiascincus pardalis =

Conservation status
- Least Concern (IUCN 3.1)

Scientific classification
- Kingdom: Animalia
- Phylum: Chordata
- Class: Reptilia
- Order: Squamata
- Suborder: Scinciformata
- Infraorder: Scincomorpha
- Family: Sphenomorphidae
- Genus: Eremiascincus
- Species: E. pardalis

Binomial name
- Eremiascincus pardalis (Macleay, 1877)

Species of lizard

The lowlands bar-lipped skink (Eremiascincus pardalis) is a species of skink found in Queensland in Australia.
