= Lizard Island Airport =

Airport in Queensland, Australia

- IATA: LZR; ICAO: YLZI

Summary
- Airport type: Public
- Operator: Lizard Island Resort Pty Ltd
- Location: Lizard Island, Queensland, Australia
- Elevation AMSL: 70 ft / 21 m
- Coordinates: 14°40′24″S 145°27′18″E

Map
- Location in Queensland

Runways
Direction	Length		Surface
Direction	m	ft	Surface
12/30	926	3,038	Asphalt
- Sources: AIP and World Aero Data

Lizard Island Airport (IATA: LZR, ICAO: YLZI) is an airport on Lizard Island National Park in Queensland, Australia. It is served from Cairns by Hinterland Aviation.

== Airlines and destinations ==
Airlines	Destinations
Hinterland Aviation	Cairns

== See also ==
- List of airports in Queensland
