= Environmental Protection Agency (Queensland) =

Governmental organisation in Queensland

Queensland's Environmental Protection Agency (abbreviated to EPA) was for some time a separate department of the Queensland Government, and, following 2009 state elections, became a part of the Government's larger Department of Environment and Science.

This part of the Department of Environment and Resource Management's role is to manage climate change and protect the environment on behalf of the Queensland Government.

To achieve this the section aims to provide Conservation and Environmental Services: including a Queensland Parks and Wildlife Service to manage the Queensland's protected area estate; plus Environmental Services to assist manage development, business, and industry. It aims to promote Sustainable futures: including planning for climate change; encouraging environmental sustainability, supporting environmental innovation, and developing strategies and policies to achieve an environmentally sustainable future; and achieve organisational performance and capability: including building a "robust" scientific base to government policy and decision making, and valuing people and accumulating knowledge within the organisation.

== See also ==
- Protected areas of Queensland
- Waste management in Australia
