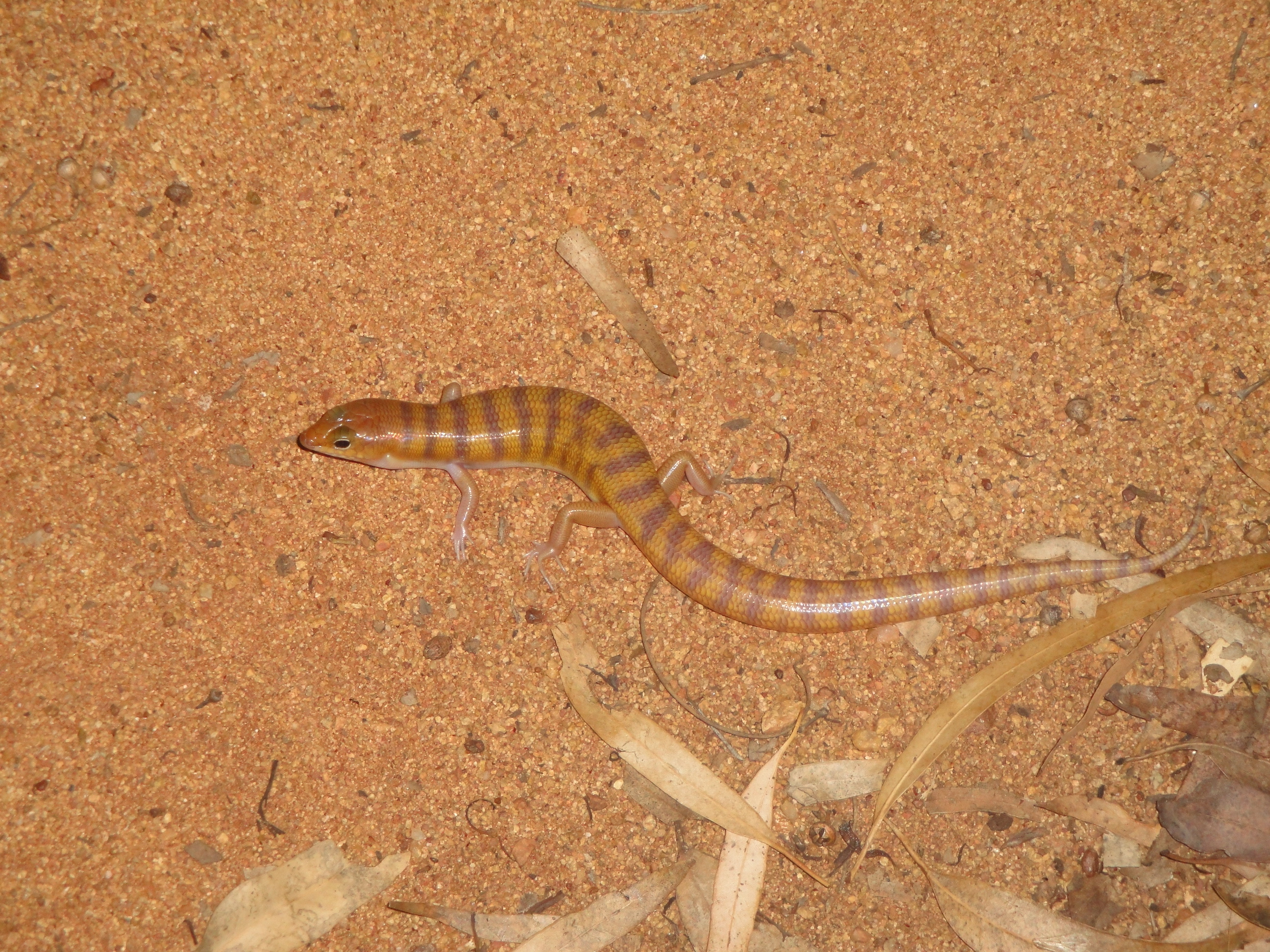

Conservation status
- Least Concern (IUCN 3.1)

Scientific classification
- Kingdom: Animalia
- Phylum: Chordata
- Class: Reptilia
- Order: Squamata
- Family: Scincidae
- Genus: Eremiascincus
- Species: E. richardsonii

Binomial name
- Eremiascincus richardsonii (Gray, 1845)

= Eremiascincus richardsonii =

Species of lizard

The broad-banded sand-swimmer or Richardson's skink (Eremiascincus richardsonii) is a species of skink found in Australia.

== Naming ==
The Eremiascincus genus was created under the Sphenomorphus Group due to having distinct differences and morphological adaptions compared to other skinks in the genus, even though they are visually similar. These skinks possess traits that are unique to those other skinks in this category. The Broad Banded Sand Swimmer was derived and named after John Richardson, who was a Scottish Naturalist.

It is named ‘sand-swimmer’ due to its ability to ‘swim’ over sand as it locomotes, and to evade predators by quickly burrowing into the sand.

== Physical description ==
This skink is considered medium-sized, andhas a snout to vent length of around 113mm as a maximum, however has an average SVL of 75mm. The tail length varies but is up to 171% longer than the SVL.

They are a very distinct skink in their looks, although are similar in many ways to the E. fasciolatus. The Broad Banded Sand-Swimmer can be distinguished from other similar species by the number of caudal bands it possesses and the patterning of those bands which can be seen in image 3. These skinks have between 19 and 32 bands on the tail, however the Narrow Banded possesses more (between 35 and 40). On the nape, the broad banded possesses 8-14 bands that whereas the narrow-banded swimmer 10-19 narrow bands on its nape. The bands on the body are much broader than those of the narrow banded, and they are generally less regular than the narrow banded. If the skink has lost its tail in the past, using the bands to distinguish the skink is unable to be used, as once the tail is regrown, it does not possess the caudal bands.

This skink possesses a less depressed snout than that of the E. fasciolatus. The colour of these skinks can be a pale brown to dark reddish colour, with the young hatchlings having a bright yellow colour and some of these variances can be seen in images 1 and 2. The scales of this skink are very shiny and has five toes on each of the animal's feet- both the forelimbs and hindlimbs.

Another way that the E.richardsonii can be identified is through the parietal scales being in contact rather than being separated. This is also a way to tell if the skink has a transparent lower eyelid, as skinks with round eyes do not have this feature, however when they are hold an elliptical eye shape.

== Diet ==
This sand swimmer’s diet consists of a variety of different animals that live around them which can include arthropods such as grasshoppers, moths, beetles, termites, and spiders, and has been described on occasion to eat other small lizards. These skinks also can eat fruit as part of its diet. When the E.richardsonii is agitated by waiting to capture its prey, the tail waves in a "cat like fashion" and the E.richardsonii forages over large distances and is an aggressive hunter.

== Distribution ==
The E.richardsonii is commonly spread throughout arid regions of Australia and has been identified in a range of States around Australia that have desert skinks. This includes areas of Western Australia such as the Nullarbor Plain and the Tanami. In New South Wales, some of these locations include the North Far Western Plains right through to the Southern Far Western Plains and many arid areas in between, with some isolated occurrences in the Northern North Western Slopes of the state. In the Northern Territory, distribution includes the Kimberly Desert and the Macdonnell Ranges, and within South Australia, this species can be found in the Simpson Desert and other arid regions. These skinks are not known to be located or to inhabit arid areas of Victoria.

Although both species of the banded skinks inhabit sandy soils, the E.richardsonii can also be found on heavy and stony soils, not just limited to desert sands. This reptile has also been found in deep crevices and caves due to the nocturnal life that it lives and also other dark areas such as rabbit holes.

== Reproduction ==
This species was previously believed to be viviparous, however this was later found to be incorrect. It is instead oviparous. E.richarsonii commonly lays 4-5 eggs per clutch, however some studies suggest an increase in clutch size when the parent skink is larger.

Sexual maturity for the E.richardsonii was 69mm for females and 67mm for males.

== Adaptions ==
Sand swimmers have adapted to be almost the same colour as sand, and have been described as looking indistinguishable from the surrounding sand when either looking from above the skink or from the side.

They have also gained a transparent disk (called a transparent lower lid) on their eyes. This allows the skink to burrow into the sand and not get sand in its eyes, whilst retaining the ability to see through this cover.

Although they are a species that has adapted to desert environments, this species is actually less tolerant of heat and is more susceptible to dehydration along with heat stress than other reptiles that live within deserts around the world.

E. richardsonii is a part of the Eremiascincus family, which has 15 different species. The Eremiascincus family are skinks that are nocturnal, fossorial and territorial.

This species is a thigmotherm, meaning that it primarily relies on heat exchange as its substrate for body temperature, and comes out after dark where they rely on air temperature and patches of warm ground.
