= Cape Flattery (Queensland) =

Cape in northern Queensland, Australia

- Cape
- Location in Australia
- Coordinates: 14.9486°S 145.34972°E
- Location: Cape York Peninsula, Australia
- Offshore water bodies: Coral Sea
- Elevation: 19 m (62 ft)

Cape Flattery is a cape in northern Queensland approximately 40 kilometres (25 mi) north of Cooktown, Queensland. The headland was named by James Cook on 10 August 1770 as he charted the eastern Australian coast to acknowledge his misjudgement, believing the ship was "clear of all danger...but this we soon found otherwise".

== Silica mine ==
Cape Flattery is the location of the world's biggest silica mine. The mine was established in 1967 and was severely damaged by Cyclone Ita in 2014.

The cape's local port is used for the shipping of silica sand from a local subsidiary of Mitsubishi Corporation, and exports the most silica sand internationally, with 1.7 million tonnes exported alone in 2007–08.

== Climate ==
Cape Flattery has a tropical savannah climate (Köppen: Aw), with a sultry wet season from December and April and a slightly cooler dry season from May to November. Average maxima are high year-round, ranging from 32.1 °C (89.8 °F) in January to 26.7 °C (80.1 °F) in July. Annual rainfall averages 1,437.4 millimetres (56.59 in), with a maximum in late summer and a minimum in winter and spring. Extreme temperatures have ranged from 41.9 °C (107.4 °F) on 26 November 2018 to 11.0 °C (51.8 °F) on 29 June 2007.

Climate data for Cape Flattery (14º58'12"S, 145º18'36"E, 19 m AMSL) (2003-2024 normals and extremes)
Month	Jan	Feb	Mar	Apr	May	Jun	Jul	Aug	Sep	Oct	Nov	Dec	Year
Record high °C (°F)	39.5 (103.1)	39.0 (102.2)	36.7 (98.1)	34.1 (93.4)	31.9 (89.4)	31.6 (88.9)	29.9 (85.8)	31.0 (87.8)	31.4 (88.5)	34.0 (93.2)	41.9 (107.4)	39.2 (102.6)	41.9 (107.4)
Mean daily maximum °C (°F)	32.1 (89.8)	32.1 (89.8)	31.2 (88.2)	30.2 (86.4)	28.7 (83.7)	27.1 (80.8)	26.7 (80.1)	27.4 (81.3)	29.0 (84.2)	30.4 (86.7)	31.9 (89.4)	32.6 (90.7)	30.0 (85.9)
Mean daily minimum °C (°F)	24.8 (76.6)	24.8 (76.6)	24.7 (76.5)	24.4 (75.9)	23.4 (74.1)	21.9 (71.4)	21.3 (70.3)	21.3 (70.3)	22.3 (72.1)	23.1 (73.6)	24.4 (75.9)	25.0 (77.0)	23.5 (74.2)
Record low °C (°F)	20.7 (69.3)	21.4 (70.5)	19.7 (67.5)	19.3 (66.7)	12.2 (54.0)	11.0 (51.8)	13.8 (56.8)	13.0 (55.4)	13.0 (55.4)	15.9 (60.6)	19.2 (66.6)	19.2 (66.6)	11.0 (51.8)
Average precipitation mm (inches)	272.7 (10.74)	261.5 (10.30)	373.7 (14.71)	179.3 (7.06)	60.1 (2.37)	38.6 (1.52)	35.7 (1.41)	17.6 (0.69)	7.8 (0.31)	15.4 (0.61)	33.8 (1.33)	145.0 (5.71)	1,437.4 (56.59)
Average precipitation days (≥ 1.0 mm)	15.8	15.0	17.7	12.0	8.3	7.3	7.3	3.9	2.0	2.6	3.3	8.1	103.3
Source: Bureau of Meteorology (2003-2024 normals and extremes)
