= Follicle (anatomy) =

Small spherical group of cells containing a cavity

A follicle is a small, spherical or vase-like group of cells enclosing a cavity in which some other structure grows or other material is contained. Thyroid follicles make up the thyroid gland. Follicles are best known as the sockets from which hairs grow in humans and other mammals, but the bristles of annelid worms also grow from such sockets.
