= Lizard Island =

Island in Queensland, Australia

Lizard Island National Park
- IUCN category II (national park)
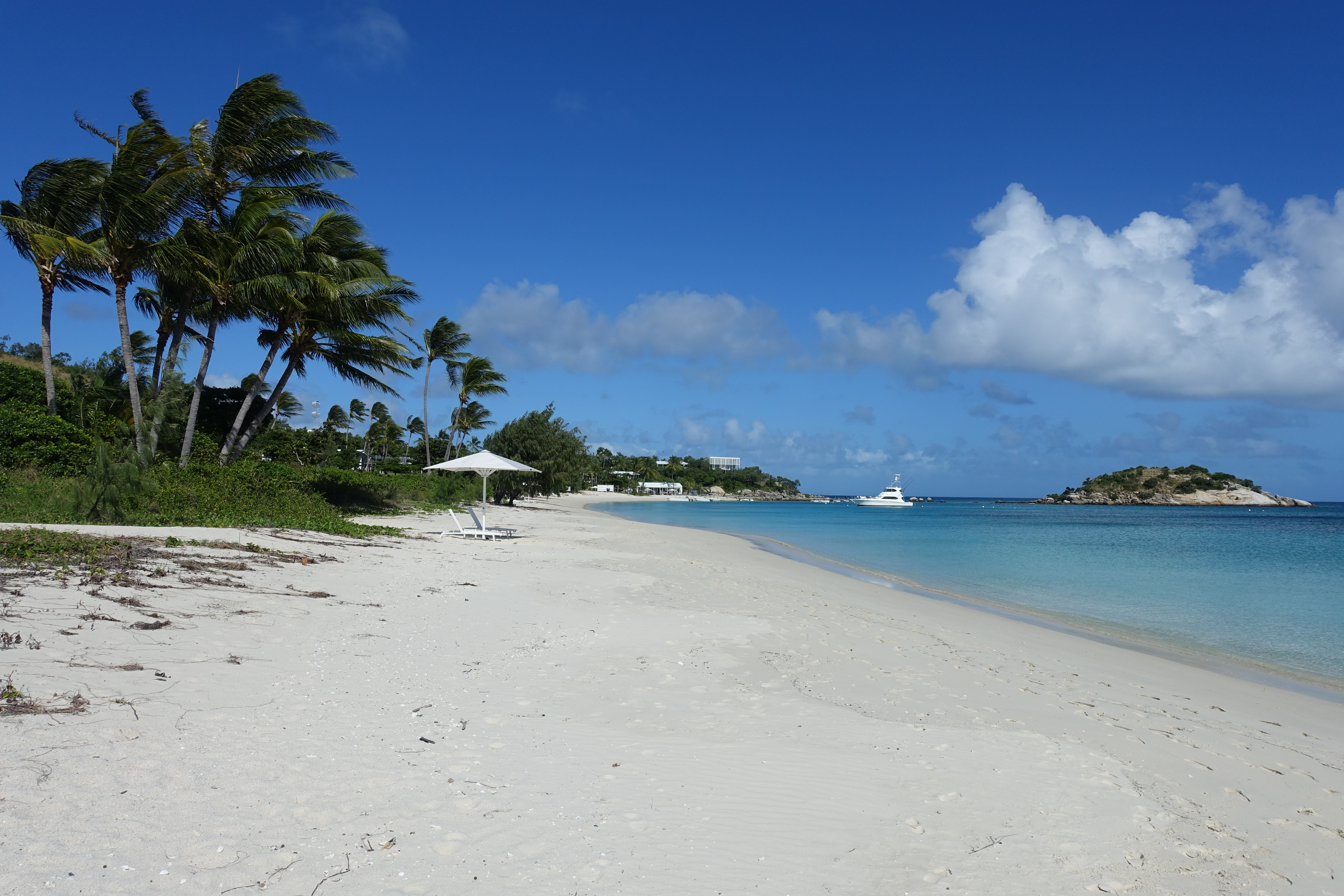

- Location within Queensland
- Location: Queensland
- Nearest city: Cooktown
- Coordinates: 14°40′08″S 145°27′34″E
- Area: 9.9 km^{2} (3.8 sq mi)
- Established: 1939
- Governing body: Queensland Parks and Wildlife Service
- Website: Official website

Lizard Island, also known as Jiigurru or Dyiigurra, is an island on the Great Barrier Reef in Queensland, Australia, 1,624 kilometres (1,009 mi) northwest of Brisbane. It is part of the Lizard Island Group that also includes Palfrey Island, and also part of the Lizard Island National Park. Lizard Island is within the locality of Lizard in the Cook Shire. The traditional owners of the Lizard Island group are the Aboriginal Australian clan known as the Dingaal (or Dingiil) people.

== History ==
Archaeological excavations and studies have shown that human occupation of the island dates to 6510–5790 cal BP, which shows that Jiigurru was the earliest offshore island occupied on the northern part of the Great Barrier Reef.

Lizard Island was known as Dyiigurra to the Dingaal people, an Aboriginal clan who have occupied the island for thousands of years. Today this is usually rendered Jiigurru, and the local people are sometimes referred to as Dingiil. David Horton's 1996 representation of Norman Tindale's map shows the lands of the Guugu Yimithirr people extending from south of Hope Vale to an area which covers Lizard Island. The Great Barrier Reef Marine Park Authority states on their website that the traditional lands of the "Guugu Yimidhirr Warra Nation" extend from Lizard Island to the Hope Vale region. The website "Dingaals Lizard Island" states that the island has been in the custodianship of the Dingaal people for thousands of years. According to the Cairns Institute and Queensland Parks and Wildlife Service, the Dingaal people are the traditional owners of the Lizard Island group. As of April 2024 the senior elder of the Dingaals is Gordon Charlie. The Dingaal believed that the Lizard group of islands had been created in the Dreamtime. They saw it as a stingray, with Lizard Island being the body and the other islands in the group forming the tail. The island has along been regarded as a sacred place, used for ceremonies and trading.

Pottery found on the island has been dated at more than 1,800 years old, showing that pots were most likely made by Aboriginal people using locally sourced materials. The 2024 study showed that the people who lived there were involved in the ancient maritime networks in the vicinity, including the possession of sophisticated skills in building ocean-going vessels as well as navigation. (See below).

The name Lizard Island was given to it by Captain Cook when he passed it on 12 August 1770. He commented, "The only land animals we saw here were lizards, and these seem'd to be pretty plenty, which occasioned my naming the Island Lizard Island." Cook climbed the peak on Lizard Island to chart a course out to sea through the maze of reefs which confronted him and the island's summit has since been called 'Cook's Look'.

By the 1840s, the island was being used by sea cucumber (trepang, or bêche-de-mer) fishermen who found that the waters contained substantial quantities of the creature which was a popular delicacy in Asia. Scottish naturalist John McGillivray visited the island in the Julia Percy in 1861, and wrote that there had been bêche-de-mer vessels operating there from Sydney, Singapore, and Hong Kong for 15 years prior.

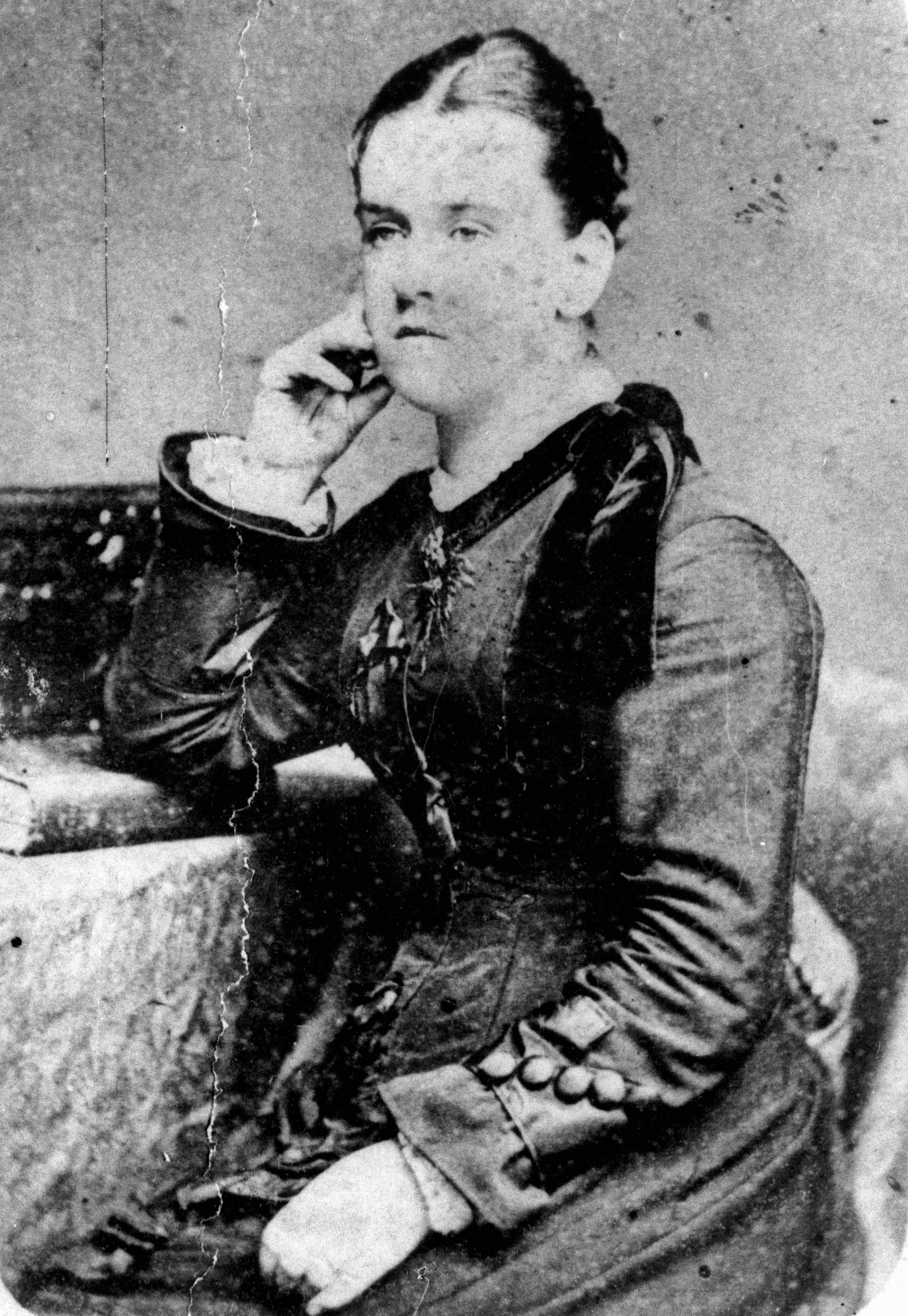
Portrait of Mary Beatrice Watson

In 1879, Captain Robert Watson with his wife Mary Watson, two servants and baby son, modified an abandoned cottage left on the island by the crew of the Julia Percy. The ruins are still visible. Captain Watson was a sea cucumber fisherman, and his wife Mary Watson was only 21 when she arrived at Lizard Island. During one of the captain's absences in September 1880, Mary, her son Ferrier, and two Chinese servants, Ah Sam and Ah Leung, were left on the island. A group of Guugu Yimmidir or Dingaal people travelled on a regular seasonal trip by canoe, or went to investigate smoke at a sacred site on the island. The Watsons' home was close to the only source of fresh water, and Mary may have unknowingly trespassed on a ceremonial ground reserved for adult men. The visiting men attacked, killing Ah Leung and wounding Ah Sam. After the attack, accompanied by her child and Ah Sam, Mary attempted to flee to the mainland in an iron boiling tank used for boiling sea cucumber, a large rectangular tub. The vessel floated away from the coast and all three died of thirst nine days later on the waterless No 5 Howick Island. Their bodies were found three months later along with Mary Watson's diary. The boiling tank can be seen in the Queensland Museum, and the State Library of Queensland holds two diaries by Mrs Watson. One is about her last nine months on Lizard Island, and the other comprises notes documenting her last days.

In retaliation for the attack, a punitive expedition was mounted against Aboriginal peoples, and many innocent Aboriginal people were massacred in retribution, a part which has often been left out of the story. This devastated Aboriginal communities and their traditional economies in the region, which had already been affected by expanding agriculture and the discovery of gold, leading to the establishment of Cooktown in 1873. In 1886 the first Aboriginal mission was established at Elim Aboriginal Mission by German Lutherans. The mission, along with Cape Bedford Mission, was the foundation of the present Hope Vale settlement, where many Dingaal people continue to reside.

In 1939, all of the islands in the group were declared a national park.

The Lizard Island Research Station was established by the Australian Museum in 1973, the waters surrounding the island were declared a marine park in 1974, and Lizard Island Resort opened in 1975.

In 2014, the resort was damaged by Cyclone Ita, and had to close for repairs.

Suzanne Rees, an 80-year old passenger of the cruise ship Coral Adventurer, was found dead on Lizard Island on 26 October 2025, after her ship left her behind on the island. She had left the Coral Adventurer for a hike to Cook's Look, but felt ill and was instructed to return to the ship alone.

== Geology and geography ==
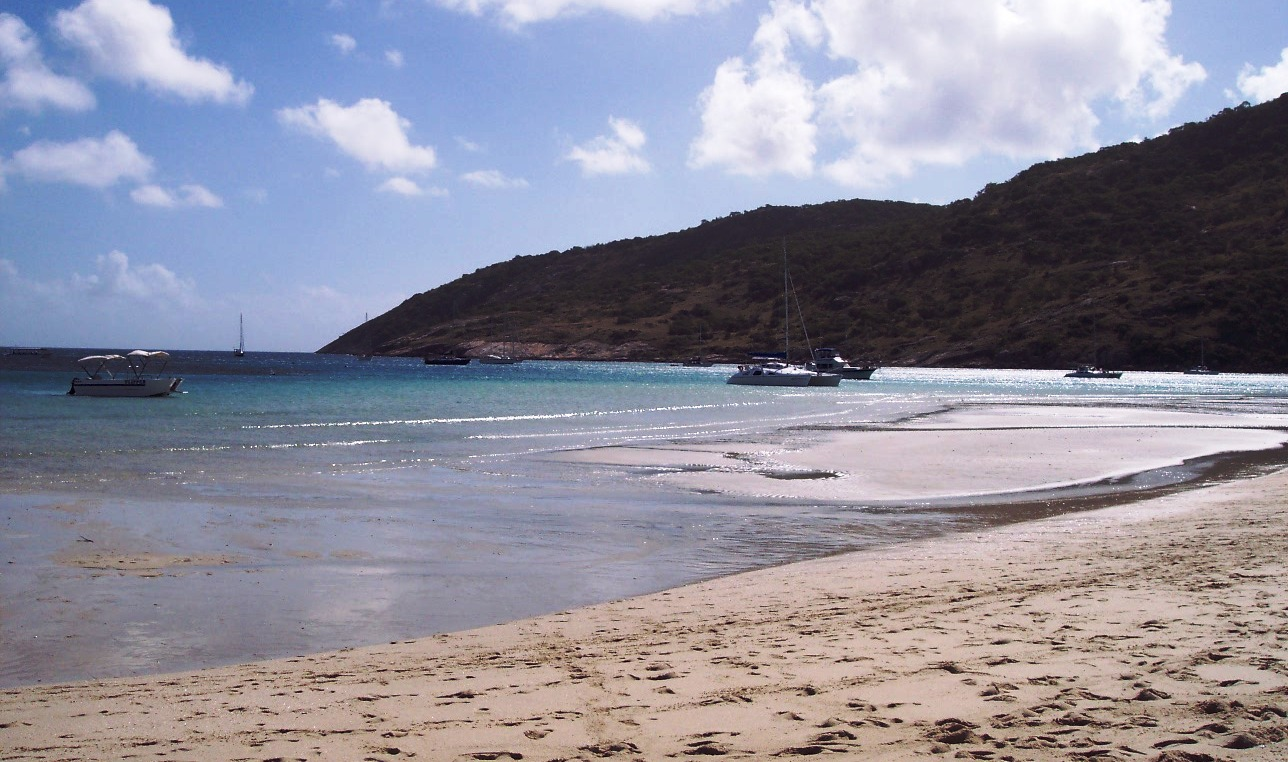
Lizard Island beach

Lizard Island is located in the northern part of the Great Barrier Reef, 27 km (17 mi) directly off the mainland, north of Cooktown and Cape Flattery. It is a granite island about 10 km^{2} (3.9 sq mi) in size, with three smaller islands nearby (Palfrey, South and Bird). Together these islands form the Lizard Island Group, and their well-developed fringing reef encircles the 10-metre (33 ft) deep Blue Lagoon. The highest point is Cook's Look, 370 m (1,210 ft) above sea level.

It is a continental island, once around 20 km (12 mi) inland and separated after the post-Pleistocene flooding, around 7000 years ago. It was created mostly by an orogenic pluton of porphyritic biotite and muscovite, formed during the Permian age around 300 million years ago.

There are many beaches on the island, including Mangrove Beach, Freshwater Beach (also known as One Tree Coconut Beach), Watson's Beach, and Casuarina Beach.

== Archaeology ==
The oldest occupation layers on the island date to 6510–5790 cal BP, which shows that Jiigurru was the earliest offshore island occupied on the northern part of the Great Barrier Reef. There are numerous shell middens, stone arrangements, and art sites on the island, showing signs of occupation of the island for thousands of years. In the 1990s, two Aboriginal rock art sites were observed in rockshelters formed by large granite boulders, in which red ochre was used.

=== Site 17 ===
Site 17 is an archaeological site located on a hill above Freshwater Beach (also known as One Tree Coconut Beach) of Lizard Island, which was found to contain granite-derived, quartz sand temper. The midden is quite large, covering a total area of 7,000 m^{2} (75,000 sq ft). Site 17 was first observed by Jim Specht in 1978–9, then excavated by Robynne Mills in 1992. The site was further excavated by a team including Specht in 2009, who created a 100 cm (39 in) X 50 cm (20 in) x 150 cm (59 in) trench, and identified six stratigraphic layers. It was observed through radiocarbon dating that the basal layer (6) produced a range of 3358–2929 cal BP on charcoal found at the 120–130 cm (47–51 in) depth. In October 2009 Lentfer, Specht, and a representative of the Dingaal people, Johnathan Charlie, began excavating a new trench 2 m (6 ft 7 in) east of Mills trench. This new trench was 60 cm (24 in) x 40 cm (16 in) x 140 cm (55 in), and showed six layers of stratigraphy similar to Mills trench. There were recovered pieces of quartz, granite, and pumice discovered from the basal levels of layer number 6, which using radiocarbon dating were dated to be from 3815 to 3571 cal BP to 3206–2959 cal BP.

=== Mangrove Beach ===
In 2006, New Zealand archaeologist Matthew Felgate found pottery in an intertidal zone by chance when he was on holiday on the island, on Mangrove Beach. This was the first pottery found, and was reported in a 2010 study by Felgate; however, it could not be reliably dated at that time. Later, Sean Ulm, distinguished professor at James Cook University, and Ian J. McNiven, professor at Monash University, both of whom were operating under the auspices of the Australian Research Council Centre of Excellence for Australian Biodiversity and Heritage (CABAH), co-led a team including Kenneth McLean, chair of Walmbaar Aboriginal Corporation, and other members of the Dingaal and Ngurrumungu communities, that excavated several more pieces of pottery from the site in 2009, 2010, and 2012. Initial analysis showed local materials were used in the manufacture. However, the age of the pottery could not be established.

The Ulm team revisited Jiigurru and excavated a shell midden not far from the pottery site, discovering that the site had been settled at least 4,000 years previously, but no pottery was found. The same team started working with the Indigenous owners and excavated a different midden and found a lot of pottery. Digging deeper, cultural material was found nearly 2 m (6 ft 7 in) metres below ground level, which was radiocarbon-dated to around 6,500 years ago; the earliest evidence of use of an island on the northern Great Barrier Reef. The resulting study, published in April 2024 and involving many scientists, working with traditional owners, determined that sherds found on the island were the oldest securely dated ceramics found in Australia. The data showed that local raw materials were used and that the pottery was made on the island, which showed that the people who lived there were involved in the ancient maritime networks in the vicinity, including the possession of sophisticated canoe travel technology and skills in navigating on the ocean, which enabled them to connect with other peoples across the Coral Sea. The dating showed that it was created between 2950–2545 cal BP and 1970–1815 cal BP, which overlaps with the late Lapita and post-Lapita traditions of southern Papua New Guinea. Co-author Quan Hua of ANSTO is an expert in radiocarbon dating. The significance of the study lies in the fact that it is the first pottery in Australia to have been found and reliably dated, and that it shows that the people of Australia were not geographically isolated, but involved with other seafaring peoples. There is conclusive evidence that the pottery is not of Lapita origin, and it is also proof of continuous seasonal occupation of the island by Aboriginal people. It is not known by newer sherds were not found on that site, and further research is necessary. There has been a paucity of research done on the eastern side of Cape York Peninsula.

== Governance ==
Lizard Island is within the locality of Lizard in the Cook Shire.

Lizard Island National Park is administered by the Queensland Parks and Wildlife Service (Parks and Forests).

The island is also part of the Great Barrier Reef Marine Park, administered jointly by the Great Barrier Reef Marine Park Authority and the Queensland Environmental Protection Agency. Permits are required for all manipulative research in the Lizard Island Group and the waters surrounding it.

== Heritage listings ==
Lizard Island has a number of heritage-listed sites, including Mrs Watson's Cottage.

== Flora and fauna ==
=== Plant species ===
As the sea level rose in the early Holocene, resulting in the isolation of Lizard Island, mangrove forest gradually became established in place of the near-coastal palms and grasses. There are a number of distinct plant communities, mainly Themeda australis and Arundinella nepalensis (a low grass), and some small patches of rainforest and semi-deciduous notophyll (dry rainforest). There is some woodland consisting of mainly Acacia crassicarpa and some Eucalyptus tessellaris, along with shrubs such as Thryptomene oligandra and swamplands of pandanus. Along the coastal dune there is strand vegetation.

=== Animals ===
The waters around the island contain a number of coral reefs. Climate change is causing the reefs to suffer coral bleaching, in the summer of early 2024 over 97% of some reefs around the island died.

==== Reptiles ====
As of 2009 there were 11 species of lizards on the island. The most commonly found lizard is the yellow-spotted monitor (Varanus panoptes). Skinks and geckos are among some of the other reptiles roaming Lizard Island. The lowlands bar-lipped skink (Eremiascincus pardalis) and the sandy rainbow-skink (Carlia dogare) are endemic species of Queensland found on this island. The Chevert gecko (Nactus cheverti) is the only gecko on the island that's only endemic to Queensland. Pythons and tree snakes are common while the most dangerous snake on the island, the brown-headed snake (Furina tristis), is rarely seen. Green marine turtles (Chelonia mydas) and loggerhead marine turtles (Caretta caretta) can be seen nesting on the island in the summer and are often spotted in the shallow water.

==== Birds ====
There are over 40 species of birds that reside on or visit Lizard Island. Only about 20 species nest on the island, including terns. The island is home to many land and sea birds including the bar-shouldered dove (Geopelia humeralis), pheasant coucal (Centropus phasianinus), yellow-bellied sunbird (Nectarinia jugularis), white-bellied sea-eagle (Haliaeetus leucogaster), and osprey (Pandion cristatus). Seasonal birds such as white-tailed tropicbird (Phaethon lepturus) and dollarbird (Eurystomus orientalis) also appear on the island.

==== Mammals ====
Lizard Island is home to a few bat species, but the most common is the Black flying-foxes (Pteropus alecto). They typically roam around the island and congregate in the mangroves. Black flying-foxes will fly to the mainland when flowering is poor. Eastern Dusky Leaf-nosed Bat (Hipposideros ater) have also been spotted on the island.

Until 2009, Lizard Island had no native rodents recorded. In October 2009, water rats (Hydromys chrysogaster) were spotted on the island and steadily increased in population until 2012. In 2010, Cape York mosaic-tailed rat (Melomys capensis) were spotted in South Island, marked as the first native rodent to the island chain.

==== Crustaceans ====
Species of stomatopod crustaceans are found here, with much biomechanical research being conducted on them. A notable species found near Lizard Island is Alachosquilla vicina.

== Current settlement and use ==
Aside from the national park, Lizard Island also contains a number of other facilities:

=== Lizard Island Research Station ===
Research performed at Lizard Island Research Station includes investigations into the reproduction of the cauliflower coral, Pocillopora meandrina.

Situated on Lizard Island's most westerly point, the Lizard Island Research Station (LIRS) was established in 1973 by ichthyologist and marine biologist Frank Talbot, then director of the Australian Museum. It continues to be operated by the museum, providing research and education facilities for those interested in studying coral reefs. LIRS is part of the Australian Museum Research Institute (AMRI), headed by Kris Helgen.

As of November 2024, Anne Hoggett and Lyle Vail were co-directors of LIRS.

As a result of research conducted at the station, about 1,000 scientific publications had been produced by Australian and international researchers as of 2008.

=== Lizard Island Resort ===
On the island's north western side is an ultra luxury resort owned by Hong Kong listed property company Sea Holdings. In December 1997, the island was purchased by P&O, before being sold to Voyages Hotels & Resorts in July 2004. It was later operated by Delaware North.

== See also ==
- Lizard Island Airport
- Protected areas of Queensland
