= Transversotrematidae =

Scientific classification
- Kingdom: Animalia
- Phylum: Platyhelminthes
- Class: Trematoda
- Order: Plagiorchiida
- Suborder: Transversotremata; Olson, Cribb, Tkach, Bray & Littlewood, 2003
- Superfamily: Transversotrematoidea; Witenberg, 1944
- Family: Transversotrematidae; Witenberg, 1944

Family of flukes

Transversotrematidae is a family of trematodes in the order Plagiorchiida. It is the only family in the superfamily Transversotrematoidea, which is the only superfamily in the suborder Transversotremata. It has been synonymised with Circuitiocoeliidae Wang, 1981, Squamacolidae Pan & Wang, 1985, and Transversotrematinae Witenberg, 1944.

== Genera ==
- Circuitiocoelium Wang, 1981
- Crusziella Cribb, Bray & Barker, 1992
- Prototransversotrema Angel, 1969
- Transversotrema Witenberg, 1944
