= Musgrave Telegraph Station =

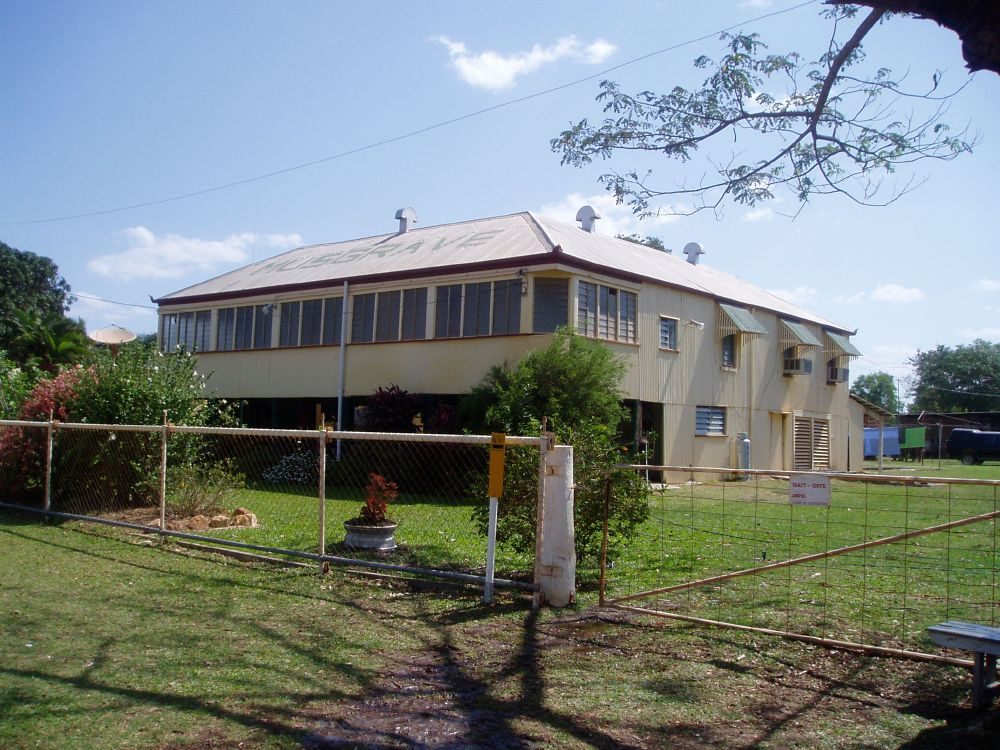
- Musgrave Telegraph Station (now road house), 2003

- Location within Queensland Location within Australia
- 14.7825°S 143.4847°E
- Location: Peninsula Developmental Road, Yarraden, Shire of Cook, Queensland, Australia

Queensland Heritage Register
- Official name: Musgrave Telegraph Station (former)
- Type: state heritage
- Designated: 21 August 1992
- Reference no.: 600431

Musgrave Telegraph Station is a heritage-listed former telegraph station and now roadhouse at Peninsula Developmental Road, Musgrave, Yarraden, Shire of Cook, Queensland, Australia. It is also known as Musgrave Roadhouse. It was added to the Queensland Heritage Register on 21 August 1992.

== History ==
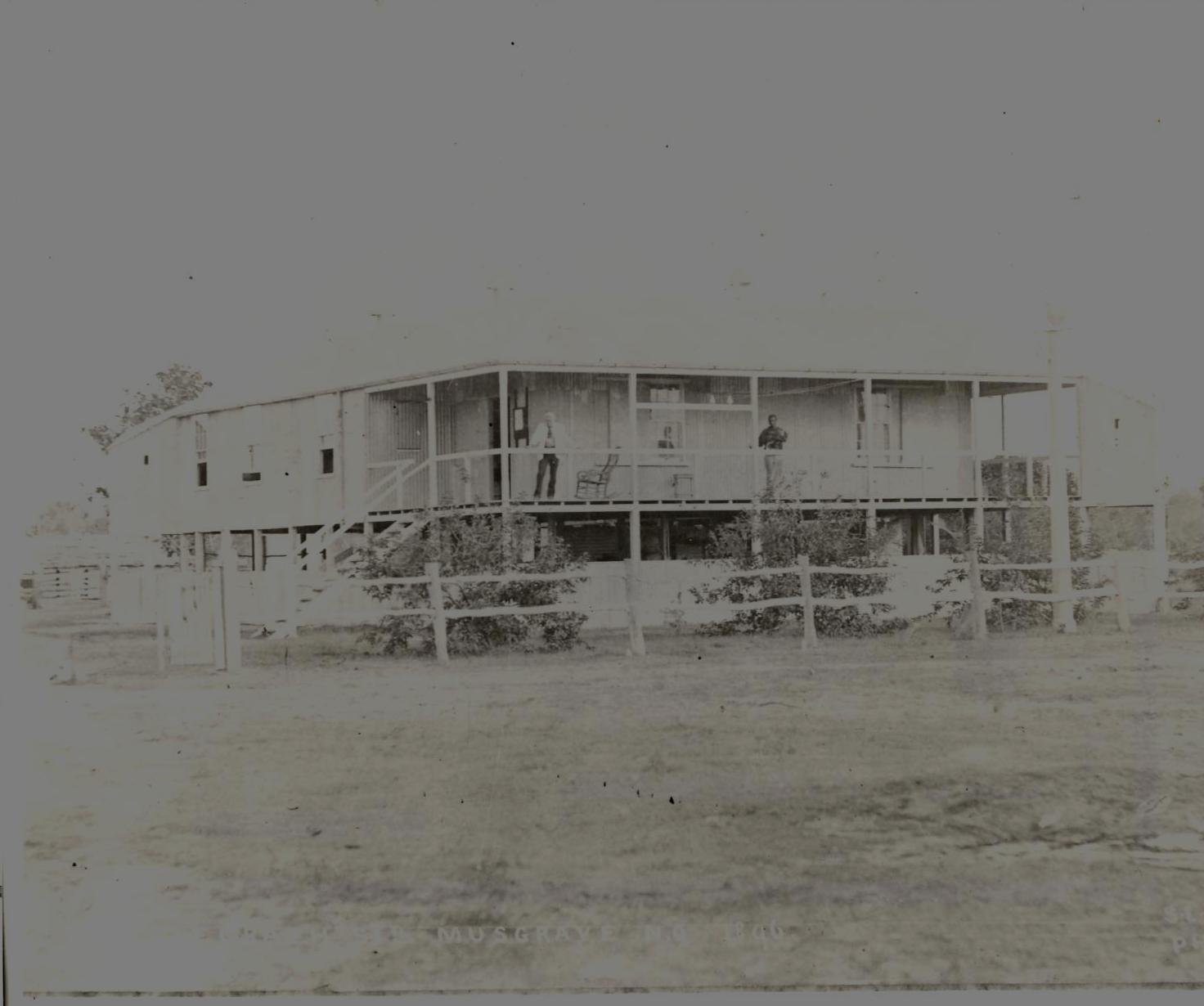
Musgrave Telegraph Station, 1896

The Musgrave Telegraph Office, named in honour of the then governor of Queensland, Sir Anthony Musgrave, was erected in 1886 and commenced operation on 23 December that year. It was constructed in association with the important overland Cape York Telegraph Line from Laura, at the southern end of Cape York Peninsula, to Thursday Island in the Torres Strait. This is considered one of the outstanding achievements in the development of Queensland's colonial telegraph network.

The line was explored and surveyed in 1883 by John Richard Bradford, inspector of lines and mail route services from 1882 to 1895, later appointed electrical engineer for Queensland. The first section of the line, 200 miles (320 km) from Laura to Mein (13.200°S 142.816°E, now in Archer River), was completed on 13 October 1886. The second section, 192.5 miles (309.8 km), from Mein to Paterson (10.802°S 142.401°E, now in New Mapoon) was completed on 18 August 1887. The line consisted of one 400 pounds (180 kg) to the mile galvanised iron wire mounted on the apex of a steel Oppenheimer pole imported from England. The cable from Paterson to Thursday Island was completed in November 1886, but the Thursday Island Telegraph Office did not open until 25 August 1887.

The overland telegraph provided important contact between the isolated communities of the peninsula, as well as a link to southern capitals via Cooktown, and played a significant role in the development of the region. The expansion of telegraphic communication on the peninsula was also an integral element of Brisbane's administrative control of far north Queensland and of communication with British-annexed southern New Guinea (Queensland had annexed southern New Guinea in 1883, but this was revoked by Britain, which annexed the territory itself in 1885) and the Torres Strait (included as Queensland territory from 1879), and in the late 19th century was considered important for the defence of Queensland. It also delineated the major overland axis north through Cape York, and today the Peninsula Developmental Road and Bamaga Road follow much of the route of the 1880s telegraph line. During the Second World War the overland telegraph line was upgraded and provided the principal communications link for the Allied offensive in New Guinea. Although a dedicated defence facility, the wartime upgrade was linked directly to the 1880s overland telegraph.

In the period 1884–1887, the Queensland Department of Posts and Telegraph erected seven timber-framed, corrugated-iron clad telegraph offices associated with the construction of the Cape York Telegraph Line. These were designed in the office of the Queensland Colonial Architect, pre-cut in Brisbane for assembly on site, and erected at Fairview, Musgrave, Coen, Mein, Moreton, McDonnell, and Paterson. It is likely the Thursday Island Telegraph Office opened in an existing post office. Unlike other telegraph offices, those on the Cape York line were designed to provide protection from attack by Aborigines, and included sliding shutters on the front verandah windows, an internal verandah for the quarters, gun posts at diagonally opposite corners of the verandahs, an enclosure for water tanks under the building (which was elevated on high stumps), and a corrugated iron fence surrounding the yard. Later, once the perceived threat from Aborigines had passed, the gun posts were used as bathrooms, or removed. With the exception of the Musgrave Telegraph Office, which is now part of the Musgrave Roadhouse complex, all the other Cape York Telegraph Line offices have been demolished.

There are two graves at the Musgrave Telegraph Station associated with post and telegraph workers. Lineman-in-charge at Musgrave, Sam Thompson, was killed in a fall from a horse in late December 1918 or early January 1919, and was buried beneath a mango tree near the station. Billie Biernes, a mail contractor who died at Musgrave after he retired there, was buried nearby. Both these men were local identities.

On 22 June 1929, telegraph facilities at Musgrave, Mein and McDonnell were closed. Telegraph officers and linemen were withdrawn and the buildings were sold by the Commonwealth Government, which had taken over post and telegraph responsibilities after Federation. The former Musgrave Telegraph Office remained in situ and was used as a station homestead.

== Description ==
The former Musgrave Telegraph Station (now known as the Musgrave Roadhouse) is located along the Peninsula Developmental Road at the intersection with Lilyvale Road in the Cape York Peninsula, approximately halfway between Cairns and Weipa and 136 kilometres (85 mi) north of Laura. The former station complex consists of a number of buildings and structures dating from a range of periods, the most significant of which are the original Telegraph Office building (1886, with later alterations), an original butchers shop (date unknown) and a remaining telegraph pole. The former Office building faces east and is located near the centre of the eastern boundary of the complex. A wide strip of cleared land, used as car parking space and forming the southern end of an airstrip, lies between the complex and the Peninsula Developmental Road. Adjacent to the south-east corner of this area is a mature Mango tree (possibly of early date) near which two early graves are located. This tree and the graves are also considered to be of cultural heritage significance.

The former Musgrave Telegraph Office is a high-set, timber-framed building with a corrugated metal-clad hipped roof over a U-shaped plan, and supported on substantial timber stumps. The undercroft has been partially enclosed and the central courtyard roofed. Access to the raised floor level is via a staircase located at the rear of the building. This floor features an enclosed verandah on its eastern side that wraps around the north-east and south-east corners.

The main elevation is unenclosed at ground level with a garden laid out in front of the line of timber stumps. The enclosed first floor verandah is clad in flat sheeting to sill height with a continuous bank of glass-louvered windows above. The north-east corner of the verandah is chamfered, marking the position of the original gun-post enclosure. The name "MUSGRAVE" is discernable on the roof, painted in large green lettering. Three windows with individual hoods open out of the western facade of the upper floor, which appears to be clad in corrugated iron sheeting.

A metal pole and cyclone wire fence bounds the front of the property in approximately the same location as earlier fences (according to early photographs). A remaining telegraph pole stands just behind this fence, roughly centered on the eastern facade of the former Office building.

The butcher shop appears to be located to the west of the former Telegraph Office. It is a single-storey, square, timber structure consisting of a corrugated iron-clad hipped roof supported on thick timber posts. It features an enclosed room in the centre and a concrete slab floor.

Several mature trees remain over the end of the allotment addressing the road. The very large Mango tree at the south-east corner of the parking area acts as an entrance marker for the Station.

Two early graves are in the vicinity of the Mango tree: a marked one beneath the canopy belonging to Sam Thompson, a linesman who died in 1919; and approximately 25 metres (82 ft) north of this spot, within the cleared parking area, is a slightly raised gravel patch measuring about 3 by 2 metres (9.8 ft × 6.6 ft) in plan that is believed to be the otherwise unmarked grave of Billy Beirne(s), an early pioneer stockman and pack- horseman of the area.

The extremely remote location of the station means that the property is surrounded by natural vegetation and no other residences or buildings. The Peninsula Developmental Road remained unsealed in the late 2000s.

== Heritage listing ==
The former Musgrave Telegraph Station was listed on the Queensland Heritage Register on 21 August 1992 having satisfied the following criteria.

The place is important in demonstrating the evolution or pattern of Queensland's history.

Completed in 1886, the former Musgrave Telegraph Station is an important remnant of the infrastructure that supported the overland Cape York Telegraph Line connecting Brisbane with the northern extremities of the colony of Queensland during the mid to late1880s. The line contributed significantly to the expanding economy of northern Queensland; while no longer in use its course has been impressed upon the landscape via the length of much of the Peninsula Developmental Road as well as the location of the former Musgrave Telegraph Station.

The place demonstrates rare, uncommon or endangered aspects of Queensland's cultural heritage.

Of the seven purpose-built telegraph offices constructed by the Queensland Department of Posts and Telegraph between 1884 and 1887 to service the overland Cape York Telegraph Line, which stretched from Laura at the southern end of the Cape York Peninsula to Thursday Island in the Torres Strait, that built at Musgrave in 1886 is the only one extant; making it rare evidence of what was once a vital communication link.
