= Ebagoola Township and Battery =

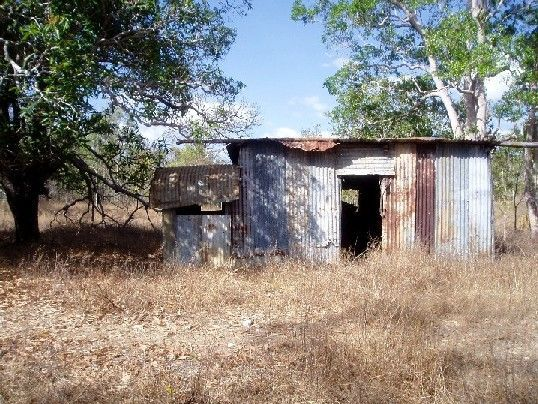
- Last surviving building in Ebagoola

- Location within Queensland Location within Australia
- 14.3016°S 143.2641°E
- Location: Yarraden, Shire of Cook, Queensland, Australia

History
- Design period: 1900 – 1914 (early 20th century)
- Built: 1900–1913

Queensland Heritage Register
- Official name: Ebagoola Township and Battery, Ada Stewart Battery, Ebagoolah Township
- Type: state heritage (archaeological, built)
- Designated: 15 May 2006
- Reference no.: 601858
- Significant period: 1900-1910s (fabric); 1900–1913 (historical mining period)
- Significant components: hut/shack, plantings – exotic, trees/plantings, alluvial workings, mounting block/stand, workings – shallow, terracing, machinery/plant/equipment – transport – road, mullock heap, machinery/plant/equipment – mining/mineral processing

Ebagoola Township and Battery is a heritage-listed mining camp at Yarraden, Shire of Cook, Queensland, Australia. It was built from 1900 to 1913. It is also known as Ada Stewart Battery and Ebagoolah Township. It was added to the Queensland Heritage Register on 15 May 2006.

== History ==
The township of Ebagoola was situated on the Hamilton Goldfield on the western fall of the McIllwraith Range, on Cape York Peninsula. The goldfield, named after the Member of Queensland Legislative Assembly for Cook, gold miner/investor John Hamilton, was proclaimed on 13 July 1900 following prospector John Dickie's report of gold in the area in January 1900.

Alluvial gold had been discovered on the Cape York Peninsula as early as 1876, on the Coen River, after the Palmer River goldfield drew attention to the region. A small rush ensued in 1878. Although this soon dissipated, by the late 1880s a small township had been formed at Coen. In 1892 the Coen Goldfield was proclaimed officially and reefing work commenced. Although production totals paled in comparison with fields such as the Palmer, within the next few years the erection of batteries and a cyanide works at Coen gave the northern Peninsula a permanent base for prospecting expeditions. Gold was found on the Starcke River in 1890, at Batavia (Wenlock) in 1892, Ebagoola in 1899 and Potallah in 1902.

The township of Ebagoola was surveyed in September 1900 to service the newly proclaimed Hamilton Goldfield. The first Ebagoola camp was near the site of Dickie's discovery, but the surveyed town was located a mile to the north at the northern end of the field.

The majority of surveyed allotments were quickly purchased and a number of small businesses were established. Characteristic of new mining towns, these included a butchery (the first business established on the field), a general store and a hotel. These buildings were rudimentary, slab-walled structures with roofs clad with bark sheets held down by saplings, canvas over a ridge pole, and iron sheeting.

By November 1900 the population of the field was estimated at 330, of whom 130 were alluvial miners, 100 quartz miners, 50 businessmen and non-miners, and 50 women and children. Fever, dysentery and eye trouble were prevalent in the last part of the year, due to the lack of clean well water. By the end of 1900, as a measure of confidence in the place, three large hotels and several substantial stores had been built, and dwellings were being erected as fast as building material could be obtained. Reserves had been laid out for Government buildings and the hospital on a mound at the northern end of town. The town was serviced by a post office from 1900 to 1917 and a school operated from 1905 to 1914.

As mining and ore treatment intensified on the field, Ebagoola township developed rapidly in the early 1900s. New businesses included two cordial manufacturers, a chemist, baker, two barbers, two blacksmiths, a confectioner, tobacconist, dressmaker, two auctioneers, commission agent and an accountant. There was also a tent hospital run by the chemist's wife, and a coach service from Ebagoola to Port Stewart, the closest port, about 60 kilometres (37 mi) east and about 240 kilometres (150 mi) north of Cooktown. The first gold-bearing ore from the Hamilton field had to be sent to Coen, about 40 kilometres (25 mi) north, for crushing. By November 1900 there was only one 5-head stamper battery on the Hamilton field, and that was poorly equipped. It serviced the output of fifty mines and floods had caused its closure for 12 weeks at the beginning of 1901. However, the official return of gold for 1900 was 806 ounces (22,800 g) of reef gold and 12,000 ounces (340,000 g) of alluvial, valued at £35,258.

At the end of 1900 the 10-head Ada Stewart battery at Coen was relocated to Ebagoola, in time to crush ore during the wet season. A third battery was established on the field soon after.

Intensive mining activity in the Ebagoola district proved to be of short duration. Within a decade, the mines were closing. In 1907 the Pioneer battery was moved to the nearby Lukin field and in the same year the Ada Stewart battery changed ownership, and again in 1910. From 1909 to 1913 Berryman and Pool cyanided the Ada Stewart battery sands.

By 1910 the population of the field was recorded as 101, less than a third of the estimated population of late 1900. All the mines at Ebagoola had closed by 1913 and the town was practically deserted by the start of World War I (August 1914), with only one hotel, the Hamilton, still operating. By 1924 there were only a few fossickers getting very little gold. Tom Miller, the last resident of Ebagoola, died in 1958 and his corrugated iron hut remains, as do early tree plantings and street alignments.

== Description ==
The Ebagoola Township Site and Ada Stewart Battery is located 40 kilometres (25 mi) south of Coen and about 6 kilometres (3.7 mi) west of the Peninsula Developmental Road. The homestead of Yarraden pastoral station is located nearby.

The place occupies a mostly flat area of land and is bounded on its southern side by a disused airstrip. A small hill (known as 'Hospital Hill') is located at the northeast corner of the site, about 400 metres (1,300 ft) northeast of the battery. To the east and west of the site boundary, are two intermittent creeks. The vegetation cover is predominantly grassland and open Eucalyptus spp regrowth, except for the main township area. Open melaleuca forest is evident along the entire western boundary following the course of a dry creek bed. Cattle graze the place, particularly the site of the main Ebagoola township, which remains cleared.

=== Ada Stewart Battery ===
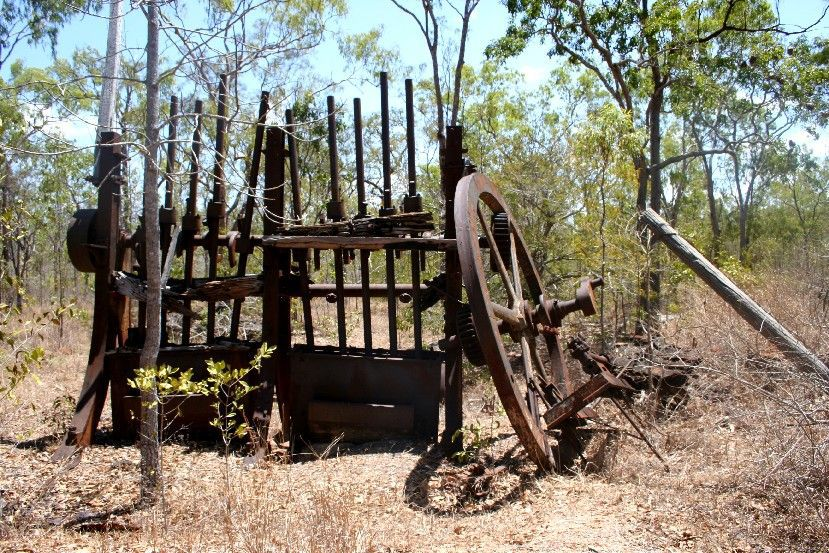
Stamper battery

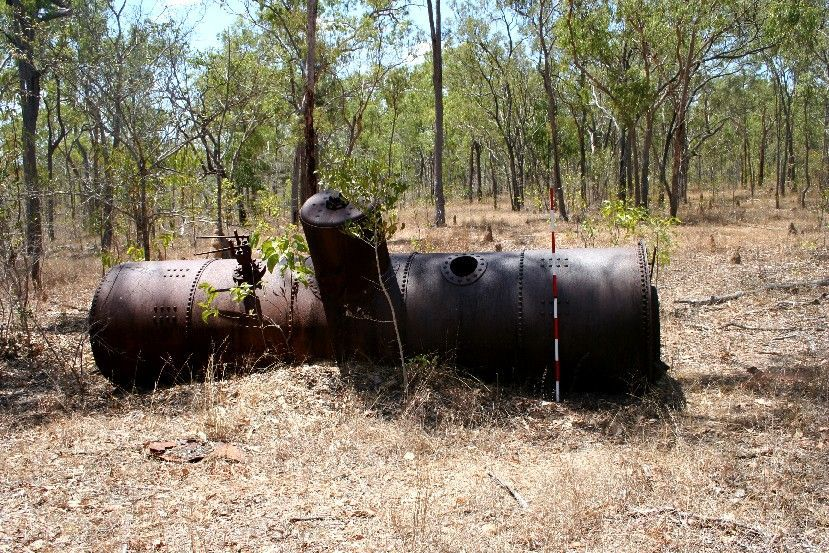
Cornish boiler

The battery is located about 500 metres (1,600 ft) north of Ebagoola township and within Lot 8 on E5146. The components of the battery comprise an almost intact three standard steel stamper frame with ten head of stamps in two mortar boxes. The battery is set in compacted clay foundations and as a result of vibration the frame contains a number of major cracks, which have been subjected to makeshift repairs. The body of a single-cylinder flat-bed steam engine is located alongside. The engine has been broken into two sections and the large flywheel has been placed against the stamper frame. Remains of a brick mounting for a Cornish boiler are adjacent to the engine. The boiler, which now lies several metres away, is of an early type.

The battery outflow and mill area below the boxes comprises a shallow excavated bench with collapsed belt wheels and a removed camshaft. The only surviving item of secondary processing plant is a grinding pan, which is not in situ. Other items of plant lying around the site include another belt shaft and wheels, a duplex pump, and the body of a smaller grinding pan. An extensive area of tailings extends west from the battery to the creek.

The surviving plant consists of:

- Ten head stamp battery with two 5 stamp mortar boxes – Lallal Iron Coy. Foundry Ballarat (on one mortar box)
- Cornish boiler – no brand (firedoors removed)
- Grinding pan (not in situ) – Langlands Foundry Limited Melbourne
- One-cylinder rocking shaft reversing steam engine – no brand
- Duplex steam pump (not in situ) – no brand
- Grinding pan (not in situ) – no brand.

=== Ebagoola Township Site ===
The main area of the township site extends for approximately 250 metres (820 ft) on the eastern side and approximately 50 metres (160 ft) on the western side of a station track, which aligns approximately with a section of the former main street of Ebagoola Township (McDonald Street). The area remains cleared of low level vegetation and contains numerous stands of exotic trees including mature mango trees, tamarinds and several date palms. Apart from scattered sheets of corrugated iron and timber stumps there is little surface evidence of buildings. A survey peg marked "EK28" demarcates the northern end of the visible remnants of the former township.

On western side of the station track and to the south of the survey peg, are indications of former building and habitation sites. Timber stumps, corrugated iron sheeting and piles of roughly cut timber are concentrated in places here and in other areas within the main township area. These remnants are found in close association with exotic trees, usually mangoes. Other notable features within the township area are a number of bottle and rubbish dumpsites, the remains of an old dray or wagon and cattle yard fencing.

The only surviving building within the site of the former township is a small corrugated iron hut in the south of the main township area and about 450 metres (1,480 ft) south of the survey peg (about 830 metres (2,720 ft) southeast of the battery area). This hut was formerly owned by Tom Miller who died in 1958, and was occupied until recently by Christie Steenson of Coen. An open lean-to living area attached to the front of the hut has been removed. The interior is intact, partly furnished (including built-in bush timber shelving and a gas refrigerator of an early type) and in fair condition, although there is evidence of termite activity. A grove of mature mango trees, glass, metal and other artefact scatters are evident in close proximity to the hut site. A metal drum, sunk into the ground about 10 metres (33 ft) northeast of the hut, is probably the remains of a toilet. Two stone piles are situated about 12 metres (39 ft) east of the hut.

Extending south from the hut is evidence of a concrete platform or floor and a line of three thickset low timber stumps. Further south of the concrete platform is the remains of a corrugated iron tank, however this does not appear to be in situ.

In addition to the remains within the township area, a building and/or dwelling site is located approximately 150 metres (490 ft) northeast of the battery area, at the western foot of Hospital Hill. This site consists of a group of features including a number of large timber stumps (lying on the ground), several glass scatters, two gateposts, and a large, near- dead Frangipani tree. Two culturally modified trees, thought to be the result of steel axe cuts, are also evident in this vicinity.

=== Workings ===
An extensive area of shallow workings extends for approximately 1 kilometre (0.62 mi) along the western fringes of the gazetted township site from the southwest corner to the battery area in the north. This heavily worked area stretches about 130 metres (430 ft) to the east in the direction of the station track (McDonald Street). The area is typified by numerous shallow pits and ditches, mullock dumps, machinery, and other metal remains. The most visible feature within this extensive worked area is a 6 metres (20 ft) high mullock dump found in close association to a concentrated group of shallow workings and machinery parts. This concentration of workings has a diameter of about 50 metres (160 ft) and includes a broken piece of machinery inscribed with "This end toward the pump" and an almost intact vertical boiler complete with fire door and valve handle.

East of the main township area, on the western side and bed of a creek/gully, is a widespread and structureless area of alluvial diggings. This creek/gully aligns with the eastern boundary line of the site.

In the southeast of the site, along a fence line forming the site's southern boundary, is a worked area consisting of shallow pits and mullock dumps.

== Heritage listing ==
Ebagoola Township and Battery was listed on the Queensland Heritage Register on 15 May 2006 having satisfied the following criteria.

The place is important in demonstrating the evolution or pattern of Queensland's history.

Ebagoola Township Site, established in 1900, is significant in demonstrating the evolution of mining settlements on the remote Cape York Peninsula. After a decade of activity the population dwindled and dwellings were removed, leaving the street alignments and allotments identified by plantings of mangoes and date palms, which are significant in marking the township site today. The combination of the Ada Stewart Battery, remnant workings (both reef and alluvial) and nearby Ebagoola Township Site is important in demonstrating the development of the Hamilton Goldfield, and of small scale but intensive gold mining activity in far north Queensland, in the early 1900s. The Ada Stewart Battery at Ebagoola is significant because it demonstrates the need for reliable crushing batteries on remote goldfields to enable mining to proceed. Its presence on the Hamilton field also demonstrates a typical pattern of moving plant from field to field in response to new economic opportunities, in this case from Coen to Ebagoola.

The place demonstrates rare, uncommon or endangered aspects of Queensland's cultural heritage.

Major items of plant are significant. The flat-bed engine is rare though now broken. The 10 head battery is one of only two intact 10 head stamp batteries recorded in Cook Shire, and the only Lallal Iron Foundry product recorded in North Queensland. The form of the only remaining building in the Ebagoola township site, Miller's hut, in such intact condition, is now rare for abandoned mining towns. The surviving combination of reef and alluvial workings, battery and township within such a concise area is quite unusual in Queensland.

The place is important in demonstrating the principal characteristics of a particular class of cultural places.

The spatial layout and remnant fabric and earthworks at the Ebagoola township and Ada Stewart Battery are important in demonstrating the principal characteristics of an early, intensively worked goldfield in far north Queensland. The battery includes a 10-head stamper, Cornish boiler, grinding pans, duplex steam pump, reversing steam engine, associated brick and clay machinery mounts, and tailing sands. The nearby township site consists of dwelling sites and associated materials; stands of date palms and mango trees, the remains of cattle yards, while extensive areas of shallow workings and alluvial workings are found throughout the whole site. Miller's hut in the Ebagoola township site is typical of dwellings in early North Queensland mining camps, although possibly it is of later origin.
