= Musgrave, Queensland =

Musgrave
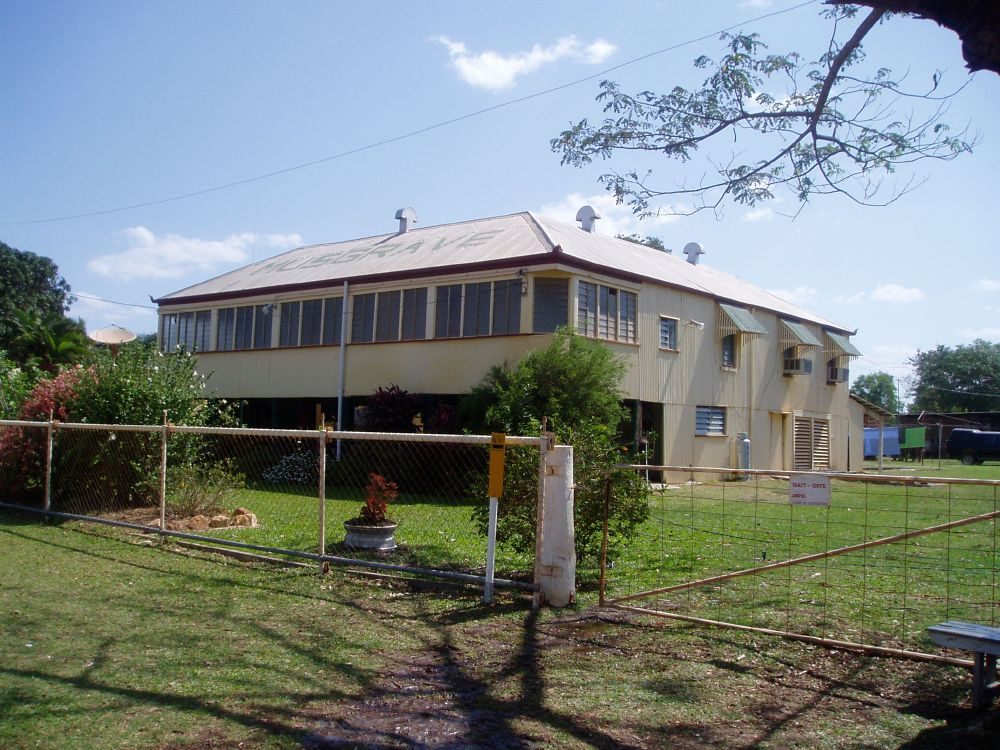
- Former Musgrave Telegraph Station, now Musgrave Roadhouse, 2003

- Coordinates: 14.78077°S 143.50372°E
- Country: Australia
- State: Queensland
- City: Yarraden
- LGA: Shire of Cook
- Location: 280 km (170 mi) NW of Cooktown; 444 km (276 mi) NW of Cairns; 2,128 km (1,322 mi) NNW of Brisbane
- Elevation: 79 m (259 ft)
- Postcode: 4892
- Mean max temp: 32.4 °C (90.3 °F)
- Mean min temp: 18.8 °C (65.8 °F)
- Annual rainfall: 1,176.3 mm (46.31 in)

Musgrave is a neighbourhood in Queensland, Australia. It is within the locality of Yarraden in the local government area of the Shire of Cook. It bordered on the tribal lands of the Yetteneru to the east.

== History ==
The Musgrave Telegraph Office was erected in 1886 and commenced operation on 23 December that year. It was named after the then Governor of Queensland, Sir Anthony Musgrave, It was constructed as one of several telegraph offices on the overland Cape York Telegraph Line from Laura, at the southern end of Cape York Peninsula, to Thursday Island in the Torres Strait. This telegraph was considered one of the outstanding achievements in the development of Queensland's colonial telegraph network

On 22 June 1929, the Musgrave Telegraph Office was closed, but building was reused as a station homestead. It is now part of the Musgrave Roadhouse complex, which serves travellers on the Peninsula Developmental Road.

== Heritage listings ==
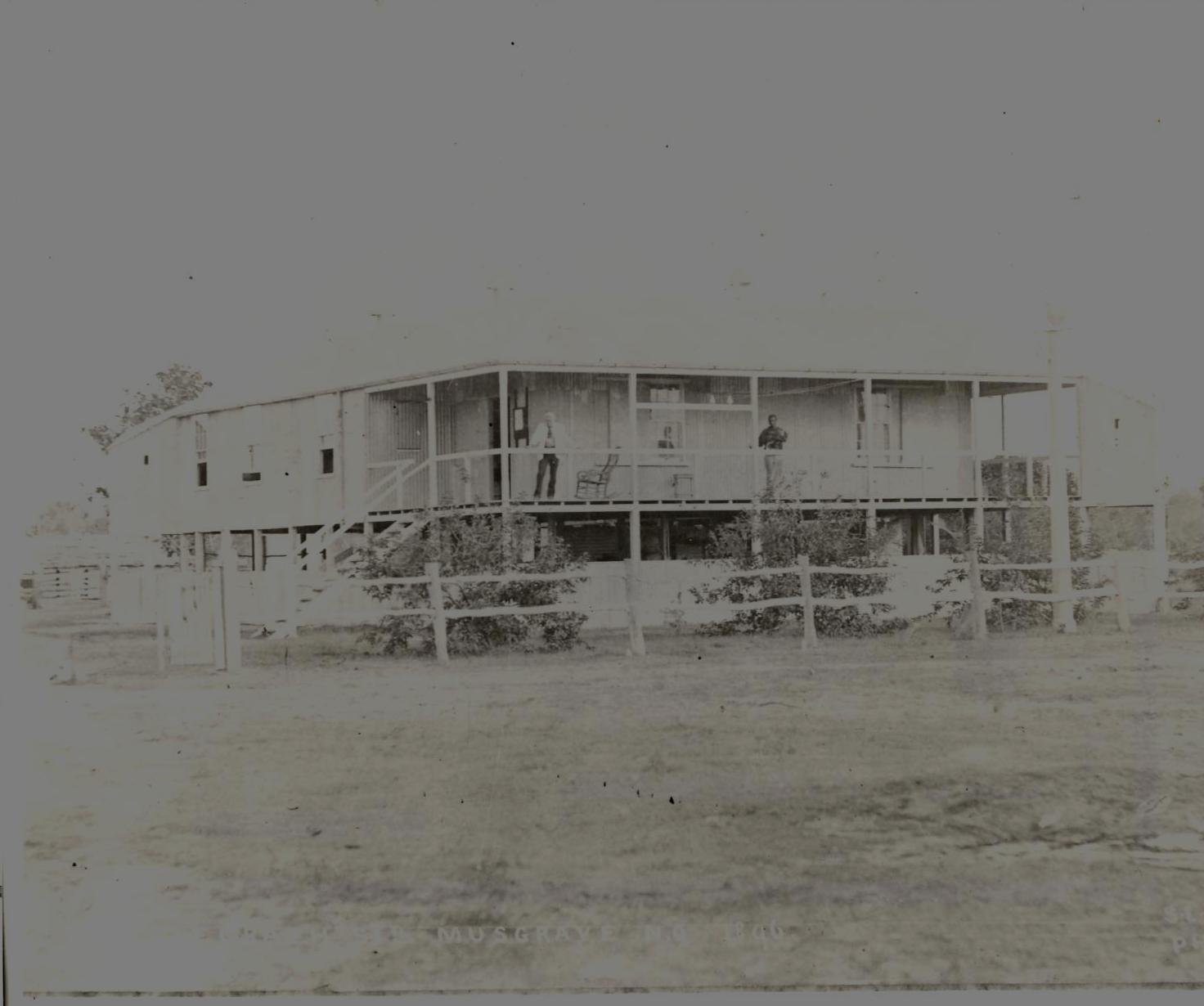
Musgrave Telegraph Station, 1896

Musgrave has a number of heritage-listed sites, including

- Musgrave Telegraph Station, Peninsula Developmental Road (14.7825°S 143.4847°E)

== Geography ==
=== Climate ===
Musgrave has a tropical savanna climate (Köppen: Aw) with a wet season from November to April and a long dry season from May to October. On average, the town experiences 45.8 clear days and 131.0 cloudy days per annum. The wettest recorded day was 17 April 1894 with 348.2 mm (13.71 in) of rainfall. Extreme temperatures ranged from 41.8 °C (107.2 °F) on 1 December 1992 to 2.4 °C (36.3 °F) on 29 July 1996.

Climate data for Musgrave (14.78°S 143.50°E) (79 m (259 ft) AMSL) (1887-2025)
Month	Jan	Feb	Mar	Apr	May	Jun	Jul	Aug	Sep	Oct	Nov	Dec	Year
Record high °C (°F)	39.9 (103.8)	38.0 (100.4)	37.0 (98.6)	35.2 (95.4)	35.0 (95.0)	34.6 (94.3)	34.2 (93.6)	36.4 (97.5)	39.6 (103.3)	40.4 (104.7)	41.0 (105.8)	41.8 (107.2)	41.8 (107.2)
Mean daily maximum °C (°F)	33.2 (91.8)	32.6 (90.7)	32.2 (90.0)	31.7 (89.1)	30.7 (87.3)	29.8 (85.6)	29.7 (85.5)	30.9 (87.6)	33.2 (91.8)	34.6 (94.3)	35.5 (95.9)	34.8 (94.6)	32.4 (90.3)
Mean daily minimum °C (°F)	23.2 (73.8)	23.2 (73.8)	22.4 (72.3)	19.9 (67.8)	17.0 (62.6)	14.9 (58.8)	13.7 (56.7)	13.9 (57.0)	15.7 (60.3)	18.5 (65.3)	20.8 (69.4)	22.7 (72.9)	18.8 (65.9)
Record low °C (°F)	18.0 (64.4)	18.0 (64.4)	17.2 (63.0)	13.6 (56.5)	8.2 (46.8)	5.5 (41.9)	2.4 (36.3)	6.2 (43.2)	6.4 (43.5)	10.8 (51.4)	14.5 (58.1)	16.0 (60.8)	2.4 (36.3)
Average precipitation mm (inches)	271.1 (10.67)	295.2 (11.62)	239.3 (9.42)	73.6 (2.90)	15.1 (0.59)	9.4 (0.37)	4.1 (0.16)	2.9 (0.11)	3.4 (0.13)	13.8 (0.54)	59.2 (2.33)	182.2 (7.17)	1,176.3 (46.31)
Average precipitation days (≥ 0.2 mm)	17.0	17.0	15.3	6.6	2.4	1.7	0.9	0.6	0.5	1.4	4.2	10.3	77.9
Average afternoon relative humidity (%)	66	72	68	57	56	52	48	43	42	43	47	57	54
Average dew point °C (°F)	23.7 (74.7)	24.2 (75.6)	23.3 (73.9)	20.9 (69.6)	19.5 (67.1)	17.5 (63.5)	15.9 (60.6)	15.4 (59.7)	17.1 (62.8)	18.4 (65.1)	20.7 (69.3)	22.3 (72.1)	19.9 (67.8)
Source: Bureau of Meteorology (1887-2025)
