= McIlwraith Range =

Mountain range in Queensland, Australia

McIlwraith
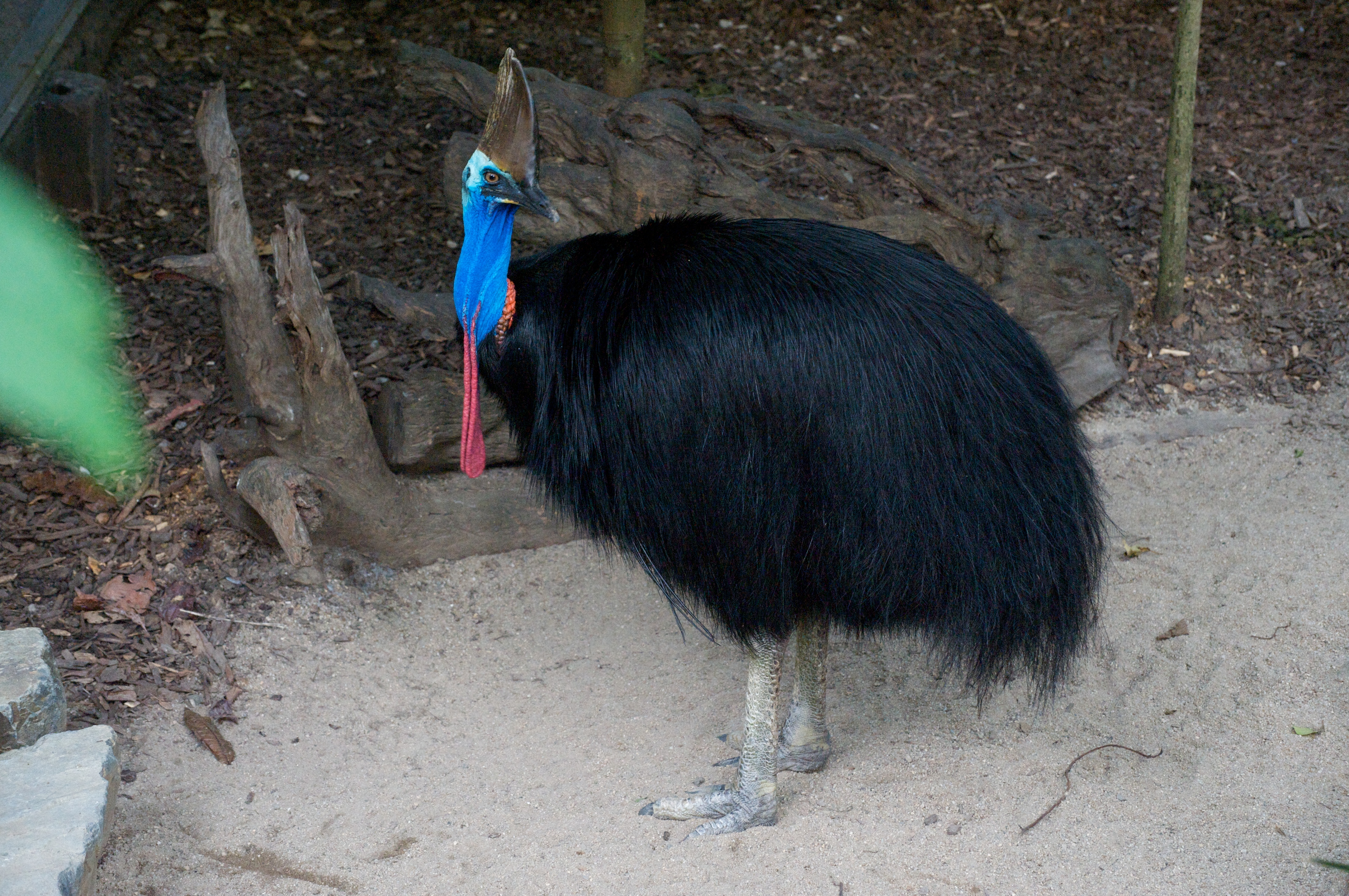
- The range is an important area for southern cassowaries

Highest point
- Peak: unnamed peak, northeast of Coen
- Elevation: 824 m (2,703 ft); AHD
- Coordinates: 13°54′26″S 143°18′40″E

Dimensions
- Area: 3,000 km^{2} (1,200 mi^{2})

Geography
- Location within Queensland
- Country: Australia
- State: Queensland
- Range coordinates: 13°45′S 143°20′E
- Parent range: Great Dividing Range

Geology
- Formed by: Volcanic plug
- Rock age(s): Cretaceous and Permian
- Rock type: Granite plateau

The McIlwraith Range is a rugged, dissected granite plateau on Cape York Peninsula of Far North Queensland, Australia. Part of the Great Dividing Range, the McIlwraith Range covers about 3,000 square kilometres (1,200 sq mi) and lies about 15 kilometres (9.3 mi) east of the town of Coen, and 550 kilometres (340 mi) north of Cairns. The Archer and Stewart Rivers rise in the range, with the Archer draining the range's western slopes into the Gulf of Carpentaria and the Stewart draining east into the Coral Sea. The range receives an annual rainfall of about 1,500 millimetres (59 in).

== History ==
Kaanju (also known as Kandju) is a language of Cape York. The Kaanju language region includes the landscape within the local government boundaries of the Cook Shire Council.

== Environment ==
The McIlwraith Range has been protected since its gazettal as the Kulla (McIlwraith Range) National Park. It is also listed on Australia's Register of the National Estate. It was named after Sir Thomas McIlwraith (1835–1900), three time Premier of Queensland 1879–1883, 1888, and 1893.

Most of the range is about 450 metres (1,480 ft) AHD, with a high point of 824 metres (2,703 ft) just north-east of Coen. The major peaks are Mount Carter, Mount White, Mount Newberry, and Mount Walsh. The range is largely vegetated with a variety of rainforest types, forming the southernmost limit of the ranges of many plants and animals characteristic of New Guinea. These include the spotted cuscus, green tree python and palm cockatoo. An endemic species is the McIlwraith leaf-tailed gecko (Orraya occultus).

=== Birds ===
The range is part of the 6,205 square kilometres (2,396 sq mi) McIlwraith and Iron Ranges Important Bird Area (IBA), identified as such by BirdLife International because it is one of the few known sites for the endangered buff-breasted buttonquail. The IBA also supports an isolated population of southern cassowaries as well as populations of lovely fairywrens, silver-crowned friarbirds, yellow, yellow-spotted, white-streaked and banded honeyeaters, and white-browed robins.
