= Cyclone Narelle (2026) =

Category 5 Australian region cyclone in 2026

Severe Tropical Cyclone Narelle
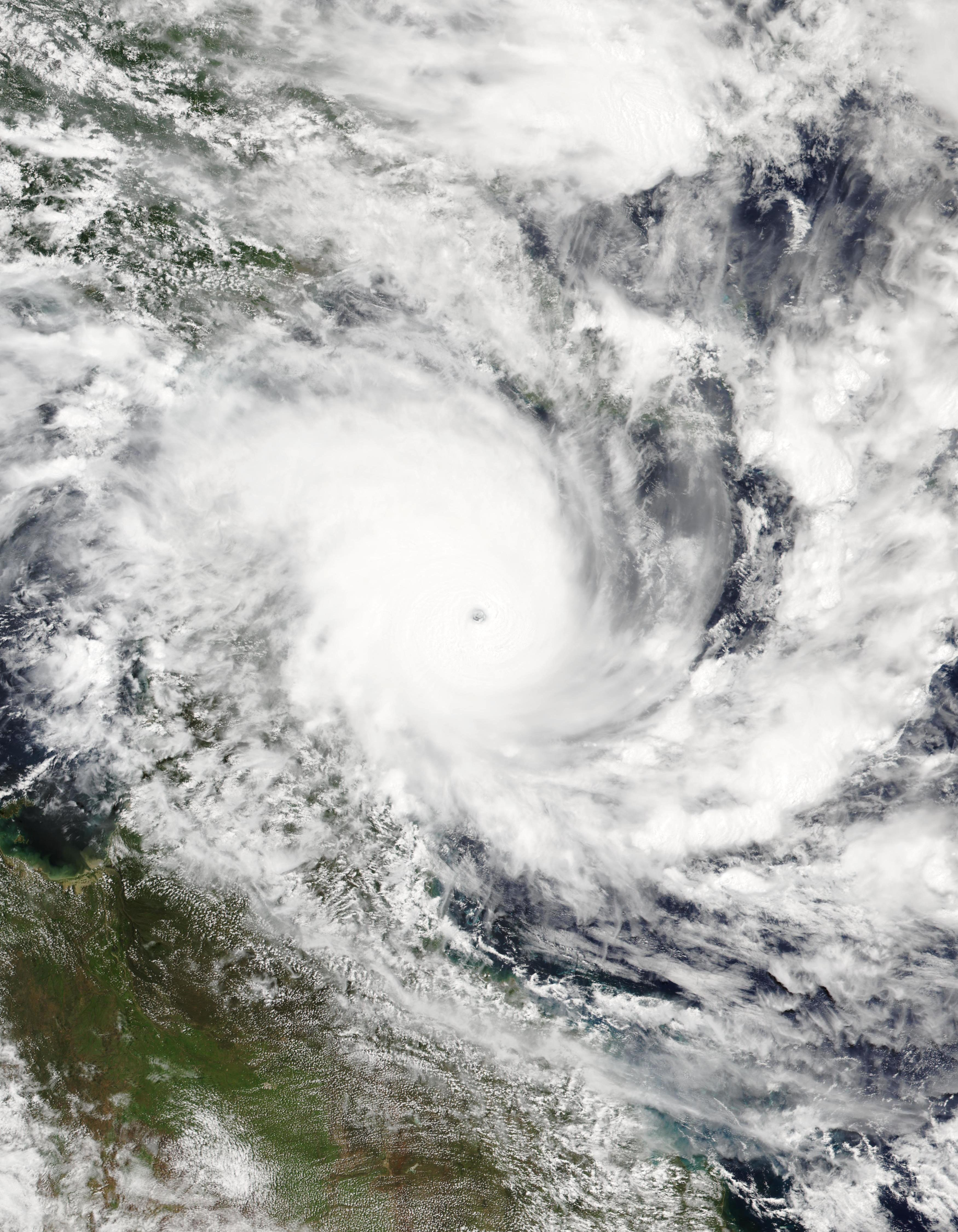
- Narelle at its primary peak intensity approaching Queensland on 19 March

Meteorological history
- Formed: 15 March 2026
- Remnant low: 27 March 2026
- Dissipated: 31 March 2026

Category 5 severe tropical cyclone
- 10-minute sustained (BOM)
- Highest winds: 215 km/h (130 mph)
- Highest gusts: 295 km/h (185 mph)
- Lowest pressure: 931 hPa (mbar); 27.49 inHg

Category 4-equivalent tropical cyclone
- 1-minute sustained (SSHWS/JTWC)
- Highest winds: 240 km/h (150 mph)
- Lowest pressure: 928 hPa (mbar); 27.40 inHg

Overall effects
- Fatalities: None
- Damage: $120 million (2026 USD)
- Areas affected: Queensland (particularly Cape York Peninsula), Northern Territory (particularly East Arnhem), Western Australia (particularly Kimberley and Gascoyne)
- Part of the 2025–26 Australian region cyclone season

Severe Tropical Cyclone Narelle was a powerful, unusual and long-lived tropical cyclone that made multiple landfalls in Australia, specifically in the Kimberley region, Far North Queensland, and the Top End, in March 2026. The twenty-first tropical low, tenth tropical cyclone, and sixth severe tropical cyclone of the 2025–26 Australian region cyclone season, Narelle formed from a tropical disturbance south of the Solomon Islands on 15 March. During its formative stages, the cyclone was designated as Tropical Low 34U by the Bureau of Meteorology, and initially moved to the east, before heading southwards and away from the country. Around this time, the Joint Typhoon Warning Center (JTWC) also upgraded the system to a tropical cyclone, designating it as 27P. Shortly thereafter, the system intensified to a Category 1 tropical cyclone on the Australian scale, and was assigned the name Narelle by the BoM. Narelle saw rapid development over the following days, intensifying into a Category 5 severe tropical cyclone (Category 4 on the Saffir-Simpson scale) the following day. Then, the storm made landfall on the Cape York Peninsula on 20 March as a Category 4 storm on the Australian scale, just to the south-southeast of Cape Sidmouth. Narelle eventually weakened to a Category 2 cyclone on the Australian scale before emerging over the Gulf of Carpentaria.

By 21 March, the cyclone resumed strengthening and attained a secondary peak as a Category 3 cyclone on the Australian scale, or a high-end Category 1 on the Saffir-Simpson scale. Later that evening, the storm made landfall in East Arnhem with winds of with the same winds and a pressure of around 973 hPa (mbar). Following its second landfall, Narelle weakened to a tropical low as it trekked across the northern periphery of Northern Territory during 22 March. The following day, it emerged over the Joseph Bonaparte Gulf for a short time before making a third landfall in Kimberley as a Category 1 cyclone on the Australian Scale (tropical storm on the Saffir–Simpson scale) with winds of 75 km/h (47 mph). Narelle would continue to traverse the northeastern corner of Western Australia as a tropical low over the next day, maintaining minimal tropical storm status on the Saffir-Simpson scale.

Early on 24 March, it would emerge over the far eastern Indian Ocean. Now a much larger and broader system, Narelle began its final intensification episode. On 26 March, the cyclone would achieve a fourth peak as a Category 4 tropical cyclone on the Australian scale (high-end Category 3 on the Saffir-Simpson scale), with a large eye being evident. While at this intensity, the storm would narrowly avoid making landfall along the North West Cape, passing just north of Exmouth. Narelle began weakening later that day, and by the next morning, it made its fourth and final landfall in Western Australia, just south of Coral Bay as a Category 3 cyclone on the Australian scale. Narelle weakened into a remnant low overnight, eventually becoming a broad extratropical cyclone south of Australia the following day.

== Meteorological history ==
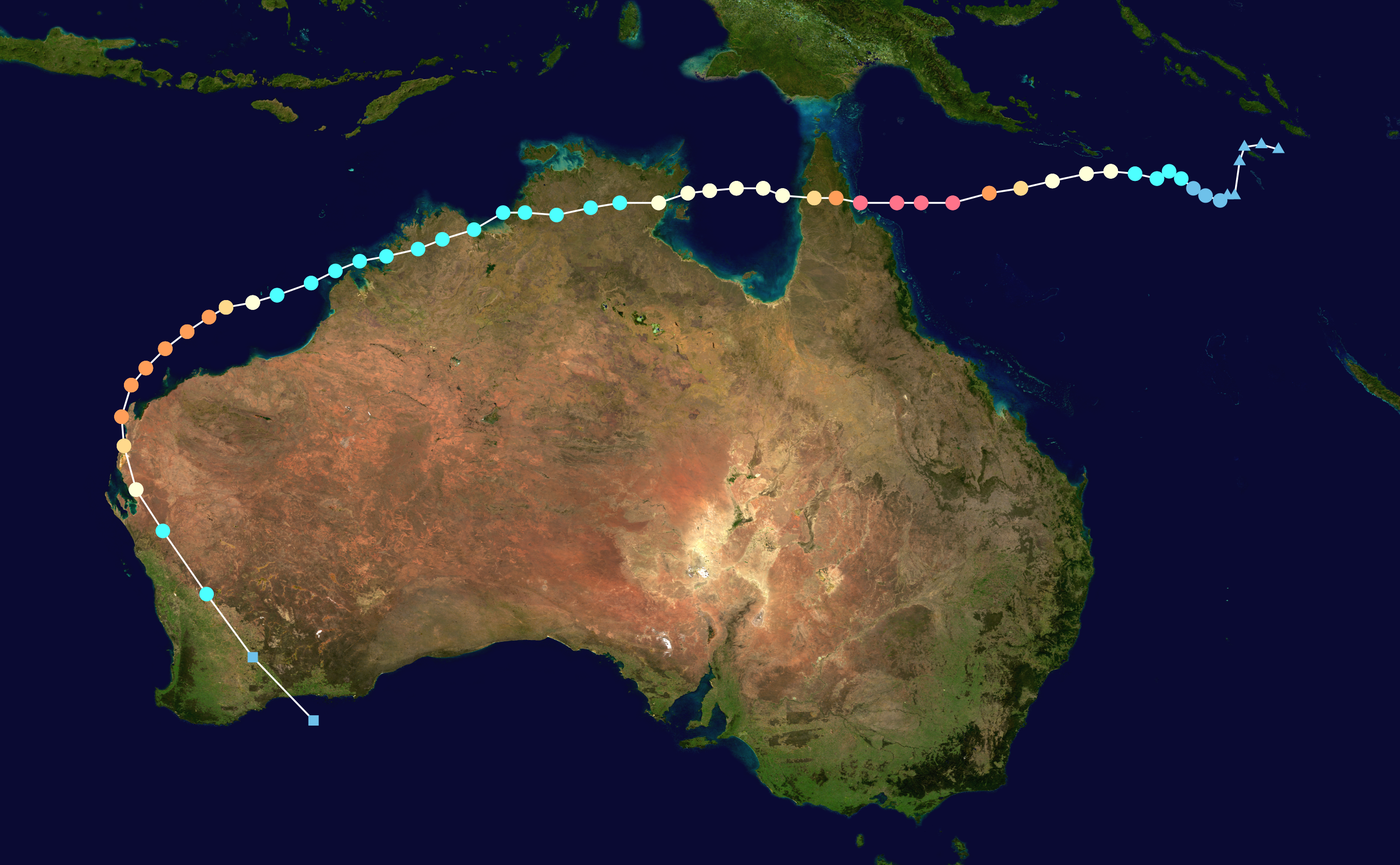
Map plotting the storm's track and intensity, according to the Saffir–Simpson scale Map key Saffir–Simpson scale Tropical depression (≤38 mph, ≤62 km/h) Tropical storm (39–73 mph, 63–118 km/h) Category 1 (74–95 mph, 119–153 km/h) Category 2 (96–110 mph, 154–177 km/h) Category 3 (111–129 mph, 178–208 km/h) Category 4 (130–156 mph, 209–251 km/h) Category 5 (≥157 mph, ≥252 km/h) Unknown Storm type Tropical cyclone Subtropical cyclone Extratropical cyclone, remnant low, tropical disturbance, or monsoon depression

Late on 9 March, the Bureau of Meteorology (BOM) began to forecast a tropical low forming in the eastern Coral Sea in the next 7 days, and pre-designated it as 34U. This came to fruition six days later on 15 March, where the BOM reported that it had developed to the south of the Solomon Islands. That same day, the low pressure system was officially designated a tropical low. Later on the system temporarily tracked to the west at a slow pace, and then preceded to quickly dip to the south. Only a single day after the disturbance formed, it was observed by the Joint Typhoon Warning Center while still classified as a tropical low by the BOM. On 17 March, the BOM classified the tropical low as a Category 1 tropical cyclone near Papua New Guinea, assigning it the name Narelle. The tropical cyclone preceded to intensify at a moderate pace, later attaining winds of hurricane force on 18 March. Narelle started to accelerate towards the Australian state of Queensland at an unusually fast pace of 24 km/h (15 mph). Later on 18 March, Narelle was officially tagged a severe tropical cyclone by the BoM, officially becoming the sixth in the season.

The next day on 19 March, Narelle reached Category 5 intensity, surpassing Fina as the strongest storm of the season. At its peak intensity, the BOM estimated that Narelle held 10-minute sustained winds of 220 km/h (140 mph), with gusts of 315 km/h (195 mph) and pressure levels of 925 hPa (mbar). The Joint Typhoon Warning Center estimated 1-minute sustained winds of 240 km/h (150 mph) and pressure levels of 926 hPa (mbar). At 07:00 local time on 20 March 2026, Severe Tropical Cyclone Narelle made landfall 200 kilometres (120 mi) east-southeast of Weipa, Queensland as a high-end Category 4 severe tropical cyclone. Over the day, Narelle would rapidly weaken due to the landfall, and after it had crossed Queensland at 18:00 local time, Narelle had weakened back into a Category 2 tropical cyclone. Now in the Gulf of Carpentaria, the cyclone began to re-intensify in the gulf, reaching a secondary peak intensity the following afternoon with 1-minute sustained winds of 150 km/h (95 mph), as estimated by the JTWC.

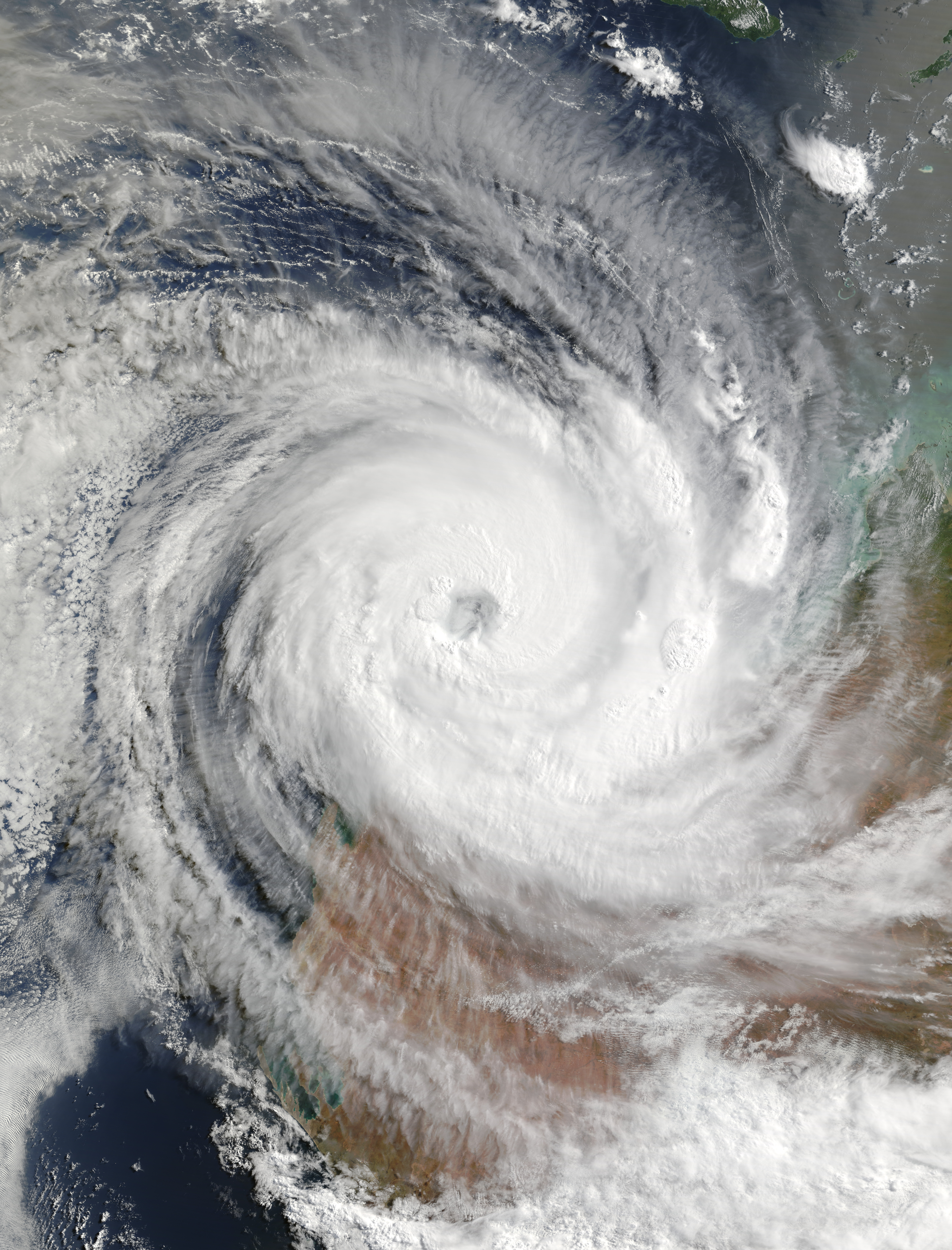
Narelle approaching Western Australia on 26 March near its fourth peak intensity, displaying its large structure

At 03:30 local time on 22 March 2026, Narelle made a secondary landfall near Point Arrowsmith, East Arnhem. Narelle weakened significantly after its second landfall, crossing the Northern Territory moving westward. The following evening, Narelle weakened into a tropical low but still persisted with its movement towards Kimberley. The next morning, Narelle entered the Joseph Bonaparte Gulf, persisting as a tropical low, and at 16:00 that same day, Narelle made a tertiary landfall in Kimberley with 1-minute sustained winds of 70 km/h (45 mph). On 24 March at 12:00 local time, Narelle emerged over the Indian Ocean. By this stage, Narelle was a weak, broad system presented with favourable conditions ahead. Throughout the next few days, Narelle would re-intensify in the area, becoming a severe tropical cyclone again on 25 March. It peaked as a Category 4 near Exmouth before it eventually made its fourth landfall near Exmouth on 27 March, weakening into a remnant low the same day and transitioned into a post-tropical cyclone as it traversed across the Western Australia Wheatbelt region. The next day, the Bureau of Meteorology stopped tracking the cyclone, and it dissipated shortly later.

== Preparations ==
Himawari 9 visual satellite loop of Narelle approaching Queensland throughout the afternoon to evening of 19 March

In response to the approach of Narelle, from Bureau of Meteorology, the Queensland State Emergency Service, in coordination with the Australian Defence Force, initiated a massive logistical operation to pre-position food, medical supplies, and satellite communication across the Cape York Peninsula; additionally, tourists were evacuated and schools were closed ahead of the cyclone. A pre-emptive evacuation of 500 residents from Numbulwar to Darwin remained in place for several days due to local inundation and the risk of waterborne disease.

Shelter-in-place orders were made for Queensland. Emergency warnings were issued for Coen, Lockhart River, and Port Stewart. A tropical cyclone warning was issued in between Lockhart River and Cape Tribulation. Hundreds were evacuated from Port Stewart and Numbulwar. Bauxite mines owned by Rio Tinto in Queensland and manganese mines owned by South32 and Anglo American in the Northern Territory were closed temporarily. In Katherine, a field hospital was set up in preparation for Narelle.

== Impact ==
=== Queensland ===
Ergon Energy estimated that 3,000 properties lost power due to strong winds from Narelle. Telstra reported that four cell sites had been knocked offline by Narelle. Around 200 mm (7.9 in) of rain fell over the Cape York Peninsula and northern Northern Territory, while wind gusts up to 115 kilometres per hour (71 mph) were recorded in Lockhart River. In Aurukun, a barbecue shelter was damaged by a fallen tree. Telephone signals were lost in western coastal communities like Aurukun. Trees were downed and roofs were pulled off buildings in Queensland as a result of the storm. Cairns reported significant coastal erosion from Narelle. Coen's water supplies were shut down.

=== Northern Territory ===
The Daly River was left at major flood stage for weeks.

=== Western Australia ===
In Western Australia, red skies were reported due to dust being blown by Narelle dispersing blue light. As the system made its fourth landfall, it caused extensive damage and flooding in the town of Exmouth, including extensive damage to the town's airport (including the apparent total destruction of the supporting weather radar facility), and several structures in the town. The damage inflicted to the airport in particular would result in major delays throughout the recovery effort, as the lack of operational airfields would necessitate a near total reliance on road based logistical infrastructure for transporting both humanitarian supplies and building materials. In the Exmouth region, infrastructure to Chevron Corporation and Woodside Energy facilities was damaged, pausing gasoline production.

Over 350 mm (14 in) fell in Ningaloo Reef.. The storm killed over 1,000 sea turtles, 200 seabirds, 30 cetaceans and some sea snakes on beaches in Western Australia. A mobile hospital was deployed to aid animals near Exmouth. Banana farms in Carnarvon had to cease production for the rest the year following Narelle's impact, the effects of which compounded the already significant damages inflicted by Cyclone Mitchell and a preceding heat wave.

Moisture from the decaying system later interacted with a coastal trough system as it moved down Western Australia causing flooding in Mandurah after the city received 102.8 mm (4.05 in) in 24 hours. Perth also got the most March rainfall the city has seen in 91 years (since 1934) while the city's 24-hour March record, set during the 2010 Western Australian storms, was also broken with 62.8 mm (2.47 in) falling.

Aon estimated that losses from Narelle totaled to US$120 million.

== Aftermath and retirement ==
The Australian Defence Force was deployed to Katherine. Following the cyclone, 50 lineworkers were mobilized to restore power and sixteen rural communities were surveyed for damage. Narelle damaged Ningaloo Reef's first spawn since a significant heat wave the previous year.

After Narelle, Charles III wrote a letter urging more action against climate change, claiming that the Northern Territory was among the most impacted regions by the phenomena.

Due to the impacts the storm caused, the name Narelle was retired by the Bureau of Meteorology from the list of names in the Australian basin. It was replaced with the name Nikita for future seasons.

== See also ==
- Weather of 2026
- Tropical cyclones in 2026
- List of storms with the same name
- List of Queensland tropical cyclones
- Geology of Australia — responsible for the red skies in Western Australia
