= Lama Lama National Park =

National park in Queensland, Australia

- IUCN category II (national park)
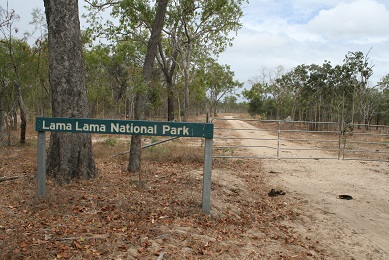

- Location within Queensland
- Location: Queensland
- Nearest city: Coen
- Coordinates: 14°25′08″S 143°41′05″E
- Area: 355.6 km^{2} (137.3 sq mi)
- Established: 2008
- Governing body: Queensland Parks and Wildlife Service
- Website: Official website

Lama Lama National Park is a national park on Cape York Peninsula in Far North Queensland, Australia. The name comes from the Lama Lama people who are the traditional owners of the land. The park protects coastal plains, beach ridges and sandy hills of the Annie River water catchment. The river marks the southern border of the park.

Lama Lama National Park was the first national park in Queensland to be jointly managed between the traditional owners and the Government of Queensland. A signing ceremony marking the creation of the new national park was held at Coen on 10 July 2008. It contains an important plant species Eucalyptus tetrodonta also known as Darwin stringybark. It also protects the habitat of the critically endangered Red goshawk.

== Geography ==
Lama Lama National Park is located about 70 km south east of Coen in the locality of Yarraden in the Shire of Cook. The eastern edge of the park fronts Princess Charlotte Bay and Rinyirru National Park. The park contains two restricted areas. These are known as Allngna Wungku Living Area and Goose Swamp and Bull Swamp Area. Lama Lama National Park contains around 39 lacustrine/palustrine wetlands which occupy 5% of the park. The two properties which formed the park were known as Running Creek and Lilyvale.

== See also ==
- Lama Lama people
- Protected areas of Queensland
