= Merapah, Queensland =

Merapah Queensland
- Coordinates: 13.7166°S 142.4166°E
- Postcode(s): 4892
- LGA(s): Shire of Cook
- State electorate(s): Cook
- Federal division(s): Leichhardt

Merapah is a homestead in the Shire of Cook, Queensland, Australia. The homestead is within the locality of Yarraden.
