= Moojeeba, Queensland =

Moojeeba Queensland
- Coordinates: 14.0791°S 143.6486°E
- Time zone: AEST (UTC+10:00)
- Location: 62.0 km (39 mi) ESE of Coen; 447 km (278 mi) NW of Cooktown; 585 km (364 mi) NWN of Cairns; 2,264 km (1,407 mi) NNW of Brisbane
- LGA(s): Shire of Cook
- State electorate(s): Cook
- Federal division(s): Leichhardt

Moojeeba is a town in the Shire of Cook, Queensland, Australia. The town is within the locality of Coen.

== History ==
The Town of Moojeeba is present on a 1900 survey plan.

As at January 2021, Moojeeba has no buildings.
