= Coen Airport =

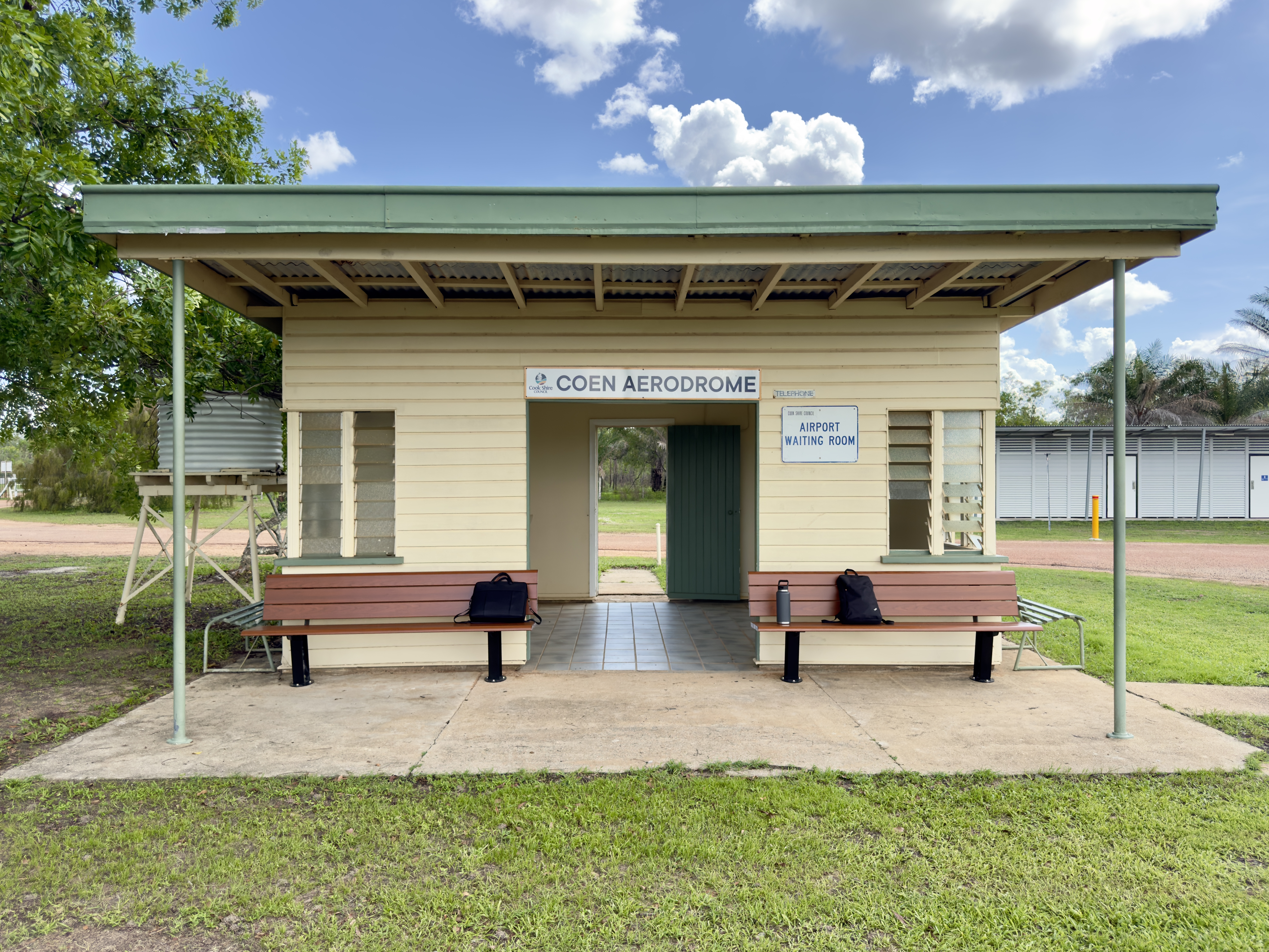
- Coen Airport Terminal
- IATA: CUQ; ICAO: YCOE

Summary
- Airport type: Public
- Operator: Aerodrome Management Services
- Serves: Coen, Queensland
- Elevation AMSL: 533 ft / 162 m
- Coordinates: 13°45′43″S 143°07′00″E

Map
- Location in Queensland

Runways
Direction	Length		Surface
Direction	m	ft	Surface
11/29	1,209	3,967	Asphalt
- Sources: Australian AIP and aerodrome chart

Coen Airport (IATA: CUQ, ICAO: YCOE) is an airport located 12 nautical miles (22 km; 14 mi) northwest of Coen, Queensland, Australia.

== See also ==
- List of airports in Queensland
