= Archer River, Queensland =

Archer River
- Suburb
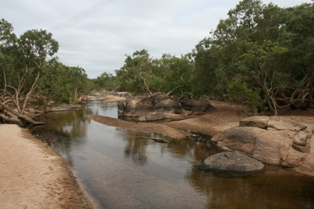
- Archer River, 2011

- Interactive map of Archer River
- Coordinates: 13.3527°S 142.6066°E\
- Country: Australia
- State: Queensland
- LGA: Shire of Cook
- Location: 68.7 km (42.7 mi) NNW of Coen; 194 km (121 mi) SE of Weipa; 449 km (279 mi) NW of Cooktown; 774 km (481 mi) NNW of Cairns; 2,446 km (1,520 mi) NNW of Brisbane

Government
  - State electorate: Cook
  - Federal division: Leichhardt

Area
  - Total: 9,381.3 km^{2} (3,622.1 sq mi)

Population
  - Total: 27 (2021 census)
  - Density: 0.00288/km^{2} (0.00745/sq mi)
- Time zone: UTC+10:00 (AEST)
- Postcode: 4871
Suburbs around Archer River
Mission River	Mission River	Wenlock
Aurukun	Archer River	Lockhart River
Aurukun	Holroyd River	Coen

Archer River is a rural locality in the Shire of Cook, Queensland, Australia. In the 2021 census, Archer River had a population of 27 people.

== Geography ==
This inland locality takes its name from the Archer River which flows from east to west across the locality towards the Gulf of Carpentaria.

Bald Hill is in the east of the locality (13.3012°S 143.0660°E), rising to 439 metres (1,440 ft) above sea level.

The Peninsula Developmental Road passes through the locality in a NW-SE direction connecting Weipa on the Gulf of Carpentaria to Lakeland. There are two major road junctions within Archer River from the Peninsula Developmental Road. At 13.0804°S 142.7682°E there is a turn-off towards the north onto the Telegraph Road towards Bamaga at the northern tip of Cape York Peninsula. At 13.1733°S 142.8435°E there is a turn-off towards the north-east on Portland Road to the Lockhart River community on the Coral Sea coast.

The Oyala Thumotang National Park (formerly known as Mungkan Kandju National Park and Archer Bend National Park) is in the south-west of the locality. Apart from this protected area, the land use is predominantly grazing on native vegetation.

== History ==
Kaanju (also known as Kaanju and Kandju) is a language of Cape York. The Kaanju language region includes the landscape within the local government boundaries of the Cook Shire Council.

Linngithigh (also known as Winda Winda and Linginiti) was an Australian Aboriginal language spoken by the Linngithigh people. The Linngithigh language region includes landscape within the local government boundaries of the Cook Shire Council: Western Cape York, Winda Winda Creek, Mission River, and Archer River.

== Demographics ==
In the 2016 census Archer River had a population of 22 people.

In the 2021 census, Archer River had a population of 27 people.

== Heritage listings ==
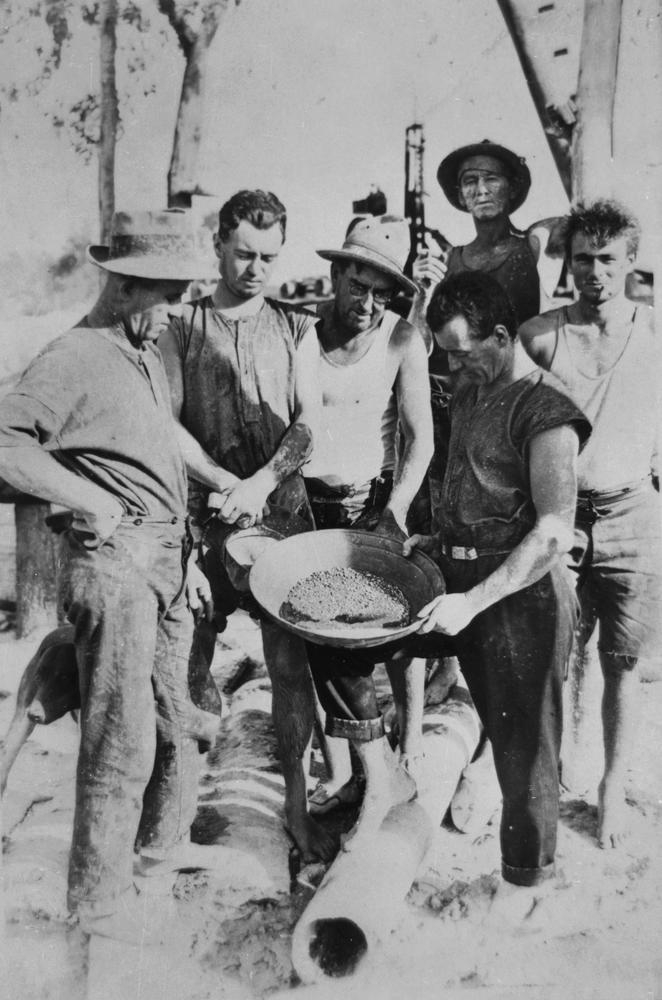
Panning for gold in Wenlock, circa 1930

The Wenlock Goldfield is a heritage-listed site (13.0894°S 142.9435°E).

== Education ==
There are no schools in Archer River. The nearest government primary school is the Coen campus of the Cape York Aboriginal Australian Academy (with the main campus in Hope Vale). However, most students in Archer River are too distant to attend this school. Also, there are no nearby secondary schools. The alternatives are distance education and boarding school.

== Amenities ==
The Archer River Roadhouse (13.4379°S 142.9416°E) is located on the Peninsula Developmental Road immediately south of the Archer River. It provides accommodation, laundry, meals, fuel, minor motor vehicle repairs, and internet access.
