= Shelburne, Queensland =

Shelburne
- Suburb
- Interactive map of Shelburne
- Coordinates: 12.0386°S 142.9763°E
- Country: Australia
- State: Queensland
- LGA: Shire of Cook
- Location: 326 km (203 mi) NE of Weipa; 685 km (426 mi) NNW of Cooktown; 854 km (531 mi) NNW of Cairns; 2,541 km (1,579 mi) NNW of Brisbane

Government
  - State electorate: Cook
  - Federal division: Leichhardt

Area
  - Total: 10,006.8 km^{2} (3,863.6 sq mi)
- Elevation: 1.0 m (3.3 ft)

Population
  - Total: 44 (2021 census)
  - Density: 0.00440/km^{2} (0.01139/sq mi)
- Time zone: UTC+10:00 (AEST)
- Postcode: 4874
Suburbs around Shelburne
Mapoon	Jardine River	Coral Sea
Mapoon	Shelburne	Coral Sea
Wenlock	Wenlock	Iron Range

Shelburne is a northern coastal locality in the Shire of Cook, Queensland, Australia. In the 2021 census, Shelburne had a population of 44 people.

== Geography ==
The Great Dividing Range enters the locality from the north (Jardine River) and exits to the south-west (Wenlock), but then forms the south-western boundary of the locality.

The Pascoe River forms the south-eastern boundary of the locality, flowing into th Coral Sea.The eastern boundary of the locality is within the Coral Sea as the boundary of the locality encompasses a number of off-shore islands.

Parts of Shelburn are protected areas. In the north of the locality is the Heathlands Resources Reserve. In the east of the locality is the Wuthathi (Shelburne Bay) National Park and the Bromley (Ampulin) National Park. In the south of the locality is the Bromley (Kungkaychi) National Park. Apart from these protected areas, the predominant land use is grazing on native vegetation.

== History ==
In 1976, the Australian Conservation Foundation first proposed the establishment of a national park to protect Shelburne Bays' white silica sand dunes. In 1987, a silica sand mining project in the area was rejected by Prime Minister Bob Hawke because of environmental concerns and the adverse impact on the Aboriginal community who had sacred sites in the area. On 15 December 2016 the Queensland Treasurer Curtis Pitt announced that more than 118,000 hectares (290,000 acres) of land would be returned to the Wuthathi people with 40,000 hectares (99,000 acres) set aside to create the Wuthathi (Shelburne Bay) National Park which would be jointly managed by the Queensland Government and the Wuthathi people.

On 17 May 2017, the Queensland Government announced that 160,730 hectares (397,200 acres) of land set aside in 1986 for the development of a spaceport would be returned to the Wuthathi, Kuuku Ya’u and Northern Kaanju people. 40,350 hectares (99,700 acres) of the land would be used to establish Bromley (Ampulin) National and 10,680 hectares (26,400 acres) used to establish Bromley (Kungkaychi) National Parks, both of which would be jointly managed by the Bromley Aboriginal Corporation and the Queensland Government.

== Demographics ==
In the 2016 census, Shelburne had a population of 31 people.

In the 2021 census, Shelburne had a population of 44 people.

== Education ==
There are no schools in Shelburne nor nearby. The alternatives are distance education and boarding school.

== Attractions ==
There are a number of lookouts in Shelburne, including:

- Captain Billy Lookout at Captain Billy Landing on the northern coast of the locality (11.6270°S 142.8550°E)
- Jardines Lookout on the north-western boundary of the locality on the Great Dividing Range (11.6337°S 142.7405°E)
