= Ebagoola, Queensland =

Ebagoola Queensland
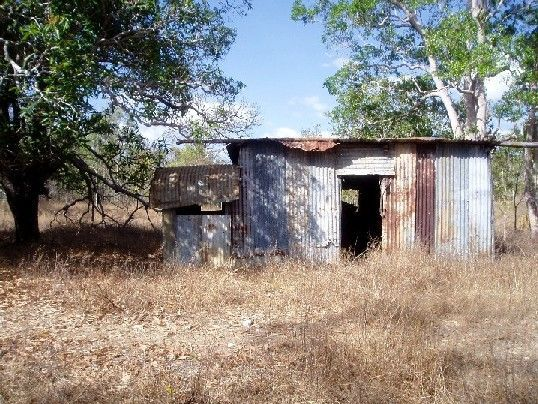
- Last building standing in Ebagoola

- Coordinates: 14.3036°S 143.265°E
- Postcode(s): 4892
- Time zone: AEST (UTC+10:00)
- Location: 54.4 km (34 mi) S of Coen; 72.2 km (45 mi) NNW of Yarraden (town); 348 km (216 mi) NW of Cooktown; 513 km (319 mi) NNW of Cairns; 2,187 km (1,359 mi) NNW of Brisbane
- LGA(s): Shire of Cook
- State electorate(s): Cook
- Federal division(s): Leichhardt

Ebagoola is a town in the Shire of Cook, Queensland, Australia. The town is within the locality of Yarraden.

== Ebagoola Township and Battery ==
The town was surveyed in 1900 by James Dickie.

Ebagoola is the site of the Ebagoola Township and Battery, a former mining camp built from 1900 until 1913, which was added to the Queensland Heritage Register on 15 May 2006.

Ebagoolah Provisional School opened in 1905. On 1 January 1909, it became Ebagoolah State School. It closed in 1914.

Today, only a single building from the era still stands.
