= Edward River, Queensland =

Edward River
- Suburb
- Interactive map of Edward River
- Coordinates: 14.9083°S 142.5080°E
- Country: Australia
- State: Queensland
- LGA: Shire of Cook
- Location: 150 km (93 mi) NW of Kowanyama; 406 km (252 mi) WNW of Cooktown; 570 km (350 mi) NW of Cairns; 2,248 km (1,397 mi) NNW of Brisbane

Government
  - State electorate: Cook
  - Federal division: Leichhardt

Area
  - Total: 5,935.3 km^{2} (2,291.6 sq mi)

Population
  - Total: 0 (2021 census)
  - Density: 0.00000/km^{2} (0.00000/sq mi)
- Time zone: UTC+10:00 (AEST)
- Postcode: 4892
Suburbs around Edward River
Aurukun	Holroyd River	Yarraden
Pormpuraaw	Edward River	Dixie
Kowanyama	Maramie	Dixie

Edward River is an outback locality in the Shire of Cook, Queensland, Australia. In the 2021 census, Edward River had "no people or a very low population".

== Geography ==
This inland locality on the Cape York Peninsula is named for the Edward River that runs through it towards the Gulf of Carpentaria. Musgrave-Strathgordon Road passes through the locality from Yarraden to the east towards Pormpuraaw to the west on the Gulf.

The land use is grazing on native vegetation.

== History ==
Kuuk Thaayorre (also known as Koko-Daiyuri, Kuku Yak, Thayorre, and used as a generic name for several related languages/dialects) is an Australian Aboriginal Language spoken on Western Cape York, particularly in the area around Pormpuraaw (Edward River). The Thaayorre language region includes the local government areas of the Aboriginal Shire of Pormpuraaw and the Shire of Cook.

Kugu Mu'inh ( also known as Wik Muinh, Kuku Muinh, Wik Muin, Kuku-Mu'inh. See also related Wik languages) is a traditional language of the area which includes landscape within the local government boundaries of the Cook Shire.

== Demographics ==
In the 2016 census, Edward River had "no people or a very low population".

In the 2021 census, Edward River had "no people or a very low population".

== Education ==
There are no schools in Edward River. Students living in the south-west of the locality can attend Kowanyama State School (Early Childhood to Year 10) in neighbouring Kowanyama to the south-west. Other parts of the locality would be too distant to attend. Also there are no nearby schools providing education to Year 12. The alternatives are distance education and boarding school.
