= Wenlock, Queensland =

Wenlock
- Suburb
- Interactive map of Wenlock
- Coordinates: 12.5233°S 142.6513°E
- Country: Australia
- State: Queensland
- LGA: Shire of Cook
- Location: 218 km (135 mi) ENE of Weipa; 577 km (359 mi) NNW of Cooktown; 741 km (460 mi) NNW of Cairns; 2,416 km (1,501 mi) NNW of Brisbane

Government
  - State electorate: Cook
  - Federal division: Leichhardt

Area
  - Total: 3,805.6 km^{2} (1,469.4 sq mi)

Population
  - Total: 9 (2021 census)
  - Density: 0.00236/km^{2} (0.0061/sq mi)
- Time zone: UTC+10:00 (AEST)
- Postcode: 4874
Suburbs around Wenlock
Mapoon	Shelburne	Shelburne
Mission River	Wenlock	Shelburne
Mapoon	Archer River	Archer River

Wenlock is a rural locality in the Shire of Cook, Queensland, Australia. In the 2021 census, Wenlock had a population of 9 people.

== Geography ==
The locality is in the northern part of the Cape York Peninsula. The Great Dividing Range passes through the north-eastern corner of the locality and then forms the eastern and south-eastern boundary of the locality. Consequently most of the locality lies to the west of the Great Dividing Range and is within the Gulf of Carpentaria drainage basin with a small section of the north-east of the locality being east of the range within the North-East Coast drainage basin (flowing into the Coral Sea.

There are 3 small sections of the Batavia National Park in the north-east, east, and south-west of the locality. There is an area in the north of the locality used for grazing on native vegetation, but there is minimal land use in most of the locality.

== Demographics ==
In the 2016 census, Wenlock had "no people or a very low population".

In the 2021 census, Wenlock had a population of 9 people.

== Education ==
There are no schools in Wenlock. The nearest government primary and secondary school is Western Cape College (Early Childhood to Year 12) in Rocky Point, Weipa, to the west. There is also a Catholic primary school in Rocky Point. However, these schools would be too distant for most students in Wenlock. The alternatives are distance education and boarding school.
