= Holroyd River, Queensland =

Holroyd River
- Suburb
- Interactive map of Holroyd River
- Coordinates: 14.2066°S 142.4761°E
- Country: Australia
- State: Queensland
- LGA: Shire of Cook
- Location: 121 km (75 mi) NW of Yarraden; 135 km (84 mi) SW of Coen; 397 km (247 mi) NW of Cooktown; 563 km (350 mi) NW of Cairns; 2,246 km (1,396 mi) NNW of Brisbane

Government
  - State electorate: Cook
  - Federal division: Leichhardt

Area
  - Total: 8,288.5 km^{2} (3,200.2 sq mi)

Population
  - Total: 0 (2021 census)
  - Density: 0.00000/km^{2} (0.00000/sq mi)
- Postcode: 4871
Suburbs around Holroyd River
Archer River	Archer River	Coen
Aurukun	Holroyd River	Yarraden
Pormpuraaw	Edward River	Yarraden

Holroyd River is an outback locality in the Shire of Cook, Queensland, Australia. In the 2021 census, Holroyd River had "no people or a very low population".

== Geography ==
The Archer River forms a small part of the northern boundary.

The land use in the west of the locality is grazing on native vegetation. The land in the east of the locality has minimal use.

== Demographics ==
In the 2016 census, Holroyd River had "no people or a very low population".

In the 2021 census, Holroyd River had "no people or a very low population".

== Education ==
There are no schools in Holroyd River. The nearest government primary school is the Coen campus of the Cape York Aboriginal Australian Academy in Coen to the north-east; however, it would be too distant for many parts of Holroyd River to attend. Also, there are no government secondary schools nearby. The alternatives are distance education and boarding school.
