= Stewart River (Queensland) =

River in Queensland, Australia

Stewart
- Location of Stewart River mouth in Queensland
- Etymology: Stewart, a member of the 1872 exploration party led by William Hann.

Location
- Country: Australia
- State: Queensland
- Region: Far North Queensland, Cape York Peninsula

Physical characteristics
- Source: McIlwraith Range, Great Dividing Range
  - location: northeast of Coen
  - coordinates: 13°53′44″S 143°17′39″E
  - elevation: 580 m (1,900 ft)
- Mouth: Coral Sea
  - location: Port Stewart
  - coordinates: 14°04′08″S 143°41′40″E
  - elevation: 0 m (0 ft)
- Length: 96 km (60 mi)
- Basin size: 837.1 km^{2} (323.2 sq mi)
- Discharge
  - location: Near mouth
  - average: 10.2 m^{3}/s (320 GL/a)

Basin features
- Tributaries
  - left: Station Creek (Queensland), Little Stewart Creek

The Stewart River is a river in the Cape York Peninsula of Far North Queensland, Australia.

The headwaters of the Stewart River rise in McIlwraith Range, part of the Great Dividing Range, northeast of Coen. The river flows generally south, then south by east and then finally east, joined by two minor tributaries before reaching its mouth and emptying into the Coral Sea at Port Stewart. The river descends 580 metres (1,900 ft) over its 92-kilometre (57 mi) course.

The river has a catchment area of 2,743 square kilometres (1,059 sq mi) of which an area of 81 square kilometres (31 sq mi) is composed of estuarine wetlands.

The river was named after a member of the 1872 exploration party led by William Hann with the family name of Stewart.

== See also ==
- List of rivers of Australia § Queensland
