= Dixie, Queensland =

Dixie
- Suburb
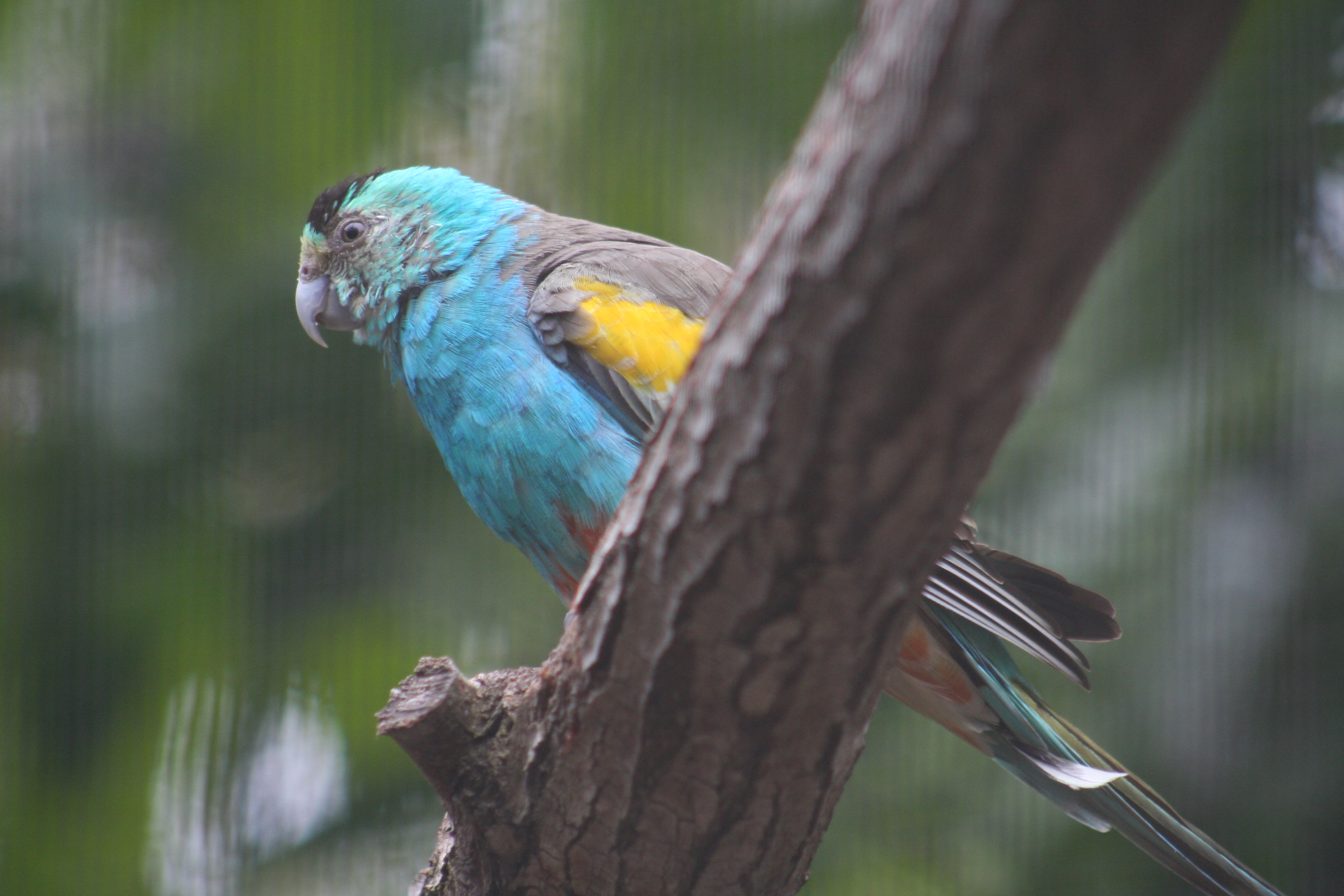
- Golden-shouldered parrot

- Interactive map of Dixie
- Coordinates: 15.3741°S 143.2436°E
- Country: Australia
- State: Queensland
- LGA: Shire of Cook
- Location: 59.3 km (36.8 mi) SW of Yarraden; 285 km (177 mi) WNW of Cooktown; 459 km (285 mi) NW of Cairns; 2,131 km (1,324 mi) NNW of Brisbane

Government
  - State electorate: Cook
  - Federal division: Leichhardt

Area
  - Total: 6,257.2 km^{2} (2,415.9 sq mi)

Population
  - Total: 43 (2021 census)
  - Density: 0.00687/km^{2} (0.01780/sq mi)
- Time zone: UTC+10:00 (AEST)
- Postcode: 4871
Suburbs around Dixie
Yarraden	Yarraden	Yarraden
Edward River	Dixie	Laura
Maramie	Palmer	Palmer

Dixie is a rural locality in the Shire of Cook, Queensland, Australia. In the 2021 census, Dixie had a population of 43 people.

== Geography ==
The locality contains the source of both the Morehead River and Alice River.

The Great Dividing Range enters the locality from the north (Yarraden) and exits to the south-west (Laura).

Most of the west of the locality and some of the east of the locality is within the Olkola National Park (Cape York Peninsula Aboriginal Land). Apart from these protected areas, the land use is grazing on native vegetation.

== History ==
The Dixie pastoral station is within the locality. It was purchased by the Queensland Government in August 2012. Part of the land will be made into a conservation area to protect the habitat of the endangered golden-shouldered parrot.

== Demographics ==
In the 2016 census, Dixie had a population of 16 people.

In the 2021 census, Dixie had a population of 43 people.

== Education ==
There are no schools in Dixie nor nearby. The options are distance education and boarding school.
