= Yarraden =

- Suburb
- Interactive map of Yarraden
- Coordinates: 14.5211°S 143.2444°E
- Country: Australia
- State: Queensland
- LGA: Shire of Cook
- Location: 108 km (67 mi) S of Coen; 278 km (173 mi) NW of Cooktown; 447 km (278 mi) NW of Cairns; 2,119 km (1,317 mi) NNW of Brisbane

Government
  - State electorate: Cook
  - Federal division: Leichhardt

Area
  - Total: 11,426.6 km^{2} (4,411.8 sq mi)

Population
  - Total: 53 (2021 census)
  - Density: 0.00464/km^{2} (0.01201/sq mi)
- Time zone: UTC+10:00 (AEST)
- Postcode: 4871
Suburbs around Yarraden
Holroyd River	Coen	Coral Sea
Edward River	Yarraden	Lakefield
Maramie	Dixie	Laura

Yarraden is a coastal rural locality in the Shire of Cook, Queensland, Australia. In the 2021 census, Yarraden had a population of 53 people.

== Geography ==
Yarraden is on the eastern side of Cape York Peninsula bordering the Coral Sea. The Great Dividing Range passes through the locality from the north (Coen) to the south (Dixie). The Peninsula Developmental Road passes through in from north (Coen) to the south-east (Laura).

The Great Dividing Range creates a watershed with the creeks and rivers rising to the east of the range flowing into the Coral Sea, while the creeks and rivers rising to the west of the range flow into the Gulf of Carpentaria.

Ebagoola is an abandoned gold mining town (14.3036°S 143.265°E).

=== Mountains ===
Curlew Range is a mountain range (14.7853°S 143.1650°E).

There are numerous mountains in the locality, from north to south:

- Mount Newberry (14.3477°S 143.4763°E ) 260 metres (850 ft) above sea level, named after industrial chemist James Cosmo Newbery by explorer William Hann
- Mount Walsh on the Great Dividing Range (14.4172°S 143.4508°E ) 272 metres (892 ft) above sea level, named after storekeeper John Walsh of Cooktown by prospector and explorer James Venture Mulligan
- Mount Ryan (14.4338°S 143.3305°E) 442 metres (1,450 ft) above sea level
- Spion Cop (14.5094°S 143.3038°E ) 315 metres (1,033 ft) above sea level
- Lapunya Mount (14.5619°S 143.3697°E ) 309 metres (1,014 ft) above sea level
- Flying Fox Hill (14.7258°S 143.2252°E ) 262 metres (860 ft) above sea level

The Gorge is a valley (14.6333°S 143.0333°E).

=== Offshore ===
Only a small section in the north-east of the locality is coastal, facing Princess Charlotte Bay (14.2168°S 143.9680°E), which was named by naval officer Lieutenant Charles Jeffreys (or Jefferys) serving on the HM Colonial brig Kangaroo on 30 May 1815.

Cliff Islands is an island group (14.2263°S 143.7930°E) approx 7 kilometres (4.3 mi) offshore.

A small area in the north-east of the locality (north of Annie River) is within the Lama Lama National Park.

Apart from the national park, the predominant land use is grazing on native vegetation.

== History ==
The town of Ebagoola was surveyed in 1900 by James Dickie.

The town of Yarraden (14°25′43″S 143°17′47″E) was established to support the Lukin River gold field discovered in 1901. In March 1903, its gold reefs were described as "amongst the largest and richest". The two major gold mines were Golden King and Savannah. Golden King was worked from 1901 to 1914 and in 1917 and 1921. Savannah was worked from 1901 to 1907 and in 1912.

Ebagoolah Provisional School opened in 1905. On 1 January 1909 it became Ebagoolah State School. It closed in 1914.

== Demographics ==
In the 2016 census, Yarraden had a population of 11 people.

In the 2021 census, Yarraden had a population of 53 people.

== Heritage listings ==
Yarraden has a number of heritage-listed sites, including:

- Ebagoola Township and Battery
- Musgrave Telegraph Station, Peninsula Developmental Road (14.7825°S 143.4847°E)

== Education ==
There are no schools in Yarraden. The nearest government primary school is the Coen campus of the Cape York Aboriginal Australian Academy to the north; however, this school would only be within daily commuting range of students living in the north of the locality. There are no secondary schools nearby. For students without access to local schools, the alternatives are distance education and boarding school.

== Economy ==
There are a number of homesteads in the locality:

- Artemis (14.9782°S 143.5771°E)
- Astrea (14.7337°S 143.0449°E)
- Crystal Vale (14.0766°S 142.9901°E)
- Ebagoola (14.3046°S 143.2676°E)
- Glen Garland (14.8488°S 143.2745°E)
- Lily Vale (14.4891°S 143.6772°E)
- Musgrave (14.7811°S 143.5036°E)
- New Bamboo (14.6406°S 143.4737°E)
- Running Creek (14.3092°S 143.7264°E)
- Strathhaven (14.8777°S 142.9634°E)
- Strathmay (14.8856°S 142.8016°E)
- Violet Vale (14.7319°S 143.5863°E)
- Yarraden (14.3091°S 143.3065°E)

== Transport ==
There are a number of airstrips in the locality:

- Astrea Station airstrip (14.7431°S 143.0547°E )
- Ancilia Station airstrip (14.8524°S 143.2763°E )
- Leconsfield Station airstrip (14.0805°S 142.9959°E )
- Lily Vale Station airstrip (14.4912°S 143.6785°E)
- Minka Station airstrip on Yarraden Station (14.8817°S 142.7988°E )
- Musgrave Station airstrip (14.7760°S 143.5047°E)
- Strathaven Station Airstrip (14.8743°S 142.9646°E)
- Violet Vale Station airstrip (14.7332°S 143.5879°E )
- Yarraden airstrip (14.3035°S 143.3108°E )
- Yarraden Station airstrip (14.8821°S 142.7701°E )
