= Bamaga Road =

Road in Queensland, Australia

Bamaga Road and Telegraph Road Queensland
- Bamaga Road (blue and white)

General information
- Type: Road
- Length: 334 km (208 mi)

Major junctions
- North end: Bamaga, Queensland (Airport Road)
- South end: Peninsula Developmental Road (Junction 117 km north of Coen)

The Bamaga and Telegraph Roads link the Peninsula Developmental Road (PDR), at a junction 117 km (73 mi) north of Coen, with Airport Road in Bamaga, Queensland to the North. The southern part of the road, between PDR junction and Bramwell Junction (114 km (71 mi)), is named Telegraph Road. The northern part of the road between Bramwell Junction and Bamaga (217 km (135 mi)) is named Bamaga Road. The Bamaga and Telegraph Roads are also referred to as the Northern Peninsula Road.

== List of towns, localities and points of interest along the highway ==
- Moreton Telegraph Station
- Bramwell Junction
- Jardine River (Jardine River Ferry)
- Injinoo

== Major intersections ==
This road has no major intersections.

== Gallery ==
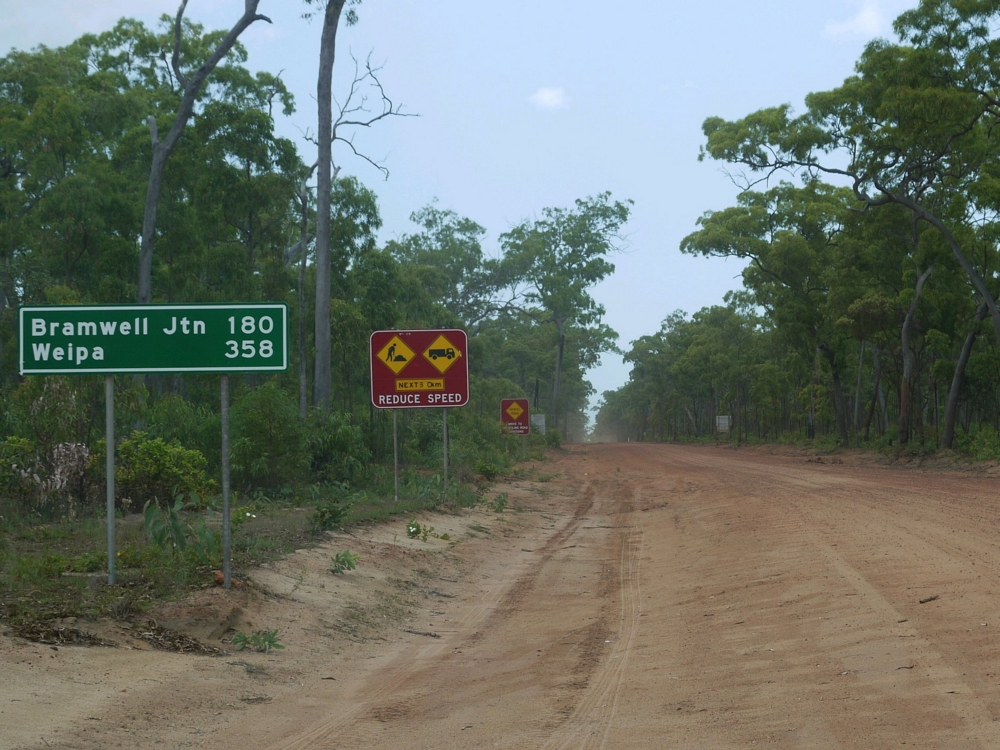
Bamaga Road, also named Northern Peninsula Road, at Jardine River

== See also ==
- List of highways in Queensland
