= Port Stewart, Queensland =

Port Stewart
- Town
- Coordinates: 14.0669°S 143.6861°E
- Country: Australia
- State: Queensland
- LGA: Shire of Cook
- Location: 66.6 km (41.4 mi) ESE of Coen; 421 km (262 mi) NW of Cooktown; 590 km (370 mi) NNW of Cairns; 2,299 km (1,429 mi) NNW of Brisbane

Government
  - State electorate: Cook
  - Federal division: Leichhardt
- Time zone: UTC+10:00 (AEST)
- Postcode: 4892

Port Stewart is a coastal town in the Shire of Cook, Queensland, Australia. The town is within the locality of Coen.

== Geography ==
The town is adjacent to the Stewart River near its mouth on the Coral Sea.

There are only a few buildings in the town.

== Education ==
There are no schools in Port Stewart, nor nearby. The alternatives are distance education and boarding school.
