= Peninsula Developmental Road =

Road in Queensland, Australia

Peninsula Developmental Road Queensland
- Map of the Cape York Peninsula, with Peninsula Developmental Road highlighted in green

General information
- Type: Rural road
- Length: 571 km (355 mi)
- Route number(s): State Route 81

Major junctions
- Southeast end: Lakeland
- Bamaga Road (Telegraph Road)
- Northwest end: Weipa

Location(s)
- Major settlements: Coen

The Peninsula Developmental Road (PDR) runs 571 km (355 mi) from Lakeland to Weipa, in the Australian state of Queensland. It is the main road transport link within Cape York Peninsula and to the rest of the Australian mainland.

The segment from Weipa Town to 43 km (27 mi) south of the town is within the Rio Tinto mine lease. The 43 km (27 mi) within the Rio Tinto mine lease boundary is not part of the Queensland Department of Transport and Main Roads-controlled road. The department excluded this 43 km (27 mi) section from its official PDR calculations.

The segment from Lakeland to the Rio Tinto boundary is 466 km (290 mi) and is under Transport and Main Roads control.

== Road conditions ==
200 km (120 mi) of 571 km (355 mi) from Lakeland to Weipa is currently unsealed road (as of April 2022). The condition of the unsealed road is highly variable. Mud, sand, dust, gravel and dirt corrugations are some of the road conditions subject to change of weather conditions.

A five-year program of sealing work joint funded by the Federal and State governments through the Cape York Region Package commenced in 2014. As of December 2015, 68.8 km (42.8 mi) of new road has been sealed through the Cape York Region Package. As at June 2019, a total of 173 km (107 mi) will be sealed under the package, leaving only 200 km (124 mi) of 571 km (355 mi) unsealed.

== Upgrades ==
The Roads of Strategic Importance initiative, last updated in March 2022, includes the following projects for the Peninsula Developmental Road.

=== Corridor upgrade ===
A lead project to upgrade the Cooktown to Weipa corridor, including the Peninsula Developmental Road and surrounding state and council roads, at an estimated cost of $323.1 million, was commenced in 2020, with an expected completion in mid-2024.

=== Progressive sealing ===
A project for progressive sealing of sections of the Peninsula Developmental Road at a cost of $190 million is planned to be completed by mid-2024.

=== Cape York community access roads ===
A project to upgrade five roads that link Cape York communities to the Peninsula Development Road, at a cost of $47.5 million is due for completion in mid-2024.

== List of towns, localities and points of interest along the highway ==
- Lakeland
- Laura
- Coen
- Archer River

== Major intersections ==
LGA	Location	km	mi	Destinations	Notes
Cook	Lakeland	0	0.0	Mulligan Highway (State Route 81) – south – Mareeba / Mulligan Highway (State Route 40) – north – Cooktown	South eastern end of Peninsula Developmental Road (State Route 81)
Weipa	Weipa	571	355	Hibberd Drive – north – Weipa Town Authority	North western end of Peninsula Developmental Road
1.000 mi = 1.609 km; 1.000 km = 0.621 mi

== See also ==
- List of highways in Queensland
