= Shire of Cook =

- Local government area
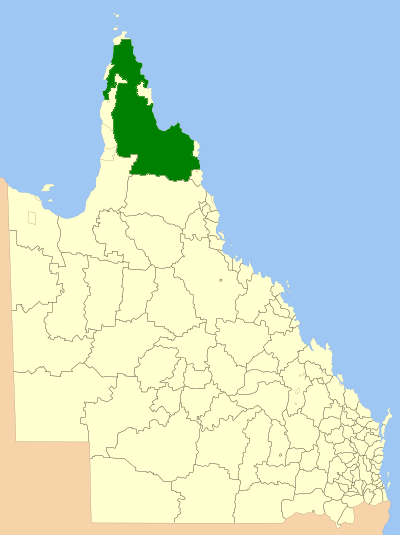
- Location within Queensland

- Interactive map of Shire of Cook
- Country: Australia
- State: Queensland
- Region: Far North Queensland
- Established: 1919
- Council seat: Cooktown

Government
  - Mayor: Robyn Holmes
  - State electorate: Cook
  - Federal division: Leichhardt

Area
  - Total: 105,719 km^{2} (40,818 sq mi)

Population
  - Total: 4,511 (2021 census)
  - Density: 0.042670/km^{2} (0.110514/sq mi)
- Website: Shire of Cook
LGAs around Shire of Cook
Northern Peninsula Area; Gulf of Carpentaria	Torres	Northern Peninsula Area
Mapoon; Napranum; Aurukun	Shire of Cook	Coral Sea; Lockhart River; Hope Vale
Carpentaria	Mareeba	Douglas

The Shire of Cook (The Shire) is a local government area in Far North Queensland, Australia. The Shire covers most of the eastern and central parts of Cape York Peninsula, the most northerly section of the Australian mainland.

It covers an area of 105,718 square kilometres (40,817.9 sq mi), and is the largest LGA in the state. The shire was established in 1919.

The Daintree and Hann Divisions were created on 11 November 1879 as two of 74 divisions around Queensland under the Divisional Boards Act 1879.

With the passage of the Local Authorities Act 1902, they became the Shires of Daintree and Hann on 31 March 1903.

On 16 January 1919, they merged to form the Shire of Cook.

The Borough of Cooktown was proclaimed as a separate municipality on 3 April 1876 under the Municipal Institutions Act 1864. On 24 August 1932, the Town of Cooktown (the successor to the Borough of Cooktown) was absorbed back into Cook Shire.

Prior to 2005, a number of Aboriginal communities administered under Deed of Grant in Trust by community councils were part of the Shire's area, but they were formally excised and given a new status as Aboriginal Shires. This formed part of the Meeting Challenges, Making Choices strategy developed in response to the Cape York Justice Study undertaken by Justice Fitzgerald QC in November 2001.

The Local Government Reform process in July 2007 concluded that amalgamation of the Shire would not result in any benefits to service delivery and management for the area, noting that it was (and is) the largest local government by area and had no community of interest with any neighbouring areas. The council was, however, reduced from seven to six councillors with an additional elected mayor.

In the 2021 census, the Shire of Cook had a population of 4,511 people.

== Towns and localities ==
The Shire of Cook includes the following settlements:

- Cooktown (pop 1,336)
- Laura (pop 570)
- Coen (pop 253)
- Archer River
- Ayton
- Bloomfield^{1}
- Dixie
- Ebagoola
- Edward River
- Helenvale
- Holroyd River
- Hope Vale^{2}
- Iron Range
- Jardine River
- Lakefield
- Lakeland
- Laura, Queensland
- Lizard
- Lizard Island
- Lockhart River^{3}
- Mapoon^{4}
- Marton
- Merapah
- Mission River
- Moojeeba
- Palmer
- Port Stewart
- Portland Road
- Rossville
- Shelburne
- Starcke
- Wenlock
- Yarraden

^{1} – shared with the Shire of Douglas

^{2} – shared with the Aboriginal Shire of Hope Vale

^{3} – shared with the Aboriginal Shire of Lockhart River

^{4} – shared with the Aboriginal Shire of Mapoon

And also a number of islands in the Coral Sea, including:

- Raine Island
- Lizard Island (in the locality of Lizard)

== Libraries ==
The Cook Shire Council operates public libraries at Bloomfield and Cooktown.

== Chairmen and mayors ==
- 1901–1904: John Hargreaves
- 1927: H. L. Lee
- 2008–present : Peter Hugh Scott

== Demographics ==
The population of the Shire of Cook, along with Torres, Aurukun and Mornington, have been singled out by the Australian Bureau of Statistics (ABS), who conduct the quinquennial census, as particularly difficult to measure accurately. Reasons for this include cultural and language barriers, transport and geographical spread of the population, who are mostly located in isolated communities. As such, all figures are likely to be lower than the actual population on the census date. Additionally, prior to 1971, Aboriginal people who form a majority of the population were not counted in census statistics.

Until 1 July 2002, the Australian Bureau of Statistics included the Island and DOGIT councils within the Shire of Cook statistical local area. Information for the reduced Shire back to 1996 has been provided on the ABS website through the Time Series Profile.

Year	Population	Notes
1933	2,068	
1947	1,139	
1954	1,545	
1961	1,869	
1966	2,463	
1971	5,538	
1976	6,128	
1981	4,456	
1986	4,776	
1991	8,785	
1996	5,232	
2001 census	9,409	
2006 census	3,464	
2011 census	4,152	
2016 census	4,167	
2021 census	4,511	

== Indigenous languages ==
Guugu Yimithirr (also known as Koko Yindjir, Gugu Yimidhirr, Guguyimidjir) is an Australian Aboriginal language of Hope Vale and the Cooktown area. The language region includes the local government area of the Aboriginal Shire of Hope Vale and the Shire of Cook, particularly the localities of Cape Bedford, Battle Camp and sections of the Normanby River and Annan River.

Kuku-Thaypan (also known as Gugu Dhayban, Kuku Taipan, Thaypan) is an Australian Aboriginal language spoken in Hann River, Laura and Musgrave River and on Mornington Island, within the local government boundaries of the Cook Shire.

Kuku Yalanji (also known as Gugu Yalanji, Kuku Yalaja, and Kuku Yelandji) is an Australian Aboriginal language of the Mossman and Daintree areas of North Queensland. The language region includes areas within the local government area of Shire of Douglas and Shire of Cook, particularly the localities of Mossman, Daintree, Bloomfield River, China Camp, Maytown, Palmer, Cape Tribulation and Wujal Wujal.

Yupanguthi (also known as Yuputhimri, Jupangati, Yupangathi, Nggerikudi, Yupungati, Jupangati) is an Australian Aboriginal language spoken on Yupanguthi country. The Yupanguthi language region includes the landscape within the local government boundaries of the landscape within the local government boundaries of the Shire of Cook.

Linngithigh (also known as Winda Winda and Linginiti) is an Australian Aboriginal language spoken by the Linngithigh people. The Linngithigh language region includes landscape within the local government boundaries of the Cook Shire Council: Western Cape York, Winda Winda Creek, Mission River, and Archer River.

Luthigh (also known as Lotiga, Tepiti and Uradhi, see also Uradhi related languages) is an Australian Aboriginal language spoken by the Luthigh people. The traditional language area for Luthigh includes landscape within the local government boundaries of the Cook Shire: Eastern Cape York, Ducie River, Northern Peninsula, New Mapoon, Injinoo, and Cowal Creek.

Yalanji (also known as Kuku Yalanji, Kuku Yalaja, Kuku Yelandji, and Gugu Yalanji) is an Australian Aboriginal language of Far North Queensland. The traditional language region is Mossman River in the south to the Annan River in the north, bordered by the Pacific Ocean in the east and extending inland to west of Mount Mulgrave. This includes the local government boundaries of the Shire of Douglas, the Shire of Cook and the Aboriginal Shire of Wujal Wujal and the towns and localities of Cooktown, Mossman, Daintree, Cape Tribulation and Wujal Wujal. It includes the head of the Palmer River, the Bloomfield River, China Camp, Maytown, and Palmerville.

Yir Yiront (also known as Yiront, Jirjoront, Yir-yiront, and Kokomindjan) is an Australian Aboriginal language. Its traditional language region is in Western Cape York within the local government areas of Aboriginal Shire of Kowanyama and Shire of Cook, in the catchments of the Coleman River and Mitchell River. Following the removal of Aboriginal people from their traditional lands, it is also spoken in Pormpuraaw and Kowanyama.

Kuuku Ya'u (also known as Gugu Yau, Yao, Ya'o, Koko Ya'o and Koka-yao) is an Australian Aboriginal language. The traditional language area of Kuuku Ya'u includes landscape within the local government boundaries of the Cook Shire: Eastern Cape York, Uu'ungun south to Claudie River and hinterland.

Kuuk Thaayorre (also known as Koko-Daiyuri, Kuku Yak, Thayorre, and used as a generic name for several related languages/dialects) is an Australian Aboriginal Language spoken on Western Cape York, particularly in the area around Pormpuraaw (Edward River). The Thaayorre language region includes the landscape within Pormpuraaw Community Council and the Cook Shire Council.
