= Coen, Queensland =

Coen
- Town
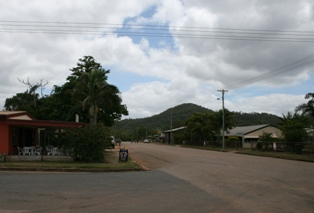
- Coen, 2012

- Interactive map of Coen
- Coordinates: 13.9436°S 143.1986°E
- Country: Australia
- State: Queensland
- LGA: Shire of Cook
- Location: 228 km (142 mi) NNW of Laura; 263 km (163 mi) SE of Weipa; 381 km (237 mi) NW of Cooktown; 556 km (345 mi) NW of Cairns; 2,231 km (1,386 mi) NNW of Brisbane

Government
  - State electorate: Cook
  - Federal division: Leichhardt

Area
  - Total: 9,735.2 km^{2} (3,758.8 sq mi)
- Elevation: 199 m (653 ft)

Population
  - Total: 320 (2021 census)
  - Density: 0.0329/km^{2} (0.0851/sq mi)
- Time zone: UTC+10:00 (AEST)
- Postcode: 4871
- Mean max temp: 30.2 °C (86.4 °F)
- Mean min temp: 20.0 °C (68.0 °F)
- Annual rainfall: 1,183.3 mm (46.59 in)
Localities around Coen
Archer River	Lockhart River	Lockhart River
Archer River	Coen	Coral Sea
Holroyd River	Yarraden	Coral Sea

Coen is a rural town and coastal locality in the Shire of Cook, Queensland, Australia. The town is situated inland, on the Peninsula Developmental Road, the main road on the Cape York Peninsula in far north Queensland. The community is quite busy, particularly in the dry season, because tourists and visitors travelling on the Peninsula Development Road up to the tip of Cape York have to pass through the town.

In the 2021 census, the locality of Coen had a population of 320 people.

== Geography ==
The locality of Coen is on the eastern side of the Cape York Peninsula with the Coral Sea forming its eastern boundary. Part of the northern boundary follows the Archer River, while the Coen River forms part of its western boundary. The Peninsula Developmental Road runs roughly north to south through the locality.

Though the town falls within the boundaries of the Shire of Cook, the town is about 400 kilometres (250 mi) from the shire's headquarters in Cooktown, about a 6.5 hour drive.

Moojeeba is a town in the south-east of the locality on the northern bank of the Stewart River (14.0791°S 143.6486°E).

Port Stewart is a town also on the northern bank of the Stewart River but closer to the river mouth into the Coral Sea (14.0669°S 143.6861°E).

== History ==
The Coen area is the traditional homeland of the Kaanju people. Kaanju (also known as Kaanju and Kandju) is a language of the Cape York Peninsula. The Kaanju language, now known as Southern Kaantju language, the local language of the region, is spoken in the area within the local government boundaries of the Shire of Cook.

In 1623, Jan Carstensz, the navigator of the ship Pera of the Dutch East India Company, named a river on Cape York Peninsula after Jan Pieterszoon Coen, the Governor-General of the Dutch East Indies. Today that river is known as the Archer River and the name Coen River is given to one of its tributaries.

The Coen district was first settled by Europeans following the exploration of Cape York Peninsula by William Hann in 1872. Hann's party discovered gold on the Palmer River, southwest of Cooktown. After hearing of the discovery, James Mulligan led an expedition to the Palmer River in 1873. A government surveyor, A. C. Macmillan, with a group of engineers protected by a consignment of native police, blazed a track from Cooktown to the Palmer River goldfields in October 1873.

In 1876, Robert Sefton found gold at the Coen River after leading a prospecting party into the interior of the Cape York Peninsula. He built a log fort there for protection from any hostility from local Aboriginal groups and prospected for gold in the surrounding country. In 1878, there was a gold rush to Coen following Sefton's return to Cooktown with 140 ounces of gold. About 500 miners flocked to the Coen field, but exploration further afield was not possible due to the danger of being attacked by local Aboriginal people. The alluvial gold was soon extracted and the miners began leaving after the discovery of gold at Lukinville on the Lower Palmer River.

In 1879, geologist Robert Logan Jack led a government-sponsored exploration of Cape York Peninsula. Jack left Cooktown and travelled up the Coen track previously marked out by Sefton, where they encountered Aboriginal people in great numbers:

"Most of them were frightened of the white men having, no doubt, learnt a few lessons at the muzzles of Snider rifles in the hands of the diggers travelling the Coen track".

In 1880, it was reported that about 350 Chinese miners had returned to the Coen goldfield. Due to the fierce resistance of local Aboriginal people, European settlement on the McIvor and Coen Rivers only took a tentative hold during the early 1880s. In 1881, the first settlers on those rivers had to retreat to Cooktown. A Cooktown newspaper correspondent reported that:

"The McIvor country is now completely abandoned …I fear it will be some time before there is any attempt to stock the country again, as the blacks are likely to be very troublesome to the next party which goes out. I am informed that there are still two Europeans and ten Chinese prospecting about the Coen, but all the teams and cattle have come in".

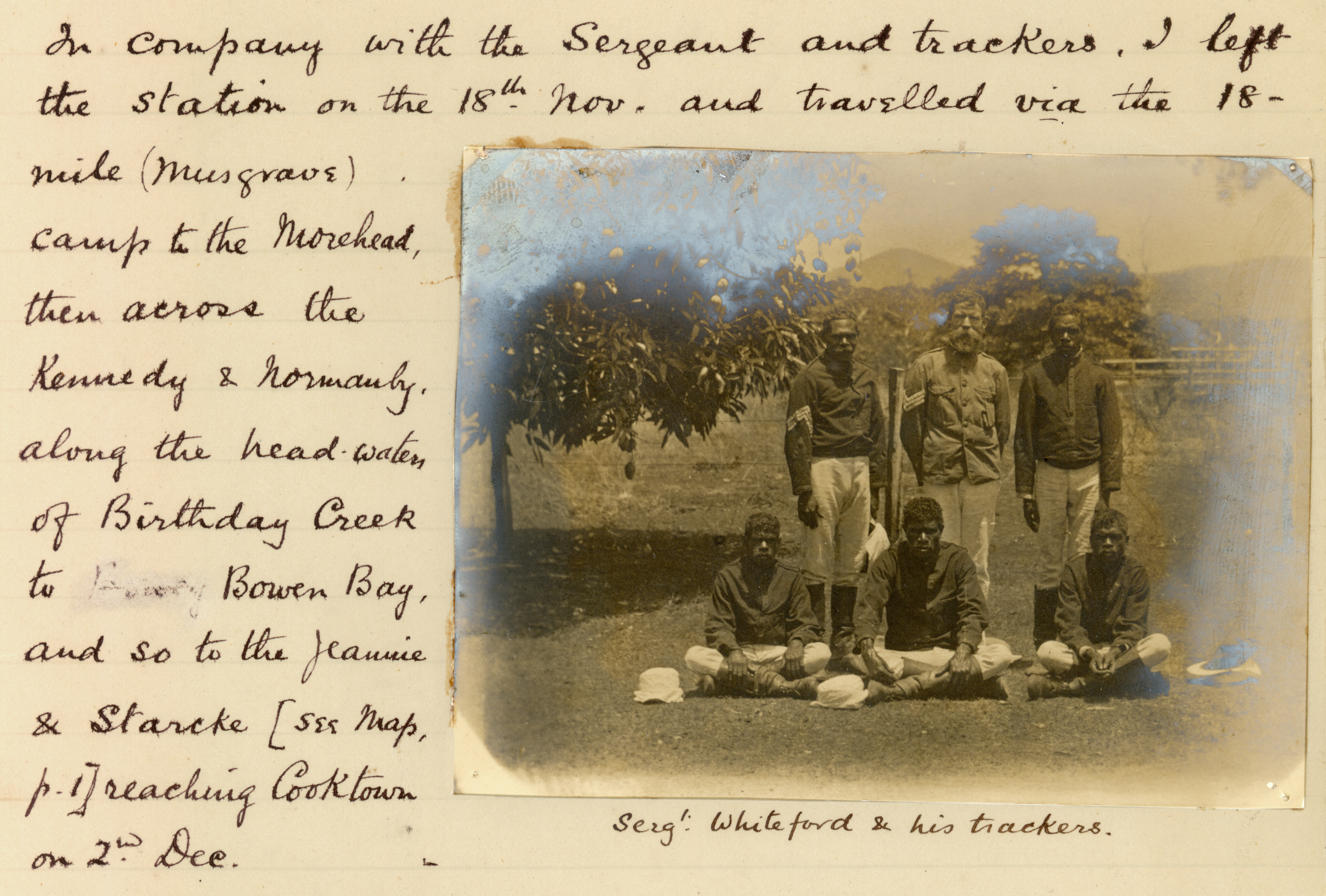
Sergeant Whiteford and the Aboriginal trackers, 1898

The Overland Telegraph to the Cape York Peninsula was built between 1883 and 1887 and European expansion and settlement accelerated. European settlement progressed into the Peninsula with the help of native police protection after a native police camp was established at McIvor in 1886 and at Coen in 1888. The Aboriginal people in the Coen district adapted to European settlement by moving onto the newly established cattle stations where they became stockmen and domestic labour. Some worked in the mines and a few were employed in Coen. Several men were attached to the Coen police station as trackers. Others continued to live as they always had. In 1947, an extended family group was found by the police near the Archer River and brought into Coen. The police reported that the group were living a "traditional" lifestyle and had had very little contact with western civilisation.

Around 1890, reef gold was found at Coen and mining recommenced. In 1892, Coen had a population of approximately 125 people, including a small population of 25 Chinese immigrants who prospected for gold and worked their market gardens. The buildings at Coen comprised a hotel, store, butcher's shop, blacksmith's shop and a row of 6 cottages occupied by miners and their families. The police camp was situated 2 miles from town on the Coen River and the telegraph station was 1 mile from town on Lankelly Creek. Supplies to Coen were transported from Cooktown to the Port Stewart store and from there bullock teams transported goods the 40 miles to Coen.

Coen Post Office opened on 20 June 1893 (a receiving office had been open from 1888).

Coen Provisional School opened on 6 May 1895. On 1 January 1909, it became Coen State School. It closed in 1929 but reopened circa 1948. In January 2010, it became a campus of the Western Cape College. In January 2012, it became a campus of the Cape York Aboriginal Australian Academy.

In 1897, the Queensland Parliament passed the Aboriginal Protection and Restriction of the Sale of Opium Act 1897, which granted the Home Secretar the power "to cause every aboriginal within any District, not being an aboriginal exempted from the provisions of this section, to be removed to, and kept within the limits of, any reserve situated within such District, in such manner, and subject to such conditions, as may be prescribed". Over 300 Aboriginal people were removed from the Coen district to Aboriginal reserves. Almost half of those removed were sent to Palm Island. Included in this number were the Lama Lama people of the Stewart River area who had been dispossessed of their lands by European pastoral expansion into their country in the late 19th century. They formed a community at the Stewart River on what is now Silver Plains Station, near the site of the Moojeeba township. In the 1930s, they were removed to Lockhart River Mission but later returned to Port Stewart.

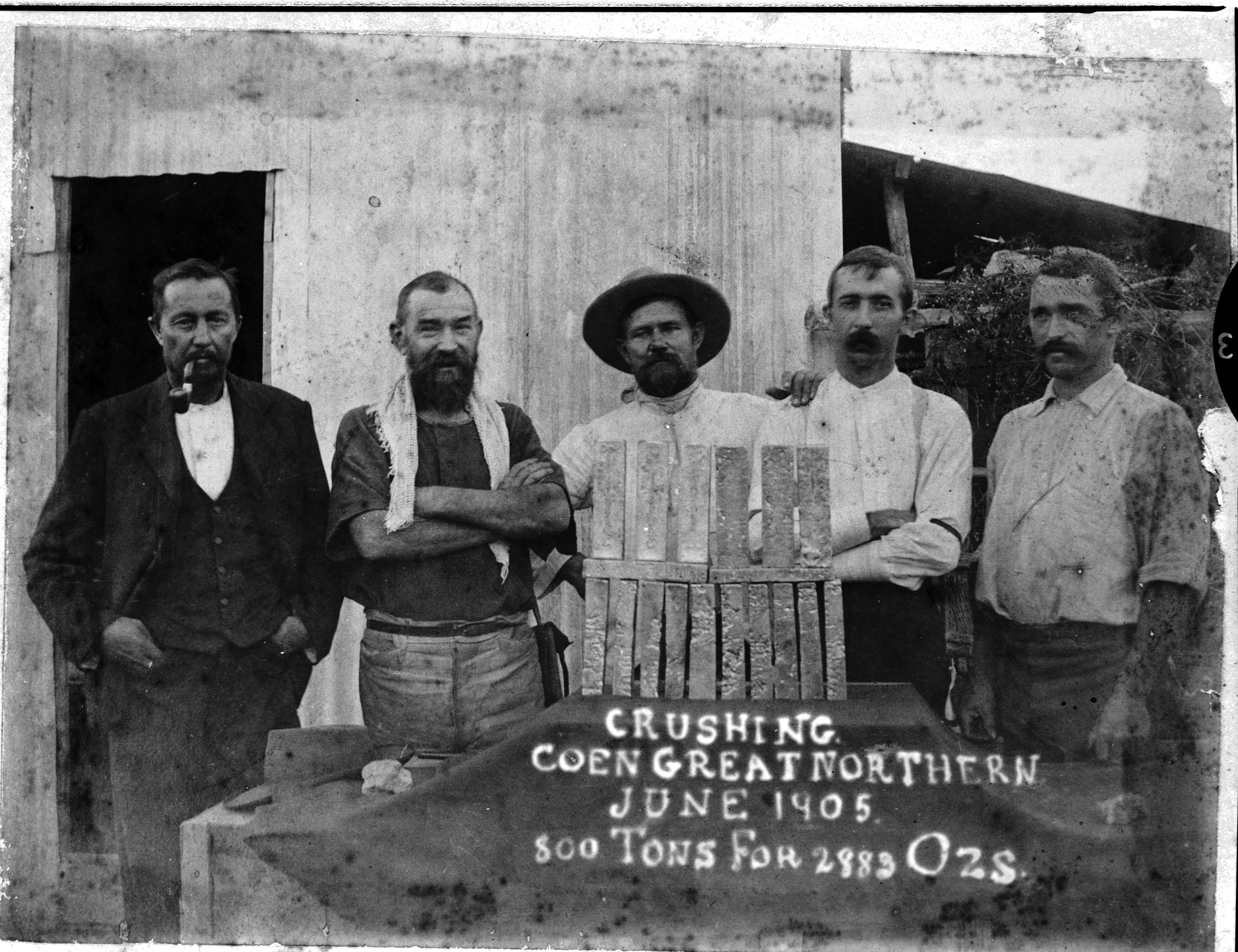
Great Northern Mine's crushing statistics, 1905

The Great Northern mine continued operations until 1916 and produced some 52,000 troy ounces (1,600 kg) of gold before it closed.

As gold mining declined from around the 1930s, Coen still remained an important administrative and social centre for the surrounding Cape York Peninsula communities.

In the 1930s, mainly older Aboriginal people from the Munkan, Kaanju and Lama Lama lived scattered around Coen, living in bark and stick huts. In 1939, there was an influx of Aboriginal people who had earlier been removed from Coen to Lockhart River, and others from Ebagoola and the Archer River. A more permanent camp was then established. As the camp increased in size, the Director of Native Affairs was in favour of removing everyone to Lockhart River Mission to avoid the expense associated with providing services to the camp. However, the local protector opposed the proposal saying that:

"your suggestion to send these old people to Lockhart River is unthinkable. If you send them there they will only walk back to their own native country. Coen is their home, their native land, and at least they might be happy in the knowledge that they might die in the place where they first saw the light of day"

The local Coen protector arranged for the Aboriginal people who were working to contribute to the cost of camp improvements and, under those terms, they were allowed to stay at Coen.

During World War II, Coen was an important part of the forward defence network. In October 1942, detachments of 16 Australian Field Company, Royal Australian Engineers travelled to Cooktown, Mount Surprise and Coen to build Repeater Huts.

In May 1944, 14 acres were gazetted near Coen as an Aboriginal reserve. The reserve was located south of the town on the Coen River between Oscar and Spring Creeks. Over time, more buildings were erected on the reserve and a market garden established. In 1961, the reserve between Oscar and Spring Creeks was closed and a new Aboriginal reserve established. The new reserve was located closer to the town on the Coen River, opposite the cemetery.

Isolation was a challenge in Coen, in particular in regard to communication, with one of the last pack horse runs in Queensland operating out of Coen as late as the 1950s. As well, until the 1960s, when the Weipa-Bamaga area was developed, Coen was the most northerly town on Cape York Peninsula.

In 1961, the owner of the Silver Plains Station falsely accused the Lama Lama people of harassing stock. The accusations came as a response to the Lama Lama people refusing to work on the station at under-award rates of pay. The Lama Lama were removed to Cowal Creek, after being tricked into believing they were going to Thursday Island for a medical check-up. Some families walked back to Coen. Eventually, the majority resettled themselves at Coen.

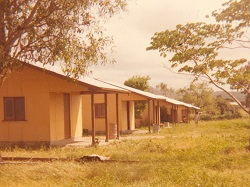
Reserve huts, Coen

In the late 1970s, the introduction of equal wages for Aboriginal pastoral workers saw the disappearance of work on pastoral stations for many Aboriginal people, and the permanent population of Coen grew to its present size. The Queensland Government funded the construction of houses at Coen during the 1970s.

In 1987, the Lama Lama people at Coen started petitioning the Queensland Government for a grant of land on their traditional country at Port Stewart. In 1989, the Department of Aboriginal and Islander Affairs gave the Lama Lama people a vehicle so that they could maintain an outstation at Port Stewart.

By 1990, the Department of Family Services and Aboriginal and Islander Affairs owned 12 houses in the town of Coen, and 12 at the Aboriginal reserve opposite the cemetery. In the 1990s, the Aboriginal population of Coen had split into two different family groups. One group continued to live at the Aboriginal reserve opposite the cemetery and the other had taken up residence down the river at the council camping reserve. These two groups continue to live separately today.

In 1993, the Coen Regional Aboriginal Corporation was established, with its administration centre located in Coen. This was a non-statutory corporation, incorporated under the Commonwealth Aboriginal Councils and Association Act 1976, and provides services to the Coen Aboriginal community and outstations in the region. The corporation helped facilitate the increase in the outstation or ‘homelands’ movement in the region. Many more people were now able to use the semi-permanent camps they have established on their traditional lands]. Outstations belonging to the different groups in the Coen district include Stoney Creek, Langi, Port Stewart, Wenlock, Puntimu and Glen Garland. As at 2017, there were up to 12 outstations in the district.

On 3 July 2014, Barry Port retired from the Queensland Police. He was Australia's last Aboriginal police tracker. In his 36 years working for the police, he has tracked criminals, missing people and stowaways.

== Demographics ==
In the 2011 census, the locality of Coen had a population of 416 people, of whom 286 (68.6%) identify as Indigenous.

In the 2016 census, the locality of Coen had a population of 364 people, of whom 297 (79.8%) identify as Indigenous.

In the 2021 census, the locality of Coen had a population of 320 people, of whom 236 (73.8%) identify as Indigenous.

== Education ==
Coen Campus is a primary (Prep-6) campus of the Cape York Aboriginal Australian Academy. It is on the Peninsula Developmental Road (13.9455°S 143.1999°E).

There are no secondary schools in Coen nor nearby. Distance education and boarding schools are the alternatives.

== Facilities ==
Today Coen provides services to the region, and is an important supply point on the long unpaved road leading to Weipa and other northern communities. It is a popular stopping point for tourists driving to the tip of Cape York - the northernmost part of the Australian mainland.

It has an airstrip at Coen Airport (24 kilometres (15 mi) north of the town), public library, hotel/motel, guest house, general store with a fuel outlet, mechanic, medical clinic, post office, police station, camping grounds, primary school kindergarten, ranger base and more. There is a scheduled air service to Lockhart and Cairns four times a week.

Our Lady of the Way Catholic Church is at 1 Armbrust Street (corner of Taylor Street, 13.94527°S 143.20074°E). It is within the Cooktown Parish of the Roman Catholic Diocese of Cairns.

There is a boat ramp at Port Stewart into the Stewart River (14.0652°S 143.6876°E). It is managed by the Cook Shire Council.

== Attractions ==
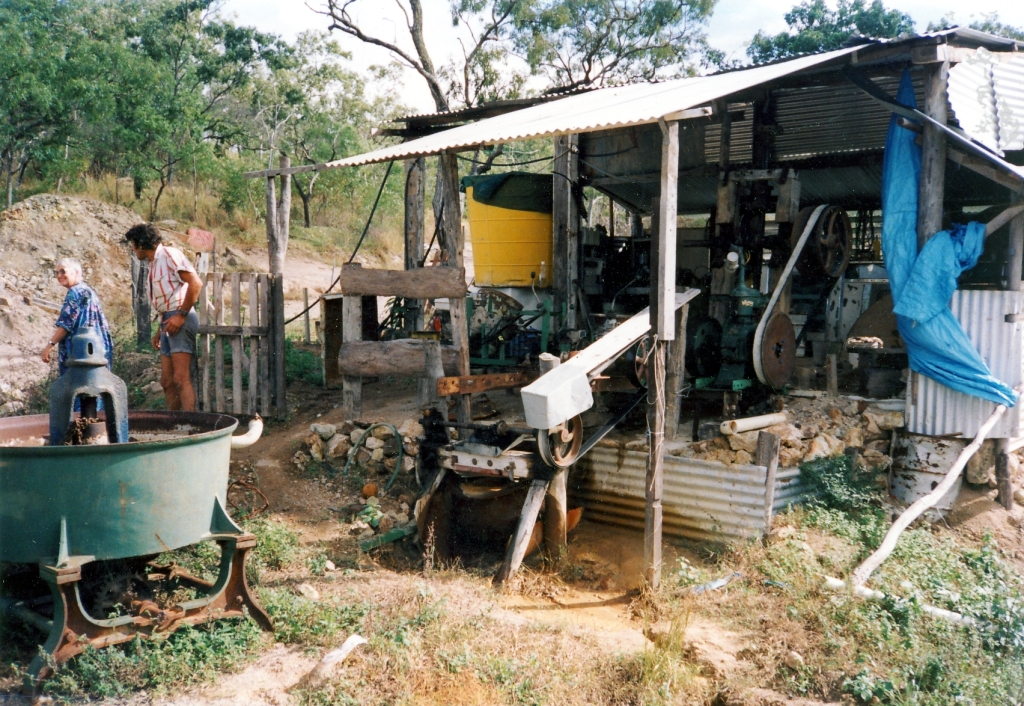
Small gold mine near Coen. 1990

Coen is a popular destination for birdwatchers, with large and varied bird fauna with representatives from rainforests, monsoon forests, and coastal forests. There are also camping sites in the area, along with a local historical museum.

== Heritage listings ==
Coen has a number of heritage-listed sites, including:

- Coen Carrier Station, Coleman Close (13.9399°S 143.1989°E).

== Climate ==
Coen has a tropical savanna climate (Aw) with distinct wet and dry seasons. Daytime temperatures are usually over 30 °C (86 °F) most of the year. The dry season runs from May to October. The temperatures in this season can drop below 10 °C (50 °F) in the coolest months between May and August, and it can peak further above 35 °C (95 °F) in the build up months between September and November. The wet season occurs from December to March and is characterized by frequent torrential downpours and high humidity. This season is also generally associated with the arrival of the monsoon trough and tropical cyclones.

Climate data for Coen
Month	Jan	Feb	Mar	Apr	May	Jun	Jul	Aug	Sep	Oct	Nov	Dec	Year
Record high °C (°F)	38.4 (101.1)	38.0 (100.4)	36.0 (96.8)	34.5 (94.1)	34.7 (94.5)	34.3 (93.7)	33.6 (92.5)	35.2 (95.4)	37.6 (99.7)	39.5 (103.1)	40.6 (105.1)	40.0 (104.0)	40.6 (105.1)
Mean daily maximum °C (°F)	32.1 (89.8)	31.2 (88.2)	31.1 (88.0)	30.6 (87.1)	29.9 (85.8)	28.8 (83.8)	28.5 (83.3)	29.5 (85.1)	31.1 (88.0)	32.8 (91.0)	34.1 (93.4)	33.7 (92.7)	31.1 (88.0)
Mean daily minimum °C (°F)	23.4 (74.1)	23.4 (74.1)	23.1 (73.6)	21.9 (71.4)	20.1 (68.2)	17.8 (64.0)	17.1 (62.8)	17.4 (63.3)	18.7 (65.7)	20.7 (69.3)	22.4 (72.3)	23.3 (73.9)	20.8 (69.4)
Record low °C (°F)	19.2 (66.6)	20.0 (68.0)	17.9 (64.2)	12.2 (54.0)	11.5 (52.7)	9.5 (49.1)	7.5 (45.5)	7.8 (46.0)	11.0 (51.8)	10.0 (50.0)	16.3 (61.3)	18.5 (65.3)	7.5 (45.5)
Average rainfall mm (inches)	306.1 (12.05)	303.5 (11.95)	256.2 (10.09)	74.5 (2.93)	11.4 (0.45)	3.4 (0.13)	1.4 (0.06)	1.5 (0.06)	0.8 (0.03)	13.2 (0.52)	58.9 (2.32)	152.2 (5.99)	1,183.1 (46.58)
Average rainy days	19.4	19.7	17.5	7.8	3.4	1.4	1.2	1.0	0.7	1.8	5.4	11.4	90.7
Average relative humidity (%)	72.5	77.5	74.0	67.0	65.0	62.5	60.0	56.0	51.5	49.5	53.5	62.0	62.6
Source: Australian Bureau of Meteorology

== Sources ==
- Moon, Ron & Viv. 2003. Cape York: An Adventurer's Guide. 9th edition. Moon Adventure Publications, Pearcedale, Victoria. ISBN 0-9578766-4-5
- Roberts, Jan. 1981. Massacres to Mining: The Colonization of Aboriginal Australia. Dove Communications, Blackburn, Victoria. Rev. Australian ed. Previous ed.: CIMRA and War on Want, 1978, London. ISBN 0-85924-171-8.
- Premier's Department (prepared by Connell Wagner). 1989. Cape York Peninsula Resource Analysis. Cairns. (1989). ISBN 0-7242-7008-6
- Ryan, Michelle and Burwell, Colin, eds. 2000. Wildlife of Tropical North Queensland: Cooktown to Mackay. Queensland Museum, Brisbane. ISBN 0-85905-045-9 (set of 3 vols).
- Scarth-Johnson, Vera. 2000. National Treasures: Flowering plants of Cooktown and Northern Australia. Vera Scarth-Johnson Gallery Association, Cooktown. ISBN 0-646-39726-5 (pbk); ISBN 0-646-39725-7 Limited Edition - Leather Bound.
- Sutton, Peter (ed). Languages of Cape York: Papers presented to a Symposium organised by the Australian Institute of Aboriginal Studies. Australian Institute of Aboriginal Studies, Canberra. (1976). ISBN 0-85575-046-4
- Wallace, Lennie. 2003. Cape York Peninsula: A History of Unlauded Heroes 1845-2003. Central Queensland University Press, Rockhampton. ISBN 1-876780-43-6
- Wynter, Jo and Hill, John. 1991. Cape York Peninsula: Pathways to Community Economic Development. The Final Report of The Community Economic Development Projects Cook Shire. Cook Shire Council.

== Attribution ==
This article contains text from "Aboriginal and Torres Strait Islander community histories: Coen". Queensland Government. 19 July 2017. Published under CC-BY-4.0 licence
