= Wik-Mungkan people =

Aboriginal Australian people

The Wik-Mungkan people are an Aboriginal Australian group of peoples who traditionally ranged over an extensive area of the western Cape York Peninsula in northern Queensland and speak the Wik Mungkan language. They were the largest branch of the Wik people.

== History ==
Making an inference from the number of clans and their members, anthropologist Ursula McConnel calculated that traditionally the Wik-Mungkan must have numbered some 1,500 to 2,000 people. In 1930, McConnel estimated that there were 50 to 100 Wik-Mungkan people living around the Archer River and 200 living on the Kendall and Edward Rivers, a demographic drop in the order of 60%-75%. A combination of traders taking off men to work on the coast, introduced disease, cattle ranchers squeezing them off their hunting grounds, and occasional punitive forays to wipe out entire camps account for the reduction. At the turn of the 20th century a coastal reserve was set aside for them on the Gulf. The 2021 Australian census recorded 952 speakers of the Wik Mungkan language.

== Language ==
Wik Mungkan is a form of Paman which is a subset of the broader Pama-Nyungan language family, and closely related to Kugu Nganhcara. Wik means "speech" It is spoken around Aurukun and the Edward River (including Pormpuraaw, the site of the old Edward River Mission). Uniquely among Wik language speakers, where speech styles are defined in terms of some distinctive lexical feature, those whose mother tongue is Wik Mungkan use "eating" as a classifier for their tongue (Wik Mungkan literally means "language-eat"), a definition borrowed from their inland clans, whose neighbouring east coast peoples employ forms of the verb "eat" to distinguish their dialect differences.

== Ecology ==
Wik-Mungkan territory covered a strip of land from 30 to 50 miles wide running parallel to the Gulf of Carpentaria, but separated from it by coastal peoples such as the Wik-Natera or Wik-Kalkan who lived south of the Archer River. Their land, extending over 7,800 square kilometres (3,000 sq mi), was watered by five major watercourses, the Watson, Archer, Kendall, Holroyd and Edward rivers flowing down to the west of the Great Dividing Range to the coast of the Gulf of Carpentaria. A variety of distinct habitats exist, from flat woodlands to mangrove to rocky ridged spurs and poor melon hole land, the last separating them from the peoples to their east.

The year had two seasons-the dry May to November period under south-east winds, broken by the onset of storms and humid conditions with the brief wet season, beginning in November, with north-westerlies blowing in from December continuing through to April, resulting in extensive flooding of the coastal flatlands. A division of labour existed, with men hunting and women foraging, armed with a digging stick (katjan) and a dillybag. Yams (mai watea) and arrowroot (mai woppa) were a wet season staple, followed by waterlilies. In the wet season they camped in the upper reaches of the riverine system. Their inland hunting grounds were of three types: grass plains, river courses and thickly timbered forest lands. As the dry-season came to an end, they would build dams and kiddles to trap fish swimming up river as the rains began to restock the rivers. A particular type of vine containing a poisonous substance that would spur fish to leap out of the water was used to dose waterholes, allowing them to be captured from the banks.

Fire-stick farming was employed annually at the start of the dry season to flush wallabies and other prey from their grassland haunts, or, once a patch of land was consumed by a controlled blaze, to allow the women to fossick for bandicoots, snakes, goannas and other small game in their burrows. They trained their dogs to refrained from eating prey they managed to quarry.

Abundant food could be readily secured on the grass plains: nutritious roots and fruit could be culled by foraging, while hunting could rely on wallaby, ducks, ibis, flying foxes jabiru and emu. The wooded hill areas abounded in iguana, snakes and opossums, while extensive stands of flowering bloodwood and messmate yielded up plentiful supplies of honey. The rivers were well stocked with fish, such as sardine-fish, Catfish, Rock cod, white fish, schnapper, barramundi and stingray, all speared from swiftly paddled canoes breasting the incoming tides and even the poor country around the Kendall river supplied rich stocks of bream. Two types of crocodile were hunted, the upper river Freshwater crocodile and the estuarine saltwater crocodile: the eggs of the former were a winter staple in the upland rivers. The roots of a coastal swamp rush called panja was an important vegetable source towards the end of the dry season. Cooking ovens were improvised by lighting a fire in a hole, fanning it to flame with feathers plucked from a black-necked stork (jabiru). Pieces of ant-bed (termite mound) were then spread on the coals, and food laid out on top, with a tea-tree bark cover placed on top, and the whole lidded with sand to make a slow bake.

Increase ceremonies, while thought of as ensuring the food supplies of any one clan in whose territory they were conducted, also catered to distant relatives in other peoples who would be invited in to partake of the abundance once a given territorial group had had its fill.

== Social and kinship system ==
McConnel's initial reports state that the clans were patrilineal. Claude Lévi-Strauss reports that though marriage among the Wik-Mungkan was matrilateral, (Note: While genealogies show a preference in these tribes for the marriage of a man with his mother's brother's daughter (a woman with her father's sister's son) there are records of marriages with the father's sister's daughter (a woman's mother's brother's son) and quite a number of marriages with the father's father's sister's family. I understand that a woman may marry her mother's brother's son, i.e. a man his father's sister's daughter, provided that the link on the other parent's side is discontinued. In other words, the system is one-sided, with a distinct preference for the mother's side.) marrying one's father's sister's daughter, and one's mother's brother's daughter, was allowed. A strict ban prohibited only bi-lateral cousin marriage.

Exogamy meant kinship networks ran through the clans, meaning that in times of local abundance in any variety of food stock, relatives outside a given clan area would be called in to partake of the bounty, creating on such occasions large encampments.) The elderly were well-cared for, having a right to certain foods forbidden to the more active people, who would supply them with choice snake and stingray food that was taboo to the younger members. The centre of family life was the hearth, reflected in the words for father (pan tuma: man of the fire) and mother (wantya tuma: woman of the fire).

McConnel described the Wik-Mingkan kinship and marriage system in 1934, arguing that, in its essentials, with minor variants, it could be extended to apply to all the Wik peoples. Affirming that in its general lines it reflected the general structure typical of Australian Aboriginal peoples, differing only in lacking a 4 or 8 section system, she discerned 5 features:(1) localised exogamous (patrilineal) clans; (2) with each people divided into two exogamous moieties; (3) with sororate and levirate marriage; (4) modified cross-cousin marriage; (5) with a comprehensive classificatory terminology.

Runaway marriage (maritji) was accepted as orthodox if the kinship link considered the couple's relationship licit. When mimicked by theatrical performances of the practice at large corroborees, maritji often elicits much laughter. Bride kidnapping, though traditionally practised when no spouse could be obtained by the usual means, was, according to a white informant, undertaken by formal prearrangements made between the raiding people and the group from whom the woman was to be "snatched", so the actual raid was a symbolic artifice rather than an act of violent intertribal competition for a scarce resource.

The Wik-Mungkan call coastal neighbours north of the Archer and Watson rivers "bad speech" (Wik-waiya) peoples (such as the Anjingit, the Aritingiti, the Adetingiti and Lengiti) because they find their languages difficult to understand.

=== Totem system by territory ===
The word for totem was pulwaiya, roughly "old forebear", whose place of origin thereby became an auwa or totemic ritual site, and the place where one returns to on death. The Wik-Mungkan are thought to have been composed of approximately 30 patrilineal clans, each with distinct territorial rights, before the white man's arrival. A clan could have more than one totem, and they were complementary to each other, not reduplicated. (Note: One exception was the bushrat totem, found in several peoples.) One's clan totem influenced one's birth name. Thus a member of the "meteor" totem could receive the name Aka(ground)-battana (hits), and the kangaroo totem could endow a child with the name pampointjalama (kangaroo sniffs the air and smells a man). The prefix mai refers to vegetable food (maiyi), while that of min refers to meat (minya).

Where confusion exists as to the precise state of a clan, those which are numbered (a) (b) etc., indicate presumed sections of one clan, though the totemic groups thus listed may have been independent.

Archer River (Note: McConnel also locates a fire (tuma) totem site on the Archer at a place called Tumauwa, close to red rock on the river, but omits to include it in her general list)

- I (a) pikua (salt water crocodile (Note: There is a crocodile magic of making this fear species out of a goanna to become one's son, who will do the father's bidding in fishing and killing enemies));(b) min wunkam ("night-fish"); mai anka (white fruit).
- 2 (a)mai korpi (black mangrove); (b) min wolkollan (bone-fish); (Note: its auwa is found on the Adeda creek of the lower Archer) (c)neanya (fly); (d)min tatta (frog); moiya (bullroarer).
- 3 (a) kongkong (white fish-hawk); (Note: associated with a place called Merokman) (b) min parkanjan (small hawk); (c) min tempi (swamp duck); (d) min mantaba (plains turkey); (Note: auwa is in a lagoon south of the Archer where no one may swim) (e) min wunkam (Rock cod); (f) min tuttha (parrot); (g) mai ariki (blue water-lily); (Note: the auwa is at Taimanir) (h) wanka (string dilly bag); (i) puntamen (fishing net).
- 4 (a) mai umpia (water-lily root); (Note: its auwa is at Taiam a lagoon on the Archer) (b) mai wuma (water lily seed)
- 5 (a) mai maitji (bush-nut); (Note: its auwa is at Panam, a small creek feeding into the Archer) (b) min jintan (a type of fish); (c) min ekka (freshwater mussel); (d) mai neanya (a black fruit) (e) mai neitja (red and white fruit).
- 6 mai kanpuka white water lily. (Note: its auwa ia at Potjauwa)
- 7 (a)min kanmula (male cuscus; (b)min pokauwan (female cuscus); (c) min woripa (storm bird), (d) mai po'am (white fruit); (e)min monti (jabiru).
- 8.1 min wonna (tree grub).
- 8.2 (a) min mulaiya (white water-snake); (b) mai tallina (edible palm-tree fruit; (c) mai yukata (black fruit).
- 9.1 (a) olarika (male leech); (b) uwa (female leech); (c) ku'a (male dingo); (d)ku'a (female dingo) (Note: the Wiki Mungkan prized their native dogs, endowing some with totemic names. Their totemic centre was Kuauwa, a deep lagoon off the Archer towards the coast;) (e) mai koinkan (edible palm tem); (f) mai epauwa n(small root).
- 9.2 min kuimpi (kangaroo).
- 10 (a)ornya (male ghosts); (b) pantia (female ghosts/'sweethearts'); (Note: The totemic sites, respectively Ornyauwa and Pantiauwa lay in the centre of Wik territory, among lagoons south of the Archer. The ghost totems (pulwaiya) are people who were culture-bearers, having taught things like how to build and cook fish in an ant-bed oven or how to make fish-garths) (c)min nguttham(small bird); (Note: This totem was believed to guard fishing operations, and is located near fish traps in the lagoon area of the ghost totems) (d) min kiwa (small fish).
- 11.1 (a) min kora (native companion); (b) mai po'alam (yellow fruit)
- 11.2 oingorpan (carpet snake) (Note: The clan managing this totem, whose auwa was on the Tokali river, died off, and the care of the site passed to the min kora)

Kendall River

- 12.1 min kuipang (bream)
- 12.2 min akala (cat-fish)
- 13.1 min atjimba (emu) (Note: The auwa is associated with an aetiological story explaining relations between this totem and the native companion totem.)
- 13.2 (a) min ketji (white crane); 8b) mai mayta (small root); (c) mai arika (water-lily); (d) yoinka manka (ironwood flower).
- 13.3 min wainkan (curlew)
- 13.4 min kerki (chicken hawk) (Note: "Chicken Hawk" is a name variously applied to a great many diurnal raptors, if not all of them at some stage or another, but most commonly to the Brown Goshawk and the Collared Sparrowhawk)
- 14.1 (a) min kulan(male opossum); min wutjiga (female opossum)
- 14.2 min pola (black snake).
- 15 mai kampa and pontamanka (bloodwood and messmate flowers)
- 16 min nompi (eaglehawk)
- 17 (a) patja (shooting star/meteor); (Note: This indicated the death of a relative) (b) min tjipin (quail).
- 18 (a) min wata (crow); (b) nantiaka (praying mantis); min tatji (large iguana). (Note: McConnel makes an error, in failing to specify if this totem belongs to the Kendall river group or the following Holroyd river group. It is wedged without comment between the two)

Holroyd River

- 19 mai manyi (small sweet water lily).
- 20 mai kuntjan (pandanus).
- 21 (a)mia yungatang (native cat); (b) min wala (blue-tongued lizard). (Note: This is the only species to which the Wik-Mungkan raise an artificial stone auwa, something more typical of the neighbouring Kaantju, though the Wik-Mungkan do associate the auwa of the quoll or native cat with a natural spill of stones.)
- 22.1 min panta (small iguana).
- 22.2 min yuwam (snake)
- 22.3 min umpara (freshwater stingray?).
- 22.4 min anka (sardine fish)
- 23 min manki (bandicoot).

Edward River

- 24 min kena (freshwater crocodile).
- 25 mai atta (honey).

== Ethnographic studies ==
The Australian aboriginal evidence for kinship has attracted particular attention from anthropology, and within this area, the material gathered on the Wik-Mungkan has played a notable role. The first ethnographic study of the Wik people had been done by the British anthropologist Ursula McConnel starting in 1927. Her fieldwork focused on groups gathered into the Archer River Mission at what is now known as Aurukun. Shortly afterwards, they attracted the attention of Donald Thomson in 1932-3. McConnel's analysis drew the attention of Claude Lévi-Strauss in his seminal postwar study, The Elementary Structures of Kinship, premised on the idea that "primitive" peoples like the aborigines exhibited mathematical precision in their social taxonomies, and which introduced a structural formalist approach to anthropology, and this was in turn developed by Rodney Needham who attempted a total structural analysis whose results, though based on McConnel's articles, advanced a theory totally at variance with hers. Needham's paper was fortunate in that it appeared at a time when direct and nearly immediate field verification of his hypothesis could be undertaken. The British anthropologist David McKnight began to carry out fieldwork with the Wik-Mungkan shortly afterwards.

== Notes ==
=== Sources cited ===
- Berger, Harry (2005). Situated Utterances: Texts, Bodies, and Cultural Representations. Fordham University Press. ISBN 978-0-823-22429-6.
- Jackes, Mary (1969). "Wikmunkan Joking Relationships". Mankind. 7 (2): 128–31. doi:10.1111/j.1835-9310.1969.tb00396.x.
- Johnson, Steve (1991). "Social parameters of linguistic change in an unstratified Aboriginal society". In Baldi, Philip (ed.). Patterns of Change - Change of Patterns: Linguistic Change and Reconstruction Methodology. Walter de Gruyter. pp. 203–218. ISBN 978-3-110-87189-0.
- Lévi-Strauss, Claude (1969). The Elementary Structures of Kinship. Beacon Press.
- McConnel, Ursula (April 1930a). "The Wik-Munkan Tribe of Cape York Peninsula". Oceania. 1 (1): 97–104. doi:10.1002/j.1834-4461.1930.tb00005.x. JSTOR 40373036.
- McConnel, Ursula (July 1930b). "The Wik-Munkan Tribe. Part II. Totemism". Oceania. 1 (2): 181–205. doi:10.1002/j.1834-4461.1930.tb01644.x. JSTOR 40327320.
- McConnel, Ursula (March 1934). "The Wik-Munkan and Allied Tribes of Cape York Peninsula, N.Q.". Oceania. 4 (3): 310–367. doi:10.1002/j.1834-4461.1934.tb00113.x. JSTOR 40327784.
- McKnight, David (1981). "The Wik-Mungkan concept Nganwi: A Study of Mystical Power and sickness in an Australian tribe". Bijdragen tot de Taal-, Land- en Volkenkunde, ANTHROPOLOGICA XXIII. 137 (1): 90–105. doi:10.1163/22134379-90003510. JSTOR 27863347.
- McKnight, David (2004). "Some problems concerning the Wik-mungkan". In Needham, Rodney (ed.). Rethinking Kinship and Marriage. Psychology Press. pp. 145–180. ISBN 978-0-415-33013-8.
- Needham, Rodney (2004). "Introduction". Rethinking Kinship and Marriage. Psychology Press. ISBN 978-0-415-33013-8.
- Overing, Joanna; Lanoue, Guy; Creider, Chet (22 July 2006). "David McKnight: Empathetic ethnographer of the Australian aborigines". The Independent.
- Robinson, Olivia; Barnard, Trish (2010). "'Thanks, but we'll take it from here': Australian Aboriginal and Torres Strait Islander Women Influencing the Collection of Tangible and Intangible Heritage.". In Levin, Amy K. (ed.). Gender, Sexuality and Museums: A Routledge Reader. Routledge. pp. 129–137. ISBN 978-1-136-94364-5.
- Sutton, Peter (1991). "Language in Aboriginal Australia: Social dialects in a geographic idiom". In Romaine, Suzanne (ed.). Language in Australia. Cambridge University Press. pp. 49–66. ISBN 978-0-521-33983-4.
