= Wiknatanja =

Aboriginal Australian people of Cape York, Queensland

The Wiknatanja, also spelt Wik Ngathanya, are an Aboriginal Australian people, one of the Wik peoples of the Cape York Peninsula of northern Queensland.

== Languages ==
Wiknatanja was one of the Wik languages.

== Country ==
Norman Tindale estimated Wiknatanja lands to encompass some 300 square miles (780 km^{2}) on the coast around mouths of the Kendall River.

== Alternative names ==
Alternative names and spellings, according to Tindale, included:

- Wik-Ngartona
- Wik-Natan
- Wik-ngatona
