= Mimungkum =

Aboriginal Australian people

The Mimungkum were an Aboriginal Australian people of Cape York Peninsula in northern Queensland.

== Language ==
The Mimungkum spoke a dialect of Wik Mungkan.

== Country ==
The Mimungkum were a small tribe restricted to an estimated 80 square miles (210 km^{2}) of territory 12 miles inland and south of Cape Keerweer in the Gulf of Carpentaria and on the Kendall River.

== People ==
The Mimungkum are one of the Wik peoples, but the Wik form of their ethnonym was not recorded, unless it is this tribe that is referred to in a reference to a tribe called the Wikmumin in this area.

== Sources ==
- Tindale, Norman Barnett (1974). "Mimungkum (QLD)". Aboriginal Tribes of Australia: Their Terrain, Environmental Controls, Distribution, Limits, and Proper Names. Australian National University. ISBN 978-0-708-10741-6.
