= Ayapathu =

Indigenous Australian people

The Ayapathu people, otherwise known as the Ayabadhu or Aiyaboto, were an Indigenous Australian group, living on the western side of the Cape York Peninsula in northern Queensland.

== Language ==
Ayapathu language appears to have been closely related to the coastal language of Yintyingka, though structurally different and they may be considered dialects of the same language. Etymologically, aya means 'language', while patha may be cognate with the homophonous Yintyingka word for 'to eat', paralleling the ethnonym Wik-Mungkan (speech (wik)+eat (mungka).

Little is otherwise known of the language. Some word lists were compiled from information given by George Rocky, whose vernacular was Umpila, though his father was an Ayapathu. He was raised from boyhood at the Lockhart River Mission, and then worked on Japanese lugger boats fishing for beche-de-mer and pearls. The Japanese generally treated their aboriginal hired labourers better than white employers did. The last informants on the language had generally grown up with a neighbouring tribe's culture, and Ayapathu was no longer their first language. Thus just as George Rocky primarily spoke Umpila Jack Shephard, whose mother was an Ayapathu, was himself a Kaantju clansman. The last speakers died out in the late 20th century.

== Country ==
According to Norman Tindale, Ayapathu tribal lands extended over some 1,900 sq. miles, stretching from north of Ebagoola, to Musgrave in the south. Their western boundaries were formed by the headwaters of the Coleman and Holroyd rivers. To the east, they reached the Great Dividing Range and Violet Vale.

== History ==
The Ayapathu were an inland tribe (Note: The word 'tribe' is used with caution. It implied that the Ayapathu were more properly defined as those clans speaking the Ayapathu language, and not 'corporate social groups'.) closely related to the coastal Yintyingka people. The first mention of them in settlement records comes from 19th century police reports, in particular those of William Parry-Okeden and sergeant George Smith of the Musgrave Mounted Native Police in 1897, both connected with complaints by pastoralists laid against the aborigines whose land they were occupying. Donald Thomson and Ursula McConnel studied the tribes of the region intensely, the latter from 1927 to 1934, nonetheless she provided little information on them other than noting that their hunting grounds were on the upper Holroyd River, that they intermarried with the Kaantju, and held corroborees with that tribe and the Wik-Mungkan at the junction where the Hoyroyd meets the Pretender river. The Wik-Mungkan tribe lay to their west, the Kaantju to their north, and the Koko Taiyari southwest. Otherwise they (called Aiyaboto), reduced by pastoral expansion over their lands, gathered for hand-outs on the river bed outside Coen. The profound disruption to the Ayapathu caused by colonial expropriations devastated the integrity of their tribal world, and they were dispersed into remnants, with a profound loss of their original tribal identity. In recent years, through ethnographic reconstruction, close study of folk memories and land claims, the Ayapathu descendants have begun to reclaim part of their heritage.

== Society ==
The Ayapathu like other tribes in the area were land-holding exogamous estate-holding clans, typified by patrilineal recruitment. The actual land-use was determined by hordes, whose members were generally affiliated to the tribes holding these estates. The kinship terminology of the Ayapathu was essentially identical to that among the Yintyingka.

== Alternative names ==
This is a list of the different names used in the historical ethnographic literature to refer to the Ayapathu:

- Aiabadu
- Aiyaboto
- Jabuda
- Koka Ai-ebadu
- Aiebadu (with glottal stop)
- Koko Aiebadu
- Kikahiabilo
