= Koowarta v Bjelke-Petersen =

Judgement of the High Court of Australia

- Court: High Court of Australia
- Full case name: Koowarta v Bjelke-Petersen & Ors; Queensland v Commonwealth
- Decided: 11 May 1982
- Citations: [1982] HCA 27, (1982) 153 CLR 168

Case history
- Subsequent action: Koowarta v Bjelke-Petersen (1988) 92 FLR 104

Court membership
- Judges sitting: Gibbs CJ, Stephen, Mason, Murphy, Aickin, Wilson & Brennan JJ

Case opinions
- (5:1) the Racial Discrimination Act 1975 was not valid under s 51 (xxvi) of the Constitution, since they applied to all races, and not to one particular race (per Gibbs CJ, Stephen, Aickin, Wilson & Brennan JJ; Mason J not deciding) (4:3) the Act was however valid under s 51 (xxix) of the Constitution, since implementing a treaty is a valid exercise of the 'external affairs' power (per Stephen, Mason, Murphy & Brennan JJ)

Koowarta v Bjelke-Petersen, was a significant court case decided in the High Court of Australia on 11 May 1982. It concerned the constitutional validity of parts of the Racial Discrimination Act 1975, and the discriminatory acts of the Government of Queensland in blocking the purchase of land by Aboriginal people in northern Queensland.

== Background to the case ==
John Koowarta, the plaintiff, was an Aboriginal Australian man, a member of the Wik nation. The Wik peoples were the Indigenous inhabitants of the Aurukun region of the Cape York Peninsula. In 1974, Koowarta and a number of other stockmen planned to purchase the Archer River cattle station, which covered much of the Wik peoples' traditional homeland, using funds provided by the Aboriginal Land Fund Commission. They approached Remington Rand, an American businessman who owned the station by way of a pastoral lease, who agreed to sell the lease to them. In February 1976, the Commission made a contract to purchase the property, but before the sale could be completed, it was blocked by the Government of Queensland.

Joh Bjelke-Petersen, the Premier of Queensland at the time, did not approve of the sale, because he did not believe that Aboriginal people should be able to acquire large areas of land, a view which was reflected in official cabinet policy. As such, he had directed the Queensland Minister of Lands not to approve the sale. Koowarta initially made a complaint to the Human Rights and Equal Opportunity Commission, on the basis that blocking the sale was discriminatory. The Commission upheld Koowarta's complaint, but the Queensland Government appealed to the Supreme Court of Queensland. The Queensland Government also brought a separate action against the Government of Australia, arguing that they had no power to pass the Racial Discrimination Act, and as such, the case was moved to the High Court.

== Arguments ==
Koowarta presented a case to the Human Rights Commission opposing the policy enacted by the Queensland Government, to block Aboriginal acquisition of large areas of land, arguing that it was discriminatory under sections 9 and 12 of the Racial Discrimination Act 1975. Section 9 makes it unlawful for any person to make a distinction based on race which interferes with another person's human rights. Section 12 makes it unlawful for any person to refuse to sell land to another person, or refuse to allow them to occupy the land, based on their race.

Bjelke-Petersen, on behalf of the Queensland Government, argued that the Racial Discrimination Act was not valid, and that the Australian Government had no power to make it. Section 51 of the Australian Constitution defines the powers of the Australian Government, and Bjelke-Petersen argued that subsection xxvi of that section, which allows the Parliament of Australia to make laws for "the people of any race, for whom it is deemed necessary to make special laws," did not apply to the Act, since it prohibited discrimination against people of all races.

=== The 'race' power ===
The most important question in the case was whether the Racial Discrimination Act was valid. Section 51(xxvi) of the Australian Constitution, which allows the Commonwealth to make laws for the people of any race, originally made a specific exclusion for Aboriginal people. However, this exception was removed in the 1967 referendum on Aboriginal people, and since then, the Commonwealth had power to make laws for Aboriginal people. However, the wording did not mean that only laws benefiting people of any race could be passed; in fact, the section was originally designed to allow the Commonwealth to discriminate against the people of any race. Nevertheless, the court agreed that the Commonwealth could make laws prohibiting discrimination against the people of any race.

However, the court found that the Act addressed racial discrimination against all people, not just the people of one particular race. As such, the Act had no basis in the 'any race' power.

=== External affairs power ===
The court agreed that the Racial Discrimination Act was intended to give effect within Australia to the United Nations Convention on the Elimination of All Forms of Racial Discrimination (CERD), which Australia had signed on 13 October 1966. Section 51(xxix) of the Australian Constitution, which simply states that the Parliament has power to make laws with respect to "external affairs" (a term which is left undefined), was put forward as an alternative source of authority for the Act. The Commonwealth in a submission argued that since the Act gave effect to Australia's international obligations as a signatory to the CERD, it came under the external affairs power.

An important question was whether the Act could truly be regarded as an "external affair", since it applied entirely within Australia. There had already been a number of High Court cases which approved the use of the external affairs power to implement international treaties (such as the Paris Convention case and the Seas and Submerged Lands case). The court recognised that the external affairs power was not restricted only to matters outside of Australia, but it was still questionable whether it applied to matters that did not involve foreigners or other countries at all. The Commonwealth argued that it would affect Australia's international reputation if it were not able to carry out its obligations as a signatory to the Convention.

== Judgment ==
This cartoon drawn by Alan Moir, first published on 13 May 1982 in Brisbane's The Courier-Mail, is typical of the public reaction to the High Court's decision.

By a majority of six to one, the court found that the Racial Discrimination Act was not valid under the "race" power. However, by a narrow majority of four to three, the court also found that the Act was within the "external affairs" power.

Three judges (Gibbs, Aickin, and Wilson) adopted a very narrow view, endorsing a test proposed by Dixon, J in R v Burgess; ex parte Henry, which focuses on whether a treaty is "indisputably international". They also suggested that reading the external affairs power too widely would destroy the balance of powers between the Commonwealth and the States. They felt that the external affairs power had to be read in light of federalism in the Constitution. In effect, they proposed that any treaty had to meet an additional test and be 'indisputably international in character'. Their view was therefore concerned with the subject matter of racial discrimination. In this case, the legislation was not sufficient to satisfy their test, and they held that the legislation was not valid.

Three other judges (Mason, Murphy, Brennan) took a wide view, saying that the mere existence of a treaty obligation was sufficient to render the matter an 'external affair', regardless of the particular subject in question. This view was therefore not concerned with the international character of racial discrimination, but with the activity of treaty-making. Justice Murphy characterised the arguments advanced by the states as an attempt to resurrect the reserved state powers doctrine rejected in the 1920 Engineers' Case, and said that without the ability to implement treaties, Australia would be an "international cripple". Here, Australia clearly had obligations under the treaty, and as such the legislation was valid.

The deciding opinion was that of Ninian Stephen, who ultimately agreed with Mason, Murphy and Brennan on the facts, but took a somewhat narrow middle path in order to arrive at the same conclusion. He adopted a test based on whether or not the subject matter of the treaty being implemented is of 'international concern'. This test was not as broad as the wide view, and not as restrictive as the 'indisputably international' test. On the facts, Stephen found that the prevention of racial discrimination was indeed a matter of international concern, and as such the Racial Discrimination Act was valid.

In total, four judges held the legislation was valid under the external affairs power, but there was not a majority of judges agreeing on the test for determining validity. As a result, there was no clear ratio decidendi in the case; at best, a majority of the court might hold that s51(xxix) would support legislation implementing treaties with subject-matter of 'international concern'.

== Consequences ==
The case upheld the validity of the Racial Discrimination Act, and endorsed the Australian Government's use of the "external affairs" power to implement treaties not directly relating to other countries, an interpretation that would later become important in cases such as the Tasmanian Dam case, where a majority of four judges would adopt the reasoning favoured by Mason, Murphy and Brennan in this case. In another later case, the Industrial Relations Act case, a majority of five judges endorsed the same reasoning, thus cementing its place in Australian law.

The main part of the case, relating to the Queensland Government's action in blocking Koowarta's purchase of the lease, was remitted to the Supreme Court of Queensland. The decision there was eventually made in 1988, in favour of Koowarta. The sale was to proceed, but at the last minute, Bjelke-Petersen, in an act described by Australian Conservation Foundation councillor Kevin Guy as one of "spite and prejudice," declared the Archer River property a national park, the Archer Bend National Park (now known as Oyala Thumotang National Park), to ensure that no one could ever own it. However, on 6 October 2010 Premier Anna Bligh announced that a 75,000-hectare (750 km^{2}) portion of the park would be given over to the Wik-Mungkana peoples as freehold land.

== See also ==
- Australian constitutional law
- List of Australian Native Title court cases
