= Pickaninny (disambiguation) =

Pickaninny, also spelled picaninny, piccaninnie, piccaninny, and pickaninnie, is a derogatory term for a black child. It may also refer to:

- Piccaninny crater, impact structure in Western Australia
- Pickaninny Buttes, summit in California
- Piccaninny tribe, fictional Native American tribe in the children's novel Peter and Wendy
- Pickaninny, a type of chess problem

== See also ==
- Piccaninny Plains Sanctuary, nature reserve in Queensland, Australia
- Piccaninnie Ponds Conservation Park, South Australia
