= Bill Gammage =

20th and 21st-century Australian historian

Bill Gammage AM FASSA
- Born: William Leonard Gammage; 1942 (age 83–84); Orange, New South Wales
- Awards: Manning Clark Bicentennial History Award (1988); Fellow of the Academy of the Social Sciences in Australia (1995); Queensland Premier's History Book Award (1999); Member of the Order of Australia (2005); Manning Clark House National Cultural Award (2011); Prime Minister's Prize for Australian History (2012); Victorian Premier's Prize for Nonfiction (2012); Queensland Literary Awards History Book Award (2012)

Academic background
- Education: Australian National University
- Thesis: The Broken Years: A Study of the Diaries and Letters of Australian Soldiers in the Great War, 1914–18 (1970)
- Doctoral advisor: Bruce Kent
- Influences: Charles Bean

Academic work
- Institutions: Australian National University (1997–03); University of Adelaide (1977–96); University of Papua New Guinea (1972–76)
- Main interests: Australian history
- Notable works: The Broken Years (1974); The Biggest Estate on Earth (2011)

William Leonard Gammage AM FASSA (born 1942) is an Australian academic historian, adjunct professor and senior research fellow at the Humanities Research Centre of the Australian National University (ANU). Gammage was born in Orange, New South Wales, went to Wagga Wagga High School and then to ANU. He was on the faculty of the University of Papua New Guinea and the University of Adelaide. He is a fellow of the Australian Academy of Social Sciences and deputy chair of the National Museum of Australia.

== History studies ==
=== World War I ===
Gammage is best known for his book The Broken Years: Australian Soldiers in the Great War, which is based on his PhD thesis written while at the Australian National University. It was first published in 1974, and re-printed in 1975, 1980, 1981 (the year in which Peter Weir's film, Gallipoli came out), 1985 and 1990. The study revives the tradition of C. E. W. Bean, Australia's official historian of World War I, who focused his narrative on the men in the line rather than the strategies of generals. Gammage corresponded with 272 Great War veterans, and consulted the personal records of another 728, mostly at the Australian War Memorial.

Gammage has written several other books about the experiences of soldiers in World War I, including three definitive books about Australian soldiers in the war. He also co-edited the Australians 1938 volume of the Bicentennial History of Australia (1988).

=== Aboriginal peoples' planning and management of Australia ===
In 1998, Gammage joined the Humanities Research Centre at the ANU as a senior research fellow for the Australian Research Council, working on the history of Aboriginal land management. His scope was cross-disciplinary, working "across fields as disparate as history, anthropology and botany".

In the subsequent 13-year period Gammage researched and wrote the book The Biggest Estate on Earth: How Aborigines made Australia, released in October 2011. It won the 2012 Prime Minister's Prize for Australian History in the Prime Minister's Literary Awards, the 2011 Manning Clark House National Cultural Awards in the individual category, was shortlisted for the 2012 Kay Daniels Award, the History Book Award of the 2012 Queensland Literary Awards and awarded the 2012 Victorian Premier's Literary Awards overall Victorian Prize for Literature on top of the non-fiction category prize.

=== Gallipoli ===
As a historical adviser, Gammage has worked on many documentaries and his writing is cited as an authoritative source on Australia's participation in World War I. For the film Gallipoli directed by Peter Weir, Gammage was employed as the military advisor and he worked on the text that David Williamson turned into the screen play of the film.

=== Local history of Narrandera ===
Gammage produced a historical study of the Shire of Narrandera. Gammage was made a freeman of Narrandera Shire Council in 1987.

=== Adelaide ANZAC Day commentary ===
Gammage was part of the Australian Broadcasting Commission Adelaide ANZAC Day Commemorative March commentary team until 2015.

== Awards and nominations ==
- 1988 – ABC/ABA Manning Clark Bicentennial History Award, for his book Narrandera Shire
- 1999 – Queensland Premier's Literary Awards, History Book Award for The Sky Travellers: Journeys in New Guinea 1938–39
- 1999 – shortlisted in the New South Wales Premier's History Awards for The Sky Travellers: Journeys in New Guinea 1938–39
- 2005 – Member of the Order of Australia (AM)
- 2010 – presented the inaugural Eric Rolls Memorial Lecture
- 2011 – Manning Clark House National Cultural Award winner for The Biggest Estate on Earth
- 2012 – Prime Minister's Literary Awards, Prize for Australian History for The Biggest Estate on Earth
- 2012 – shortlisted for the Kay Daniels Award
- 2012 – Queensland Literary Awards, History Book Award
- 2012 – Victorian Premier's Literary Awards overall Victorian Prize for Literature on top of the non-fiction category prize
- 2012 – ACT Book of the Year Award

== Influence ==
Bruce Pascoe has acknowledged the work done by Gammage (and also Rupert Gerritsen), which especially influenced his 2014 award-winning book describing early Aboriginal settlements and agriculture, Dark Emu: Black Seeds: Agriculture or Accident?.

== Publications ==
=== Books ===
- The Broken Years: Australian Soldiers in the Great War. Australia: Australian National University Press. 1974. ISBN 978-0-85179-699-4.
- with Harris, David; Cole, Michael; Piggott, Reg (1976). An Australian in the First World War. New York: Cambridge University Press. ISBN 978-0-521-21018-8.
- Man and land: some remarks on European ideas and the Australian environment. Publication no. 64 (booklet). Stirling memorial lecture; (no. 4. Broadcast from Radio 5UV, the University of Adelaide on 13 December 1978). Adelaide, South Australia: Dept. of Continuing Education, University of Adelaide. 1979. ISBN 978-0-85578-017-3.
- with Williamson, David (1981). The Story of Gallipoli. Ringwood, Vic: Penguin Books. ISBN 978-0-14-006105-5.
- with Markus, Andrew (1982). All that dirt: aborigines 1938. Canberra: History Project, Inc., Research School of Social Sciences, Australian National University. ISBN 978-0-949776-08-2.
- Narrandera Shire. Narrandera: Bill Gammage for the Narrandera Shire Council. 1986. OCLC 63179965.
- with Spearritt, Peter (1987). Australians, 1938. New York: Broadway; Fairfax, Syme & Weldon Associates. ISBN 978-0-949288-21-9.
- Headon, David John; Warden, James; Gammage, Bill (1994). Crown or country: the traditions of Australian republicanism. St. Leonards, NSW: Allen & Unwin. ISBN 978-1-86373-599-5.
- The Sky Travellers: Journeys in New Guinea 1938–1939. Melbourne: Melbourne University. 1998. ISBN 978-0-522-84827-4.
- Australia under Aboriginal management (booklet). Barry Andrews memorial lecture. Vol. 15. Canberra, ACT: School of Humanities and Social Sciences, University College, University of New South Wales, Australian Defence Force Academy – "in association with the Barry Andrews Memorial Trust and the National Library of Australia". 2003. ISBN 978-0-73170-388-3.
- Gammage, Bill; Ebooks Corporation (2011), The Biggest Estate on Earth: How Aborigines Made Australia, Allen & Unwin, ISBN 978-1-74237-748-3

=== Journal articles ===
- "The Rabaul strike, 1929∗". The Journal of Pacific History. 10 (3): 3–29. 1975. doi:10.1080/00223347508572276. ISSN 0022-3344.
- "Early boundaries of New South Wales". Historical Studies. 19 (77): 524–531. 1981. doi:10.1080/10314618108595657. ISSN 0018-2559.
- "My Country of the Pelican Dreaming [Book Review]". Aboriginal History. 7: 195. 1983.
- "Historical reconsiderations VIII: Who gained, and who was meant to gain, from land selection in New South Wales?". Australian Historical Studies. 24 (94): 104–122. 1990. doi:10.1080/10314619008595834. ISSN 1031-461X.
- "Open and closed historiographies". Australian Historical Studies. 24 (96): 443–446. 1991. doi:10.1080/10314619108595859. ISSN 1031-461X.
- (1991) ANZAC's influence on Turkey and Australia. Journal of the Australian War Memorial 18; Presented as a keynote address at the 1990 Australian War Memorial history conference
- "Police and power in the pre-war Papua New Guinea highlands". The Journal of Pacific History. 31 (2): 162–177. 1996. doi:10.1080/00223349608572816. ISSN 0022-3344.
- "John Black's 'Anatomy of a hanging: Malignant homicidal sorcery in the upper Markham valley, New Guinea. An exploratory enquiry'". The Journal of Pacific History. 33 (2): 225–234. 1998. doi:10.1080/00223349808572872. ISSN 0022-3344.
- "My Gun, My Brother. the World of the Papua New Guinea Colonial Police 1920–1960 [Book Review]", Oceania, 70 (2): 193–, December 1999, doi:10.1002/j.1834-4461.1999.tb03011.x, ISSN 0029-8077
- "'…far more happier than we Europeans': Aborigines and farmers" (PDF). London Papers in Australian Studies (12): 1–27. 2005. ISSN 1746-1774. OCLC: 137333394. Archived from the original (PDF) on 1 February 2014.
- "Desert Gardens: Waterless lands and the problems of adaptation, National Library of Australia, Canberra, 29, 30, and 31 March 2005 – Gardens without fences? Landscape in Aboriginal Australia". Australian Humanities Review: Ecological Humanities (Section). 36. July 2005. ISSN 1325-8338. Archived from the original on 2 March 2012.
- "Sorcery in New Guinea, 1938 and 1988∗". The Journal of Pacific History. 41 (1): 87–96. 2006. doi:10.1080/00223340600652458. hdl:1885/20296. ISSN 0022-3344. S2CID 161113814.
- "The Anzac cemetery". Australian Historical Studies. 38 (129): 124–140. 2007. doi:10.1080/10314610708601235. ISSN 1031-461X. S2CID 144412295.
- "Plain facts: Tasmania under Aboriginal management". Landscape Research. 33 (2): 241–254. 2008. Bibcode:2008LandR..33..241G. doi:10.1080/01426390701767278. ISSN 0142-6397. S2CID 146510410.
- "Galahs". Australian Historical Studies. 40 (3): 275–293. 2009. doi:10.1080/10314610903067094. hdl:1885/47799. ISSN 1031-461X. S2CID 218621733.
- "Fire in 1788: The Closest Ally". Australian Historical Studies. 42 (2): 277–288. June 2011. doi:10.1080/1031461X.2011.566273. ISSN 1031-461X. S2CID 143771836.
- "Victorian landscapes in 1788". Studies in the History of Gardens & Designed Landscapes. 31 (2): 83–87. June 2011. doi:10.1080/14601176.2011.556367. ISSN 1460-1176. S2CID 161322694.
- "Aboriginal Dreaming paths and trading routes: the colonisation of the Australian economic landscape – By Dale Kerwin [Book Review]". The Economic History Review. 64 (4): 1419–1420. October 2011. doi:10.1111/j.1468-0289.2011.00611_29.x. hdl:10.1111/j.1468-0289.2011.00611_29.x. ISSN 1468-0289.
- "Gavamani: the Magisterial Service of British New Guinea. By James Sinclair [Book Review]". The Journal of Pacific History. 47 (1): 141–142. 2012. doi:10.1080/00223344.2012.649900. ISSN 0022-3344. S2CID 161902532.

=== Book chapters ===
- – "Oral and Written Sources." In Oral Tradition in Melanesia. Ed. by Donald Denoon, Roderic Lacey. Port Moresby, New Guinea: University of Papua, New Guinea and Institute of Papua New Guinea Studies. pp. 115–24.
- — (1994). "Sustainable damage: the environment and the future". In Dovers, Stephen (ed.). Australian Environmental History: Essays and Cases. Melbourne; New York: Oxford University Press. pp. 258–267. ISBN 978-0195534825.
  - Australian environmental history: essays and cases / edited by Stephen Dovers (Catalogue record). Oxford University Press. 1994. ISBN 978-0-19-553482-5.
- — (2006). "Landscapes transformed". In Lake, Marilyn (ed.). Memory, Monuments and Museums: The Past in the Present. Carlton, Vic.: Melbourne University Press in association with the Australian Academy of the Humanities. pp. 153–165, 270–273. ISBN 9780522852509.
  - Memory, monuments and museums: the past in the present / edited by Marilyn Lake (Catalogue record). Melbourne University Press in association with the Australian Academy of the Humanities. 2006. ISBN 9780522852509. OCLC 68208605.

=== Other work ===
- "Sir John Monash : a military review" (Melbourne University, 1974)
- "The story of Gallipoli" / text by Bill Gammage; screenplay by David Williamson; preface by Peter Weir. Ringwood, Vic. : Penguin Australia 1981) Released August 1981 as "Gallipoli.", dir. by Peter Weir
- "The Achievement of the Australian Aborigines", The Australian and New Zealand Studies Project (Text of an Australian and New Zealand Studies Occasional Lecture given at the University of Hawaii at Manoa on Wednesday, 9 December 1992), Occasional paper no.1, Manoa, Honolulu: School of Hawaiian, Asian and Pacific Studies, University of Hawaii, 1992, p. 9
