= Wik Elken =

Aboriginal Australian people of the Cape York Peninsula, northern Queensland

The Wik Elken, also spelt Wik-Kalkan and also known as Wik-Ngatharr, are an Aboriginal Australian people, one of the Wik peoples of the Cape York Peninsula of the state of Queensland.

== Language ==
The Wik-Kalkan language belonged to the Wik language group.

== Country ==
The Wik-Kalkan lay north of the Wikepa, along the coast north of Cape Keerweer, and, according to Norman Tindale, once had tribal lands of approximately 300 square miles (780 km^{2}) in extent.

== People ==
The Wik-Kalkan has been described under the name of "Wikngatara" by Ursula McConnel in various papers. This term actually was a language name, rather than an ethnonym, and signified "my language". McConnel realised her error shortly before her death, and notified Tindale of the oversight.

== Alternative names ==
Alternative names and spellings identified by Tindale include:

- Wik-ngatara (erroneous term)
- Wik Alkän
- Wikkalkin
- Wik-nätara
- Algan
- Ngadara
