= Geraldine MacKenzie =

Australian missionary and educator

Geraldine Adelaide Propsting MacKenzie (née Storrs, 1900–1980) was an Australian missionary and educator. She was born in Prahran, Victoria, and studied at Melbourne Church of England Grammar School and the University of Melbourne. In 1925, she married William MacKenzie, who had been appointed superintendent of Aurukun Presbyterian mission.

Geraldine MacKenzie spent her time at the mission nursing the sick and teaching at the mission school. The Governor of Queensland, Sir Henry Abel Smith, said that the MacKenzies "by their example of joyous service, generate and radiate happiness to all around them. Their aim has not been to destroy the tribal customs, but to preserve all that is good in them."
