= Wik Ompom language =

Extinct Australian Aboriginal language

Wik Ompom
- Native to: Australia
- Region: Cape York Peninsula, Queensland
- Ethnicity: Wik Ompom
- Extinct: (date missing)
- Language family: Pama–Nyungan: Paman; North Cape York; Wik?; Wik Ompom

Language codes
- ISO 639-3: None (mis)
- Glottolog: None
- AIATSIS: Y48

Wik Ompom (Ambama) is an extinct Paman language of the Cape York Peninsula of Queensland, Australia. Its name suggests it is one of the Wik languages, but typologically it is distinct.
