= Wik-Ngathan language =

Australian Aboriginal language

Wik-Ngathan
- Wik-Iinjtjenj
- Native to: Australia
- Region: Cape York Peninsula, Queensland
- Ethnicity: Wiknatanja, Wik-Kalkan
- Native speakers: 3 (2016 census)
- Language family: Pama–Nyungan: Paman; North Cape York; Wik; Wik-Ngathan
- Dialects: Wik-Ngathan; Wik-Ngatharr (Wik-Alken)

Language codes
- ISO 639-3: Either: wig – Wik Ngathan wik – Wikalkan
- Glottolog: wikn1245 Wik-Ngathana
- AIATSIS: Y54 Wik Ngathan, Y51 Wik Ngatharr
- ELP: Wik-Ngathana
- Wik-Ngathan is classified as Definitely Endangered by the UNESCO Atlas of the World's Languages in Danger.
- Coordinates: 13°52′S 141°31′E

Wik-Ngathan, or Wik-Iinjtjenj (Wik-Iinychanya), is a Paman language spoken on the Cape York Peninsula of Queensland, Australia, by the Wik-Ngathan people. It is closely related to the other Wik-Ngathan language, Wik-Ngatharr and more distantly to the other Wik languages. In 1981 there were 130 speakers.

A dictionary of Wik-Ngathan has been compiled by Peter Sutton.

== Phonology ==
=== Consonants ===
	Peripheral		Laminal		Apical	Glottal
	Labial	Velar	Dental	Palatal	Alveolar	Glottal
Plosive	p	k	t̪	c	t	ʔ
Nasal	m	ŋ	n̪	ɲ	n	
Lateral					l	
Tap/Trill					ɾ ~ r	
Approximant	w			j	ɹ	

- Sounds /m, n̪, n, ŋ, l/ are heard as syllabic [m̩, n̩, n̪̩, ŋ̍, l̩] when following consonants. A schwa [ə] may also be heard between as well, and may be heard as [ʊ] within the context of bilabials and as [ɪ] within the context of palatal consonants.
- /j/ can also be heard as [ɟ] when under extreme emphasis.
- Nasals may also be pre-stopped when under extreme emphasis.
- /l, n/ may be heard as pre-ploded-syllabic [ᵈl̩, ᵈn̩], when following consonants.

=== Vowels ===
	Front		Central	Back
High	i iː	y yː		u uː
Mid	e eː	y yː		o oː
Low			a aː	

- The high-fronted vowel sounds /y, yː/, may vary in position to [œ, œː].
