= Wik Epa =

Aboriginal Australian people

The Wik Epa, also spelt Wikepa, are an Aboriginal Australian people, one of the Wik peoples of the Cape York Peninsula of northern Queensland.

== Languages ==
Wikepa was were used by an older generation of Cape Keerweer people to denote the dialect employed by two clans in the area of the middle Kirke River, and bore the strongest similarities to those spoken by the Wikmean clan.

== Country ==
The Wikepa were a small group associated with the land, estimated at by 300 square miles (780 km^{2}), around Cape Keerweer.

== People ==
The Wikepa were close to extinction by the post-war period, with only a small number known to be dwelling at an Aurukun mission in 1958.

== Alternative names ==
- Wik-Eppa
- Wik-Iita
