= David McKnight =

Canadian-British social anthropologist and ethnographer

- Born: March 4, 1935; Saint John, New Brunswick
- Died: May 14, 2006 (aged 71); Rome
- Education: M.A. in Anthropology, University College London (1965); Ph.D. in Anthropology, London University (1977)
- Occupation: Anthropologist
- Years active: 1965–1997
- Known for: Anthropology of indigenous Australians

David McKnight (4 March 1935 – 14 May 2006) was a Canadian-British anthropologist and ethnographer who specialized in the anthropology of Australian Aboriginal people, with particular regard to the tribes of the Cape York Peninsula. He conducted over 20 field trips among Aboriginal people in Australia from 1965 to 1999.

== Life ==
McKnight was born in Saint John, New Brunswick in 1935. He completed his B.A. in both English Lit and Philosophy Bishop's University in Quebec in 1957. He went on to study in Great Britain, University College London, obtaining his M.A. degree in anthropology in 1965 on African death cults. He then shifted his research focus to Australian Aboriginal studies, beginning with a first foray into field research in Queensland in 1965.

He was hired at Edinburgh University as a lecturer in Social Anthropology three years later, and then moved to teach the same topic at The London School of Economics. In 1977 he earned his doctorate from London University with a thesis on the intricate marriage systems among the Aboriginal Australian peoples on Mornington Island. He was appointed Senior Lecturer in 1982 and held that post until his retirement in 1997.

On Mornington Island he studied in particular depth the Lardil, the Kaiadilt and the Yangkaal, while at Aurukun he became an authority on the Wik-Mungkan people. His approach clarified that the Australian Aboriginal kinship classification systems were not a code restricted to clan marriage alliances but informed a total cosmology, even if contradictions existed from sub-system to sub-system, which caused dissonances in obligations that infra-tribal arguments had to iron out. He mastered the ceremonial language of the Lardil people, the all but extinct Damin, of which he became the last living speaker, and was given the tribal name of Boorarungee- (the man who asks why). Despite his clear-eyed and frank insights into the abuses that were rife in many Indigenous Australian communities from alcohol and other causes, local respect for him was such that Lardil elders asked him to teach Damin to their children.

Long interested in Italy, he settled in Rome on his retirement, and, on the dissolution of his first marriage to Margret (Meg) Phillips, by whom he had six children, he later married Alessandra Solivetti.

== Major books ==
- (1995) Lardil: Keepers of the Dreamtime, Chronicle Books, San Francisco 978-0-811-80834-7
- (1999) People, Countries, and the Rainbow Serpent: Systems of Classification Among the Lardil of Mornington Island, Oxford University Press, ISBN 978-0-195-09621-7
- (2002) From Hunting to Drinking: The Devastating Effects of Alcohol on an Australian Aboriginal Community, Psychology Press, ISBN 978-0-415-27150-9
- (2005) Of Marriage, Violence and Sorcery: The Quest for Power in Northern Queensland, Ashgate Publishing, ISBN 978-0-754-64465-1
- (2004) Going the Whiteman's Way: Kinship and Marriage Among Australian Aborigines, Ashgate Publishing, ISBN 978-0-754-64238-1

== Notes and references ==
=== References ===
- Overing, Joanna; Lanoue, Guy; Creider, Chet (22 July 2006). "David McKnight: Empathetic ethnographer of the Australian aborigines". The Independent.
- Sutton, Peter (2007). "The Unwavering Eye: David McKnight's Ethnographic-Historical Legacy". The Australian Journal of Anthropology. 18 (2): 227–230. doi:10.1111/j.1835-9310.2007.tb00091.x.
- Worsley, Peter (28 June 2006). "David McKnight". The Guardian.
