= Ward River =

Ward River may refer to:

In Australia

- Ward River (Central West Queensland)
- Ward River (Far North Queensland)

In Ireland

- Ward River (Ireland), County Meath and Fingal (County Dublin), Ireland

== See also ==
- Wards River, New South Wales, Australia
