= Yintyingka =

Extinct Indigenous Australian people

The Yintyingka, now extinct, were an Indigenous Australian people of central and eastern Cape York Peninsula.

== Language ==
The Yintyingka language belonged to the Middle Paman language branch of the Pama-Nyungan language family, and was closely related to the Ayabadhu language, to the point that they are regarded as dialects of the one language.

== Ecology and society ==
The Yintyingka broke down into two distinct blocks, those clan groups, often referred to as Sandbeach people, with a maritime economy living off coastal estates on the plains and savannahs near or along the eastern shores of the Cape York Peninsula, and inland clans, across the Great Dividing Range, constituted by the Ayapathu, centering around the headwaters of the Lukin and Holroyd rivers, whose economy was based on the hinterland's riverine ecology. To the north of the Yintyingka people were the Umpila people, while to their west, north of the Ayapathu, were the Kaantju tribe. On the coast to their south was the Umpilthamu, and further inland, the Olkola and the Rimanggudinha.

== History ==
The traditional tribal areas of the coast were deeply affected by the rapid development of the beche-de-mer and pearling industries after the 1860s, when men, women and children from the tribe were recruited to work on the luggers that plied the waters offshore. In the 1880s, a gold boom, pastoralist expansion and the arrival of many labourers to build the Cape York Peninsula telegraph line, also contributed to a disintegrating impact. The first pastoralists, the Massey brothers, Glen Harry and Charlie, had repeated clashes with the indigenous estate owners, whom they regarded as pilferers of the cattle stock they had introduced in the region. They and the native troopers recruited to that end, exacted revenge by clearing out districts. The male line of the coastal Yintyingka became extinct by the end of the first half of the 20th century, their territorial rights shifting by descent and succession rights to the Lama Lama people living in Port Stewart.

== Ethnography ==
The earliest anthropologists to take notes down on the Yintyingka were Norman B. Tindale in 1927 and Donald Thomson in 1928 and 1929, the fieldwork notes made by the latter in particular being considered 'the single most important source of material' on the language. The only sound recordings made that supply scholars with audio evidence for language's precise phonology were made by La Mont West, Jr on two occasions, in 1961 and 1965.

== Notes and references ==
=== References ===
- Rigsby, Bruce (1999). "Genealogies, kinship and local group composition: Old Yintjingga (Port Stewart) in the late 1920s" (PDF). In Finlayson, Julie D.; Rigsby, Bruce; Bek, Hilary (eds.). Connections in Native Title: Genealogies, Kinship and Groups. Centre for Aboriginal Economic Policy Research. pp. 107–123. ISBN 0-7315-5100-1. Archived from the original (PDF) on 16 November 2016.
- Verstraete, Jean-Christophe; Rigsby, Bruce (2015). A Grammar and Lexicon of Yintyingka. Walter de Gruyter. ISBN 978-1-614-51900-3.
