= Wik Mungkan language =

Australian Aboriginal language

Wik-Mungkan
- Wik-Mungknh
- Native to: Australia
- Region: Cape York Peninsula, Queensland
- Ethnicity: Wik-Mungkan, Mimungkum
- Native speakers: 952 (2021 census)
- Language family: Pama–Nyungan: Paman; North Cape York; Wik; Wik-Mungkan

Language codes
- ISO 639-3: wim
- Glottolog: wikm1247
- AIATSIS: Y57
- ELP: Wik-Mungkan

Wik-Mungkan, or Wik-Mungknh, is a Paman language spoken on the northern part of Cape York Peninsula of Queensland, Australia, by around 1,000 Wik-Mungkan people, and related peoples including the Wikalkan, Wik-Ngathana, Wikngenchera language groups. Wik Mungkan is healthier than most other languages on the peninsula, and is developing and absorbing other Aboriginal languages very quickly.

Dixon thought there was a Wik-Iiyanh dialect, but it turned out to be the same as the Wik-Iiyanh dialect of Kugu Nganhcara.

The English language has borrowed at least one word from Wik-Mungkan, that for the taipan, a species of venomous snake native to the region.

In 1962, Marie Godfrey and Barbara Sayers of the Summer Institute of Linguistics (SIL) started linguistic and translation work in the Wik-Mungkan language in Aurukun. They began a dictionary file, and added to it over several years. Their work was continued and expanded by other SIL members, namely, Christine Kilham and Ann Eckert and was eventually published by SIL/AAB as the Dictionary and source book of the Wik-Mungkan language. The dictionary has been published online by AuSIL as the Wik Mungkan-English Interactive Dictionary.

== Phonology ==
=== Vowels ===
| | Front | Central | Back |
|---|---|---|---|
| High | i | | u |
| Mid | e | | o |
| Low | | a | |

=== Consonants ===
Where the orthography differs from the IPA representation, the orthography is in brackets.

| | Peripheral | | Laminal | | Apical | Glottal |
| | Labial | Velar | Palatal | Dental | Alveolar | Glottal |
|---|---|---|---|---|---|---|
| Plosive | p | k | c ⟨ch⟩ | t̪ ⟨th⟩ | t | ʔ ⟨'⟩ |
| Nasal | m | ŋ ⟨ng⟩ | ɲ ⟨ny⟩ | n̪ ⟨nh⟩ | n | |
| Lateral | | | | | l | |
| Rhotic | | | | | r | |
| Approximant | w | | j | | ɹ (Note: /ɹ/ does not appear frequently, only in some words. The same symbol for /r/ is used.) | |
