= Wik Paach =

Aboriginal Australian people

The Wik Paach or Wikapatja are an Aboriginal Australian people of the Cape York Peninsula of northern Queensland.

== Language ==
The Wikapatja spoke Wik Paach, which despite the name, is not one of the Wik languages.

== Country ==
The Wikapatja were a small tribe whose territory, estimated by Tindale as not exceeding 100 square miles (260 km^{2}), was limited to the mangroves around the delta of the Archer River.

== People ==
The tribe was deemed to be extinct by the time of Tindale's writing in 1974.
