= Wik-Me'nh language =

Australian Aboriginal language

Wik-Me'nh
- Native to: Australia
- Region: Cape York Peninsula, Queensland
- Ethnicity: Wik Epa, Wik Me'anh
- Native speakers: (130 cited 1981)
- Language family: Pama–Nyungan: Paman; North Cape York; Wik; Wik-Me'nh
- Dialects: Wik-Me'nh; Wik-Ep (Wik-Iit); Wik-Keyenganh ?

Language codes
- ISO 639-3: Variously: wih – Wik-Me’anha wie – Wik-Epa wif – Wik-Keyangan (unattested)
- Glottolog: wikm1246 Wik-Me'anha wike1239 Wik-Epa
- AIATSIS: Y53 Wik Me'anh, Y52 Wik Epa, Y173 Wik-Keyangan
- ELP: Wik-Me'anha
- Wik-Epa
- Wik-Keyangan

Wik-Me'nh is a Paman language of the Cape York Peninsula of Queensland, Australia.
