= William MacKenzie (missionary) =

Australian missionary (1897–1972)

William Frederick MacKenzie CBE (16 February 1897 – 29 June 1972) was a Christian missionary and the Aurukun superintendent from 1923-1965. He served as that mission's Chief Protector for the Aboriginal Protection Board.

MacKenzie was born in Ambrym, New Hebrides (now Vanuatu), where his father, John W. Mackenzie, was a missionary. He served on the Western Front in World War I with the Australian Imperial Force. After the war he studied at Ormond College at the University of Melbourne and was ordained a minister with the Presbyterian Church in 1925. That same year he married Geraldine Storrs.

MacKenzie's tenure saw a strict regime that saw children taken from parents and housed in dormitories, and young adults trained for servile work. His punishments were described as "harsh, unorthodox, and arbitrary - they included the use of banishment, corporal punishment, including flogging and beating, use of his fists, use of the 'electro magnet', binding the mouth to stop verbal abuse and swearing." In 1956, Victor and Isobel Wolmby were exiled from the camp because Victor had fathered a child with another woman. Victor was to become recognised as a leader and Isobel became a source of the group's verbal history.

MacKenzie served as Moderator of the Presbyterian Church of Queensland in 1949-50, and was appointed a Commander of the Order of the British Empire in 1963. The Governor of Queensland, Sir Henry Abel Smith, said that MacKenzie and his wife "by their example of joyous service, generate and radiate happiness to all around them. Their aim has not been to destroy the tribal customs, but to preserve all that is good in them."
