= Coen River =

Coen
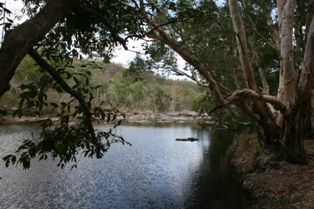
- Coen River

- Location of Coen River mouth in Queensland

Location
- Country: Australia
- State: Queensland
- Regions: Far North Queensland, Cape York Peninsula

Physical characteristics
- Source: Great Dividing Range
- 2nd source: Pandanus Creek
  - location: near Bend
  - elevation: 205 m (673 ft)
- Mouth: confluence with the Archer River
  - location: Oyala Thumotang National Park
  - coordinates: 13°36′21″S 142°09′30″E
  - elevation: 35 m (115 ft)
- Length: 217 km (135 mi)
- Basin size: 3,207 km^{2} (1,238 sq mi)

Basin features
- National park: Mungkan Kandju National Park

The Coen River is a river in the Cape York Peninsula in Queensland, Australia.

The headwaters of the river rise at the confluence of Pandanus Creek and an unnamed creek near Bend along the Peninsula Developmental Road in the Great Dividing Range. The river flows in an easterly direction crossing the Peninsula Developmental Road at Coen then veering north east through mostly uninhabited country including Mungkan Kandju National Park then heading east and eventually discharging into the Archer River. The Coen River is a tributary of the Archer River and was for a time known as the South Coen River.

The catchment area of the river occupies an 3,207 square kilometres (1,238 sq mi) of which an area of 29 square kilometres (11 sq mi) is composed of riverine wetlands.

The present (1996) Pennefather River (renamed 1894) was originally called the Coen River by Jan Carstenszoon in honour of Jan Pieterszoon Coen, Governor-General of the Dutch East Indies. The present Archer River was probably confused by Matthew Flinders with Carstenszoon's Coen River.

== See also ==
- List of rivers of Australia § Queensland
