= Wik peoples =

Aboriginal Australian people

The Wik peoples are an Indigenous Australian group of people from an extensive zone on western Cape York Peninsula in northern Queensland, speaking several different languages. They are from the coastal flood plains bounding the Gulf of Carpentaria lying between Pormpuraaw (Edward River) and Weipa, and inland the forested country drained by the Archer, Kendall and Holroyd rivers. The first ethnographic study of the Wik people was undertaken by the Queensland born anthropologist Ursula McConnel. Her fieldwork focused on groups gathered into the Archer River Mission at what is now known as Aurukun.

== Location ==
The Wik peoples inhabited the western coastal area of the Cape York Peninsula between the Winduwinda to the north and the Taior to the south, with the Wik-Mungkan on the eastern flank. (Note: Tindale's map reproduced in Sutton 1979, p. map 22)

McConnel's overall mapping was succinctly summarized by Sir James Frazer as follows:

[They] occupy a stretch of country along the Gulf of Carpentaria, thirty to fifty miles wide through which flow the Watson, Archer, Kendall, Holroyd and Edward Rivers. The territory of the Wik-Munkan begins below the junction of the Coen and Archer and the Pretender and Holroyd, and extends to the mouth of the Archer and the junction of the Kendall and Holroyd. It touches the Watson River in the north and the Edward in the south, and covers and area, roughly speaking, of three thousand square miles. The Wik-Munkan do not come in contact with the sea, for a strip of land along the coast varying in parts from two to ten miles wide is inhabited by kindred coastal tribes. Of these the Wik-Natera or Wik-Kalkan occupy the coast for sixty or seventy miles south of the Archer River, concentrating chiefly on two inland arms of the sea called Yoinka and Arimanka; the Wiki-Natanya or bush-rat people inhabit the corner of the coast between Arimanka and the Kendall - a distance of ten miles, and the Wik-Nantjara occupy the coastal country between the Kendall-Holroyd and the Edward.

McConnel's classification (1930) outlined the following groups

- The largest group, the Wik-Mungkan, were an inland tribe, neighbouring the Kokiala and Kaantju to the north and northeast, the Ayapathu to the east and southeast, and the Koko Taiyari south of the Edward river.
- The Wiknantjara, on the coast from the Edward river to the Kendall river, according to McConnel. Alternative name Ngandjara.
- The Wiknatanja (bush-rat people), a coastal people further north, allocated 300 square miles (780 km^{2}) by Tindale at the mouths of the Kendall river.
- The Wikmean were further north and inland from Cape Keerweer.
- The Wikepa also are thought to have had domains extending over 300 square miles (780 km^{2}) near Cape Keerweer.
- The Wik-kalkan lived on the coastal area, with an estimated 300 square miles (780 km^{2}) of territory.
- The Wikapatja had 100 square miles (260 km^{2}) around and on the mangrove islands of the Archer River delta.
- The Wikampama were on the Watson River, whose few remnants had mostly been detribalized by 1930 and lived at the Aurukun Mission Station.

All of these tribes were covered by Norman Tindale in his 1974 classification. Writing in 1997, Neva Collings stated that the group then comprised the peoples of Wik-Ompom, Wik-Paacha, Wik-Thinta, Wik-Ngathara, Wik-Epa, Wik-Me'anha, Wik-Ngathara, Wik-Nganychara, and Wik-Iiyanh.

== History ==
Under early colonization and settlement in northern Queensland it was widely thought that the indigenous peoples were "less than worthless, vermin which should be exterminated", and, according to Neva Collings, the Wik were regarded in these terms.

== Native title ==
The Wik Peoples won a landmark court case, which resulted in the formal recognition of their native title rights. The High Court of Australia later found that native title could coexist with a pastoral lease.

== See also ==
- Wik Peoples v Queensland
- Koowarta v Bjelke-Petersen
- Wik languages
- Wild Rivers in Australia

== Sources ==
- "AIATSIS map of Indigenous Australia". AIATSIS.
- Collings, Neva (1997). "The Wik: A History of Their 400 Year Struggle". Indigenous Law Bulletin. 4 (1). Australasian Legal Information Institute.
- Frazer, James George (1994) [First published 1937]. Totemica: A Supplement to Totemism and Exogamy. The Collected Works of J. G. Frazer. Vol. 7. RoutledgeCurzon. ISBN 978-0-867-60095-7.
- Harris, John (1990). One Blood: 200 Years of Aboriginal Encounter with Christianity: a Story of Hope. Albatross Books. ISBN 978-0-867-60095-7.
- McConnel, Ursula (April 1930a). "The Wik-Munkan Tribe of Cape York Peninsula". Oceania. 1 (1): 97–104. doi:10.1002/j.1834-4461.1930.tb00005.x. JSTOR 40373036.
- McConnel, Ursula (July 1930b). "The Wik-Munkan Tribe. Part II. Totemism". Oceania. 1 (2): 181–205. doi:10.1002/j.1834-4461.1930.tb01644.x. JSTOR 40327320.
- Needham, Rodney (April 1962). "Genealogy and Category in Wikmunkan Society". Ethnology. 1 (2): 223–264. doi:10.2307/3772877. JSTOR 3772877.
- Robinson, Olivia; Barnard, Trish (2010). ""Thanks, but we'll take it from here": Australian Aboriginal and Torres Strait Islander Women Influencing the Collection of Tangible and Intangible Heritage.". In Levin, Amy K. (ed.). Gender, Sexuality and Museums: A Routledge Reader. Routledge. pp. 129–137. ISBN 978-1-136-94364-5.
- Sutton, Peter (1979). Wik: Aboriginal society, territory and language at Cape Keerweer, Cape York Peninsula, Australia (PDF) (PhD thesis). University of Queensland.
- Tindale, Norman Barnett (1974). Aboriginal Tribes of Australia: Their Terrain, Environmental Controls, Distribution, Limits, and Proper Names (PDF). Australian National University. ISBN 978-0-708-10741-6.
- "Wik Peoples' native title recognised" (Media Release). National Native Title Tribunal. 14 October 2000.
