= Dark Emu =

2014 book by Bruce Pascoe

Dark Emu: Black Seeds: Agriculture or Accident?
- Author: Bruce Pascoe
- Language: English
- Genre: Non-fiction; History
- Publication date: 2014
- Publication place: Australia
- ISBN: 1921248017

Dark Emu: Black Seeds: Agriculture or Accident? is a 2014 non-fiction book by Bruce Pascoe. It re-examines colonial accounts of Aboriginal people in Australia, and cites evidence of pre-colonial agriculture, engineering and building construction by Aboriginal and Torres Strait Islander peoples. A second edition, published under the title Dark Emu: Aboriginal Australia and the Birth of Agriculture was published in mid-2018, and a version of the book for younger readers, entitled Young Dark Emu: A Truer History, was published in 2019.

Both the first and the children's editions were shortlisted for major awards, and the former won two awards in the New South Wales Premier's Literary Awards. The book has also proved very popular with the Australian public, selling 250,000 copies by mid-2021. Its strengths have been said to lie in the storytelling style, making it more accessible to the general reader than the more scholarly examinations of Aboriginal history in the past.

According to the Australian Broadcasting Corporation, the publication of Dark Emu "ignited a culture war". The book has been praised for stimulating debate about the diversity of Indigenous economic and land management practices. However, academics have challenged some of its claims, especially Pascoe's thesis that Indigenous Australian society was based to such a large extent on sedentary agriculture rather than hunting and gathering.

== Editions ==
The first edition, entitled Dark Emu: Black Seeds: Agriculture or Accident?, was published by Magabala Books in 2014. The title refers to what is known as the Emu in the sky constellation in Aboriginal astronomy, known as Gugurmin, or "dark emu" to the Wiradjuri people.

A second edition, entitled Dark Emu: Aboriginal Australia and the Birth of Agriculture was published in June 2018, and a version of the book for younger readers, entitled Young Dark Emu: A Truer History, was published in 2019. The 2019 version was shortlisted for the 2020 Adelaide Festival Awards for Literature in the Children's Literature Award section.

== Contents ==
In Dark Emu Pascoe draws on the writings of early British settlers and recent decades of scholarship to argue that traditional Aboriginal society was characterised by agriculture, aquaculture, elaborate engineering, villages of permanent structures, and other features which are incompatible with the view that Aboriginal Australians were only hunter-gatherers. He states, "The belief that Aboriginal people were 'mere' hunter-gatherers has been used as a political tool to justify dispossession."

Pascoe quotes Charles Sturt, Thomas Mitchell and other explorers and settlers who describe Aboriginal hayricks, stooks, crops and villages, and Aboriginal people practising seed selection, soil preparation, crop harvesting, and storing surplus crops. He also describes Sturt's 1845 encounter with hundreds of Aboriginal people who were living in a village near Cooper Creek and offered him water, roast duck, cake and a hut to sleep in. Pascoe concludes that, "most Aboriginal Australians were ... in the early stages of an agricultural society, and, it could be argued, ahead of many other parts of the world".

Pascoe provides evidence of Aboriginal dams, weirs, sluices and fish traps, and argues that pre-colonial Aboriginal people practiced aquaculture. He cites the work of archaeologist Heather Builth and palynologist Peter Kershaw and concludes that sites at Lake Condah in western Victoria are elaborately engineered eel and fish traps associated with permanent stone buildings built by the Gunditjmara people around 8,000 years ago.

Pascoe quotes nineteenth century accounts of Aboriginal people living in villages and towns with sturdy huts, the largest of which could accommodate 30–40 people. Sturt reported a town of 1,000 people on the Darling River. Pascoe states that towns such as the collection of stone structures at Lake Condah are evidence of sedentary or semi-sedentary Aboriginal culture. He concludes, "Permanent housing was a feature of the pre-contact Aboriginal economy, and marked the movement towards agricultural reliance."

Pascoe acknowledges his debt to the work of Rupert Gerritsen, who in 2008 published Australia and the Origins of Agriculture, which argued that some Aboriginal people were farmers as much as hunter-gatherers. Pascoe also draws on the work of historian Bill Gammage, author of The Biggest Estate on Earth: How Aborigines Made Australia (2012), which looks at how Aboriginal people used fire, dams and cropping to support themselves sustainably in their environment.

In the last two chapters of Dark Emu, titled "Australian Agricultural Revolution" and "Accepting History and Creating the Future", Pascoe advocates for changes in current Australian methods of agriculture and lifestyle. Pascoe says that Australia could learn from Indigenous culture and landcare, replacing wheat with native grasses and eating kangaroo rather than cattle.

== Reception ==
=== Sales and reviews ===
The book received critical acclaim, winning two NSW Premier's Literary Awards (Book of the Year and the Indigenous Writers' Prize) and being shortlisted for two other prizes (the History Book Award in the Queensland Literary Awards and Victorian Premier's Award for Indigenous Writing), as well as mainstream recognition. It was reviewed by three Australian teachers' associations, earned positive reviews in other media, and, with the highest number of nominations by members of the public, was chosen to be the first book discussed in the inaugural meeting of the Parliamentary Book Club. A new edition was published in 2018. By mid 2021 the book had sold 250,000 copies. There is an audiobook and ebook version.

=== Praise ===
Historian Bill Gammage, whose 2012 work The Biggest Estate on Earth: How Aborigines Made Australia influenced Dark Emu, praised Pascoe's gift for weaving a narrative that challenges many readers' preconceptions. He admired the book for its impact, but added that Pascoe sometimes romanticises pre-contact Indigenous society, and his claims that Stone Age Indigenous people invented democracy and baking may be "push[ing] these things too far".

Lynette Russell, at Monash University's Indigenous Studies Centre and co-author of Australia's First Naturalists: Indigenous Peoples' Contribution to Early Zoology, admired Dark Emu's achievement in popularising ideas that challenged European Australians' cultural preconceptions. She said that it had managed to promulgate more widely "information about indigenous land management practices that archaeologists have known for a long time".

Tony Hughes-D'Aeth, a researcher in cultural history at the University of Western Australia, said that Dark Emu "provides the most concerted attempt [yet] to answer the question about the quality of the country ... in the pre-colonial epoch", and that the book's strengths lie in "its ability to bridge archaeology, anthropology, archival history, Indigenous oral tradition and other more esoteric but highly revealing disciplines such as ethnobotany and paleoecology".

Writer and historian James Boyce, after some discussion of the book's strengths and weaknesses, says that, although a "flawed attempt", the book's appeal is to "a community of folk who ... are eager to learn from and engage with First Nations peoples and their heritage"; Pascoe is a skilled storyteller, and Dark Emu is a significant cultural achievement because it has engaged these readers, where many other examples of scholarly information have not done so. While there is no single narrative that tells the whole story, Dark Emu might be the first step for many readers who have not previously engaged with the history of dispossession of the Indigenous peoples of Australia.

Writer Gregory Day, writes that Pascoe's book connects with general readers because "he knows what it feels like to be a whitefella – in a sense, Bruce is translating it for this whitefellas".

Archaeologists Michael Westaway and Joshua Gorringe argue that Dark Emu will stimulate further research: "Gerritsen’s research and Pascoe’s popularised account have inspired and stimulated a different way of thinking about Aboriginal food production systems, and how we might investigate an archaeological record for Aboriginal village settlements... Dark Emu provides a different account of the Aboriginal past, written by an Aboriginal person outside of the academy, which challenges us to think differently about how we might define Aboriginal people... it is up to archaeologists now to test Pascoe’s hypothesis".

=== Debate and criticism ===
Pascoe's book has been extensively debated in Australian media and political spheres.

Several academics have criticised Pascoe's claim that since 1880 scholars have suppressed accounts of sophisticated housing and food and environmental management practices in traditional Aboriginal societies. Peter Hiscock, chair of archaeology at Sydney University, archaeologist Harry Lourandos, who documented the construction of eel traps in Victoria in the 1970s, and Ian McNiven of Monash University's Indigenous Studies Centre all agree that there is a large body of published work on the topic. Lourandos and McNiven stated that they appreciate the book's success in reaching the broader public.

Some academics have specifically addressed the debate surrounding Dark Emu's thesis that Indigenous Australian society was largely built on sedentary agriculture rather than hunting and gathering. Anthropologist Ian Keen argues against Pascoe's thesis that Indigenous Australians practised agriculture. He concluded that "Aboriginal people were indeed hunters, gatherers and fishers at the time of the British colonisation of Australia", although acknowledging "the boundary between foraging and farming is a fuzzy one".

Historians Lynette Russell and Billy Griffiths wrote that Pascoe had drawn together an enormous amount of ethnographic evidence showing that Aboriginal peoples "were not hapless wanderers across the soil, mere hunter-gatherers"; however, they challenge the implicit Eurocentric idea that agriculture is the result of "progress" on a continuum from hunter-gathering, or that such an evolutionary hierarchy exists. They argue that Western terminology lacks nuance, and stated, "Communities have shifted between these categories and moved back and forth as suited their needs". James Boyce agrees with this view: "The 'progress' inherent to a move from foraging to farming has been questioned by historians, anthropologists and archaeologists for more than 50 years ... there was rarely a sharp line between farming and hunter-gatherer ways of life".

In Farmers or Hunter-Gatherers? The Dark Emu Debate (2021), anthropologist Peter Sutton and archaeologist Keryn Walshe suggest that Dark Emu devalues pre-colonial Aboriginal society, privileging agriculture above a hunter-gatherer socio-economic system. They also criticise the work on grounds of being poorly researched, not fully sourced, and selective in its choice and emphasis of the facts. In James Boyce's opinion, their most salient criticisms include that Pascoe uses white explorers' journals, ignoring the knowledge of Aboriginal sources, and also that he generalises from local examples and claims incorrectly that such technologies were used across the continent. Boyce is also critical of some aspects of Sutton and Walshe's work.

Aboriginal human rights advocate Hannah McGlade, a Noongar woman and member of the United Nations Permanent Forum on Indigenous Issues, writes in The Australian that Dark Emu is "misleading and offensive to Aboriginal people and culture" and that it "is not very truthful or accurate". Warrimay historian Victoria Grieve-Williams, also in The Australian, calls Dark Emu a scandal and a hoax, and expresses deep concerns in the Aboriginal community about the story Pascoe is telling, saying that her family were not farmers, but proud of being hunter–gatherers.

After Pauline Hanson's One Nation MP Mark Latham proposed in the New South Wales Parliament in June 2021 that the book should be banned from use by teachers in NSW schools (where it is not part of the curriculum, but available as a historical source for critical discussion), his motion had little support. The Minister for Indigenous Australians, Ken Wyatt, commented that he welcomed "more people taking the time to read Dark Emu and consulting Mr Pascoe's references to verify or disprove his assertions as we do with various academic studies or research ... What's important here is that we are open to hearing other people's perspectives, contemplating and genuinely engaging in working constructively together to reconcile our understandings".

On 11 September 2021, Pascoe published in the Sydney Morning Herald a reflection in which he wrote:

There has been some criticism of my book, Dark Emu, but when I read the book, [Farmers or Hunter-Gathers? The Dark Emu Debate by Peter Sutton and Keryn Walshe], which claims to repudiate it, I was amazed at how frequently the writers agreed with me. The big sticking point seems to be what we call the precolonial Aboriginal economy and culture. I don’t really care what it is called as long as Australians are allowed to know that Aboriginal people sometimes lived in houses and villages, often employed technology to harvest food and sometimes wore cloaks and sewn apparel.

I want all Australians to know that their country had an automatic fishing machine, that Aboriginal people often built houses that could accommodate 50 people, that miles of aqueducts and channels had been built to harvest fish. I can't believe anyone would not want their fellow countrywomen and men to have this knowledge about their country and not to consider what this says about our history. Whether the history is 65,000 or 120,000 years or more, we know that it is the oldest human civilisation on earth.

It’s not about a culture being better or worse than any other, it's about the true history of the land and how the First Nations culture managed their economy and society. And how that sovereignty was taken away. It still surprises me that airwaves melt down when someone suggests that the invasion of Australia was just that, an invasion.

== Awards and accolades ==
- 2014: Shortlisted – History Book Award in the Queensland Literary Awards
- 2014: Shortlisted – Victorian Premier's Literary Award for Indigenous Writing
- 2016: Winner – two NSW Premier's Literary Awards: Book of the Year and the Indigenous Writers' Prize
- 2019: Chosen by the public for the first Parliamentary Book Club
- 2020: Young Dark Emu: A Truer History shortlisted for the 2020 Adelaide Festival Awards for Literature in the Children's Literature Award section.

== Adaptations ==
- The Bangarra Dance Theatre Dark Emu production was first performed in 2018 at the Sydney Opera House.
- Young Dark Emu: A Truer History, was published in 2019, intended for school use.
- Blackfella Films adapted Dark Emu as a documentary film, featuring Stan Grant, Marcia Langton, Bill Gammage, Narelda Jacobs, and others. The feature documentary was released in 2023 called The Dark Emu Story and screened at CinefestOZ and the Sydney Film Festival, before being screened on ABC Television in July 2023 and on ABC iview. The doco won the Longform Journalism: Documentary Award in the 68th Walkley Awards in November 2023.

== See also ==
- 1491: New Revelations of the Americas Before Columbus
- Billy Griffiths
- Braiding Sweetgrass
- History wars
