= Ward River (Far North Queensland) =

River in Queensland, Australia

Ward
- Location of Ward River mouth in Queensland

Location
- Country: Australia
- State: Queensland
- Region: Far North Queensland

Physical characteristics
- Source: Cape York Peninsula
  - elevation: 42 m (138 ft)
- Mouth: Archer Bay
  - location: north of Aurukun
  - coordinates: 13°17′36″S 141°44′12″E
  - elevation: 0 m (0 ft)
- Length: 46 km (29 mi)

Basin features
- River system: Watson River catchment

The Ward River is a river in Far North Queensland, Australia.

The headwaters of the river rise on the Cape York Peninsula approximately 12 kilometres (7 mi) from the west coast and flows south through uninhabited country along the coastal plain and eventually discharges into Archer Bay, along with the Archer and Watson River, just north of Aurukun and then onto the Gulf of Carpentaria. Four tributaries contribute to the Ward; Coconut Creek, Tappelbang Creek, Sandy Creek and Possum Creek.

The river is located within the Watson River catchment and in 2009 the river was considered for nomination as a wild river.

== See also ==
- List of rivers of Australia § Queensland
