= Wik Paach language =

Extinct language of Queensland, Australia

Wik Paach
- Region: Queensland
- Ethnicity: Wikapatja
- Extinct: by 1973
- Language family: Pama–Nyungan: (unclassified, presumably Paman); Wik Paach

Language codes
- ISO 639-3: None (mis)
- Glottolog: None
- AIATSIS: Y47

Wik Paach (Wikapatja), also known as Abodja, is an extinct Australian language of Queensland. It remains unclassified. The form of the name comes from one of the Wik languages, where wik means "language", but Paach is not itself a member of that family.

The language was traditionally spoken in the Archer River area.
