= Ayabadhu language =

Extinct Australian Aboriginal language

Ayabadhu
- Native to: Australia
- Region: Cape York Peninsula, Queensland; north of Coleman River, south of Coen.
- Ethnicity: Ayapathu, Yintyingka
- Extinct: (date missing)
- Language family: Pama–Nyungan: Paman; North Cape York; Wik; Ayabadhu

Language codes
- ISO 639-3: ayd
- Glottolog: ayab1239
- AIATSIS: Y60
- ELP: Ayapathu

Ayabadhu (Ayapathu), or Badhu, is an extinct Australian Aboriginal language of the Paman family spoken on the Cape York Peninsula of North Queensland, Australia by the Ayapathu people. The Ayabadhu language region includes the Cook Shire and the areas around Coen and Port Stewart.

Verstraete and Rigsby (2015) determined that Ayabadhu and Yintyingka, spoken by the Yintyingka and Lamalama and previously known as coastal Ayapathu, are closely related and dialects of the same language. They also found these dialects to be "structurally different" to Western Ayapathu. The name Yintjinggu/Jintjingga has been used for both Ayabadhu and the neighboring Umbindhamu language.

== Phonology ==
=== Vowels ===
	Front	Central	Back
Close	i iː		u uː
Mid	ɛ ɛː		ɔ ɔː
Open		a aː	

=== Consonants ===
	Peripheral		Laminal		Apical	Glottal
	Labial	Velar	Dental	Palatal	Alveolar	Glottal
Plosive	p	k	t̪	c	t	ʔ
Nasal	m	ŋ	n̪	ɲ	n	
Rhotic					r	
Lateral					l	
Approximant	w			j	ɹ	

- Consonants may show gemination [Cː] when in intervocalic position after a stressed initial-syllable with a short vowel.
- Stops may be heard as voiced [b, ɡ, d̪, ɟ, d] when following nasal sounds or within the onset of a third syllable in trisyllablic words.
- /t/ may also have a trilled allophone [tʳ] within the onset of a second syllable.
- /w/ may also be heard as a fricative [β] or an approximant [β̞] within intervocalic positions.

== Vocabulary ==
Some words from the Ayabadhu language, as spelt and written by Ayabadhu authors include:

- 'Agu: land
- 'Eka: head
- Kaleny: uncle
- Kangka: leaf
- Ko'on: magpie goose
- Kuche: two
- Mayi: food
- Punga: sun
- Wanthi punga: good day
