= Farmers or Hunter-Gatherers? =

2021 book by Peter Sutton and Keryn Walshe

Farmers or Hunter-Gatherers? The Dark Emu Debate
- Author: Peter Sutton and Keryn Walshe
- Language: English
- Genre: Non-fiction; History
- Publication date: 2021
- Publication place: Australia
- Pages: 264
- ISBN: 9780522877854

Farmers or Hunter-Gatherers? The Dark Emu Debate is a non-fiction book on Indigenous Australian history by Peter Sutton and Keryn Walshe, published in mid-2021 by Melbourne University Press. It was written as a response to Bruce Pascoe's highly successful 2014 non-fiction book Dark Emu: Black Seeds: Agriculture or Accident? which describes evidence of agricultural and engineering activities by some Indigenous Australian groups, and suggests a more sedentary lifestyle than the more orthodox assessment that they were purely hunter-gatherers. Sutton and Walshe reject Pascoe's thesis of Indigenous agriculture, and argue that his book contains serious errors and omissions.

== Contents ==
The book has a foreword written by Wiradjuri archaeologist and lecturer Kellie Pollard and ANU Emeritus Professor Tom Griffiths.

Eleven chapters are written by Sutton and two by Walshe. Many of the chapters are structured thematically, while others address the controversy related to Pascoe's Dark Emu. Walshe also contributed Appendix 1 of the book, which addresses the question of when Aboriginal Australians first settled on the Australian continent. Appendix 2 records the movements of convict William Buckley, who escaped captivity in 1803 and lived with the Wathaurong people on Victoria's Bellarine Peninsula for 32 years, eventually becoming a Ngurungaeta, or tribal leader. Their source base includes archaeological, anthropological, and linguistic evidence, in addition to the accounts of Indigenous people, or "the Old People" in their terminology, of the pre-colonial mode of production. They note that colonist journals, which form the bulk of Pascoe's sources, give only a superficial account of Indigenous society, and question Pascoe's failure to consult Indigenous accounts of pre-colonial society.

Sutton and Walshe devote a chapter to analysis of linguistic evidence, drawing on Sutton's command of several Aboriginal languages. They observe that while pre-colonial Melanesian Torres Strait Island languages like Mabuiag and Meryam Mir have extensive terminology related to gardening and planting, their analysis of more than 40 Aboriginal languages reveals a near-total absence of such words.

Another chapter addresses the degree of mobility and sedentism, observing that the highest level of sedentism was in areas around the Western District of Victoria, the Murray River, and eastern Cape York. They discuss William Buckley's account of the eel traps at Lake Condah in western Victoria, and deduce that a "semi-sedentary occupation pattern" was likely, with dwellings being occupied for months at a time around the eeling season. Conversely, the highest levels of mobility were found in the arid Simpson Desert and Western Desert regions. They note that the Pintupi people of the Western Desert cultural bloc could move between areas of up to 4,800 km^{2} (1,900 sq mi) in a year, and cite the account of a Warlpiri man named Pariparu, who in the 1930s gave an account of 332 desert places he had walked to in the previous 11 months alone. Other groups in the far north moved with the monsoon, or followed seasonal food sources.

== Critique of Dark Emu ==
The work is the first scholarly critique published in monograph form. Throughout their book, Sutton and Walshe reject what they see as Pascoe's "social evolutionist" approach that perceives agricultural development and material factors as preconditions of "advancement", and the binary view that Pascoe establishes between "mere" hunter-gatherers and agriculturalists. They express the view that Aboriginal people were "complex hunter-gatherers, not simple farmers" and "ecological agents who worked with the environment, rather than, usually against it", to emphasise the skill and sophistication with which they managed country and prevailing environmental conditions. They call for an appreciation of "the complexities of Aboriginal mental and aesthetic culture: those highly intricate webs of kinship, mythology, ritual performance, grammars, visual arts and land tenure", criticising Pascoe for neglecting these non-material elements. They observe that Aboriginal people interacted with Torres Strait Islander and Makassan peoples in the north of Australia, but consciously chose not to adopt their agricultural practices for a variety of cultural and economic reasons.

Sutton and Walshe reject Pascoe's hypothesis that pre-colonial Indigenous Australian societies were based on sedentary agriculture. They argue that planting is a crucial defining element of agriculture and that the evidence that Aboriginal people sowed seeds is rare and ambiguous. They argue that protected breeding and rearing of aquatic animals is a key element of aquaculture and this was absent in Aboriginal societies. They state that the practices which Pascoe characterises as agriculture and aquaculture were the exceptions rather than the rule in Aboriginal societies.

They contend that Dark Emu upholds a Eurocentric worldview, privileging agriculture above a hunter-gatherer socio-economic system. They state that Dark Emu is "littered with unsourced material, is poorly researched, distorts and exaggerates many points, selectively emphasises evidence to suit those opinions, and ignores large bodies of information that do not support the author's opinions". They conclude that Dark Emu is "actually not, properly considered, a work of scholarship" and that "its success as a narrative has been achieved in spite of its failure as an account of fact".

Sutton and Walshe conclude by stating that despite their strong criticisms of the rigour and accuracy of Dark Emu, Pascoe's work has had a positive impact in sparking discussion of and interest in Australia's first peoples.

== Reception and commentary ==
Sutton and Walshe's book has received acclaim from many quarters. Tim Rowse writes that Sutton and Walshe "chip away at so many parts of Pascoe's thesis that it is, in my opinion, demolished". A review in The Conversation describes Farmers or Hunter-Gatherers? as "just about perfect – a volume with the twin virtues of rigour and readability", and also that it "needs to be read carefully, keeping an open mind".

Historian Mark McKenna writes of Sutton and Walshe's "forensic critique", stating that they "methodically expose the flaws in Dark Emu [and] argue how Pascoe ignores, omits, distorts and exaggerates crucial evidence, rehearses well-worn claims, commits fundamental errors, and rebirths the outmoded doctrine of 'social evolutionism' by presenting traditional Aboriginal societies as farmers". McKenna states that Dark Emu provides "an opportunity to deepen Australians' knowledge of our Indigenous cultures", and declares that "we're witnessing a public argument about Aboriginal people and their cultures, rather than a discussion with them". McKenna states that without Pascoe's contribution to Australian culture, "Sutton's and Walshe's valuable book would not exist".

Warraimaay historian Victoria Grieves Williams praised the book as "a meticulously referenced defence of the disciplines of anthropology and archaeology that have come to hold the knowledge of Aboriginal people". She says that Sutton pays deep respect to the agency of Aboriginal people in the development of this knowledge base by acknowledging 59 major cultural mentors, language and bushcraft teachers from 19 different locations in the Northern Territory, Queensland and South Australia. In contrast, Bruce Pascoe relied on white explorers' journals. Bundjalung leader and politician Warren Mundine questioned the credibility of Dark Emu, in light of Sutton and Walshe's work, and observes that Pascoe's claim of pre-colonial agricultural practices was inconsistent with the lack of songlines or Dreamtime stories referring to such practices.

Criticism of Sutton and Walshe's book has come from anthropologist Richard Davis, who queries Sutton's difficulty in recognising Aboriginal people's ability to undergo change over time. Davis questions Sutton's dismissal of Pascoe on the grounds that he is not a trained anthropologist, which Davis argues dismisses non-academic points of view, such as Pascoe's, on the lives of pre-colonial Aboriginal people.

Writer and historian James Boyce writes that the work is important for those "who want to discuss the issues it raises outside the nasty platforms of the culture wars". He states that Sutton and Walshe's most salient criticisms include that Pascoe uses white explorers' journals, ignoring the knowledge of Aboriginal sources, and also that he generalises from local examples and claims incorrectly that such technologies were used across the continent. He is critical of some aspects of Sutton and Walshe's work, stating that some of their points seem "petty or overblown". He criticises their use of historical information such as the 1836 "census" of Aboriginal people in the Port Phillip District and the accounts of William Buckley. He states that Sutton and Walsh do not refute Pascoe's assertion that the majority of Australians assume the inferiority of its Indigenous peoples, as the majority may not be aware of the large body of accessible and accurate material on Indigenous Australian cultures.

Despite Sutton and Walshe's criticism of Dark Emu, Pascoe responded positively to the publication of Farmers or Hunter-Gatherers?, saying that he "welcome[d] the discussion and difference of opinion as it should further this important examination of our history".

== See also ==
- Australian history wars
