= Piccaninny Plains Sanctuary =

Coordinates: 13°14′14″S 142°38′28″E

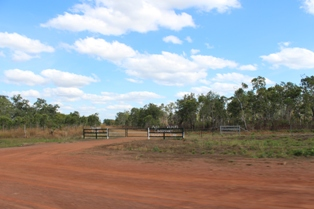
Piccaninny Plains Wildlife Sanctuary in Cape York

Piccaninny Plains Wildlife Sanctuary is a 1700 km^{2} nature reserve on the Cape York Peninsula of Far North Queensland, Australia. A former cattle station adjacent to Oyala Thumotang National Park, it is managed by the Australian Wildlife Conservancy (AWC). It is jointly owned by The Tony and Lisette Lewis Foundation and the Australian Wildlife Conservancy, by which it was purchased in 2008. The name 'Piccaninny Plains' refers to the racial slur 'piccaninny' used as a disrespectful term for Aboriginal children.

== Landscape and climate ==
The location of Piccaninny Plains in the middle of the Cape York Peninsula between national park and Aboriginal land forms a habitat corridor that helps link the east and west coasts of the Peninsula. The property contains several diverse ecosystems such as gallery rainforest, tropical grasslands, wetlands and floodplains. The Archer and Wenlock Rivers flow through the property. The climate is tropical monsoonal, with most rain falling in the wet season, December to April. Rainfall averages 1600 mm annually.

== Fauna ==
Animals found on Piccaninny Plains include the palm cockatoo, trumpet manucode, yellow-billed kingfisher, magnificent riflebird and spotted cuscus.

In 2025, a Northern quoll was observed, the first in more than 80 years for this area.
