= Isobel Wolmby =

(1917–1989) Indigenous culture informant

- Born: 1917; Cape York Peninsula
- Died: 26 May 1989 (aged 71–72); Aurukun
- Education: mission
- Known for: oral historian of the Wik peoples
- Partner: Victor Wolmby
- Children: Marjorie
- Parent(s): Yukwainten Wontuttin Peeoont Koowaytairun Marpoondin and Billy Wildfellow

Isobel Wolmby or Kornomnayuh Telpo’ana Gothachalkenin, (1917 – 26 May 1989) was an Australian indigenous culture informant. She lived her life in Queensland where she was educated at the Aurukun mission.

== Life ==
Wolmby was born on the Cape York Peninsula in Queensland in 1917. Her mother, Yukwainten Wontuttin Peeoont Koowaytairun Marpoondin, was one of the eight wives of Billy Wildfellow and she had sixteen siblings or half-siblings. She was one of the Wik people and her home was at Wildfellow or Thaangkunh-nhiin. Wolmby described it as an area poor in natural resources. The family did not move about much but they would visit the Knox river. During term time she and the other girls would be left at the mission at Aurukun.

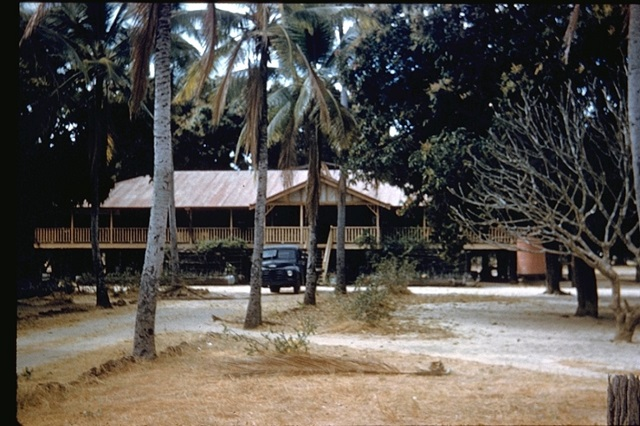
The Superintendent's residence at Aurukun, circa 1959

At the mission, children resided in dormitories, although they returned to their families during the vacations. Young adults were trained for servile work. Mackenzie's punishments were described as "harsh, unorthodox, and arbitrary – they included the use of banishment, corporal punishment, including flogging and beating, use of his fists, use of the 'electro magnet', binding the mouth to stop verbal abuse and swearing." She had married Victor Wolmby and they had one child named Marjorie. In 1956, Victor and Isobel were exiled from the camp by the Reverend William Mackenzie because Victor had fathered a child with another woman. The two of them attached themselves to the "Old Arraman Mob" and she gathered tales from some of the last local aboriginal people who were not living in a mission or similar. Victor was to become recognised as a leader and Isobel became a source of the group's verbal history.

In 1976 she and her husband adopted the anthropologist Peter Sutton as their tribal son. He regarded Isobel as a mother, particularly after Victor died. She taught him the Wik dialect that they spoke. She became one of Sutton's prime sources for linguistics and ethnography. They spent months together at several camps and at the outstation at Watha-nhiin. Sutton was to write her biography for the Australian Dictionary of Biography. He was to be troubled by the number of people who died related to his Wolmby family.

In 1986 she and her mother were still alive. She is included in an account of how 28 people travelled by two trips in a Land Rover.

Wolmby died in Aurukun during a fight on 26 May 1989. She did not drink but during a struggle with another woman she died. The inquest into her death could find no connection between the failure of her heart and the fight. In 1990 a book of essays was published naming her as the author.
