= Watson River (Queensland) =

River in Queensland, Australia

Watson
- Location of Watson River mouth in Queensland

Location
- Country: Australia
- State: Queensland
- Region: Far North Queensland

Physical characteristics
- Source: Emberley Range
  - elevation: 40 m (130 ft)
- Mouth: Gulf of Carpentaria
  - location: Archer Bay
  - coordinates: 13°22′45″S 141°43′50″E
  - elevation: 0 m (0 ft)
- Length: 92 km (57 mi)
- Basin size: 4,679 km^{2} (1,807 sq mi)

The Watson River is a river in Far North Queensland, Australia.

The headwaters of the river rise near the Aurukun Road and flows in a south westerly direction to Watson Crossing and continues through a valley before discharging into Archer Bay near Aurukun along with the Archer River and the Ward River, then onto the Gulf of Carpentaria. From source to mouth, the Watson River is joined by four tributaries, descending 40 metres (130 ft) over its 92-kilometre (57 mi) course.

The catchment occupies an area of 4,679 square kilometres (1,807 sq mi) and is bordered by the Archer River drainage basin to the south. The catchment contains large wetland areas with the margins covered in stringybark forests and paperbark lined lagoons that are vital refuges for wildlife during the dry season.

Several species of fish are known to inhabit the river including the empire gudgeon, northern trout gudgeon, chequered rainbowfish, black-banded rainbowfish, banded rainbowfish, spotted blue-eye, Obbes catfish, delicate blue-eyes fish and barramundi.

The traditional owners of the area are the Wik, Winda Winda and Mbelwum peoples.

== See also ==
- List of rivers of Australia § Queensland
