= Peter Sutton (anthropologist) =

Australian anthropologist (born 1946)

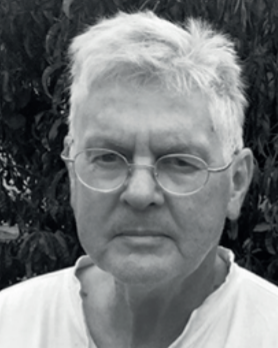
- Dr Peter Sutton 2017
- Born: 1946 (age 79–80)
- Citizenship: Australian
- Education: Monash University
- Scientific career
- Fields: Aboriginal languages, Anthropology of Aboriginal Australia
- Workplaces: South Australian Museum's; Division of Humanities; University of Adelaide; Department of Ecology and Evolutionary Biology, School of Biological Sciences, Faculty of Sciences, University of Adelaide

Peter Sutton FASSA (born 1946) is an Australian social anthropologist and linguist who has, since 1969, contributed to: recording Australian Aboriginal languages; promoting Australian Aboriginal art; mapping Australian Aboriginal cultural landscapes; and increasing societies' general understanding of contemporary Australian Aboriginal social structures and systems of land tenure. In 1976 Isobel Wolmby and her husband of the Wik peoples adopted Sutton as their tribal son.

From 2004 to 2008, Sutton held an Australian Research Council (ARC) Professorial Fellowship at the University of Adelaide's School of Earth & Environmental Sciences and within the South Australian Museum's Division of Anthropology. In 2003-2009, he was an Honorary Research Fellow at the Institute of Archaeology, University College London.

== Early life ==
Born in Melbourne in 1946, Peter Sutton's earliest years were spent growing up in a Port Melbourne working class environment His paternal grandfather was a driver at the local fish markets (and prone to violent, alcoholic outbursts). His paternal grandmother worked in the Swallow and Ariell Biscuit Factory. His maternal grandfather was a pastry cook, and his mother and father began life as factory workers.

His father attended, and was profoundly affected by, a Lord Somers Camp held to 'dissolve' class barriers between waterfront children and the sons and daughters of Melbourne's doctors and lawyers, and, early on he and his wife pushed to break out of the working class mould:

"We were not dirt poor, but my mother pushed to get out of Port Melbourne, to get a small business, a Milk Bar in East Malvern, and then a block of land and build a house."

In 1976, Isobel Wolmby and her husband of the Wik peoples adopted Sutton as their tribal son. He regarded Isobel as a mother, particularly after Victor died. She taught him the Wik dialect that they spoke. She had been educated at the mission in Aurukun in Queensland where she had married. She was exiled for a year and spent time in the 1950s with people living outside the missions. She became one of Sutton's prime sources for linguistics and ethnography. They spent months together at several camps and at the outstation at Watha-nhiin.

== Career ==
After working as an anthropologist and linguist in Aboriginal Australia for more than 40 years, publishing or co-writing more than 15 books on Aboriginal languages, art, culture and land rights, Peter Sutton wrote a book titled The Politics of Suffering: Indigenous Australia and the end of the Liberal consensus (2009) in which he reflects upon all he has seen and begins questioning Australian public policy across all those years, as follows:

"Through personal observation, forensic rigour and an anthropologist's eye, he questions the foundations on which 40 years of public policy, often imposed with bipartisan goodwill, has been constructed"

A 2016 symposium on Sutton's life and work led to a two-volume tribute: Finlayson and Morphy (eds) 2020, Ethnographer and Contrarian. Biographical and Anthropological Essays in Honour of Peter Sutton, and Monaghan and Walsh (eds), More than Mere Words. Essays on Language and Linguistics in Honour of Peter Sutton. Both Wakefield Press.

In 2021, Sutton published two books: Farmers or Hunter-Gatherers? The Dark Emu Debate (with Keryn Walshe), a forensic critique of Bruce Pascoe’s Dark Emu, and Linguistic Organisation and Native Title: The Wik Case, Australia(with Ken Hale).

By 2021, when he retired from consulting work, Sutton had acted in various differing capacities as a researcher assisting with 87 Aboriginal land claims in three jurisdictions: the Aboriginal Land Rights Act (Northern Territory) 1976, the Queensland Aboriginal Land Act 1992, and the Native Title Act 1993.

== Awards ==
- Anisfield-Wolf Award (Anisfield-Wolf Foundation, USA 1988), for serious works that combat racism, awarded to Sutton (ed.) Dreamings (1988).
- James Henry Breasted Prize (American Historical Association, USA 1999, for the best English-language book on the ancient and early medieval history of Africa, North America and Latin America, awarded to the Woodward and Lewis (eds) volume The History of Cartography, Volume 2.3: Cartography in the Traditional African, American, Arctic, Australian, and Pacific Societies (1998, contains two chapters by Sutton, see papers below)
- The Manning Clark House National Cultural Award for an outstanding contribution to the quality of Australian cultural life in 2009, for The Politics of Suffering: Indigenous Australia and the End of the Liberal Consensus..
- The 2010 John Button Prize for the best piece of non-fiction writing on politics or public policy published in Australia in the previous year, for The Politics of Suffering: Indigenous Australia and the End of the Liberal Consensus.

== Bibliography ==
- MORPHY, Howard (2001)"Seeing Aboriginal Art in the Gallery", Humanities Research Volume 8. Number 1
- MORTON, John (2007) "Sansom, Sutton and Sackville: Three Expert Anthropologists?". Anthropological Forum. Volume 17. Number 2. Pages 170–173
- PONSONNET, Maia. (2007) "Recognising victims without blaming them: a moral contest? About Peter Sutton's 'The Politics of Suffering: Indigenous Policy in Australia since the 1970s' and Gillian Cowlishaw's replies. " Australian Aboriginal Studies. 43(8).
- SCHWAB, R.G (2007) "Sutton, Peter. Native title in Australia: an ethnographic perspective. xxiii, 279 pp., map, figs, bibliogr. Cambridge: Univ. Press, 2004." Journal of the Royal Anthropological Institute Volume 13. Pages 504–505.
- WEINER, James F (2007) "Anthropology vs. Ethnography in Native Title: A Review Article in the Context of Peter Sutton's Native Title in Australia". The Asia Pacific Journal of Anthropology. Volume 8, Number 2. Pages 151 – 168

== Filmography ==
- MacDOUGALL, David (1980), Familiar Places, Australian Institute of Aboriginal Studies. 53' (filmed in 1977)
- MacDOUGALL, David (1980), Narrator and anthropological advisor for Familiar Places: a film about Aboriginal ties to land. Director: David MacDougall. Canberra: AIAS 1980. Colour, 53 minutes. A film from the Aurukun project.
- Aboriginal art: conserving, exhibiting, interpreting. Part d of Video 4 of the series Talking about Aboriginal art. Videotaped lecture by Peter Sutton. University of Sydney: Power Institute of Fine Arts, 1992 (original forum 1990). Producers: P. Lipscombe, D. Roberts & C. Willing. Colour, 18 mins.
- Assisted with the production of Dhuway: An Australian Diaspora and Homecoming. Producer and Director: Lew Griffiths. Canberra: Oziris Productions 1995. Colour, 60 minutes.
