= Wik Ompom =

Aboriginal Australian people

The Wikampama, also known as Wik Ompom, are an Aboriginal Australian people of Cape York Peninsula in northern Queensland.

== Country ==
According to Norman Tindale, the Wikampama occupied around 1,200 square miles (3,100 km^{2}) of land around the Middle Archer River, extending northwards to the Watson River.

== Alternative names ==
Alternative names included, according to Tindale:

- Kokiala (toponym for a creek)
- Kokala
