= Pickaninny Buttes =

Landform in San Bernardino County, California

Coordinates: 34.46333°N 116.88337°W

Pickaninny Buttes is a summit in San Bernardino County, California, in the United States. It has an elevation of 2,999 feet (914 m). The butte is composed of granite.

The name has attracted criticism from the media because it contains the ethnic slur pickaninny.
