= Wik-Ngatharr dialect =

Paman language of Queensland, Australia

Wik-Ngatharr
- Wik-Alken
- Native to: Australia
- Region: Cape York Peninsula, Queensland
- Ethnicity: Wik-Kalkan
- Native speakers: (86 cited 1981)
- Language family: Pama–Nyungan: Paman; North Cape York; Wik; Wik-Ngathan; Wik-Ngatharr

Language codes
- ISO 639-3: wik
- Glottolog: wika1238
- AIATSIS: Y51
- ELP: Wik-Ngatharr

Wik-Ngatharr, or Wik-Alken (Wik-Elken), is a Paman language spoken on the Cape York Peninsula of Queensland, Australia, by the Wik-Ngatharr people. It is a co-dialect with Wik-Ngathan, and more distantly related to the other Wik languages. In 1981 there were 86 speakers.
