= Oyala Thumotang National Park =

National park in Australia

- IUCN category II (national park)
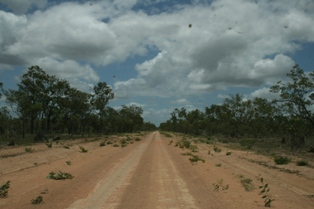
- Park track

- Location within Queensland
- Location: Queensland
- Nearest city: Coen
- Coordinates: 13°28′54″S 142°16′42″E
- Area: 4,570 km^{2} (1,760 sq mi)
- Established: 1994
- Governing body: Queensland Parks and Wildlife Service
- Website: https://parks.qld.gov.au/parks/oyala-thumotang

Oyala Thumotang, formerly Mungkan Kandju National Park (and prior to that Archer Bend National Park), is a national park in Queensland, Australia, 1,914 kilometres (1,189 mi) northwest of Brisbane.

== History ==
The Oyala Thumotang National Park encompasses what was formerly the lands of the Wik Mungkan, Southern Kaanju and Ayapathu Aboriginal peoples. The formation of the original national park was closely linked to the significant court case of Koowarta v Bjelke-Petersen decided in the High Court of Australia.

== Location ==
The park is located in central Cape York Peninsula. It is about 25 km north of Coen. It is 12 hrs by road north of Cairns. The park occupies 381,000 hectares from the McIlwraith Range foothills in the east to the Archer River in the west. The Archer and the Coen rivers flow through the park.

== Vegetation ==
The park has open eucalypt woodlands, melaleuca swamps and areas of rainforest.

== Camping ==
There are 14 camp sites near rivers and waterholes in the park. There is an entry fee. Drinking water is not available in the camping sites, so visitors need to carry their own water.

== See also ==
- Koowarta v Bjelke-Petersen
- Protected areas of Queensland
