= Bruce Pascoe =

Australian writer (born 1947)

- Pascoe in 2026
- Born: 1947 (age 78–79); Richmond, Victoria, Australia
- Education: University of Melbourne (BEd)
- Occupation: Writer
- Spouse(s): ? (?–1982); Lyn Harwood (1982– )
- Children: 2
- Writing career
- Genres: Australian fiction, poetry
- Subject: Australian Indigenous history
- Notable works: Fog a Dox (2012); Dark Emu (2014)
- Notable awards: List of awards: Fellowship of Australian Writers Literature Award (1999); Prime Minister's Literary Award for Young Adult Fiction (2013); The Deadlys Published book of the year (2013); New South Wales Premier's Literary Award for Book of the Year (2016); New South Wales Premier's Indigenous Writers' Prize (2016); Dreamtime Person of the Year (2018); Australia Council for the Arts Lifetime Achievement Award (2018)

Bruce Pascoe (born 1947) is an Australian writer of literary fiction, non-fiction, poetry, essays and children's literature. As well as his own name, Pascoe has written under the pen names Murray Gray and Leopold Glass. Pascoe identifies as Aboriginal. Since August 2020, he has been Enterprise Professor in Indigenous Agriculture at the University of Melbourne.

Pascoe is best known for his work Dark Emu: Black Seeds: Agriculture or Accident? (2014), in which he argues that traditional Aboriginal and Torres Strait Islander peoples engaged in agriculture, engineering and permanent building construction, and that their practices provide possible models for future sustainable development in Australia.

== Early life and education ==
Pascoe was born in Richmond, Victoria in 1947. He grew up in a poor working-class family; his father, Alf, was a carpenter, and his mother, Gloria Pascoe, went on to win a gold medal in lawn bowls at the 1980 Arnhem Paralympics. Pascoe spent his early years on King Island where his father worked at the tungsten mine. His family moved to Mornington, Victoria, when he was 10 years old, and then two years later moved to the Melbourne suburb of Fawkner. He attended the local state school before completing his secondary education at University High School, where his sister had won an academic scholarship. Pascoe went on to attend the University of Melbourne, initially studying commerce but then transferring to Melbourne State College. After graduating with a Bachelor of Education, he was posted to a small township near Shepparton. He later taught at Bairnsdale for nine years.

== Career ==
While on leave from his teaching career, Pascoe bought a 300-hectare (740-acre) mixed farming property and occasionally worked as an abalone fisherman. In his spare time he began writing short stories, poetry and newspaper articles.

In 1982 he moved back to Melbourne and sought to publish a journal of short stories. He came into conflict with existing publishers and instead decided to form his own company, raising A$10,000 in capital with his friend Lorraine Phelan. He ran Pascoe Publishing and Seaglass Books with his wife, Lyn Harwood.

From 1982 to 1998 Pascoe edited and published a new quarterly magazine of short fiction, Australian Short Stories, which published all forms of short stories by both established and new writers, including Helen Garner, Gillian Mears and Tim Winton. The first issue came close to selling out its initial print run of 20,000.

The main character in his 1988 novel Fox is a fugitive, searching for his Aboriginal identity and home. The book deals with issues such as Aboriginal deaths in custody, discrimination and land rights, as well as blending Aboriginal traditions with contemporary life and education.

Convincing Ground: Learning to Fall in Love with Your Country (2007), whose title is drawn from the Convincing Ground massacre, examines historical documents and eyewitness accounts of incidents in Australian history and ties them in with the "ongoing debates about identity, dispossession, memory and community". It is described in the publisher's blurb as a book "for all Australians, as an antidote to the great Australian inability to deal respectfully with the nation's constructed Indigenous past".

Pascoe featured in the award-winning documentary series which aired on SBS Television in 2008, First Australians, has been Director of Commonwealth Australian Studies project for the Commonwealth Schools Commission, and has worked extensively on preserving the Wathaurong language, producing a dictionary of the language.

Fog a Dox, a story for young adults, won the Prime Minister's Literary Awards in 2013 and was shortlisted for the 2013 Western Australian Premier's Book Awards (Young Adult category) and the 2013 Deadly Awards (Published Book of the Year category). Judges for the PM's Award commented that "The author's Aboriginality shines through but he wears it lightly...", in a story which incorporates Indigenous cultural knowledge.

=== Dark Emu (2014) ===
Dark Emu: Black Seeds: Agriculture or Accident?, first published in 2014, challenges the claim that pre-colonial Australian Aboriginal peoples were only hunter-gatherers. Pascoe argues that his examination of early settler accounts and other sources provides evidence of agriculture, aquaculture, engineering and villages of permanent housing in traditional Aboriginal societies. The book won Book of the Year at the NSW Premier's Literary Awards, and was widely praised for popularising past research on the sophistication of Aboriginal economies. The book also attracted controversy. A favourable review of its cultural implications in the academic online magazine The Conversation touched off a debate there about Pascoe's use of his historical sources. A second edition, entitled Dark Emu: Aboriginal Australia and the Birth of Agriculture was published in mid-2018, and a version of the book for younger readers, entitled Young Dark Emu: A Truer History, was published in 2019. The 2019 version was shortlisted for the 2020 Adelaide Festival Awards for Literature in the Children's Literature Award section.

The success of Dark Emu and Young Dark Emu prompted a book-length critique by Peter Sutton and Keryn Walshe who argue that Pascoe selectively quotes sources and misinterprets archaeological and anthropological evidence to draw conclusions which give a misleading view of Aboriginal societies.

In October 2019 it was announced that a documentary film of Dark Emu would be made for television by Blackfella Films, co-written by Pascoe with Jacob Hickey, directed by Erica Glynn and produced by Darren Dale and Belinda Mravicic.

=== Later work and other roles ===
In September 2015, in a collaboration with Poets House in New York, a recording of six First Nations Australia Writers Network members reading their work was presented at a special event, which was recorded. Pascoe was one of the readers, along with Jeanine Leane, Dub Leffler, Melissa Lucashenko, Jared Thomas and Ellen van Neerven.

Pascoe was appointed Enterprise Professor in Indigenous Agriculture at the University of Melbourne in September 2020, in a role "within the School of Agriculture and Food,... designed to build knowledge and understanding of Indigenous agriculture within the Faculty and to grow engagement and research activities in this area".

Pascoe is a Country Fire Authority volunteer. He battled the 2019–20 bushfires near Mallacoota. In January 2020, he went to New South Wales to help out there, before returning to Mallacoota. He cancelled his scheduled appearances at a Perth Festival event in February and at the Adelaide Writers' Week in March, to remain in East Gippsland to assess the damage done to his Mallacoota property, and to assist his community in the recovery effort in the aftermath of the bushfires.

== Aboriginal identity ==
Pascoe began identifying as Koori by age 40 after tracing distant Aboriginal ancestors from the Palawa, Bunurong, and Yuin peoples. He acknowledges his majority Cornish ancestry but maintains deep Aboriginal cultural and community connections. He has written about the complexities of identity and that people, like him, who did not grow up aware of their Aboriginal background could not experience or understand the discrimination and disadvantage that other Aboriginal people face. Pascoe has written that his, and many people's Aboriginal ancestry, was intentionally buried by previous generations due to social stigma.

=== Dispute over identity ===
Pascoe's identity has been publicly disputed, which he attributes to political attempts to discredit Dark Emu. He responded to the Boonwurrung Land and Sea Council's rejection of his connection to the Bunurong, saying his connection was through the Tasmanian family, not through Central Victorian Bunurong. The Aboriginal Land Council of Tasmania does not accept Pascoe's claims of Aboriginal Tasmanian heritage. Its chairman Michael Mansell, a Palawa, writes that Pascoe provides "no names, no direct statement about from whom he gets Aboriginal heritage".

Others who have disputed Pascoe's claim of Aboriginal identity include Yuin Indigenous affairs advocate Warren Mundine, and historian Geoffrey Blainey. Mundine and Blainey say that genealogical research indicates Pascoe's ancestors are from England.

Conversely he has been supported in his Aboriginal identity claim by other Aboriginal leaders based largely on his cultural contributions. Among these are scholar Marcia Langton, former Minister for Indigenous Australians Ken Wyatt and Yuin Elder Uncle Max Dulumunmun Harrison. His identity is also recognised institutionally; he was awarded the 2016 NSW Premier's Indigenous Writers' Prize, and holds professorial appointments in Indigenous studies at the University of Melbourne and UTS.

== Awards ==
- 1999: Fellowship of Australian Writers – Australian Literature Award for Shark, joint winner (with David Foster).
- 2013: Prime Minister's Literary Award – Young Adult Fiction.
- 2013: Deadly Awards – Published book of the year.
- 2016: NSW Premier's Literary Award for Dark Emu
- 2016: New South Wales Premier's Literary Awards – Indigenous Writers' Prize.
- 2018: Australia Council for the Arts – Lifetime Achievement Award.
- 2020: Children's Book of the Year Award, Eve Pownall Award for Information Books for Young Dark Emu.
- 2021: Australian Society of Authors – ASA Medal.

Pascoe was nominated as Person of the Year at the National Dreamtime Awards 2018, and was also invited by Yuin elder Max Dulumunmum Harrison to a special cultural ceremony lasting several days. In the same year he presented "Mother Earth" for the Eric Rolls Memorial Lecture.

== Personal life ==
In 1982, Pascoe separated from a woman he had married after graduating from college. They have a daughter. In the same year, he married Lyn Harwood. They have a son. In 2017, Pascoe and Harwood separated. According to Pascoe, the split was due to his many absences and his late-life mission to pursue farming.

Pascoe lives on a 60-hectare (150-acre) farm, Yumburra, near Mallacoota in East Gippsland, on the eastern coast of Victoria. He is also working for his family-run company, Black Duck Foods, which is aiming to produce the type of Indigenous produce mentioned in Dark Emu on a commercial scale. His 2024 book is titled Black Duck – A Year at Yumburra.

== Works ==
The following list is a selection of the 182 items by Pascoe as listed on Austlit as of December 2019:

- A Corner Full of Characters, Blackstone Press, 1981, ISBN 0959387005
- Night Animals, Penguin Books, 1986, ISBN 9780140087420
- Fox, McPhee Gribble/Penguin books, 1988, ISBN 9780140114089
- Ruby-eyed Coucal, Magabala Books, 1996, ISBN 9781875641291
- Wathaurong : Too bloody strong : Stories and life journeys of people from Wathaurong, Pascoe Publishing, 1997, ISBN 0947087311
- Cape Otway: Coast of secrets (1997)
- Shark, Magabala Books, 1999, ISBN 9781875641482
- Nightjar, Seaglass Books, 2000, ISBN 9780947087357
- Earth, Magabala Books, 2001, ISBN 1875641610
- Ocean, Bruce Sims Books, 2002, ISBN 9780957780064
- Foxies in a Firehose : A piece of doggerel from Warragul, Seaglass Books, 2006, ISBN 0947087362
- Bloke. Penguin Books Limited. 3 August 2009. ISBN 978-0-85796-558-5.
- Convincing Ground: Learning to Fall in Love with Your Country. Aboriginal Studies Press. 2007. ISBN 978-0-85575-549-2.
- The Little Red Yellow Black Book : An introduction to indigenous Australia, Aboriginal Studies Press, 2008, ISBN 9780855756154
- Fog a Dox, Magabala Books, 2012, ISBN 9781922142597
- Dark Emu: Black Seeds: Agriculture Or Accident?, Magabala Books, 2014, ISBN 9781922142436
- Seahorse, Magabala Books, 2015, ISBN 9781921248931
- Mrs Whitlam, Magabala Books, 2016, ISBN 9781925360240
- Young Dark Emu: A Truer History, Magabala Books, 2019, ISBN 9781925360844
- Salt: Selected Stories and Essays, Black Inc, 2019, ISBN 9781760641580
- Black Duck – A Year at Yumburra, with Lyn Harwood, Thames & Hudson, 2024, ISBN 978-1-76076-311-4

He has also written under the names Murray Gray (The Great Australian Novel: At Last it's Here, a 1984 satirical novel) and Leopold Glass (Ribcage: All You Need Is $800,000 – Quickly, a 1999 detective novel).
