= Wik Me'anh =

Aboriginal Australian people

The Wikmean people, also spelt Wik Me'an, are an Aboriginal Australian people, one of the Wik peoples of the Cape York Peninsula of northern Queensland.

== Country ==
The territory of the Wikmean consisted of an estimated 600 square miles (1,600 km^{2}), inland from Cape Keerweer.
