= Kendall River (Queensland) =

Kendall
- Location of Kendall River mouth in Queensland
- Etymology: In honour of Thomas Kendall

Location
- Country: Australia
- State: Queensland
- Region: Far North Queensland

Physical characteristics
- Source: Great Dividing Range
  - location: northwest of Bally Junction
  - elevation: 154 m (505 ft)
- Mouth: confluence with the Holroyd River
  - location: near the Kulinchin Outstation
  - coordinates: 14°12′21″S 141°37′39″E
  - elevation: 3 m (9.8 ft)
- Length: 167 km (104 mi)
- Basin size: 4,851 km^{2} (1,873 sq mi)

The Kendall River is a river in Far North Queensland, Australia.

The headwaters of the river rise in the Great Dividing Range and flows in a south westerly direction through mostly uninhabited country across Cape York Peninsula. It eventually discharges into the Holroyd River near the Kulinchin Outstation and then onto the Gulf of Carpentaria.

The river has a catchment area of 4,851 square kilometres (1,873 sq mi), of which an area of 93 square kilometres (36 sq mi) is composed of palustrine wetlands.

== History ==
The traditional owners of the area are the Wik-Munkan and Mimungkun peoples.

Kugu Nganhcara (also known as Wik, Wiknantjara, Wik Nganychara, Wik Ngencherr) is a traditional language of the area, which includes the landscape within the local government boundaries of the Cook Shire.

The river was named by the pastoralists, Francis Lascelles Jardine and Alexander William Jardine in 1863. It was originally known as Kendall Creek and was named after a poet friend of their surveyor, Thomas Henry Kendall.

== See also ==
- List of rivers of Australia § Queensland
