= Holroyd River =

River in Far North Queensland, Australia

Holroyd
- Location of Holroyd River mouth in Queensland
- Etymology: In honour of Arthur Holroyd

Location
- Country: Australia
- State: Queensland
- Region: Far North Queensland

Physical characteristics
- Source: McIlwraith Range
  - location: below Mount White
  - elevation: 187 m (614 ft)
- Mouth: Gulf of Carpentaria
  - location: Kulinchin Outstation
  - coordinates: 14°09′54″S 141°35′44″E
  - elevation: 0 m (0 ft)
- Length: 325 km (202 mi)
- Basin size: 10,286 km^{2} (3,971 sq mi)
- Discharge
  - average: 57 m^{3}/s (2,000 cu ft/s)

Basin features
- Tributaries
  - right: Kendall River

The Holroyd River is a river on the Cape York Peninsula in Far North Queensland, Australia.

== Course and features ==
The headwaters of the river rise south of Mount White in the McIlwraith Range in the Great Dividing Range. It then flows westwards forming a series of braided channels and continuing through the uninhabited country until merging with the Kendall river near the Kulinchin Outstation and discharging into the Gulf of Carpentaria. The river is joined by eight tributaries including the Kendall River, Sandlewood Creek, Station Creek, Potlappa Creek, The Big Spring, First Spring, Christmas Creek and the Kendle River.

The catchment area of the creek occupies an 10,286 square kilometres (3,971 sq mi) of which an area of 60 square kilometres (23 sq mi) is composed of estuarine wetlands. A variety of landscapes are found within the catchment including tropical savannah woodlands, open grasslands, beach ridges, wetlands and paperbark stands.

The river has a mean annual discharge of 1,799 gigalitres (3.957×10^{11} imp gal; 4.752×10^{11} US gal).

The river was named in 1864 by the pastoralist Francis Lascelles Jardine after the explorer, doctor and politician Arthur Todd Holroyd.

The traditional owners of the area are the Wik, Bakanh, Thaayorre and Kaanju peoples who inhabited the drainage basin for thousands of years.

Kugu-Muminh is one of the traditional languages which includes the landscape within the local government boundaries of the Cook Shire.

== See also ==
- List of rivers of Australia § Queensland
