= Archer River =

River in Queensland, Australia

Archer
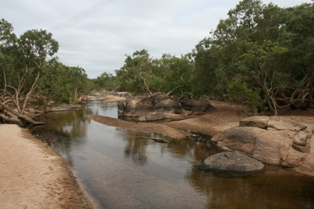
- Archer River, Cape York

- Location of Archer River mouth in Queensland

Location
- Country: Australia
- State: Queensland
- Region: Far North Queensland
- Settlement: Aurukun

Physical characteristics
- Source: McIlwraith Range
  - location: north of Coen
  - elevation: 138 m (453 ft)
- Mouth: Gulf of Carpentaria
  - location: Archer Bay
  - coordinates: 13°25′12″S 141°43′9″E
  - elevation: 0 m (0 ft)
- Length: 268 km (167 mi)
- Basin size: 13,820 km^{2} (5,340 sq mi)
- Discharge
  - average: 222 m^{3}/s (7,800 cu ft/s)

Basin features
- Tributaries
  - left: Coen River
  - right: The Dry River
- National park: Oyala Thumotang National Park

The Archer River is a river on the Cape York Peninsula, Far North Queensland, Australia.

== Course and features ==
The headwaters of the river rise in the McIlwraith Range and it flows west, traversing tropical savanna plains and wetlands, flowing through Piccaninny Plains Sanctuary and Oyala Thumotang National Park, and enters the Archer Bay in the Gulf of Carpentaria on the western side of the peninsula near the town of Aurukun along with the Watson River and the Ward River.

The catchment area for the Archer River is 13,820 square kilometres (5,336 sq mi). During the wet season between November and April, the river floods, replenishing over a million hectares of wetlands. The Coen River is a tributary of the Archer River.

The river remains in a natural state with very little development and just one small dam that supplies water for the town of Coen. On 3 April 2009, Queensland Premier Anna Bligh announced the Archer River would be included under the Wild Rivers Act, 2005 (Qld). The declaration means the river's fragile ecosystems will be protected by allowing only sustainable activities within its catchment.

The river has an average discharge of 7,010 gigalitres (9.169×10^{9} cu yd) per annum.

== Flora and fauna ==
Much of the river is bordered by fig-dominated gallery rainforests, which provide habitat for animals such as the white-tailed rat, spotted cuscus and palm cockatoo. Toothless catfish are found in the river.

A total of 45 species of fish have been found in the river, including the glassfish, barred grunter, silver cobbler, fly-specked hardyhead, mouth almighty, goby, barramundi, oxeye herring, eastern rainbowfish, bony bream, gulf saratoga, giant gudgeon, freshwater longtom and seven-spot archerfish.

== History ==
The traditional owners of the area are the Wik, Kaantju and Wikampama peoples.

The river was named in 1865 by Francis Lascelles Jardine and Alexander Jardine during an expedition through the area. They named the river after the Archer brothers of Gracemere in Rockhampton. The river had probably been named Dubbelde Ree by Willem Jansz in 1606 and later named Coen River by Jan Carstensz in 1623 and then named Peach River by Robert Logan Jack in 1879.

== See also ==
- List of rivers of Australia § Queensland
