= Wik languages =

Group of Australian Aboriginal languages

Wik
- Middle Paman
- Geographic distribution: Cape York Peninsula, Queensland
- Ethnicity: Wik peoples
- Linguistic classification: Pama–Nyungan: Paman; North Cape York; Wik
- Subdivisions: Wik-Ngathan; Wik-Me'nh; Wik-Mungkan; Kugu-Muminh; Ayabadhu; Pakanha

Language codes
- Glottolog: wika1239 (Wik proper) paka1251 (Pakanha) wikn1246 (Kugu-Muminh)
- Wik languages (green) among other Pama–Nyungan (tan)

The Wik languages are a subdivision of the Paman languages consisting of sixteen languages, all spoken on the Cape York Peninsula of Queensland, Australia. This grouping was first proposed by R. M. W. Dixon.

Each of the Kugu-Muminh dialects may have the prefix Wik- instead of Kugu-. Wik Paach is not a Wik language despite its name.

The languages are as follows; often various dialects are considered separate languages:

- Wik
  - Wik-Ngathan (incl. Wik-Ngatharr dialect)
  - Wik-Me'nh
  - Wik-Mungkan
  - Wik-Ompoma (Ambama) †
  - Kugu Nganhcara (incl. Gugu Uwanh dialect) †
  - Ayabadhu †
  - Pakanha †

The Flinders Island language and Barrow Point language were apparently Wik.

== See also ==
- Wik peoples
- Wik Peoples v Queensland
