= Aurukun, Queensland =

Aurukun
- Town
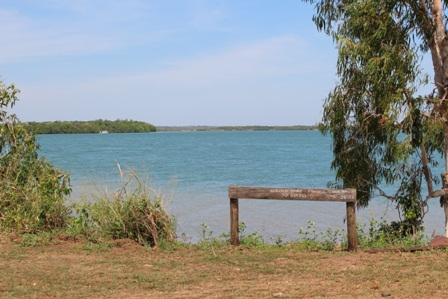
- Aurukun, 2014

- Interactive map of Aurukun
- Coordinates: 13.3584°S 141.7280°E
- Country: Australia
- State: Queensland
- LGAs: Aurukun; Cook
- Location: 207 km (129 mi) SSW of Weipa; 659 km (409 mi) NW of Cooktown; 828 km (514 mi) NW of Cairns; 2,482 km (1,542 mi) NNW of Brisbane

Government
  - State electorate: Cook
  - Federal division: Leichhardt

Area
  - Total: 7,407.7 km^{2} (2,860.1 sq mi)

Population
  - Total: 1,101 (2021 census)
  - Density: 0.14863/km^{2} (0.38495/sq mi)
- Time zone: UTC+10:00 (AEST)
- Postcode: 4892
- County: Kendell County, Queensland

Aurukun /ærəˈkuːn/ is a town and coastal locality in the Shire of Aurukun and the Shire of Cook in Far North Queensland, Australia. It is an Indigenous community. In the 2021 census, the locality of Aurukun had a population of 1,101 people, of whom 997 (88.7%) identified as Aboriginal or Torres Strait Islander people.

== Geography ==
Aurukun is situated approximately 100 kilometres (62 mi) south of Weipa. The town faces west to the Gulf of Carpentaria, and during the wet season, roads are extremely hard to drive on.

The area is rich in bauxite.

== History ==
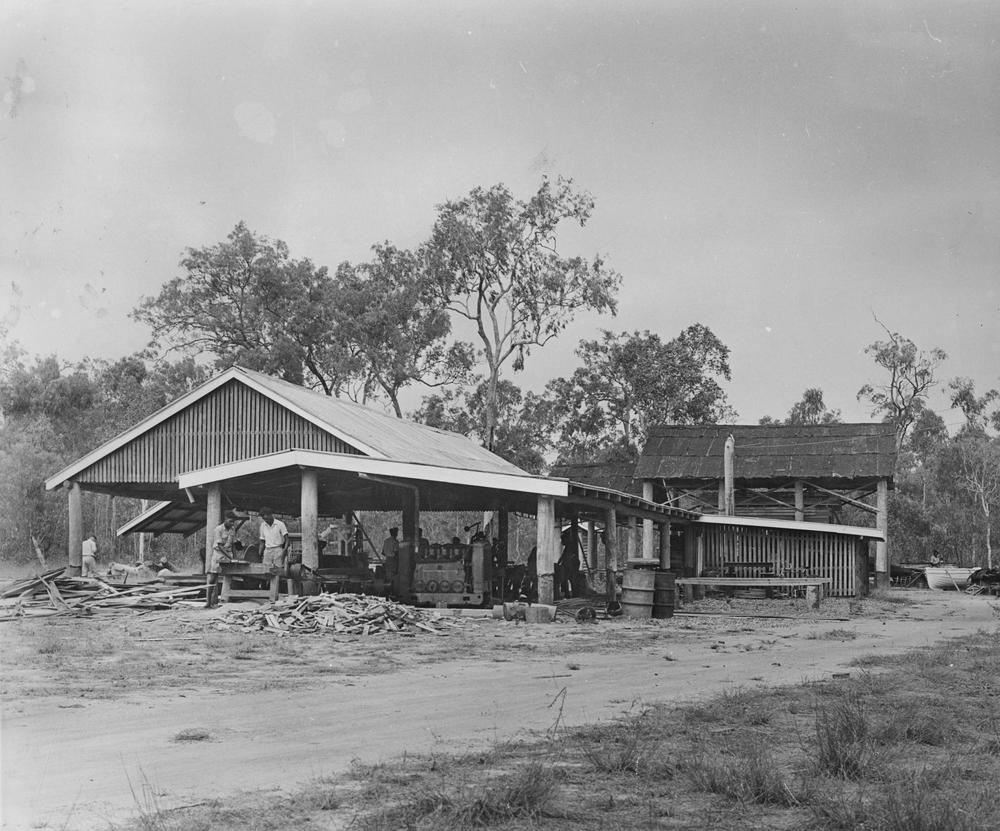
Aurukun sawmill, circa 1950

Kugu Mu'inh (also known as Wik Muinh, Kuku Muinh, Wik Muin, Kuku-Mu'inh) is a traditional language of the area which includes landscape within the local government boundaries of the Cook Shire.

The first recorded contact between Europeans and Aboriginal Australians was near Aurukun on the Janszoon voyage of 1605–06.

The Aurukun Mission (known then as the Archer River Mission Station) was established on 4 August 1904 for the Presbyterian Church of Australia by the Reverend Arthur and Mrs Mary Richter, two Moravian missionaries and managed under the provisions of the Queensland Aboriginals Protection and Restriction of the Sale of Opium Act 1897. Aboriginal people were relocated from a large surrounding area, many against their will, to the mission settlement. Aurukun was "ruled" for 40 years by Reverend William Mackenzie, as the missions Chief Protector for the Aboriginal Protection Board. The town once had a cattle station, sawmill, butcher and bakery.

The settlement was expanded in 1922 to include Kendall River

The town was eventually called Aurukun, which is the Aboriginal name of a lagoon on the Watson River

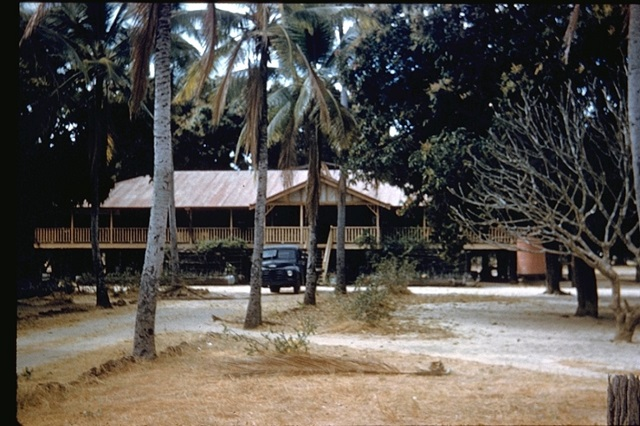
Superintendent's residence at Aurukun, circa 1959-1960

Under the missionaries, children were confined to dormitories although they returned to their families during the vacations. Young adults were trained for servile work. MacKenzie's punishments were described as "harsh, unorthodox, and arbitrary - they included the use of banishment, corporal punishment, including flogging and beating, use of his fists, use of the 'electro magnet', binding the mouth to stop verbal abuse and swearing." In 1956, Victor and Isobel Wolmby were exiled from the camp because Victor had fathered a child with another woman. Victor was to become recognised as a leader and Isobel became a source of the group's verbal history.

However, many people remained outside the mission up until the 1950s.

Aurukun Post Office opened on 1 July 1972.

Wik woman Alison Woolla was the first female mayor of Aurukun, serving from 1983 to 1985, and again 1991–1994. She was largely responsible for establishing a women's shelter in the community, and was honoured by having an award named after her in 2020 (see below).

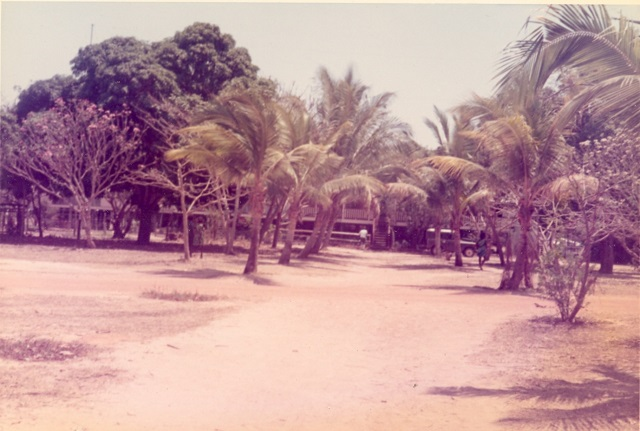
Aurukun Presbyterian Mission House, October 1973

In 1978, the Queensland government decided to take over the administration of both the Aurukun and Mornington Island missions. Both communities were against this, and protested, seeking the help of the Federal government. After lengthy negotiations, legislation for self-management of the two reserves was introduced into federal parliament and the Aboriginal and Torres Strait Islanders (Queensland Reserves and Communities Self Management) Act 1978 was passed on 7 April 1978. Further negotiations took place between State and Federal Ministers and on 22 May 1978, the Local Government (Aboriginal Lands) Act 1978 came into force, giving a 50-year lease to the Shire of Aurukun to be trustee for the land within the boundaries, with an elected Aboriginal Council. Aurukun and Mornington Shire remain the only Aboriginal communities in Queensland constituted as local authorities.

Following the Wik Peoples v Queensland determination in December 1996, the land reverted to native title held by the Wik people. The focal area of the Wik lies between the Archer and Edward Rivers of Western Cape York Peninsula and inland to Coen. Most Wik people still live in this triangle.

=== 21st century ===
In December 2007, nine Aurukun males received probation and other light sentences after being found guilty of raping a ten-year-old girl. The mild sentences received international condemnation and were the catalyst for a review of sexual abuse sentencing in Queensland Indigenous communities. In March 2008, it was widely reported that standards of justice, education and child safety had collapsed in Aurukun, and that the local community justice group had called for children to be removed from the town for their own safety and wellbeing.

Aurukun is home to a plethora of Aboriginal groups. As of 2013 there were some 50 to 60 families from five major clan groups.

On 1 January 2020, Aurukun was rocked by a stabbing death and a riot involving over 250 people, in which a number of houses were burned down. It is believed that alcohol illegally brought into the alcohol-free community was a contributing factor in the violence. One fifth of the town's population fled to avoid the violence, with 110 sheltering in bushland outside the town and 120 fleeing to the town of Coen 300 kilometres (190 mi) away. By 21 January 2020 there were still 280 residents unwilling to return to the town, and emergency dog food was flown into Aurukun to feed the 70 dogs abandoned by those who had not returned. Some staff members of the Aurukun Shire Council resigned their positions, unwilling to return to the community.

In July 2020, the Local Government Association of Queensland's Alison Woolla Memorial Award was created, to "acknowledges those individuals who are making a significant, local contribution to awareness and prevention of domestic and family violence". The inaugural award, which went to Pormpuraaw women Myrtle Foote and May Ballie in October 2020, was presented by Woolla's daughter Keri Tamwoy, Mayor of Aurukun.

== Demographics ==
In the 2006 census, the locality of Aurukun had a population of 1,044 people.

In the 2016 census, the locality of Aurukun had a population of 1,269 people, including 1,147 Aboriginal and Torres Strait Islander people. 95.8% of people were born in Australia. 10.6% of people only spoke English at home. Other languages spoken at home included Cape York Peninsula languages 61.6% and Wik Mungkan 14.7%. The most common responses for religion were Uniting Church 44.3%, No Religion 29.3% and Presbyterian and Reformed 11.0%.

In the 2021 census, the locality of Aurukun had a population of 1,101 people, of whom 997 (88.7%) identified as Aboriginal or Torres Strait Islander people.

== Education ==
Aurukun has a primary school which is operated by Cape York Aboriginal Australian Academy (CYAAA) in a unique partnership with Education Queensland. The school opened on 29 January 1974 and caters for students from pre-prep to year 7. The school remains the only school in Aurukun. Classroom instruction is dedicated to teaching mainstream curriculum in English literacy and numeracy using Direct Instruction. The Direct Instruction method focuses on individual student outcomes, repetition and weekly tests with the aim to ensure students are mastering literacy and numeracy basics. Students are also taught a comprehensive Indigenous culture and language program which aims to give children fluency in their own cultures and enjoy the best of both worlds. The school provides an extended school day which involves artistic, musical and sports programs (in partnership with national bodies) which aims to give children increased confidence and socially prepare them for moving between homelands, work and study in the wider world.

In 2008, one in three children were not enrolled for primary school. Following welfare reform trials introduced in July 2008, school attendance had risen from an average of 37% to 63% in September 2009.

Following incidents where teachers and the principal were threatened, rocks were thrown at their housing, and children as young as six tried to steal a car, all teachers were evacuated from the school in May 2016. As a result, the school was closed for six weeks with only distance education programs being continued. The incidents have drawn the effectiveness of the Direct Instruction method into question, and as of July 2016 the Queensland Government is implementing an Australian curriculum into the school alongside Direct Instruction.

== Facilities ==
=== Health ===
The Aurukun Primary Health Care Centre is run in partnership by Torres and Cape Health Service and Apunipima Cape York Health Council, a community controlled Aboriginal Medical Service. Doctors conduct clinics 5 days each week, with other visiting specialists regularly conducting outreach clinics. Emergencies are flown to Cairns by the RFDS. The clinic is open 365 days a year, with nurses covering after hours for emergencies.

Aurukun Shire Council engages a qualified vet to visit every two to three months, and de-sexing of pets is free for indigenous residents.

=== Utilities ===
Electricity is supplied by Ergon (formerly FNQEB) through diesel generators supplying power 24 hours a day. Station stability is excellent, typically better than grid supplied sites.

The Water supply for Aurukun is drawn from five bores located across the town. From October 2014, fluoride was introduced to the Aurukun water supply, following public consultation.

In 2011 and 2012, the Aurukun water and sewerage services were upgraded extensively, including to replace water mains, upgrade bore facilities and install new sewerage lines.

In 2007, The Sydney Morning Herald reported that few people in Aurukun had phones. As of 2015 the community had no ADSL broadband service and receives all communications services via radio transmission towers.

=== Security ===
Aurukun is one of the most closely monitored communities in Australia. In mid-2008 34 security cameras were installed throughout the community after consultation with the Aurukun Shire Council. The cameras cover almost all areas of the township and are constantly monitored from Cairns. The cameras cost $12,000 a month to operate, which is a significant reduction from the $60,000 a month that was previously paid to a private security company to patrol the community.

=== General store ===
There is a general store called Aurukun Supermarket, which caters for all needs of the community, from the cradle (nappies) to the grave (coffins), run by Island and Cape. Not having the buying power of the large supermarkets, the group pays higher wholesale prices, and as all supplies arrive in the remote community by road, air, or sea barge, additional costs are incurred. Fresh food often has to be flown in during the wet season owing to flooded roads, so groceries are expensive. The federal government's Low-Cost Essentials Subsidy Scheme started in July 2025, which subsidises the price of around 30 basic items.

== Amenities ==
The Wik and Kugu Art Centre in Aukurun opened in 1987, making it the oldest established art centre on Cape York Peninsula. The centre has about 30 members, and artists from the Centre participate in competitions and exhibitions worldwide. Aurukun artists are famous for their sculptures, which traditionally were carved from soft woods for use in ceremony.

The Aurukun Shire Council operate the Wik Mungkan Indigenous Knowledge Centre at 39 Kang Kang Road.

Aurukun is home to a community swimming pool, and a new large basketball hall / recreational centre. There are outdoor basketball courts and a rugby field. Aurukun participates in football carnivals and softball with other communities in the Cape region every couple of months.

Aurukun Uniting Church is at 502 Kang Kang Street (corner Themp Street, 13.3548°S 141.7295°E).

== Attractions ==
Bushwalking, fishing and some camping are the dominant pursuits for tourists visiting. Visitors are required to apply for a permit from the Aurukun Shire Council prior to entering the community.

Possum Creek is a swimming hole 30 kilometres (19 mi) west of the town. Sandy Creek is a swimming hole 40 kilometres (25 mi) from Possum Creek.

Emu Creek is a 4wd track 37 kilometres (23 mi) to the old road turn off and then 80 kilometres (50 mi) of bush track. Aurukun landing is 1.5 kilometres (0.93 mi) from town and provides access to Archer River (crocodiles present). Umban is a 4wd camping ground just under two hrs drive.

== Alcohol ban ==
In 1978, the community was without a canteen and most of the locals wanted it to stay that way but the Queensland government pushed for one. It coincided with the imposition of a local council to open up the land to mining hitherto opposed by the community. When social problems ensued the government used it as justification for intervention.

However, by 2009, Aurukun Council introduced an alcohol management plan to the community which completely banned alcohol. A previous alcohol management plan had restricted drinking at the Tavern to three hours each day. Aurukun is one of 19 communities across Queensland with alcohol restrictions in place. The Aurukun alcohol ban has been unable to rid the community of alcohol completely, and has spurred some black-market "sly-grogging".

== See also ==
- Aurukun Airport
- Wik Peoples v Queensland - makes reference to Aurukun.
