= Luthigh =

Indigenous Australian people

The Lotiga, also known as the Okara, were an Indigenous Australian people of the Cape York Peninsula of North Queensland.

== Country ==
Lotiga country, calculated to extend over some 400 square miles (1,000 km^{2}), was situated around the upper Dulhunty tributary of the Ducie river and McDonnell Telegraph Station, between the Paterson and Moreton stations on the Cape York Telegraph Line.

== People ==
Ursula McConnel suggested that the Okara tribe mentioned by Lauriston Sharp, as belonging to the Jathaikana type of social organization, might be the same as the Lotiga. Norman Tindale equated the two on the basis of McConnel's provisory conjecture.

== Alternative names ==
- Okara (?)
- Oharra

== Sources ==
- McConnel, Ursula H. (September 1939). "Social Organization of the Tribes of Cape York Peninsula, North Queensland". Oceania. 10 (1): 54–72. doi:10.1002/j.1834-4461.1939.tb00256.x. JSTOR 40327720.
- McConnel, Ursula H. (June 1940). "Social Organization of the Tribes of Cape York Peninsula, North Queensland (Continued)". Oceania. 10 (4): 434–455. doi:10.1002/j.1834-4461.1940.tb00305.x. JSTOR 40327867.
- Parry-Okeden, William (1897). Report on the North Queensland aborigines and the native police. Edmond Gregory, government printer.
- Sharp, R. Lauriston (March 1939). "Tribes and Totemism in North-East Australia". Oceania. 9 (3): 254–275. doi:10.1002/j.1834-4461.1939.tb00232.x. JSTOR 40327744.
- Tindale, Norman Barnett (1974). "Lotiga (QLD)". Aboriginal Tribes of Australia: Their Terrain, Environmental Controls, Distribution, Limits, and Proper Names. Australian National University. ISBN 978-0-708-10741-6.
