= Lakefield =

Lakefield may refer to:

== Places ==
=== Australia ===
- Lakefield, Queensland, a coastal locality in the Shire of Cook
- Rinyirru (Lakefield) National Park in Queensland

=== Canada ===
- Lakefield, Ontario
- Lakefield, a community on the north end of Lac Dawson in south Gore, Quebec

=== Ireland ===
- Lakefield, Templeport, a townland in County Cavan, Ireland

=== United States ===
- Lakefield Township, Luce County, Michigan
- Lakefield Township, Saginaw County, Michigan
- Lakefield, Minnesota

== Other uses ==
- Lakefield, a 2001 album from Canadian music group Leahy
- Intel Lakefield, a microprocessor made by Intel based on the Tremont microarchitecture
