= List of telegraph stations =

There are numerous telegraph stations that have been important individually in the history of Australia, the United States, and other countries, and there are systems of telegraph stations that have collectively been important during the 19th century and early 20th century. In 1853, it was asserted that there were 4,000 miles of telegraph lines in Great Britain, 27,000 miles in the United States, and it was expected that 4,000 miles of telegraph lines would soon be built in India. The telegraph lines required repeater stations and/or repair stations. In addition to stations along traditional telegraph lines, there were also a number of notable wireless telegraph stations that were important for communication to and from ships.

== in Australia ==
- Alice Springs Telegraph Station, preserved in the Alice Springs Telegraph Station Historical Preserve. It was established in 1872 as one of 12 stations along the Overland Telegraph Line from Adelaide to Darwin and is the best preserved of the 12.
- Beechworth Telegraph Station, Beechworth is open as a visitor center.
- Eyre Telegraph Station, a repeater station that operated from the 1870s until 1927, on the Adelaide to Albany, Australia telegraph line
- Gawler Telegraph Station, Gawler, now a museum
- Gulgong Telegraph Station was located at 5 Robinson Street in Gulgong, New South Wales. Its location is commemorated by a reconstruction of the station that serves as a motel.
- Tennant Creek Telegraph Station

=== Cape York Overland Telegraph Line ===
- Moreton Telegraph Station
- Paterson (Cape York) Telegraph Station
- Musgrave Telegraph Station
- Mein Telegraph Station
- Coen Carrier Station
- Palmerville Telegraph Station
- Fairview Telegraph Station
- McDonnell Telegraph Station
- Walsh Telegraph Station
- Laura Telegraph Station
- Somerset Telegraph Station

== in Canada ==
Charles B. Barr published in 1853 a map of telegraph stations "in the United States, the Canadas, and Nova Scotia" which showed stations in Canada West, Canada East, Prince Edward Island, New Brunswick, and Nova Scotia.

Disturnell's 1851 map of canals, railways, telegraph lines, and stagecoach lines, shows similar detail in Canada and in the United States.

== in the United Kingdom ==
A list of telegraph stations in the United Kingdom was compiled irregularly, including in 1876, 1882, 1885, and 1889.

== in the United States ==
Charles B. Barr's 1853 map of telegraph stations "in the United States, the Canadas, and Nova Scotia" showed telegraph lines extending to the west in the U.S. as far as Alexandria, Louisiana, St. Joseph, Missouri, Muscatine, Iowa and Prairie du Chien, Wisconsin. Disturnell's 1851 map of canals, railways, telegraph lines, and stagecoach lines, shows similar detail in the United States and in Canada.

== First Transcontinental Telegraph system ==
The First Transcontinental Telegraph was a telegraph line completed in 1861 that joined the eastern United States to California. It supplanted the Pony Express. It was authorized by the Pacific Telegraph Act of 1860.

== Wireless telegraph stations ==
The Deutschland incident (1902) illustrated the value and issues with wireless telegraph stations.

A 1908 publication by the U.S. Department of the Navy listed on-shore and off-shore wireless telegraph stations of the world. It included a list of shore stations of the world (by country), a list of merchant vessels (by ship line), as well as United States Army, United States Navy, and United States Revenue Cutter Service stations and vessels. The publication was revised and reissued in 1910 and 1912.

== See also ==
- List of telephone company buildings
