= Old Laura Homestead =

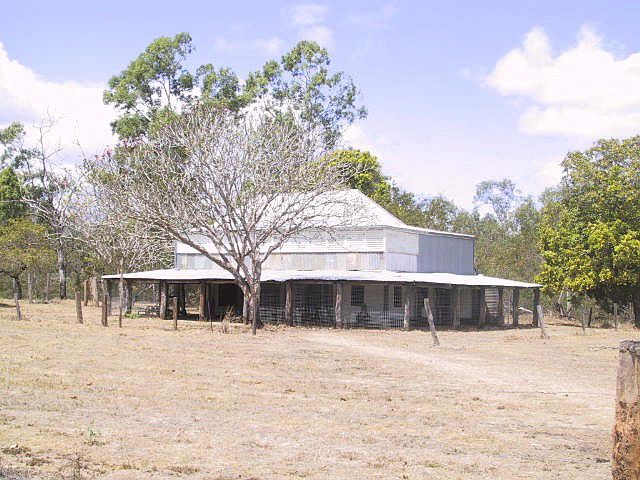
- Old Laura Homestead, 1998

- Location within Queensland Location within Australia
- 15.3454°S 144.4538°E
- Location: Rinyirru National Park, Lakefield, Shire of Cook, Queensland, Australia

History
- Design period: 1870s–1890s (late 19th century)
- Built: 1902–

Queensland Heritage Register
- Official name: Old Laura Homestead, Laura Homestead
- Type: state heritage (built, landscape)
- Designated: 28 July 2000
- Reference no.: 602210
- Significant period: 1870s–1890s (historical) ongoing (social)
- Significant components: meat house, garden/grounds, trees/plantings, yards – livestock, fencing, dip, burial ground, out building/s, shed – storage, residential accommodation – workers' quarters, residential accommodation – main house

Old Laura Homestead is a heritage-listed homestead in Rinyirru National Park, Lakefield, Shire of Cook, Queensland, Australia. It was built from 1902 onwards. It was added to the Queensland Heritage Register on 28 July 2000.

== History ==
The earliest record of an official application for a license to occupy a new run on the lower Laura River was made by Peter McDermott and Fergus O'Beirne on 14 October 1879. Occupational licenses were granted for twelve month terms and could be converted to form part of a pastoral lease once the run had been stocked to one quarter of its grazing capacity. Brixton and Fox Vale (Old Fairview) runs on the Little Laura River, Boralga Spring and the better grazing country on the Kennedy River at Lakefield and Breeza Plains, had already been occupied and unofficially stocked by this period.

McDermott and O'Beirne were cousins from Ireland who had travelled overland from Rockhampton to Cooktown where they established a butcher's business and resided. O'Beirne was accompanied by his wife, Mary, and two small children, John and Julia. Their third child, Margaret, was born in Cooktown in 1880 and was followed by four other children – Matthew, Fergus, Roderick, and Kathleen.

== Description ==
The elements that make up Old Laura Homestead include station buildings, stockyards, structural foundations and footings, native and introduced trees and vegetation, and the homestead grounds.

=== Main House ===
The main house is a two-room high-set timber-frame building clad with corrugated galvanised iron. The building is elevated on bush timber stumps of a local ironwood. Two upstairs bedrooms form a central core with enclosed verandahs on three sides. The upstairs floor is of pit-sawn boards on a pit-sawn frame. Upstairs rooms are externally clad with wide horizontal chamferboards, beaded on the inside at joints to give a narrow pattern on the interior. The rooms are internally clad with narrower horizontal boards that also form the ceiling. Internal cross-wall partitions are clad in corrugated iron on sawn timber studs. Bays of timber louvre shutters enclose the front and sides of the upstairs verandah area above the former handrail. Corrugated iron cladding has been added below the handrail. The verandah area also contains corrugated iron push-out shutters. A gable hip roof clad with corrugated iron covers the central core of the building. Roof rafters are of sapling bush timber. Original purlins are pit sawn, with some milled timber purlins introduced c. 1940 and in 1986.

The underfloor space is the main living area and is partly enclosed at the rear with kitchen, dining, storeroom and bathroom facilities that are variously clad with corrugated iron, asbestos cement and plyboard sheets. The house is surrounded by an open lean-to corrugated iron verandah that shades the front and sides of the underfloor space. The verandah awning frame is of bush timber saplings. A recent steel mesh security screen encloses the entire underfloor area at the external edge of the verandahs. A recess in the security screen at the front of the house allows visitors to view three interpretive panels containing photographs and historical information. The ground floor is of cement. The house is equipped with a corrugated iron water tank on a concrete base, and also with an underground septic tank. The house is wired for DC generator power with lighting.

=== Workshop and Saddle Shed ===
The alignment of the outbuildings varies slightly from the main house to match the alignment of the adjacent yards.

The workshop and saddle shed combine to form a large covered work space to serve a number of functions – garage, workshop, stables and saddle shed. A feature of these buildings is the use of corrugated iron bow roofs. The workshop is constructed of heavy bush timber uprights and bearers supporting the central bow-roof section, descending to skillion roof sections on each side of the shed. The building, which was used at various times as a workshop, garage, storeroom and living quarters; is open except on the eastern side where corrugated iron partitions form two lock-up rooms fitted with sawn timber storage shelves and corrugated iron push-out shutters. The floor for the storerooms is of concrete. The remainder of the building has an earth floor. Timber shelves for tools and spare parts extend along one wall. The interior of the workshop also retains a heavy timber anvil stand. A low-set timber tank stand is located at the southern end of the workshop adjacent to the horse yard site. As Laura station covers mainly black soil and sandy country the stock horses did not require shoeing. There has not been a smithy for shoeing at the homestead since the early 1940s.

The adjoining saddle shed is similarly built with bush timber uprights and top plates, though of lighter construction. Roof rafters and purlins are of milled timber. The shed is covered with a shallow bow- roof central core with lean-to roofs on all four sides. The shed is open on all sides. The shed was at times used as stables for the manager's and owner's race horses during the 1950s and 1960s. Timber racks for the storage of harness and saddles are keyed into the uprights. Many of the racks have been removed. A timber 44 imperial gallons (200 L; 53 US gal) drum rack for the storage of molasses and fuel drums is located at the rear of the saddle shed.

=== Meat House ===
A small building of conventional meat house design with an enclosed butchering room at the core, shaded on all four sides by an overhanging pyramidal roof. The building is supported by bush timber uprights and top plates of local ironwood. Roof rafters and purlins are of milled timber. The lower walls of the butchering room are clad with corrugated iron on a milled timber frame. The upper sections are enclosed with flyproof wire gauze. The interior of the room is dominated by a large tree-trunk chopping block. A high-set bush timber bench for curing salt corn beef is located outside the room under the verandah roof. The floor of the meat house is of cement and the floor under the verandah is of antbed and cement.

=== Stockmen's Quarters ===
A small building supported by early bush timber uprights and top plates. The building was almost completely rebuilt in 1986 using new milled timber and new bush timber saplings as rafters. A new iron roof and a wall were added. The corrugated iron walls with push-out shutters survive from the original construction. Existing doors and internal partitions are of recent construction. The floor of the quarters is of cement with cement haunching around the base of the iron to stop the entry of snakes. Three Aboriginal families, including two with children, were living in the quarters during the 1960s.

About 30 metres (98 ft) north of the stockmen's quarters is the site of a demolished building that contained a concrete floor and corrugated iron walls and roof. This building accommodated up to six families of Aboriginal stockmen during the 1940s and 1950s. In 1960 the building was converted into a white stockmen's quarters, and by the late 1960s it became an ablutions block. The building was bulldozed post 1979 and the floor is still evident as a pile of broken concrete north of the site.

=== Stockyards and Dip ===
The homestead contains an extensive set of horse and stock working yards which demonstrate a continuous process of adaptation, replacement and repair over the span of the station's operating life. The sections of the yards for handling horses are located at the eastern end closest to the saddle shed. The horse yards include a round breaking-in yard. The cattle killing yard with a ruined butchering gallows is also located in this section, close to the meat house.

The central core of the cattle yards comprises crushes for de-horning, cutting, drafting, dipping, and branding. Surrounding the stock working facilities of the central core, are the receiving, forcing and holding yards. The de-horning and cutting crush, cattle dip and stock loading ramp are in better condition than most sections of the yards, possibly through having remained in use and repair until the closure of the station. The loading ramp was built in the early 1960s and is the most recent structure. The most substantial feature of the yards is the cattle dip, which is of the conventional design and construction. The dip was built during the O'Beirne's tenure and is the earliest surviving structure within the yards. The walls of the dip are of concrete with concrete rendered steps and pit. Bush timber uprights and rafters support a corrugated iron roof that covers the dip itself. Steps lead out of the dip to a concrete-surfaced draining and pound yard. Beyond the dip is a large circular holding yard over 50 metres (160 ft) in diameter which forms a significant feature of the stockyards.

The stockyards are mostly constructed of local Cooktown Ironwood posts keyed for five rail panels. Many of the keyed rails have over the years been damaged or removed and replaced with rails that are hitched to the posts with fencing wire. A number of different configurations are evident with the use and re-use of timber fence rails. An early and significant section of panels is located at the northern end of the large tailing, or cooling, yard alongside the present access track where several heavy ironwood posts still stand. The posts are toggled and keyed for quick removal and replacement of rails. The unchecked actions of termites and the introduction of fire management practices in recent years have made it more difficult to understand the chronology of the changes that have occurred in the stockyards.

=== Milking Yards and Dairy ===
These yards form a part of the domestic precinct at the eastern end of the homestead area and are separated from the stockyards by the main house and grounds. It is difficult to fully understand the former layout of the milking yards because of recent fire damage to posts and uprights. The yards appear to have included a fowl run in addition to the milking yards and dairy.

The cement floor and bush timber uprights of the dairy remain, though the timber posts are severely fire-damaged. Scattered sheets of iron cladding from the dairy can be found on the ground. Timber fence posts of the milking yards are evident adjacent to the dairy on its northern side. One of two surviving log stock feed troughs, for salt and molasses, is located on the site. The yards were enclosed with K wire mesh on bush timber posts. Most of the K wire mesh within the yards has been removed or damaged. There is widespread use of K wire mesh throughout the station, particularly in stockyards. The mesh is effective pig fencing and may have been used around the homestead to prevent damage by feral pigs. The remains of a pigsty is located at the far eastern end of the yards fenced by lengths of low corrugated iron sheeting. Sheets of iron lie scattered around this area. A ship's tank for watering is also located in the vicinity.

=== Grounds and Surroundings ===
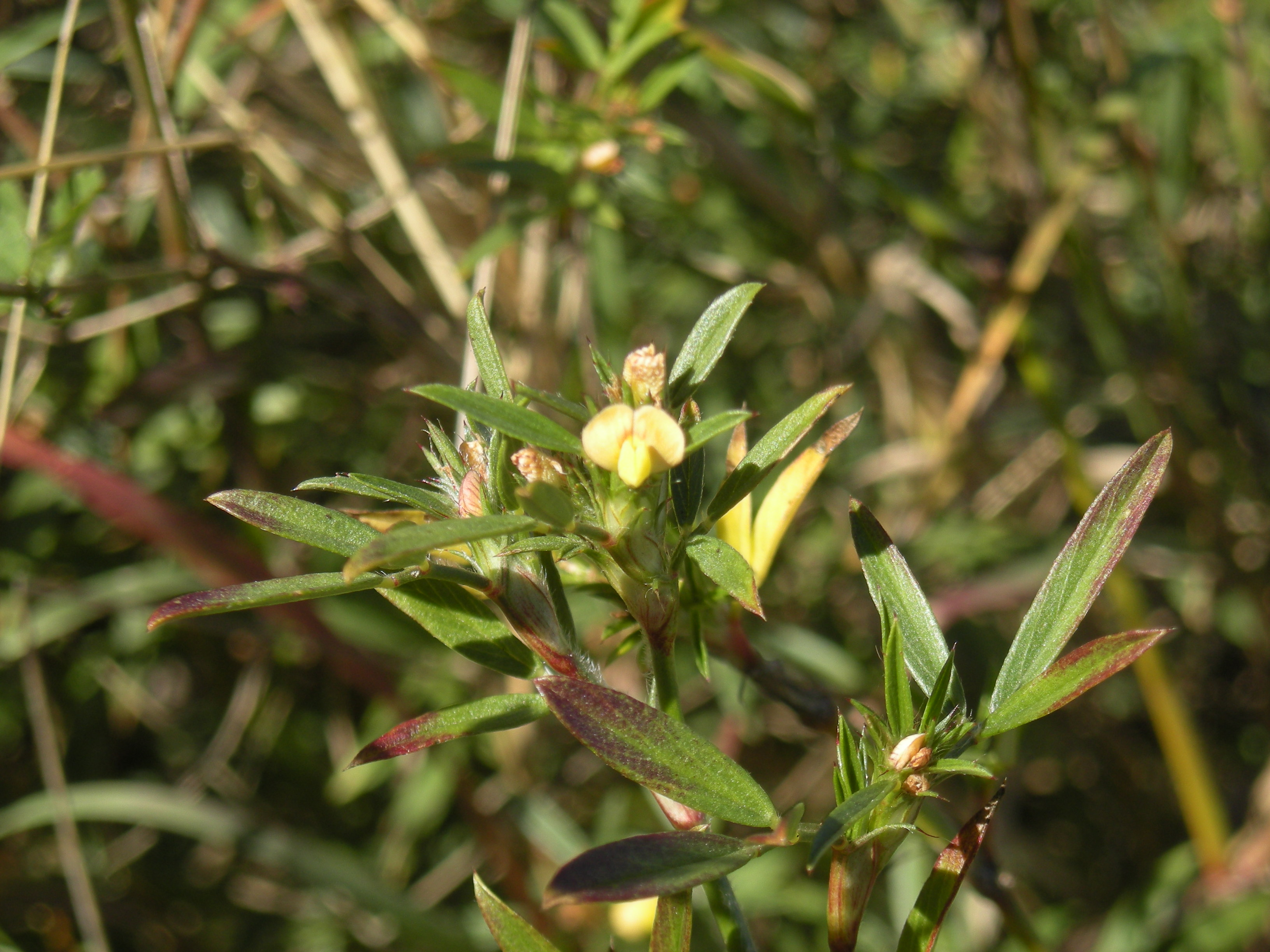
Townsville stylo (Stylosanthes humilis) blossom and foliage

The homestead grounds contain introduced trees and evidence of former gardens and maintained lawns. Posts of the former fence around the house remain standing, including the front gate posts with a pole of the former trellis alongside. This fence was originally covered with K wire mesh. There is no evidence of a tennis court that was constructed in front of the house, just beyond the fence, in 1945. The tennis court was made of antbed and had a high wire fence around it. Close to the house, alongside the front fence, is a concrete collared well, the bush timber uprights of an elevated tank stand, a windmill base, the concrete floor and stumps of a lighting generator and a 44-gallon fuel drum rack. The oil engine for the generator is now on the verandah of the main house. Adjacent to the present car park is a yard enclosed with a post and K wire mesh fence that was formerly used as a stallion paddock, and as a plot for growing experimental pastures including Townsville stylo.

The gravel surface of the former Battle Camp road remains visible between the main house and the outbuildings although the alignment has recently been ploughed and rehabilitated. The road, which was put through the homestead during construction, was later re-routed and now by-passes the homestead around the western end of the stockyards. The eastern end of the former east–west airstrip is evident about 200 metres (660 ft) north of the main house. The earth airstrip is now covered with sapling and shrub regrowth.

Plantings of introduced trees are concentrated around the house and outbuildings. The main house is surrounded by three mature frangipani trees and two large mango trees. Some of these trees were planted in the 1920s and 1930s. The house yards also contain a small mature mango tree, a large eucalyptus tree and a bean tree. A further three mature mango trees shade the stockmen's quarters and the workshop. Most of the mature native trees within the homestead area are locally occurring eucalyptus varieties including blackbutt, with some box and ironwood.

The Laura River bank is located immediately below the homestead grounds and yards. The river bank in this area contains a mixture of native and introduced plants within a gallery forest environment dominated by mature mango trees in the early fruit garden area. The fruit garden also contained custard apples. This area is a habitat for the spectacular Corypha utan palm which reaches its southernmost regional extent on Rinyirru National Park. The homestead potato garden occupied a cleared flat among the mango trees and is now used as an occasional camping area.

=== Graves ===
The sites of three graves are claimed to exist within the homestead area. The locations of these graves are shown on the site plan of the homestead contained in this study. The grave of Mick O'Keefe is identified by remnants of bush timber stumps (not in situ) and a bent star picket on the fence nearby. O'Keefe was a white stockman who died at Laura homestead in the early 1940s after a fall with a horse on Olive Vale station. The grave of an unknown Aboriginal stockman near the branding yard is identified by the occurrence of an area of redder sandy soil. The graves of Polly Seagren, who was buried in 1954, and another Aboriginal woman are located between the cattle dip and the top of the river bank in an area which was subsequently enclosed by yards.

== Heritage listing ==
Old Laura Homestead was listed on the Queensland Heritage Register on 28 July 2000 having satisfied the following criteria.

The place is important in demonstrating the evolution or pattern of Queensland's history.

Laura Station played an important role in the establishment of a pastoral industry on Cape York Peninsula, as one of the earliest pastoral holdings on Cape York Peninsula to operate under a license to occupy a new run of crown land. The place has associations with the development of Cooktown as a regional centre the Palmer River Goldfield, and with the establishment of transport and telegraphic communications on Cape York Peninsula.

The establishment of Laura Station contributed to the dispersal of Aboriginal people in the Laura district, and to the disruption of a traditional lifestyle, and to economic and social dependence on the Cape York Peninsula pastoral industry.

The place demonstrates rare, uncommon or endangered aspects of Queensland's cultural heritage.

Laura Station contains a rare surviving example of an early Cape York Peninsula pastoral station house that is still structurally sound and in an intact and essentially original condition. The place contains outbuildings and yards which typify traditional methods of construction that are no longer practiced, and which demonstrate a continued reliance on the superior qualities of local building materials.

The place is important in demonstrating the principal characteristics of a particular class of cultural places.

Laura Station represents an early example of the Cape York Peninsula "timber and iron" pastoral homestead tradition. The main house demonstrates regional construction characteristics of the time of its erection. The house, lean-to verandah, workshop and saddle shed, meat house and stockmen's quarters, station stockyards each demonstrate the principal characteristics of these types of place.

The place has a strong or special association with a particular community or cultural group for social, cultural or spiritual reasons.

Laura Station has strong and special associations for Aboriginal people through traditional affiliations with the land. The place also has strong and special associations for Aboriginal people through cultural and social ties with the homestead, and through economic dependence on the station as a component of the regional pastoral industry.
