= Hibbertia laurana =

Scientific classification
- Kingdom: Plantae
- Clade: Tracheophytes
- Clade: Angiosperms
- Clade: Eudicots
- Order: Dilleniales
- Family: Dilleniaceae
- Genus: Hibbertia
- Species: H. laurana

Binomial name
- Hibbertia laurana S.T.Reynolds

Species of flowering plant

Hibbertia laurana is a species of flowering plant in the family Dilleniaceae and is endemic to far northern Queensland. It is a shrub with hairy foliage, elliptic leaves, and yellow flowers, each with thirty to fifty stamens arranged in rows on one side of the two hairy carpels.

== Description ==
Hibbertia laurana is a shrub that typically grows to a height of up to 2–4 m (6 ft 7 in – 13 ft 1 in), its branches and leaves densely covered with rust-coloured hairs when young. The leaves are elliptic, 75–95 mm (3.0–3.7 in) long and 20–37 mm (0.79–1.46 in) wide on a petiole 8–12 mm (0.31–0.47 in) long, the edges of the leaves turned down or rolled under or with a few teeth. The upper surface of the leaves is slightly shiny and the lower surface is covered with white hairs. The flowers are borne in leaf axils in groups of three to five on peduncles 7–17 mm (0.28–0.67 in) long. There are egg-shaped or elliptic bracts 6–7 mm (0.24–0.28 in) long, the sepals are elliptic to egg-shaped with the narrower end towards the base, 1.3–1.7 mm (0.051–0.067 in) long and with rust-coloured hairs on the outside. The five petals are egg-shaped with the narrower end towards the base, yellow, 12–14 mm (0.47–0.55 in) long and with two lobes at the tip. There are thirty to fifty stamens fused at the base and arranged in rows on one side of the two hairy carpels, each carpel with two ovules.

== Taxonomy ==
Hibbertia laurana was first formally described in 1991 by Sally T. Reynolds in the journal Austrobaileya from specimens collected near the Laura River in 1983. The specific epithet (laurana) refers to Laura where this species is common.

== Distribution and habitat ==
This hibbertia usually grows among sandstone outcrops and is common near Laura in far north Queensland.

== Conservation status ==
Hibbertia laurana is classified as of "least concern" under the Queensland Government Nature Conservation Act 1992.

== See also ==
- List of Hibbertia species
