= Cape Bedford Mission =

Christian mission in Queensland, Australia

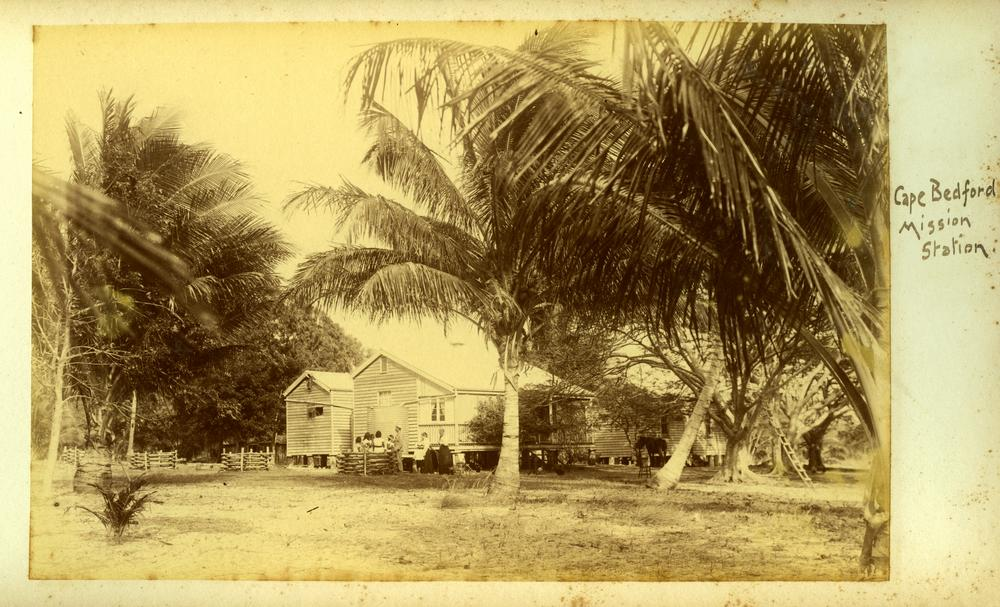
Pupils and teachers outdoors at Cape Bedford Mission, 1899

The Cape Bedford Mission, also known as Hope Vale Mission and Elim, was the first Christian mission on the Cape York Peninsula of Queensland, Australia. It is the oldest surviving mission in northern Queensland. It is at South Cape Bedford within the present-day locality of Hope Vale (15.2742°S 145.3449°E).

Founded by Lutheran staff from the Cooper Creek area of South Australia (who also established the Elim Aboriginal mission in Queensland), it became a stable community with the assignment of two young Neuendettelsau missionaries, George Schwarz and Wilhelm Poland). Schwarz stayed for 55 years, and Poland for 20; they added the Hope Vale site.

The community was evacuated during World War II because its German missionaries were reclassified as "enemy aliens" and imprisoned for the duration. After the war, Hope Vale was established on a new site. Schwarz is still remembered there; it has remained a cohesive community, home to indigenous activists.

== Language and traditional land ==
Guugu Yimithirr (also known as Koko Yindjir, Gugu Yimidhirr, Guguyimidjir) is an Australian Aboriginal language of Hope Vale and the Cooktown area. The language region includes the local government area of the Aboriginal Shire of Hope Vale and the Shire of Cook, particularly the localities of Cape Bedford, Battle Camp and sections of the Normanby River and Annan River.

== History ==
=== 19th century ===
The Cape Bedford mission was seen as a stepping stone into New Guinea, which Germany had acquired in 1884; Papua was British. Johann Flierl, who was working at the Cooper Creek mission in South Australia, was authorized to start a Lutheran mission in New Guinea. However, he was delayed for several months in Cookstown in 1885 and used this time to establish the Cape Bedford mission.

Flierl stayed for six months before moving to German New Guinea. He was replaced by C. A. Meyer and his wife, Mathilde, from the Cooper Creek mission. In September 1886, George Pfalzer and his wife (also named Mathilde) arrived from Germany to assist Meyer.

In January 1887, government start-up funding for the mission was withdrawn. Its support was taken over by the Neuendettelsau Society in Bavaria and German Lutheran communities in southern Australia. After another reorganization of the mission staff, George Schwarz arrived in September 1887 and Wilhelm Poland in 1889. These missionaries and their wives helped stabilize the mission and make it more cohesive. The Polands ran a school at Elim, while Schwarz settled with the young men on a new outstation at Hopevale for agricultural and pastoral work.

Poland and Schwarz emphasized teaching in the Guugu Yimidhirr language, and soon some of the mission girls were teaching at the school. In 1890, the Queensland government offered a £200 annual subsidy to the mission on condition that lessons be taught in English. This funding stopped in 1893, leaving Schwarz and Poland to teach the students in their choice of language. In 1900, when a government teacher arrived, English instruction resumed. Due to fluctuations in funding, for about the first 15 years of the mission's existence its residents were at least trilingual.

=== 20th century ===
Thirteen years after the mission's founding, the first adults were baptised in 1899 (before the adult baptisms, a few girls had been baptised in 1896 and 1897). In August 1892, a deathbed baptism was performed. In 1903, when the church opened at Hopevale, 12 residents were baptised: six girls, one boy and five young men.

In 1900, the Elim community was relocated to Hopevale with the arrival of government teacher Mary Allen. The residents of the Lutheran missions at Marie Yamba and Bloomfield were added in 1901 and 1902.

During World War I, Schwarz moved the mission and its residents to Spring Hill, south of the mission reserve and closer to the Cooktown road; as a result, it was now accessible overland as well as by sea. Communications with Neuendettelsau was disrupted, and supervision of the mission devolved to a Brisbane-based Lutheran committee. Although Schwarz was naturalised in 1905, married to an Australian woman and his children were Australian-born and spoke only English, one of the mission's neighbours called him an "officially-pampered Hun" and accused the government of "subsidizing an institution conducted by an enemy subject to teach the Aboriginals German sentiment and German language."

World War I ended the direct involvement of the Neuendettelsau Mission Society in the Cape Bedford mission. The Lutheran synod in Iowa, United States, assumed its financial support for a time; increasingly, it recruited staff from descendants of German immigrants (through the Lutheran Immanuel College in Adelaide) rather than from Germany. Nevertheless, there was a lingering sense that the mission was "too German." In 1933, the mission was given to the United Evangelical-Lutheran Church in Australia (UELCA).

The outbreak of World War II brought fears about the loyalties of Aboriginal people educated by Germans and in close contact with the Japanese in the marine industries. On 11 May 1942, American army trucks arrived; Schwarz was arrested, and everyone else was transported to the Cooktown wharf for transport to the Aboriginal reserve at Woorabinda in central Queensland. During their seven years in exile, 60 residents died.

In 1949, a group returned to the Hope Vale site to reestablish the mission. The army had taken over the land, and damage had been done by it and by storms. The mission was rebuilt on a new site on the Endeavour River, 25 kilometres (16 mi) from the old mission. Australian-born pastor Victor Wenke took on the role of missionary. The Lutheran Joh Bjelke-Petersen was a supporter of the Cape Bedford mission; it was the first mission to receive a Deed of Grant in Trust (DOGIT) in 1986, which turned it into a community with its own council.
