= Cape York Telegraph Line =

Telegraph line in Queensland, Australia

Cape York Telegraph Line - Locations of the Telegraph Stations

The Cape York Telegraph Line was a telegraph line built on the Cape York Peninsula, Queensland, Australia. It was completed in 1887 and stretched from Laura to Thursday Island.

== Construction ==
One of the more important events in the history of the Cape York Peninsula region was the construction of the Overland Telegraph Line. The northern section ran through very difficult country and the telegraph survey expedition was only the fourth overland expedition ever made to Cape York Peninsula.

The construction of the line was to be a major undertaking, commencing with the initial surveying expedition in 1883, led by John Bradford, which was to take more than two years to complete. The actual construction work involved the clearing of a corridor approximately two chains wide, or around forty metres, with specially manufactured galvanised iron poles used to support the line. Once the telegraph line was completed, ongoing maintenance was important, with gangs of telegraph linesmen dedicated to its upkeep.

Work on the Cape York Peninsula section was completed in 1886, except for 90 km between Moreton Telegraph Station and Mein where telegrams were carried by horse and rider until the line was completed. The line consisted of galvanised cast iron poles designed to support a single wire.

Frank Jardine, after whom Australia's most northerly river is named, was given the job of arranging delivery of materials to work gangs along the line. During the wet summer season of 1886–87, only 35 km of line were built and 200 km of clearing completed to the last station at Mein.

The line opened in 1887 and it linked Brisbane as the capital with Queensland’s northern outposts as well as the rest of the world. This was a vital communication link, stretching from Laura at the southern end of the Peninsula to Thursday Island.

== Telegraph stations ==
A number of telegraph stations were constructed along the length of the line including:

=== Cape York telegraph stations, North to South ===
- Paterson (Cape York) Telegraph Station
- McDonnell Telegraph Station
- Moreton Telegraph Station
- Mein Telegraph Station
- Coen Carrier Station
- Musgrave Telegraph Station
- Fairview Telegraph Station
- Laura Telegraph Station

=== Other related telegraph stations ===
- Palmerville Telegraph Station
- Walsh Telegraph Station
- Somerset Telegraph Station

== Telegraph line closure ==
After more than 100 years of service, the line was closed in 1987, being replaced by microwave transmission. Tenders were called initially for removal of the wire, and later for removal of the poles and cross arms but insulators, wires and even poles had already been removed, many for use in stockyards, gates and sheds. A testament to the durability of the galvanised poles, which were reused without further coating, even though they were by this time 110 years old.

== See also ==
- History of telegraphy in Australia
