= Hann River (Queensland) =

River in Queensland, Australia

Hann
- Location of Hann River river mouth in Queensland
- Etymology: William Hann

Location
- Country: Australia
- State: Queensland
- Region: Far North Queensland, Cape York Peninsula

Physical characteristics
- Source: Great Dividing Range
  - location: northeast of Kimba
  - coordinates: 15°32′56″S 143°42′25″E
  - elevation: 178 m (584 ft)
- Mouth: North Kennedy River
  - location: northwest of Lakefield
  - coordinates: 14°44′00″S 144°04′20″E
  - elevation: 11 m (36 ft)
- Length: 140 km (87 mi)
- Basin size: 9,557 km^{2} (3,690 sq mi)

Basin features
- River system: North Kennedy River
- Tributaries
  - left: Jungle Creek, Sandy Creek (Hann River, Queensland)
  - right: Wangow Creek, Rocky Creek (Hann River, Queensland)
- National park: Rinyirru National Park

The Hann River is a river in Far North Queensland, Australia.

The headwaters of the river rise in the Great Dividing Range on Cape York Peninsula northeast of the settlement of Kimba. The river flows in a north easterly direction, joined by four minor tributaries, crosses the Peninsula Developmental Road and then enters the Rinyirru National Park where it forms a series of braided channels then re-forms to a single channel and discharges into the North Kennedy River northwest of Lakefield. The river descends 167 metres (548 ft) over its 140-kilometre (87 mi) course.

The river has a catchment area of 9,557 square kilometres (3,690 sq mi) of which an area of 227 square kilometres (88 sq mi) is composed of estuarine wetlands.

The floodplain is composed of reddish grey sand loam produced from the underlying sand material of Cainozoic age. The underlying geology is predominantly alluvium of Quaternary age with areas of older rock made up of sandstone of Middle Jurassic age in the Bathurst Range and the granite of Late Silurian age in the Great Dividing Range of the upper catchment. Fringing vegetation is made up of stringybark, bloodwood, Moreton Bay ash and ironbark trees with a ground cover of coarse grasses such as speargrass.

The river was named after the explorer and pastoralist William Hann who explored the area in 1872. It was named by the prospector James Venture Mulligan in 1875.

== See also ==
- List of rivers of Australia § Queensland
