= Hope Vale, Queensland =

Hope Vale
- Town
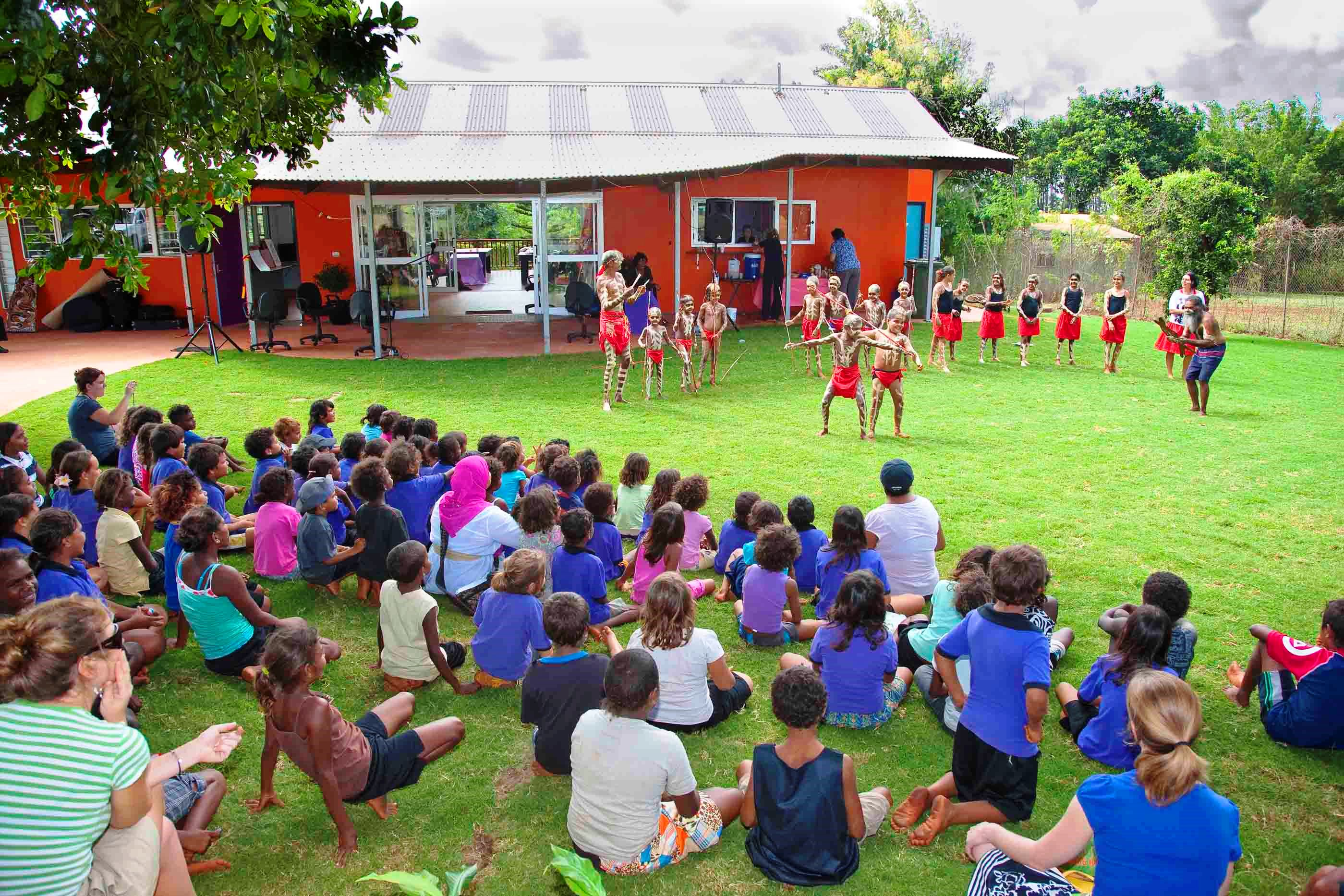
- Hope Vale, 2009

- Interactive map of Hope Vale
- Coordinates: 15.2962°S 145.1119°E
- Country: Australia
- State: Queensland
- LGAs: Aboriginal Shire of Hope Vale; Shire of Cook
- Location: 46 km (29 mi) NW of Cooktown; 372 km (231 mi) N of Cairns; 693 km (431 mi) N of Townsville; 2,029 km (1,261 mi) NNW of Brisbane

Government
  - State electorate: Cook
  - Federal division: Leichhardt

Area
  - Total: 2,088.6 km^{2} (806.4 sq mi)

Population
  - Total: 1,004 (2021 census)
  - Density: 0.48070/km^{2} (1.2450/sq mi)
- Time zone: UTC+10:00 (AEST)
- Postcode: 4895
Localities around Hope Vale
Starcke	Starcke	Lizard
Cooktown	Hope Vale	Coral Sea
Cooktown	Cooktown	Coral Sea

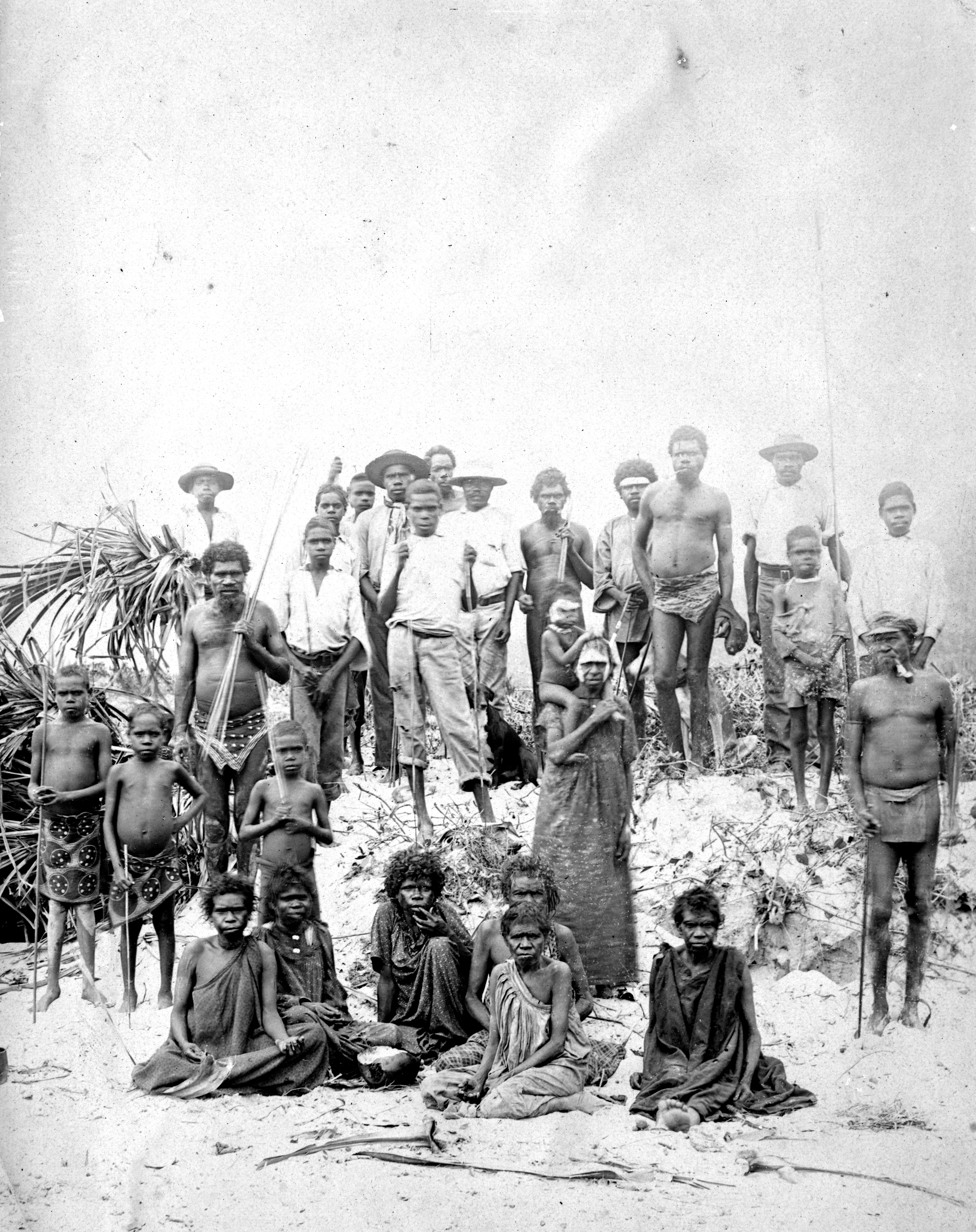
Indigenous members of the Hope Vale Mission, taken by George Schwarz, circa 1901

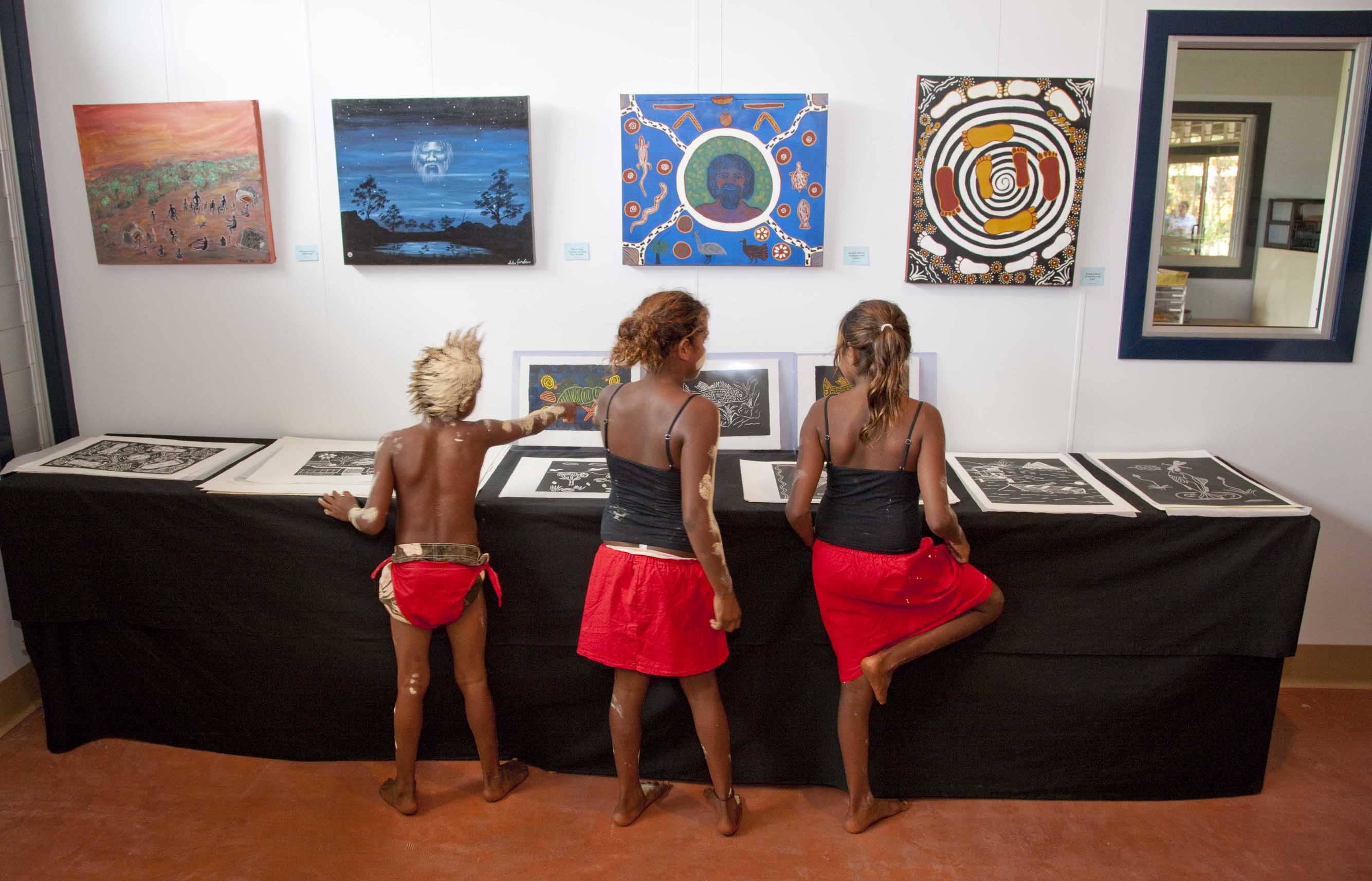
Kids at Hope Vale Art Centre Opening. April, 2009

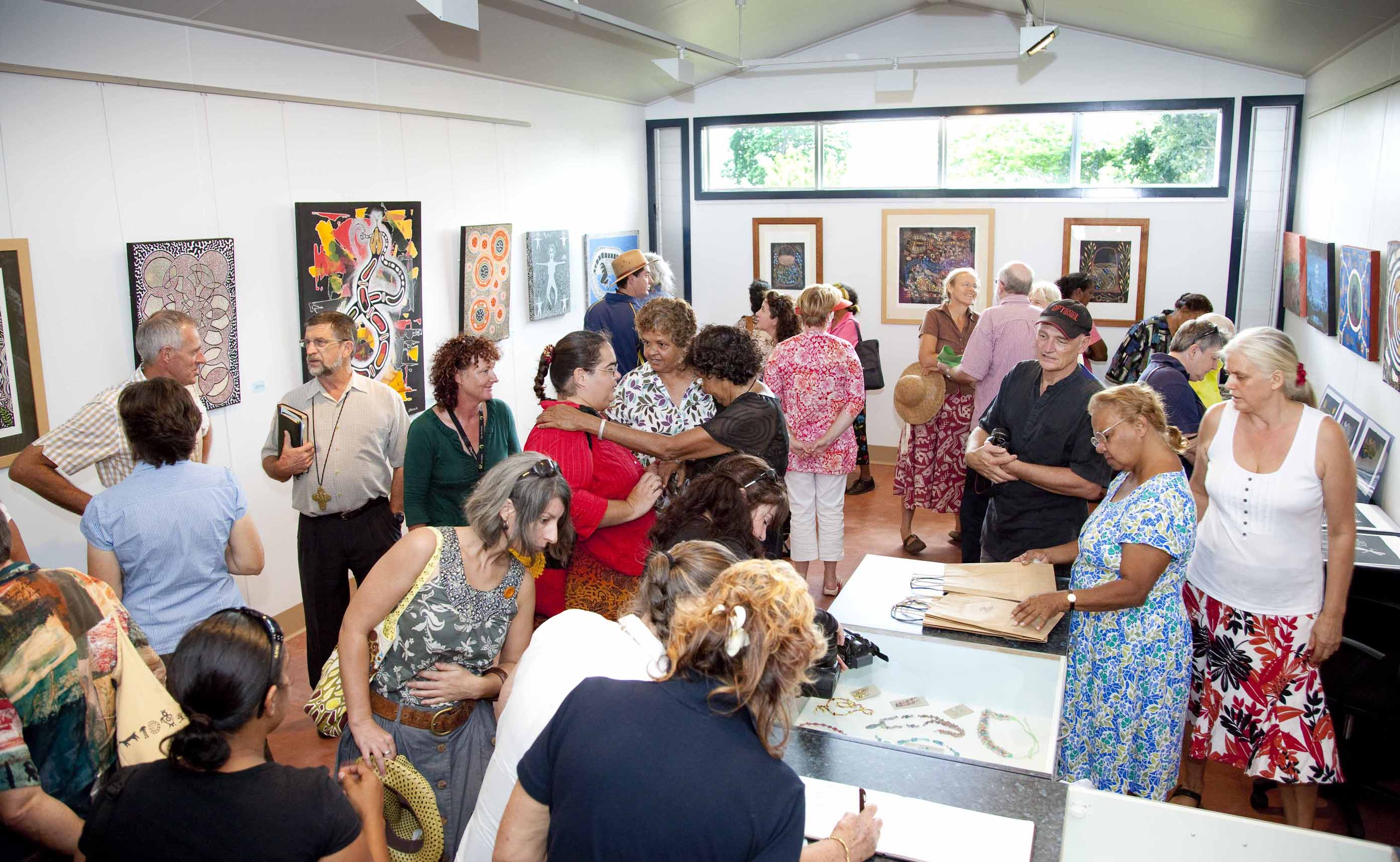
Hope Vale Art Centre Opening April, 2009

Hope Vale (also written as Hopevale) is a town within the Aboriginal Shire of Hope Vale and a coastal locality split between the Aboriginal Shire of Hope Vale and the Shire of Cook, both in Queensland, Australia. It is an Aboriginal community. In the 2021 census, the locality of Hope Vale had a population of 1,004 people.

== Geography ==
Hope Vale is on Cape York Peninsula about 46 kilometres (29 mi) northwest of Cooktown by road, and about 10 kilometres (6.2 mi) off the Battlecamp Road that leads to Rinyirru National Park and Laura.

The port at Cape Flattery is immediately offshore from Hope Vale (14.9865°S 145.3547°E). It has a 500-metre (1,600 ft) jetty with conveyor belt to load ships with silica sand from the Cape Flattery mine. It has a second wharf for import of fuel and other supplies needed by the mine. It is operated by Ports North, which has its headquarters in Cairns.

== History ==
Guugu Yimithirr (also known as Koko Yindjir, Gugu Yimidhirr, Guguyimidjir) is an Australian Aboriginal language of Hope Vale and the Cooktown area. The language region includes the local government area of the Aboriginal Shire of Hope Vale and the Shire of Cook, particularly the localities of Cape Bedford, Battle Camp and sections of the Normanby River and Annan River.

Johann Flierl, a missionary of the Lutheran Church, established the Elim Aboriginal Mission (1895) on the beach of the north shore of Cape Bedford, and the Cape Bedford Mission (1886) nearby. While it initially flourished, Elim's future became grim and the people were relocated to Hope Vale.

Owing to fears that the German-influenced Aboriginal people might cooperate with the advancing Japanese in World War II, the total population of 286 was evacuated south to various communities by the military in May 1942. The German Lutheran missionaries were sent to internment camps. Most of the people were sent to Woorabinda, near Rockhampton, in Queensland, where a large number reportedly perished from disease and malnutrition. Hope Vale was re-established as a Lutheran mission in September 1949. Aboriginal people from the Hope Valley and Cape Bedford Missions settled there. A work crew was allowed to return in 1949 and the first families came home in 1950.

Hopevale Post Office opened on 1 May 1965 and closed in 1990.

Due to a lack of reliable water supplies at Elim, and the establishment of a government funded school in Hope Vale itself, the community was shifted about inland to its present site.

Hope Vale is the oldest continuing mission community in North Queensland.

On 21 July 2008, the Hope Vale community opened the Indigenous Knowledge and Technology Centre, later renamed the Indigenous Knowledge Centre. It was established in partnership with Hope Vale Aboriginal Shire Council, the State Library of Queensland, Dot Com Mob, SJB Architects, Work Ventures, and the AMP Foundation.

== Demographics ==
In the 2011 census, the town of Hope Vale had a population of 974 people.

In the 2016 census, the locality of Hope Vale had a population of 1,015 people.

In the 2021 census, the locality of Hope Vale had a population of 1,004 people.

== Governance ==
Hopevale is no longer run as a mission by the church but by its own elected community council. In 1986 it received a "deed of grant in trust" (DOGIT) which "granted title to 110,000 ha of land which was previously Aboriginal Reserve Land held by the Under Secretary as trustee, to the community council to act as trustees of the land for the benefit of the residents." The Aboriginal Land Act 1991 (Qld) transferred into Indigenous ownership all previous reserve land under DOGIT (Deed of Grant in Trust) titles.

"The Warra people of the Hopevale Community of Eastern Cape York Peninsula in Queensland received acknowledgement of their native title rights in December 1997. The determination recognised rights of exclusive possession, occupation use and enjoyment over 110,000 ha."

== Education ==
Hope Vale has a primary (Preparatory to Year 6) campus of Cape York Aboriginal Australian Academy, which is on the corner of Thiele and Poland Streets (15.2952°S 145.1080°E). There are no secondary schools in Hope Vale. The nearest government secondary school is Cooktown State School (to Year 12) in neighbouring Cooktown to the south. There are also non-government schools in Cooktown. Some parts of Hopevale are too distant to attend Cooktown schools; the alternatives are distance education and boarding school.

== Amenities ==
The Hope Vale community has a strong choral singing tradition since its evacuation to Woorabinda. The ensemble has performed at the Queensland Music Festival on three occasions—in 2005, 2007 and 2009.

The Indigenous Knowledge Center is in the Jack Bambie building at 5 Muni Street. It provides a library service, training venue, and public Internet access.

== Notable people ==
- Eric Deeral (1932–2012), who was the second Australian Aboriginal person elected to an Australian parliament and the first to a state parliament.
- Queensland rugby league player Matt Bowen (born 1982).
- Lawyer and activist Noel Pearson (born 1965), who has criticised the level of violence in the community.

== Gallery ==
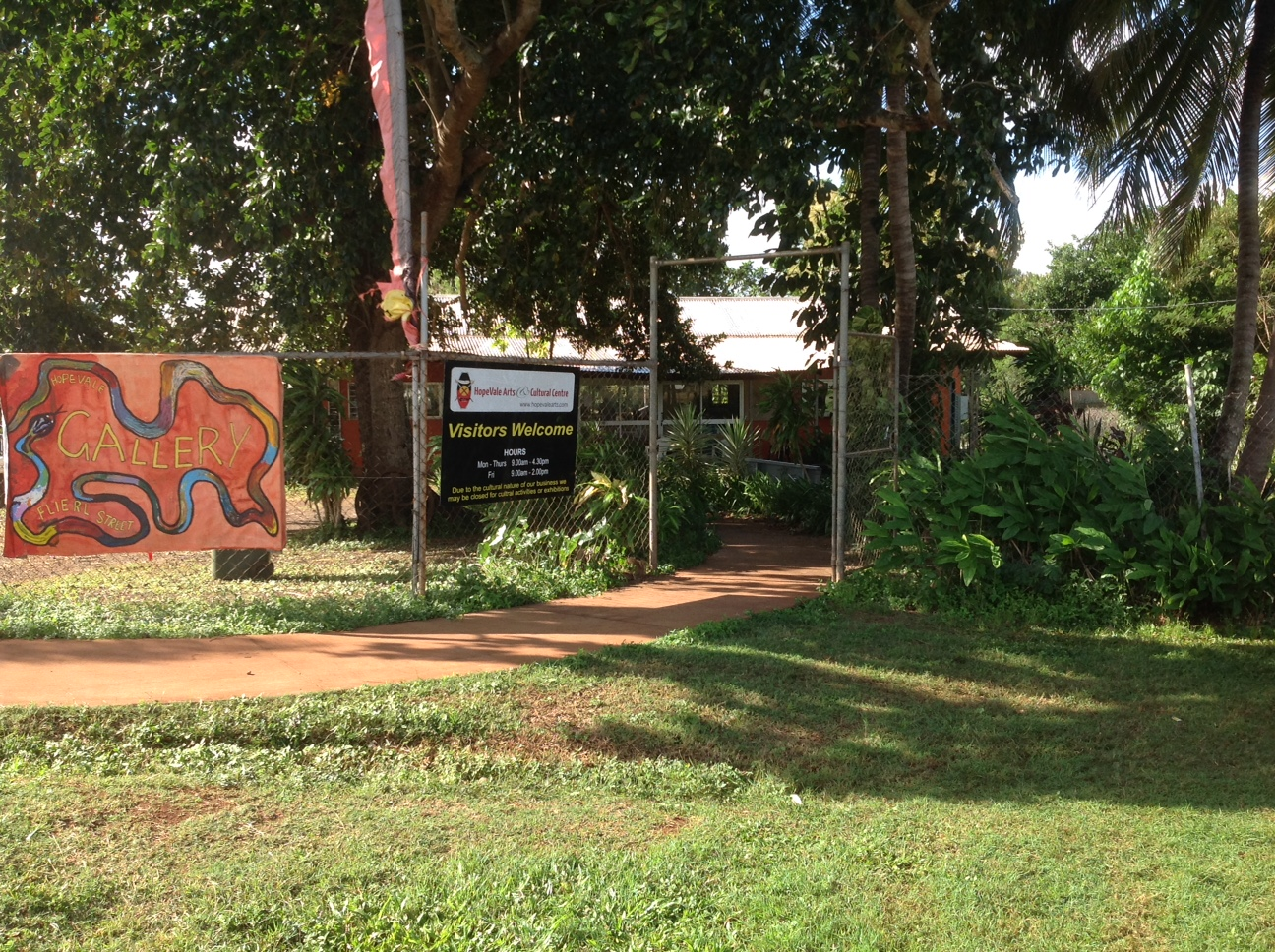
Hope Vale Arts Centre

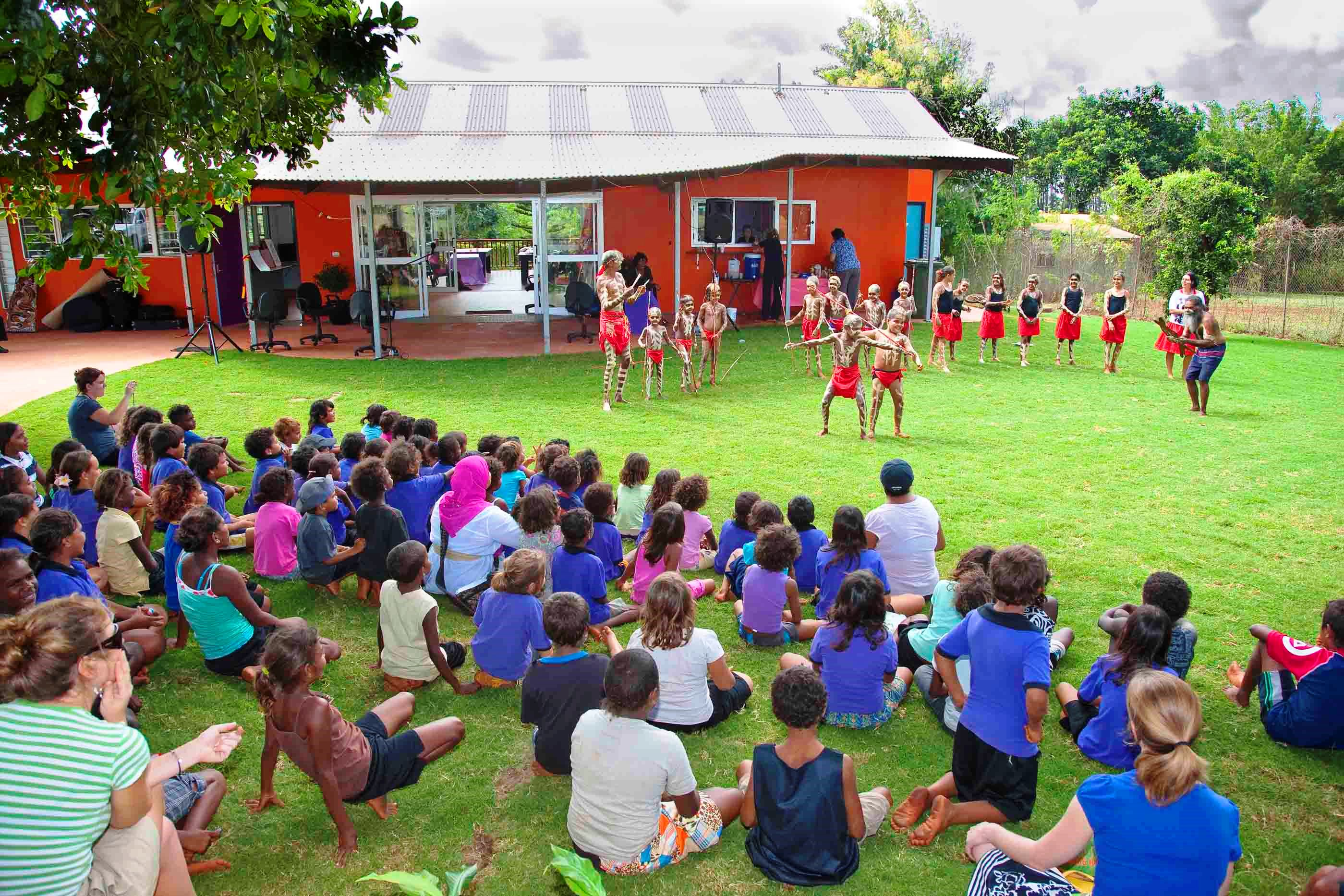
Hope Vale Art Centre Opening in April, 2009

== See also ==
- List of Indigenous Australian politicians
- Marie Yamba Aboriginal Mission, a mission situated south of Proserpine that commenced in 1897 and finished in 1902 with 24 Aboriginals being moved to Hope Vale Mission.
