= Aboriginal Shire of Hope Vale =

Hope Vale Aboriginal Shire
- Local government area
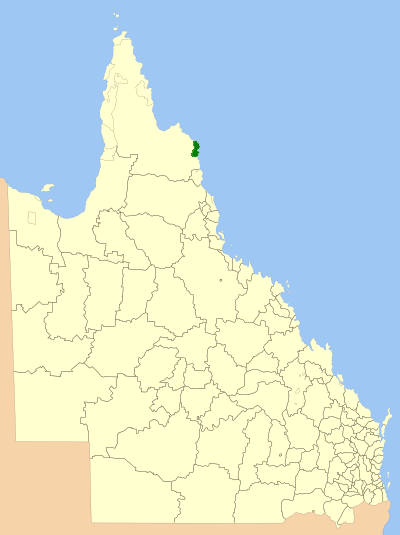
- Location within Queensland

- Interactive map of Hope Vale Aboriginal Shire
- Coordinates: 15.296°S 145.112°E
- Country: Australia
- State: Queensland
- Region: Far North Queensland
- Established: 1986
- Council seat: Hope Vale

Government
  - Mayor: Jason Grant Woibo
  - State electorate: Cook
  - Federal division: Leichhardt

Area
  - Total: 1,127 km^{2} (435 sq mi)

Population
  - Total: 976 (2021 census)
  - Density: 0.8660/km^{2} (2.2430/sq mi)
- Website: Hope Vale Aboriginal Shire
LGAs around Hope Vale Aboriginal Shire
Cook	Cook	Cook
Cook	Hope Vale Aboriginal Shire	Coral Sea
Cook	Cook	Coral Sea

The Aboriginal Shire of Hope Vale is a local government area in Far North Queensland, Queensland, Australia, north of the town of Cooktown. The majority of the Shire consists of Deed of Grant land that is held for the benefit of Aboriginal people particularly concerned with the land and their ancestors and descendants.

In the 2021 census, the Hope Vale Aboriginal Shire had a population of 976 people, of whom 863 (88.4%) are Indigenous Australians.

== History ==
Guugu Yimithirr (also known as Koko Yindjir, Gugu Yimidhirr, Guguyimidjir) is an Australian Aboriginal language of Hope Vale and the Cooktown area. The language region includes the local government area of the Aboriginal Shire of Hope Vale and the Shire of Cook, particularly the localities of Cape Bedford, Battle Camp and sections of the Normanby River and Annan River.

The area originally was set up as a German Lutheran mission in 1885 by missionaries, at what came to be known as the Cape Bedford Mission, 25 kilometres (16 mi) from what is now Hope Vale. The residents were evacuated to Woorabinda during World War II in 1942, and the land was used by the army. Many of the people died, and the survivors were not allowed to return until 1949. In September 1952, the land was formally gazetted as an Aboriginal reserve.

In 1986, under the Community Services (Aborigines) Act 1984, a Deed of Grant in Trust was given to the Hope Vale community. Like other DOGIT communities of the time, Hope Vale had a Community Council elected by Aboriginal people living in the community.

== Demographics ==
In the 2016 census, the Hope Vale Aboriginal Shire had a population of 918 people, of whom 897 (92.0% are Indigenous Australians.

In the 2021 census, the Hope Vale Aboriginal Shire had a population of 976 people, of whom 863 (88.4%) are Indigenous Australians.

== Responsibilities ==
The Hope Vale Aboriginal Shire Council operates under the requirements set out in the Queensland Local Government Act. However, in the township of Hope Vale the council is also the Trustee of the land and as such has added responsibilities that are quite different from a typical local government body. This includes responsibility for fisheries, alcohol management and employment initiatives.

The Hope Vale Aboriginal Shire Council operates an Indigenous Knowledge Centre (Nganthaanun-Milbi\Guugu Magubadaaygu), at the Jack Bambie Memorial Centre, in Hope Vale.

== Mayors ==
- 2008–2020 : Gregory Raymond McLean
- 2020–present: Jason Grant Woibo

== See also ==
- Hope Vale, Queensland
