= Laura River (Queensland) =

River in Queensland, Australia

Laura Hearn
- Location of Laura River river mouth in Queensland
- Etymology: Laura, the wife of Archibald Campbell Macmillan

Location
- Country: Australia
- State: Queensland
- Region: Far North Queensland, Cape York Peninsula
- City: Laura

Physical characteristics
- Source: Great Dividing Range
  - location: below Mount Murray
  - coordinates: 15°55′58″S 144°51′15″E
  - elevation: 234 m (768 ft)
- Mouth: confluence with the Normanby River
  - location: south of Hope Vale
  - coordinates: 15°12′00″S 144°26′04″E
  - elevation: 54 m (177 ft)
- Length: 126 km (78 mi)

Basin features
- River system: Normanby River
- Tributaries
  - left: Mosman River, Kennedy Creek
  - right: Ninda Creek, Deighton River
- National park: Rinyirru National Park

The Laura River is a river in the Cape York Peninsula region of Far North Queensland, Australia.

== Course and features ==
The Laura River rises on the eastern slopes of the Great Dividing Range below Mount Murray. The river flows generally northwest, shadowed by the Peninsular Development Road from nearby Lakeland and then flows north through the town of Laura and then the river forms the western border of the Rinyirru National Park, while the Peninsular Development Road continues north-west through Coen to reach the top of the peninsula at Bamaga. The river is joined by sixteen tributaries including the Deighton, Little Laura and Mosman rivers. The river reaches its confluence and empties into the Normanby River south of Hope Vale. The river descends 180 metres (590 ft) over its 126-kilometre (78 mi) course.

The river is crossed by the Mulligan Highway near Mount Gibson.

A railway bridge was built over this river, but because of a change in finances and plans it was never used, except for a test train.

== Etymology ==
The river was named as the Hearn River by William Hann on 19 October 1872, after his wife's family name. The name Laura was given by Archibald Macmillan, a road surveyor and explorer, after his wife, Laura Bower (nee Poingdestre).

== See also ==
- List of never used railways
- List of rivers of Australia § Queensland
