= Normanby River =

River in northern Queensland, Australia

Normanby East Normanby, West Normanby, East Normanby North Branch, East Normanby South Branch, Granite Normanby
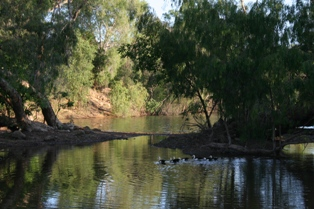

- Location of Normanby River river mouth in Queensland
- Etymology: In honour of George Phipps, 2nd Marquess of Normanby

Location
- Country: Australia
- State: Queensland
- Region: Far North Queensland, Cape York Peninsula, Wet Tropics of Queensland

Physical characteristics
- Source: Great Dividing Range
  - location: west of Wujal Wujal
  - coordinates: 15°55′S 145°12′E
- Source confluence: East and West Normanby Rivers
  - coordinates: 15°39′39″S 144°56′17″E
  - elevation: 125 m (410 ft)
- Mouth: Princess Charlotte Bay
  - location: Rinyirru National Park
  - coordinates: 14°23′47″S 144°08′37″E
  - elevation: 0 m (0 ft)
- Length: 350 km (220 mi)
- Basin size: 24,408 km^{2} (9,424 sq mi)
- Discharge
  - location: Princess Charlotte Bay
  - average: 390 m^{3}/s (14,000 cu ft/s)

Basin features
- Tributaries
  - left: Banana Creek (Queensland), Beardmore Creek, Cabbage Tree (Welcome) Creek, Laura River, Kennedy River
  - right: Nigger Creek (Queensland), Surrender Creek, Trapp Creek, Bridge Creek (Queensland), Jack River (Queensland), House Creek (Queensland)
- National park: Rinyirru National Park

The Normanby River, comprising the East Normanby River, the West Normanby River, the East Normanby River North Branch, the East Normanby River South Branch and the Granite Normanby River, is a river system in Far North Queensland, Australia.

This area is also referred to as the Norman-Laura Catchment and Norman Sub-Basin.

== Location and features ==
With its headwaters in the Great Dividing Range west of Wujal Wujal in the Wet Tropics of Queensland, the Normanby River is formed by the confluence of the East and West Branches of the river at an elevation of 125 metres (410 ft) AHD. The river flows generally north-northwestw through seasonally flooded savanna grassland to reach its mouth in Princess Charlotte Bay about 150 kilometres (93 mi) northwest of Cooktown. The river is joined by 18 tributaries including the Laura River. The river flows through the Rinyirru National Park, which covers as much as a fifth of the river's basin and is completely impassable during the wet season between November and May. The Rinyirru National Park consists of large wetlands which possess a high diversity of fish species. Near its mouth, the Normanby River flows very slowly and forms a large delta, which is almost inaccessible even during the dry season as there are no roads – even unsealed ones. This land, though, is still dry enough during the dry season that tropical rainforests cannot grow.

The combined river system descends from a peak elevation of 622 metres (2,041 ft) AHD to sea level, with a combined course from source to mouth of over 490 kilometres (300 mi).

While one source considers the Normanby River system as the third largest river in Australia, the Australian Government agency, Geoscience Australia, does not assess the Normanby River system within the ten longest rivers in Australia nor within the three longest continuous river systems in the country. The Normanby River system has less than half the flow of the Murray and Mitchell Rivers - though data regarding its flow are sparse with less than a third of the 24,408-square-kilometre (9,424 sq mi) catchment area gauged.

== Environmental ==
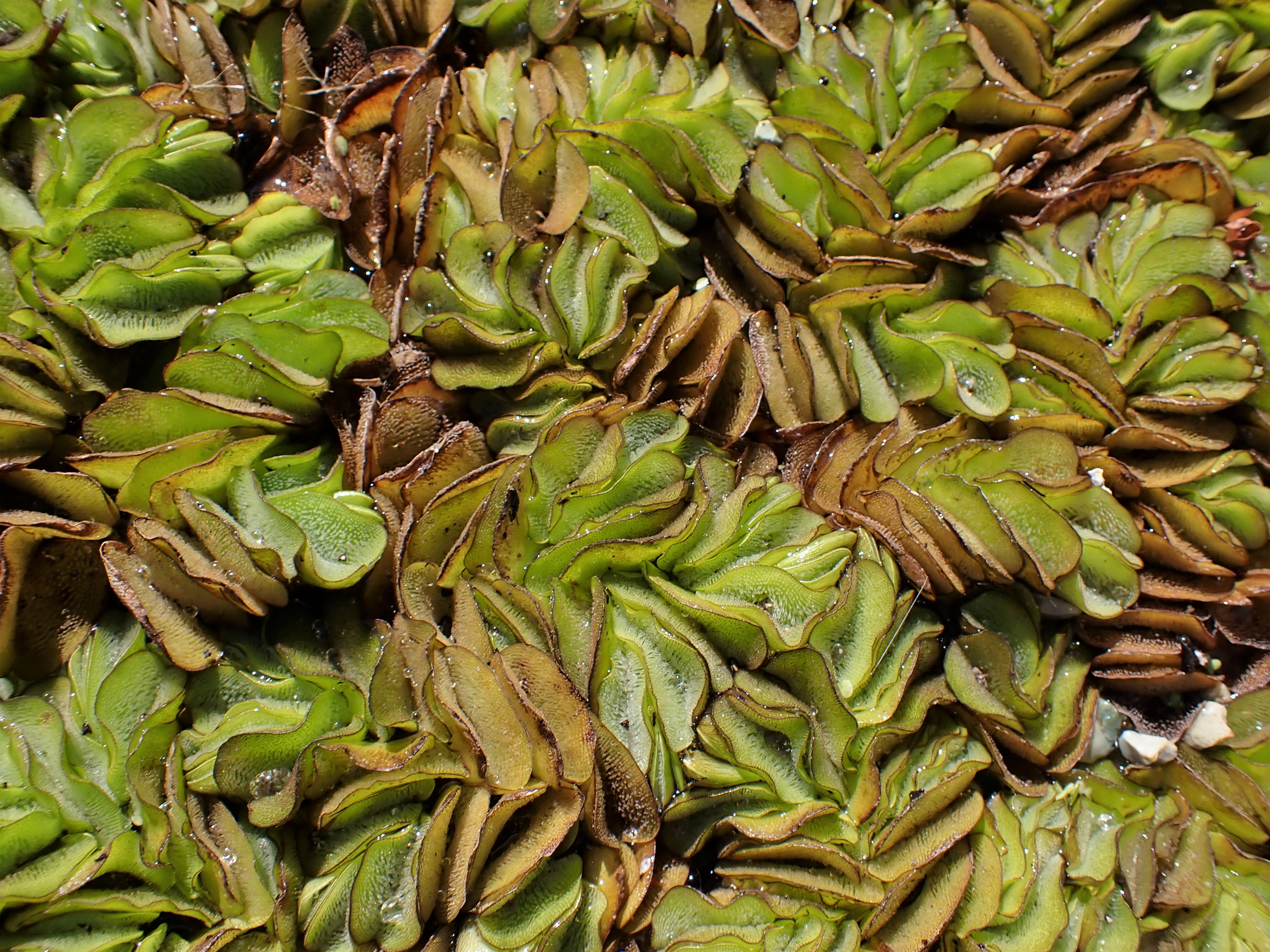
Salvinia molesta is a floating fern. It becomes a thick mat which can smother native aquatic plants, alter stream flow and deplete oxygen levels for aquatic organisms.

Together with the Laura River, the Normanby River system is the fourth largest river system in the Great Barrier Reef catchment, with the third largest mean annual discharge into the Reef. Consequently almost all scientific research into the flow and hydrology of the Normanby basin has been done with the health of the reef rather than the river per se in mind. The fact that the Normanby is completely free of dams means that Australian Government studies have used it as a model for the behaviour of rivers further south when they were in something closer to a virgin state.

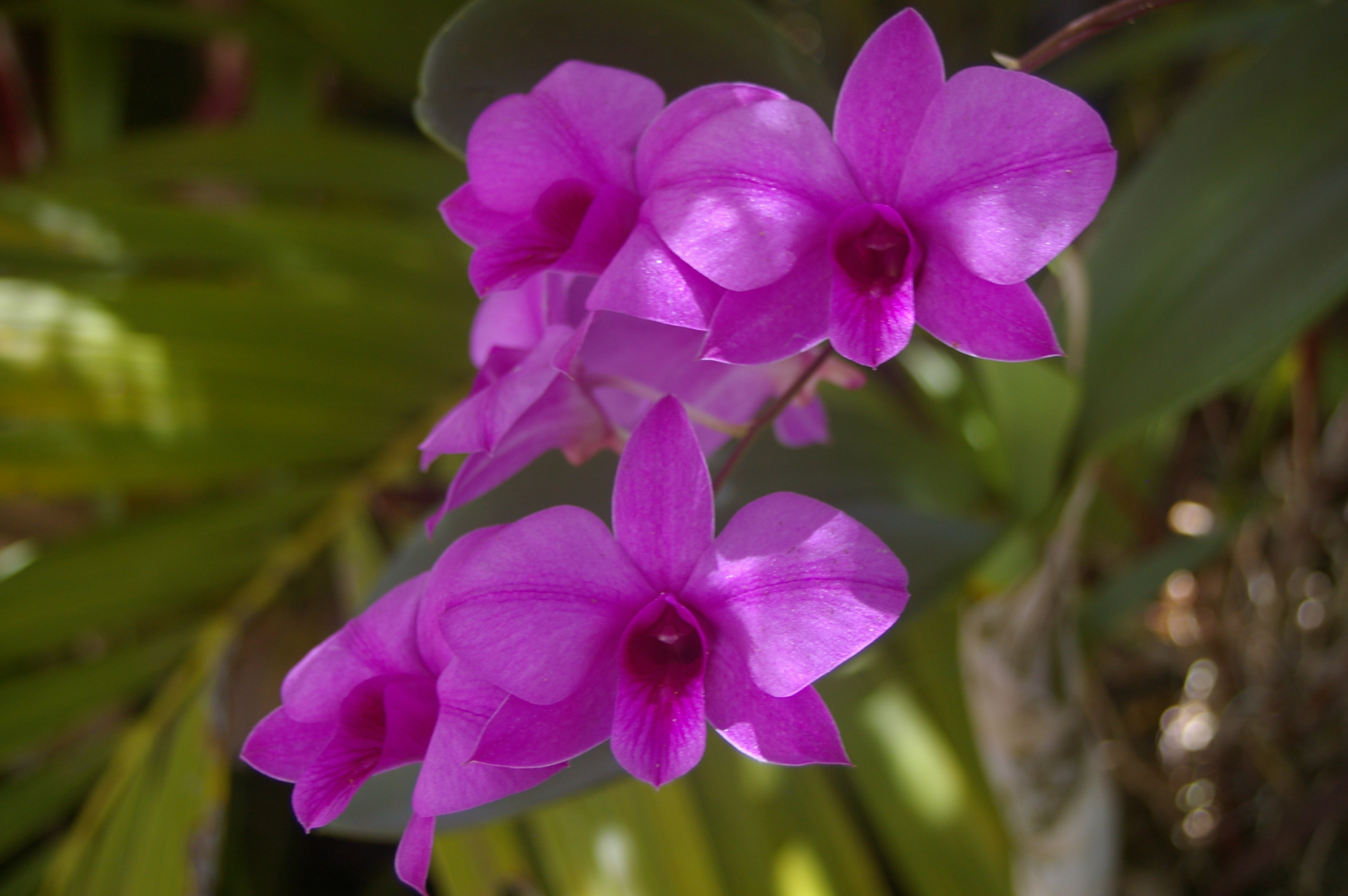
Cooktown orchid - Dendrobium bigibbum. Queensland 2008

In 2016 the Queensland Government purchased Springvale Station, a 56,295-hectare (139,110-acre) property in Lakeland. Springvale Station was purchased to add to the state's protected area network and complement activities being taken to reduce sediment run-off entering the Normanby River catchment. The Erosion Management Plan will inform the future management planning and activities to be delivered on Springvale Station, as well as identifying potential investment and collaboration opportunities for erosion control on the property.

Springvale Station Nature Refuge provides important habitat for endangered or vulnerable flora and fauna including the Cooktown orchid, ghost bat, northern quoll, red goshawk, spectacled flying-fox, spotted-tailed quoll, Semon's leaf nosed bat and large eared-horseshoe bat. There is no public access on the Nature Refuge.

== Industry ==
The small towns of Lakeland, Laura and Lakefield, several homesteads and remote communities are within the catchment. The Normanby basin is almost entirely used for the grazing of beef cattle on large stations - mostly worked by Aboriginal people. The density of cattle is very low, as are rents. The soils, being mostly ancient lateritic Orthents, are totally unsuitable for the growing sugar cane, which is the principal crop in tropical Australia. Tourism and maintenance of transport infrastructure after regular floods are important to the area. The estuarine areas support commercial and recreational fisheries.

== Etymology ==
The river was named by William Hann in September 1872 in honour of George Phipps, 2nd Marquess of Normanby, who served as the third Governor of Queensland between 1871 and 1874.

== Indigenous language ==
Guugu Yimithirr (also known as Koko Yindjir, Gugu Yimidhirr, Guguyimidjir) is an Australian Aboriginal language of Hope Vale and the Cooktown area. The language region includes the local government area of the Aboriginal Shire of Hope Vale and the Shire of Cook, particularly the localities of Cape Bedford, Battle Camp and sections of the Normanby River and Annan River.

== See also ==
- List of rivers of Australia § Queensland
