= Coen Carrier Station =

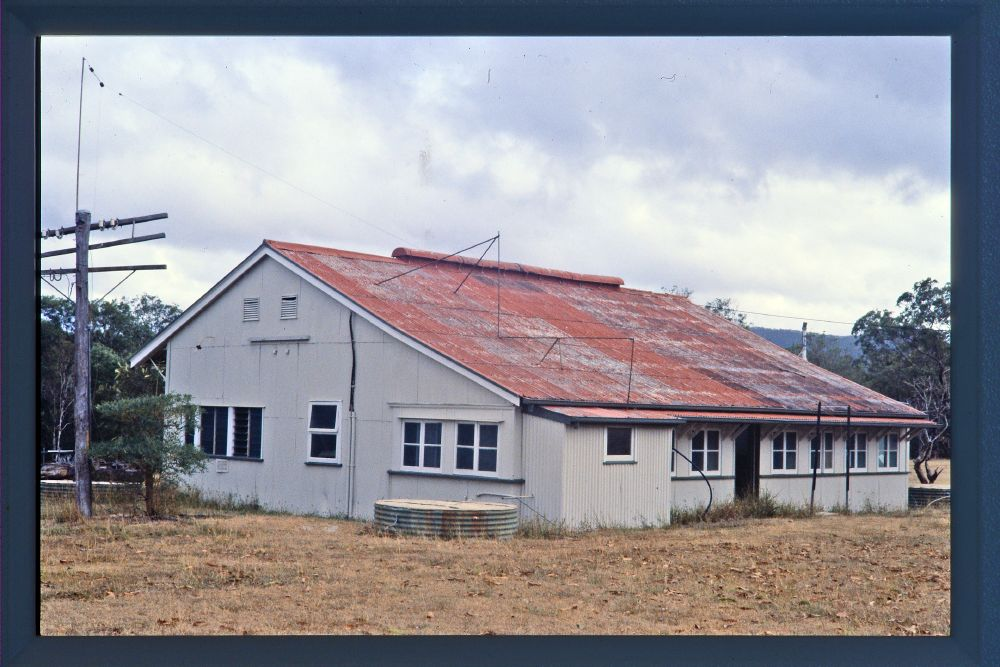
- Coen Carrier Station, 1995

- Location within Queensland Location within Australia
- 13.9399°S 143.1989°E
- Location: Coleman Close, Coen, Shire of Cook, Queensland, Australia

History
- Design period: 1939 - 1945 (World War II)
- Built: 1942

Site notes
- Architect: Postmaster-General's Department

Queensland Heritage Register
- Official name: Coen Carrier Station (former), Coen Telegraph Station, Coen Carrier Repeater Station
- Type: state heritage (built)
- Designated: 27 May 1997
- Reference no.: 601485
- Significant period: 1942 onwards
- Builders: Postmaster-General's Department

Coen Carrier Station is a heritage-listed telegraph station at Coleman Close, Coen, Shire of Cook, Queensland, Australia. It was designed and built in 1942 by the Postmaster-General's Department. It is also known as Coen Telegraph Station and Coen Carrier Repeater Station. It was added to the Queensland Heritage Register on 27 May 1997.

== History ==
Coen Carrier Station, a prefabricated steel and corrugated iron building, was erected in 1942 as part of an urgent upgrading of the Cape York Peninsula overland telegraph line (established in the 1880s), undertaken in response to Japanese aggression in the Pacific and South East Asia. It was one of four identical carrier stations.

Far North Queensland had emerged as the new "frontier" following the discovery of gold on the Palmer River in the early 1870s, and the resultant impetus to prospect further north. Various smaller goldfields were opened at this period. An abortive gold rush at Coen in 1878–80 was re-kindled in 1886, and by 1889 Coen comprised a one-street township of tents and bark huts. The Coen Goldfield was proclaimed in 1892.

A telegraph station had been erected at Coen in 1886, when the overland telegraph line from Laura, at the southern end of Cape York Peninsula, to Thursday Island at the northern end, was being constructed. The line, which opened to Thursday Island on 25 August 1887, provided contact between the isolated communities of the peninsula, as well as a link to southern capitals via Cooktown, and played an important role in the development of the region. The expansion of telegraphic communication on the peninsula was also an integral element of Brisbane's administrative control of Far North Queensland and of communication with British-annexed New Guinea and the Torres Straits from 1885, and was considered important for the defence of Queensland in the late 19th century.

From the late 1930s, with the impending threat of war with Japan in the Pacific, telecommunications once again were identified as an important element of national defence. Even before Australia's declaration of war on Japan on 9 December 1941, (following simultaneous attacks by the Japanese on Hawaii, Hong Kong and Malaya), there was urgent interest in upgrading defence facilities on Cape York Peninsula. The two priorities were serviceable airfields and adequate communications. By July 1941 a new airfield about 35 kilometres (22 mi) north of Coen, and a new runway at Iron Range (near Lockhart River), had been completed, yet at this period the Coen Telegraph Station had only morse facilities and a 6-line pyramid switchboard (local telephone only).

The bombing of Darwin and Townsville by the Japanese in March and July 1942 respectively, and the arrival of American troops in north Queensland from March 1942, hastened the plans to deliver improved telecommunications to the Peninsula. Australia became the centre of communications in the South Pacific. Following the Coral Sea and Midway campaigns in May 1942, and the shifting of the war north to New Guinea, it was clear that north Queensland and Cape York Peninsula would play a crucial role in the offensive against Japan. Adequate telecommunications were essential to link the airfields of far north Queensland and the fighting fronts in New Guinea and beyond, with the command centres in Townsville, Brisbane and the southern capitals.

The wartime upgrading of telecommunications from Townsville to Thursday Island was a dedicated defence facility, but was linked directly to the 1880s overland telegraph. An R Type Carrier System, developed in Australia during World War II to cater for pockets of telecommunications traffic congestion, particularly in places where a telephone carrier was not available to supply a channel for a voice frequency system, was installed along the old overland telegraph route from Mount Surprise to Cape York. The R Type system was limited to four duo-directional channels using a frequency between 3300 and 5220 cycles per second, which was above normal voice frequency but below the range of other established carrier systems, which used high frequency bands. There was no interference when both normal speech frequency and the carrier frequency operated over the same pair of copper wires. In effect, one pair of copper wires from Townsville to Thursday Island was to carry 3 facilities: normal voice frequency telephone, upgraded telegraph carrier, and a telephone carrier.

Cape York Peninsula's R Type Carrier System necessitated the installation of:

- a pair of copper wires strung on the existing pole route between Townsville and Cape York, with loops into Cooktown and Iron Range, a total of 1,036 miles (1,667 km)
- a three channel carrier system (telephone) with terminals at Townsville and Cape York and repeaters at Charters Towers, Mount Surprise, Fairview and Coen
- a four channel telegraph system with terminals at Townsville and Cape York
- voice frequency repeaters at Charters Towers, Mt Surprise, Fairview, Coen and Cape York
- submarine cable from Cape York to Horn Island and from Horn Island to Thursday Island
- power equipment, including diesel generators and batteries, at Mt Surprise, Fairview, Coen and Cape York
- buildings (carrier stations) at Mount Surprise, Fairview, Coen and Cape York to accommodate equipment.

The work of upgrading telecommunications on Cape York Peninsula commenced in August 1942, and was a major undertaking. The US Army Signal Corps provided 1200 men, the Australian Army Signals made 600 men available, and the Postmaster-General's Department (PMG) provided 60 supervisors. Australian Army Engineers under the supervision of the PMG were responsible for that part of the line northwards from the Hann River, including the upgrading of facilities at Coen and the construction of the new loop line from Coen to Iron Range, a massive job. Progress was rapid, and the whole of the line work was completed by 23 November 1942.

At Coen, a carrier station was erected adjacent to the 1886 telegraph station and connected to it. Like the buildings erected at Mount Surprise, Fairview and Cape York, the Coen Carrier Station was of pre-fabricated steel frame construction, with outer walls of corrugated iron, concrete floors, and fibrous cement roofing. They were partitioned internally with fibrous-cement sheeting to provide equipment, power and battery rooms, and living accommodation for two or three maintenance staff. It is thought that these buildings were designed and pre-fabricated in one of the PMG's workshops in Melbourne, Adelaide or Sydney.

Due to the impossibility of obtaining carrier telegraph equipment from overseas during the war years, the PMG's Melbourne workshops manufactured and assembled a prototype four-channel VF telegraph (Type R), which was in design early in 1942, and intended principally for use by the Army Signals Corps in forward areas and for combat use in New Guinea and the Pacific. This was the equipment installed between October and December 1942 at the Cape York Peninsula carrier stations. The buildings were far from complete during installation. All telecommunications channels between Townsville and Cape York were in service on 9 December 1942, but the Coen Carrier Station was not completed until Boxing Day. A PMG officer and two Army signals personnel staffed each of the carrier stations, with the PMG officers in charge.

The improved telecommunications on Cape York Peninsula played a vital role in defeating Japanese aggression. In 1945, following the cessation of hostilities, control of the telecommunications facilities reverted to the Postmaster-General's Department. The circuits were now available for public use, permitting for the first time telephone trunk calls from Cape York Peninsula to the rest of Australia. In the mid-1950s, improvements in the system enabled the telephone exchange in Coen to be removed to a building in the main street of the town, although working equipment remained in the 1886 Telegraph Station and in the Carrier Station. By the second half of the 1960s, the 1886 Telegraph Station in Coen had become redundant and it was removed to Rokeby Pastoral Station and re-used as a house. It has since been destroyed.

In 1982 a broadband radio system was in service as far as Coen, at which time the open-wire route to the south was abandoned as a trunk route, and the installation of an automatic exchange at Coen was made possible. Broadband was extended to Thursday Island in 1987, at which time the open-wire line north of Coen was abandoned.

Throughout this era of improvement, Coen Carrier Station was used chiefly to house telephone equipment. During the installation of the broadband system, it served as living quarters for PMG workers. Following completion of the broadband system, the building was used to accommodate Telecom service personnel working in the region; but has been unoccupied since 1990. The site is now located within a Ranger Station operated by the Department of Environment.

Of the four carrier stations erected on Cape York Peninsula in 1942, the Coen Carrier Station is the most intact. Fairview Carrier Station was closed in 1949 and, although still in situ, is now an outstation of Olive Vale Station. In 1958 the Mount Surprise to Coen system was re-routed from Cooktown to Coen and the original line from Mount Surprise to Fairview via Palmerville was abandoned as a trunk route in 1963. The Cape York Carrier Station was closed in 1960.

== Description ==
Coen Carrier Station is located on a gently sloping site, approximately 45 by 50 metres (148 ft × 164 ft), to the north side of Coen at the junction of the Coen River and Lankelly Creek. It is adjacent to the site of the original Telegraph Station. The Carrier Station building is essentially rectangular in form, set on a concrete slab. The framing of the building is a combination of timber and steel. The base plates are timber while all the vertical members are steel. Timber frames house the windows and doors. The timber is generally in sound condition throughout the building, although termite damage is evident in some locations. The exterior walls are 1-inch (25 mm) ripple iron that is screwed to the steel frame. The interior fibrous cement sheet walls are also screwed to the steel frame. The joints are covered with wide timber cover-strips which are nailed to the base plates and the occasional timber members. The original windows are timber framed, and located on the west elevation. Louvres have been installed on the southern elevation.

The original part of the building consists of three rooms; an equipment room, power room and battery room. Two rooms of equal size and shape are located at the southern end of the building with the third across the whole of the northern end. No original telegraph equipment remains in the building. Attached to the eastern side is a glazed verandah running the full length of the building that is clad in ripple iron up to the height of the sill. The internal rear wall of the verandah is clad in 1-inch (25 mm) ripple iron. At the southern end of the verandah there is a kitchen annexe. This projects slightly and is clad in standard 3-inch (76 mm) corrugated iron.

A laundry and bathroom are attached at the northern end of the building and have been constructed on a concrete slab, higher than the level of the main floor. The structure is timber framed, clad both internally and externally in fibrous cement sheeting. It has a skillion roof and louvred windows. There is a path leading north-west out from the laundry. At the north and south ends of the building, the original fixtures for the telegraph and electric wires are still visible.

The ceiling framing, like the walls, is a mixture of timber and iron. The rafters and king-posts are iron, while the battens are timber. The gable roof is clad with 3-inch (76 mm) corrugated fibrous cement nailed to battens. The roof eaves are supported on timber and steel brackets. A corrugated iron awning over the eastern verandah is attached to the main roof and is supported on timber brackets. A large ventilator runs along the ridge of the roof and small circular one set into the roof is located near the north-west corner.

The remains of three water tanks are located at the north-east, south-east and south-west corners of the building. A Colorbond steel shed with a flat roof has recently been erected at the north-west corner of the site.

== Heritage listing ==
The former Coen Carrier Station was listed on the Queensland Heritage Register on 27 May 1997 having satisfied the following criteria.

The place is important in demonstrating the evolution or pattern of Queensland's history.

The Coen Carrier Station is significant for the important role it played as part of the defence and communications network of Cape York Peninsula, which was crucial to Australia during World War II. The place includes the site of the adjacent 1886 Telegraph Office (demolished), and illustrates the continued association of Coen with telecommunications on Cape York Peninsula for well over a century, providing contact between isolated communities on the peninsula and with southern capitals and beyond.

The place demonstrates rare, uncommon or endangered aspects of Queensland's cultural heritage.

The building, constructed in 1942, is rare as one of Queensland's few remaining carrier station buildings designed and prefabricated in Australia by the Postmaster-General's workshops during World War II, and installed under difficult circumstances.

The place is important in demonstrating a high degree of creative or technical achievement at a particular period.

The former Coen Carrier Station is significant as a development of new technology.

The place has a special association with the life or work of a particular person, group or organisation of importance in Queensland's history.

The station has a special association with the work of the Postmaster-General's Department in developing new technology in Australia during World War II, and with the important work of the Australian Army Signals Corps, who installed the Cape York Peninsula line and carrier equipment in 1942 and staffed the building during the war.
