= Lakefield, Queensland =

Lakefield
- Suburb
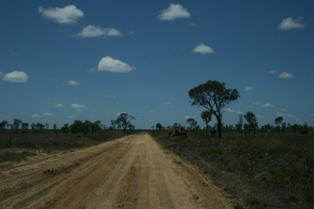
- Lakefield, 2010

- Interactive map of Lakefield
- Coordinates: 14.775°S 144.2288°E
- Country: Australia
- State: Queensland
- LGA: Shire of Cook
- Location: 101 km (63 mi) N of Laura; 169 km (105 mi) NW of Cooktown; 394 km (245 mi) NNW of Cairns; 2,066 km (1,284 mi) NNW of Brisbane

Government
  - State electorate: Cook
  - Federal division: Leichhardt

Area
  - Total: 8,386.2 km^{2} (3,237.9 sq mi)

Population
  - Total: 21 (2021 census)
  - Density: 0.00250/km^{2} (0.00649/sq mi)
- Time zone: UTC+10:00 (AEST)
- Postcode: 4892
Suburbs around Lakefield
Yarraden	Coral Sea	Starcke
Yarraden	Lakefield	Starcke
Laura	Laura	Cooktown

Lakefield is a coastal rural locality in the Shire of Cook, Queensland, Australia. In the 2021 census, Lakefield had a population of 21 people.

== Geography ==
Lakefield is on the east coast of Cape York Peninsula. Lakefield Road runs through the locality from the south-east to the north-west with connections via the Endeavour Battle Camp Road to Laura and the Peninsula Developmental Road to the south-west and to Cooktown to the south-east.

The Normanby River, North Kennedy River, Hann River, Annie River, and many other creeks and rivers join as they flow to the northern coast of Lakefield to the Coral Sea, creating many lakes.

=== Islands ===
The northern boundary of the locality extends offshore to include a number of islands (from north to south):

- Clack Island (14.0766°S 144.2561°E)
- King Island (14.0955°S 144.3332°E)
- the Flinders Group (14.1986°S 144.2430°E), consisting of:
  - Stanley Island (14.1527°S 144.2350°E)
  - Flinders Island (14.1802°S 144.2598°E)
  - Blackwood Island (14.2134°S 144.2229°E)
  - Maclear Island (14.2100°S 144.2504°E)
  - Denham Island (14.2278°S 144.2657°E)
  - Rocky Islets (island group, 14.2591°S 144.3547°E)

=== Bays and passages ===
The locality includes the following bays and passages:

- Stokes Bay on the west coast of Stanley Island (14.1543°S 144.2241°E)
- Owen Channel between Stanley and Flinders Islands (14.1666°S 144.2333°E)
- Fly Channel between Flinders Island and Mclear Island (14.2047°S 144.2577°E)
- Rattlesnake Channel between Denham Island and the mainland (14.25°S 144.25°E)
- Princess Charlotte Bay off the north-west coast of the locality (14.2168°S 143.9680°E)
- Bathurst Bay off the north coast of the locality (14.2359°S 144.3677°E)

=== Coastal features ===
Lakefield has the following coastal headlands (from north to south):

- Cape Flinders on Stanley Island (14.1312°S 144.2384°E)
- Nares Point on Stanley Island (14.1495°S 144.2676°E)
- Richards Point on Flinders Island (14.1589°S 144.2725°E)
- Heming Point on Stanley Island (14.1840°S 144.2100°E)
- Pirie Head on Flinders Island (14.1941°S 144.2817°E)
- Howard Bluff on Denham Island (14.2178°S 144.2769°E)
- Pullen Point on Blackwood Island (14.2305°S 144.2022°E)
- Combe Point on the mainland (14.2551°S 144.2158°E)
- Bathurst Head on the mainland (14.2622°S 144.1962°E)

=== Mountains ===
Lakefield has the following mountains (from north to south):

- Castle Peaks on Stanley Island (14.1476°S 144.2581°E) 206 metres (676 ft)
- Flinders Peak on Flinders Island (14.1887°S 144.2668°E) 318 metres (1,043 ft)
- Bay Hill (14.2957°S 144.3962°E) 430 metres (1,410 ft)
- Conspicuous Peak (14.3925°S 144.2563°E) 267 metres (876 ft)
- Alkaline Hill (14.4228°S 144.2148°E) 114 metres (374 ft)
- Jane Table Hill (14.5030°S 144.1310°E) 145 metres (476 ft)
- Jeannette Hill (14.5149°S 144.1421°E) 76 metres (249 ft)
- Walkers Hill (14.6593°S 144.1534°E) 58 metres (190 ft)
- Wards Hill (14.6635°S 144.1538°E)
- Balsers Knob (14.6651°S 144.2217°E) 126 metres (413 ft)
- Flat Top Hill (14.7271°S 144.2283°E) 113 metres (371 ft)
- Black Hill (14.8590°S 144.3522°E) 105 metres (344 ft)
- Mount Jack (15.1761°S 144.6728°E) 171 metres (561 ft)

=== Land use ===
The Rinyirru National Park (formerly Lakefield National Park) occupies the south and west of the locality. The Cape Melville National Park is in the north-east of the locality extending into neighbouring Starcke to the east. Apart from the Rocky Islets, all of the islands in the locality are either fully or partially within the Flinders Group National Park.

Most of the locality is within these protected areas, while the remaining land is mostly undeveloped. There is a small area used for grazing on native vegetation east of the mouth of Normanby River along the coast.

== History ==
Flinders Island and the Flinders Group were named by Lieutenant Charles Jeffreys, a naval officer on HM Armed Brig Kangaroo on 30 May 1815, after Captain Matthew Flinders. Clack Island was also named by Jeffreys, but the origin of the name is unknown.

The other islands are all believed to be named after naval officers who commanded survey vessels operating around the northern Queensland coast:

- King Island named after Lieutenant (later Rear Admiral) Phillip Parker King, commander of HM Colonial Cutter Mermaid from 1818 to 1820
- Blackwood Island named after Captain Francis Price Blackwood, who commanded HMS Fly from 1843 to 1845
- Stanley Island named after Captain Owen Stanley, who commanded HMS Rattlesnake from 1847 to 1848
- Denham Island named after Captain Henry Mangles Denham, who commanded HMS Herald from 1853 to 1861
- Maclear Island named after Lieutenant John Maclear, who commanded HMS Alert from 1881 to 1882.

== Demographics ==
In the 2011 census, Lakefield and surrounding areas had a population of 184 people.

In the 2016 census, Lakefield had a population of 16 people.

In the 2021 census, Lakefield had a population of 21 people.

== Heritage listings ==
Lakeland has a number of heritage-listed sites, including:

- Old Laura Homestead, Rinyirru National Park (15.3454°S 144.4538°E)

== Education ==
There are no schools in Lakefield. The nearest government primary school is Laura State School in neighbouring Laura to the south; however, this school would be too distant for students in the north and west of the locality to attend. Also there are no secondary schools nearby. The alternatives are distance education and boarding school.
