= Yadaneru =

Aboriginal Australian people

Yadaneru, also written Jeteneru, refers to a tribe at one time thought to have existed in the Cape York Peninsula of northern Queensland.

== Country ==
Norman Tindale states that the Yetteneru possessed tribal lands of about 900 square miles (2,300 km^{2}) centered around Saltwater Creek, in the southwest corner of Princess Charlotte Bay, and that their inland extension went to somewhere in the vicinity of Musgrave.

== People ==
During ethnographic work by Tindale and H.M. Hale, reports reached them that a tribe of this name, once existed, whose grounds were along the Saltwater Creek and Annie River, somewhere west of the Kokolamalama inland from Princess Charlotte Bay. By that time the tribe, if it were an independent reality, verged on disappearing. The authors wrote that:

They are called the " salt pan blackfellows" by natives speaking English, and use a dialectic variation of Kokolamalama. They are nearly extinct, only one old man and five women remaining alive in 1927, There were two clans, one on the seashore and one inland, but little could be learned about them.'

== Alternative names ==
- Yadaneru
- Wurangung
- Ompindamo(?) (Note: This variant is listed in two papers by Ursula McConnel, 1939-1940, and it is Tindale who made a provisory connection between this name and that of the Yetteneru.)

== Sources ==
- "AIATSIS map of Indigenous Australia". AIATSIS. 28 July 2023.
- Hale, H. M.; Tindale, N.B. (1933). "Aborigines of Princess Charlotte Bay, North Queensland". Records of the South Australian Museum. 5 (1). Adelaide: 64–116.
- McConnel, Ursula H. (September 1939). "Social Organization of the Tribes of Cape York Peninsula, North Queensland". Oceania. 10 (1): 54–72. doi:10.1002/j.1834-4461.1939.tb00256.x. JSTOR 40327744.
- McConnel, Ursula H. (June 1940). "Social Organization of the Tribes of Cape York Peninsula, North Queensland (Continued)". Oceania. 10 (4): 434–455. doi:10.1002/j.1834-4461.1940.tb00305.x. JSTOR 40327867.
- Tindale, Norman Barnett (1974). "Jeteneru (QLD)". Aboriginal Tribes of Australia: Their Terrain, Environmental Controls, Distribution, Limits, and Proper Names. Australian National University Press. ISBN 978-0-708-10741-6. Archived from the original on 18 January 2018.
