= Starcke, Queensland =

Starcke
- Suburb
- Interactive map of Starcke
- Coordinates: 14.5772°S 144.7716°E
- Country: Australia
- State: Queensland
- LGA: Shire of Cook
- Location: 156 km (97 mi) NNW of Cooktown; 482 km (300 mi) NNW of Cairns; 2,135 km (1,327 mi) NNW of Brisbane

Government
  - State electorate: Cook
  - Federal division: Leichhardt

Area
  - Total: 6,247.3 km^{2} (2,412.1 sq mi)

Population
  - Total: 0 (2021 census)
  - Density: 0.00000/km^{2} (0.00000/sq mi)
- Time zone: UTC+10 (AEST)
- Postcode: 4895
Suburbs around Starcke
Lakefield	Coral Sea	Coral Sea
Lakefield	Starcke	Lizard
Lakefield	Cooktown	Hope Vale

Starcke is a coastal locality in the Shire of Cook, Queensland, Australia. In the 2021 census, Starcke had "no people or a very low population".

It is in the Australian Eastern Standard time zone.

== Geography ==
Large areas of Starcke are protected areas being within the Cape Melville National Park, Muundhi National Park, Biniirr National Park, Juunju Daarrba Nhirrpan National Park, and Daarrba National Park.

== History ==
The locality was named after the Starcke cattle property.

== Demographics ==
In the 2016 census, Starcke had "no people or a very low population".

In the 2021 census, Starcke had "no people or a very low population".

== Education ==
There are no schools in Starcke. The nearest government primary school is the Hopevale Campus of the Cape York Aboriginal Australian Academy in neighbouring Hope Vale to the south-east. Given the size of Starcke, this school might be too distant to attend. There are no secondary schools nearby Starcke. Distance education and boarding school are other options.

== See also ==
- Starcke National Park
