= Marie Yamba Aboriginal Mission =

Marie Yamba Aboriginal Mission Queensland
- Coordinates: 20.5966°S 148.5799°E
- Established: 1887
- Abolished: 1902

Marie Yamba was a Lutheran church mission active between 1887 and 1902, and located between Proserpine and Bowen in North Queensland, Australia.

In February 1888 the Missionary Society of the United German and Scandinavian Lutheran Church established the mission. The government gave them a land grant of 30 square miles to house their mission reserve.

Mr. Andreas Christian Claussen, who had chosen the site of the mission, was also its first missionary.

Local settlers initially supported the creation of the mission, and hoped it would become a useful way of controlling the local Aboriginal population, but over time they became increasingly opposed to it. The mission had relatively little success in converting Aboriginal people, and by 1901 it was in serious financial trouble.

When it closed in 1902, 23 Aboriginal people at Marie Yambawere transferred to Hope Vale Mission.
