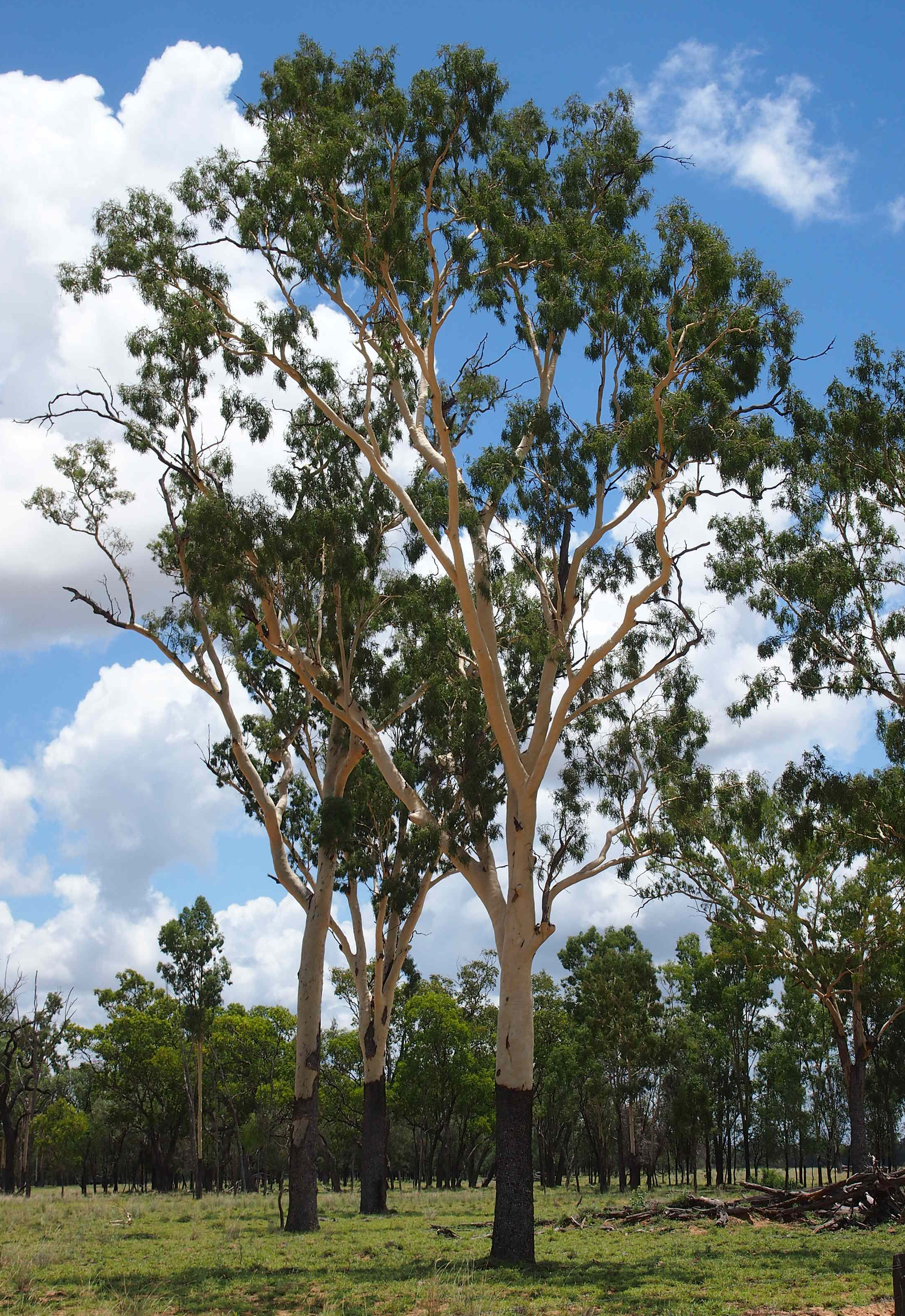

Conservation status
- Near Threatened (IUCN 3.1)

Scientific classification
- Kingdom: Plantae
- Clade: Tracheophytes
- Clade: Angiosperms
- Clade: Eudicots
- Clade: Rosids
- Order: Myrtales
- Family: Myrtaceae
- Genus: Corymbia
- Species: C. tessellaris

Binomial name
- Corymbia tessellaris (F.Muell.) K.D.Hill & L.A.S.Johnson

Synonyms
- Eucalyptus hookeri F.Muell.; Eucalyptus tesselaris Benth. orth. var.; Eucalyptus tessellaris F.Muell.; Eucalyptus tessellaris F.Muell. var. tessellaris; Eucalyptus viminalis Hook. nom. illeg.

= Corymbia tessellaris =

Carbeen

Species of plant

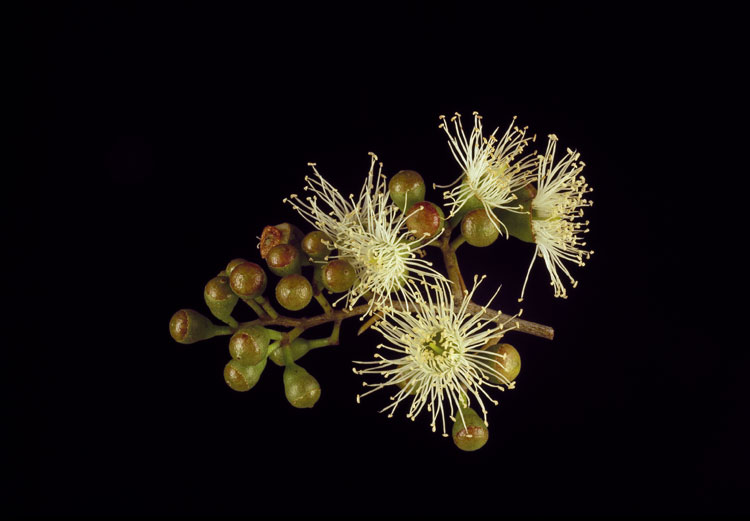
Flower buds

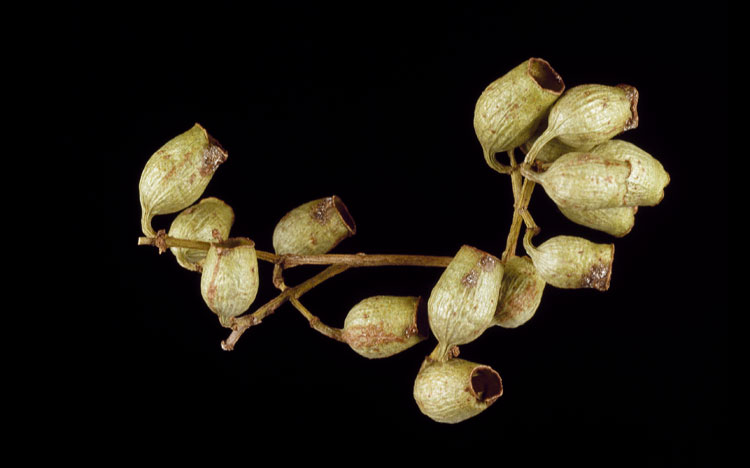
Fruit

Corymbia tessellaris, commonly known as carbeen or Moreton Bay ash, is a species of tree that is endemic to north-eastern Australia. It has rough, tessellated bark on the lower trunk abruptly changing to smooth, whitish bark above, narrow lance-shaped adult leaves, flower buds in groups of three or seven, white flowers and cylindrical or urn-shaped fruit.

== Description ==
Corymbia tessellaris is a tree that typically grows to a height of 30–35 m (98–115 ft) and forms a lignotuber. The trunk is almost always straight, making up half to two thirds of the total tree height, with a crown of slender branches. It has rough, tessellated greyish bark on the lower 1–4 m (3 ft 3 in – 13 ft 1 in) of the trunk, abruptly changing to smooth whitish bark above. Young plants and coppice regrowth have lance-shaped leaves that are arranged in opposite pairs at first, 55–110 mm (2.2–4.3 in) long and 10–20 mm (0.4–0.8 in) wide, tapering to a short petiole or sessile. Adult leaves are arranged alternately, the same shade of green to greyish on both sides, narrow lance-shaped to linear, 90–240 mm (3.5–9.4 in) long and 6–25 mm (0.24–0.98 in) wide on a petiole 5–15 mm (0.2–0.6 in) long.

The flower buds are arranged on the ends of branchlets on a branched peduncle 2–7 mm (0.08–0.28 in) long, each branch of the peduncle with three or seven buds on pedicels 1–4 mm (0.04–0.16 in) long. Mature buds are oval to pear-shaped, 4–6 mm (0.16–0.24 in) long and 3–5 mm (0.12–0.20 in) wide with a rounded operculum, often with a small point on the tip. Flowering mainly occurs between October and January and the flowers are white. The fruit is a cylindrical or urn-shaped, thin-walled capsule 6–12 mm (0.24–0.47 in) long and 6–10 mm (0.24–0.39 in) wide on a pedicel 1–3 mm (0.04–0.12 in) long and with the valves enclosed in the fruit.

== Taxonomy ==
Carbeen was first formally described in 1859 by Ferdinand von Mueller, who gave it the name Eucalyptus tessellaris in the Journal of the Proceedings of the Linnean Society, Botany. In 1995, Ken Hill and Lawrie Johnson changed the name to Corymbia tessellaris, publishing the change in the journal Telopea.

== Distribution and habitat ==
Corymbia tessellaris is widespread in north-eastern Australia where it grows in undulating open forest and woodland. It is found from Cape York Peninsula and south through eastern Queensland to near Narrabri and Kyogle in northern New South Wales. It also occurs on some Torres Strait Islands and in southern New Guinea.

== Uses ==
=== Indigenous uses ===
Yirrganydji and Djabugay people use medicine made from the tree to treat wounds and conditions such as dysentery, and use the wood to make tools.

=== Use in horticulture ===
Carbeen is resistant to strong winds, heat and drought and can be propagated from seed.

=== Use in industry ===
The wood is heavy and has been used for bridge construction and making spears. The tree produces many organic compounds with industrial potential, including pinenes, aromadendrene, limonene and globulol.

== See also ==
- List of Corymbia species
