= Paterson (Cape York) Telegraph Station =

- Location within Queensland Location within Australia
- 10.707186°S 142.511628°E
- Location: Peak Point, Punsad Bay, Cape York Peninsula, Queensland, Australia

The Paterson Telegraph Station (later known as The Cape York Telegraph Station) was a telegraph station in Queensland, Australia. It was the original location for the end of the Cape York Telegraph Line. It was the landing point for the undersea cable Telegraph Cable between Cape York Peninsula and Thursday Island.

== History ==
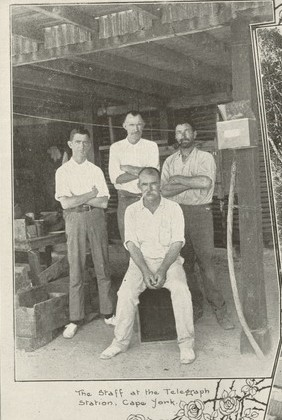
The Staff of the Telegraph Station. 1917.

The telegraph station was named after the Postmaster-General, the Hon. Thomas Macdonald-Paterson and was originally located in the area of the Paterson Creek Mouth (the original ruins can still be seen).

The building was completed before the beginning of the wet season in November 1886 and was opened on 25 August 1887.

In 1894 the station was relocated from Peak Point to the north eastern end of Punsand Bay near Bay Point on the West Coast of Cape York, approximately two miles from the north-most point on the Australian continent.

== The Cape York Telegraph Line Connection ==
=== To the South: McDonnell Telegraph Station ===
The next station to the south of Paterson was the McDonnell Telegraph Station and was completed before work stopped for the wet season in November 1886.

McDonnell was named after John McDonnell, Under Secretary and Superintendent of Telegraphs of the Post and Telegraph Department. The same John McDonnell was also an uncle of J . R . Bradford .

=== To the North: Undersea cable to Thursday Island ===
The undersea armoured cable that connected Patterson to Thursday Island consisted of 18 sea miles of underwater cable was laid by the Cable Ship Recorder and crossed Horn Island. The line formed part of the Cape York Telegraph Line. The laying work was completed in November 1886.

== Station transferred ==
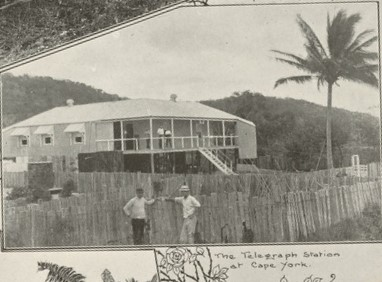
The Telegraph Station at Cape York as Published in The Queenslander, 17 November 1917.

In 1894 the station was relocated from Peak Point to Punsand Bay on the West Coast of Cape York, approximately two miles from the North most point on the Australian Continent. It is not known why the station was transferred and it is inherent that the Telegraph Line and undersea cable were also relocated as part of this process. It is fact that it was relocated, as ruins exist at both locations, but no references to support the reason have been located.

At Punsand Bay, the station was built high up on a Sandy Plateau overlooking the sea. The tip of Cape York was clearly visible to the North East, with lovely sandy beaches drawing the eye to the tip and Peak Point was visible to the South West. Many Islands were in the view, often crisscrossed with ships as they made their way to and from Thursday Island. A large area was kept clear of vegetation and brush to help prevent Bush Fires and provide a clear view of any approaching people. The soil was bleached White and any visitors were warned of the many Death Adders which were as white as the sandy soil.

Hector Macquarrie from New Zealand visited the station in October/November 1928 in a Baby Austin with his co-driver Dick Matthews at the end of the first ever motor vehicle drive to the tip of Cape York.

== Receiving mail ==
The mail launch travelled to the station every fortnight from Thursday Island. This was known locally as "Mail Day" and served as a gathering for all the locals who would arrive at the Telegraph Station to await the boat and catch up on all the local news. Mr. Tom Dunwoodle and Torrie Woodhead manned the mail boat for some years and were known for arriving with large, freshly caught fish to share with the people waiting for their mail.

== Postmasters and their families who ran the station ==
Known families who ran the station were:

- Mr. and Mrs Jim Carey (16 years in residence)
- Mr. Allan Sorenson
- Mr Dave Evans
- Mr and Mrs Norman Peak
- Mr Tom Bryant
- Mr and Mrs Dan Gleeson
- Mr and Mrs Jack Cupitt
- Mr and Mrs Max Gunn, 1926–1930

== Station closure ==
The station was closed on 14 September 1960. Sadly, all that remains of the station now is a concrete slab and some frangipani trees taken as cuttings from the Lockerbie Station.

== Retracing the 1883 telegraph route to the station ==
In 1973, the Cape York Historical Expedition 1973 was led by Mr. Malcolm M. Rea. The party consisted of seven men on horseback and followed the 1883 Telegraph Route.
