= Moreton Telegraph Station =

- Location within Queensland Location within Australia
- 12.453121°S 142.638807°E
- Location: Telegraph Rd, Wenlock, Shire of Cook, Queensland, Australia

The Moreton Telegraph Station, also known as the Moreton Electric Telegraph Station, located on the banks of the Wenlock River was part of the Cape York Telegraph Line and was completed in 1887 and closed in 1987.

As of 2025, Moreton Telegraph Station is a tourism business, offering accommodation, local tours and sharing stories of its history.

== History ==
The Telegraph Station is on the lands of the Kaantju people who speak the Kaanju language (also known as Kaanju and Kandju) which is a language of Cape York. The Kaanju language region includes the landscape within the local government boundaries of the Cook Shire Council.

When the Telegraph Station was constructed the buildings were built like a fortress and used heavy gauge galvanised iron and the construction included two turrets containing gun ports. Additionally, all of the windows at the station were fitted with iron shutters which could be bolted from within.
