= Rinyirru (Lakefield) National Park =

National park in Queensland, Australia

Coordinates: 14.9°S 144.0°E

Rinyirru National Park
- IUCN category II (national park)
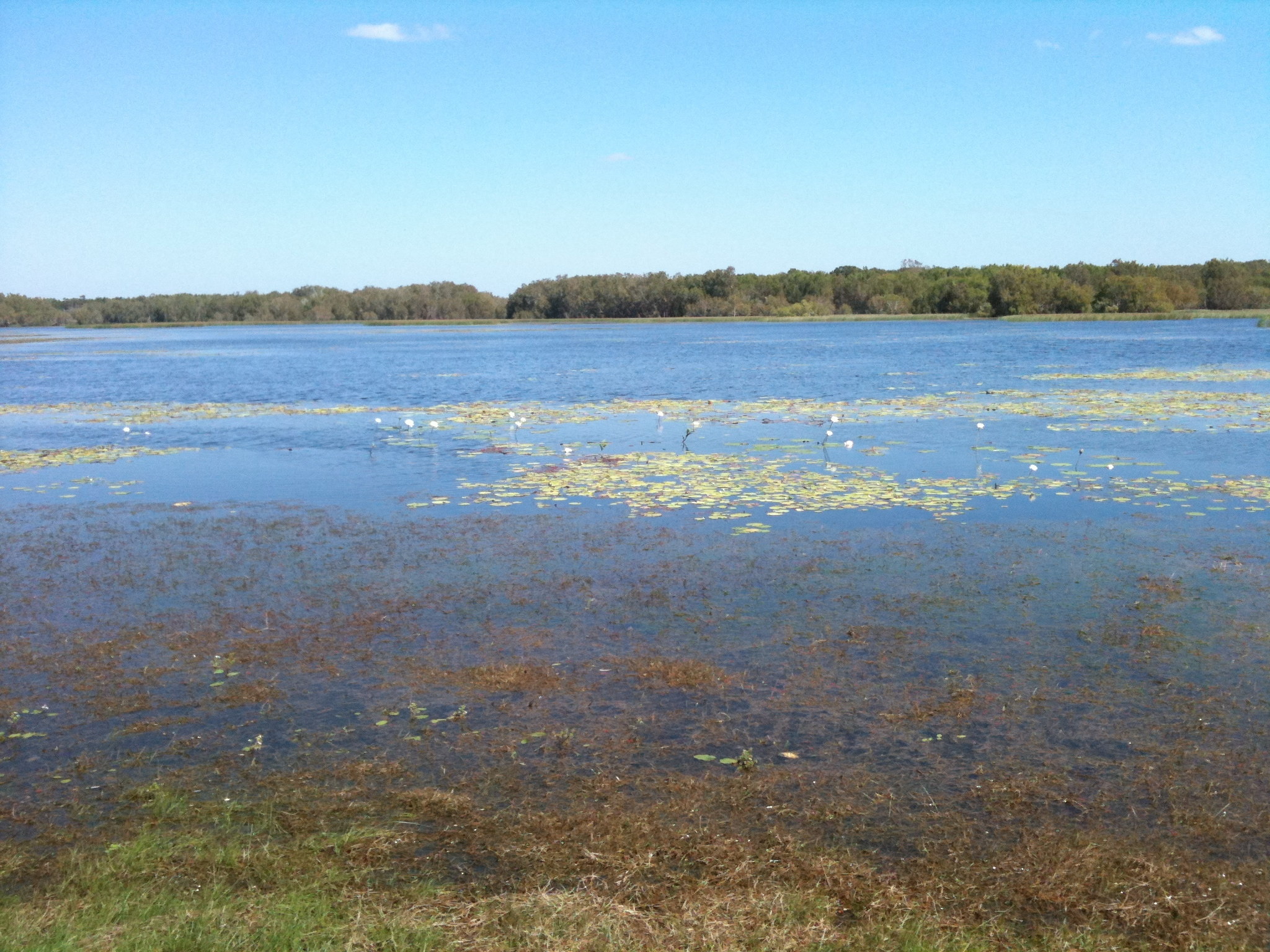
- Rinyirru National Park, July 2011
- Location: Queensland
- Nearest city: Cooktown
- Area: 5,370 km^{2} (2,070 sq mi)
- Established: 1979
- Governing body: Queensland Parks and Wildlife Service
- Website: Official website

Rinyirru National Park map

Rinyirru (Lakefield) is a national park in Lakefield, Shire of Cook, Queensland, Australia, 1,707 km northwest of Brisbane and 340 km north-west of Cairns by road, on Cape York Peninsula. At 5,370 km^{2} (2,073 sq. miles) - making it bigger than Trinidad and Tobago and almost as big as Brunei - Rinyirru is the second largest park in Queensland and a popular place for fishing and camping.

The park stretches from Princess Charlotte Bay in the north to the town of Laura. It covers 537,000 ha of land, and includes sections of the Normanby River, Morehead River and North Kennedy Rivers, as well as lakes, billabongs and wetlands. There are more than 100 permanent riverine lagoons in the park.

There is one main, unsealed road (Lakefield Road) through the park but it is impassable through much of the wet season, when the park closes. There is a ranger station within the park which can assist with information or give help in emergencies.

== Climate ==
From early December to April is the wettest time in Rinyirru National Park. The average rainfall is about 1,200 mm. At times monsoon rains fall and cause the rivers to overspill their banks. In the distinctly drier months, the plains of the Laura Basin become parched and dusty.

== History ==
Before Europeans settled in the area around the 1870s, numerous Aboriginal clans occupied the fertile coastal strip. Aboriginal cultural heritage sites are located at Hann and Kalpowar crossings.

The first explorer to visit the area by land was Edmund Kennedy. Another early explorer of the region was William Hann. Laura Homestead was established in 1892 or earlier and is one of the oldest, intact, pastoral homesteads in the region. Lakefield Station, extending for over 150 kilometres from Musgrave Station in the north on Princess Charlotte Bay to the northern boundary of Laura Station to the south, an area of about 25,000 km^{2} (9,700 sq mi), ran about 1,500–2,000 head of Hereford-cross cattle until about 1964 when its owner, Tarrawinebar Agency, introduced Brahmain bulls into the herd in an effort to improve the breeding stock. The bulls were offloaded from a Scandanvian cattle ship at a dock on Princess Charlotte Bay near the northern border of the Station. Management was also attempting to improve pastures by seeding Townsville lucerne and dividing the station into stock management blocks by means of an extensive fencing program. In 1960 the original Lakefield Homestead was replaced by a new homestead, located a few hundreds of metres to the southeast, and in 1965 the old stockmen's quarters were replaced by a new building further to the east, nearer to the airstrip and the horse paddock. At that time the station supported five Caucasian stockmen and several Aboriginal stockmen and their families.

Princess Charlotte Bay in the north to Lakefield was gazetted in 1979, after the Queensland Government purchased several cattle stations, including Lakefield, the previous year. In 2005, a Townsville man was attacked and killed by a crocodile while he was canoeing with his wife at the Midway waterhole on the Normanby River.

== Fauna ==
The park is known for its populations of waterbirds such as the brolga, sarus crane, black-necked stork, comb-crested jacana and magpie geese. In the woodland and grassland area the agile wallaby, northern nailtail wallaby and Australian bustard may be found.

Threatened species which are found in the park include the golden-shouldered parrot, star finch, red goshawk, Lakeland Downs mouse and the spectacled hare-wallaby. Termite mounds are scattered across the park, particularly on the Niland Plain.

Reptiles, amphibians and mammals are also present, sometimes in quite large numbers. Mammals include, dingoes, wallabies, possums, foxes, feral cattle and wild pigs. Wild pigs sometimes reach such large numbers that they have to be culled. Reptiles are represented by numerous species of snakes, with the brown snake, death adder and the taipan being the three most dangerous. All three are highly venomous and potentially lethal. Monitor lizards (goannas) are also fairly numerous, especially the yellow-spotted monitor Varanus panoptes. Frogs are also fairly numerous, especially the green tree frog, Litoria caerulea, but there are many others. The introduced cane toad is present in the park, and may be competing with some of the native animals. Other introduced species, such as pigs, cattle and horse roam throughout the park.

Tourists should keep well aware that there are numerous crocodiles in the various waterways of the park. The park has the largest concentration of crocodiles in Queensland. There are two species of crocodile in the park: fresh and saltwater, both of which are native to northern Australia. The freshwater variety are not as big and seek smaller prey and are not so dangerous to humans. The saltwater species can be very large and are potentially dangerous to humans.

== Flora ==
The dominant vegetation in the park is eucalypt woodland and gallery forest associated with waterways. There are a variety of eucalypt species, including bloodwoods and Moreton Bay ash. Wattles are also relatively common including northern black wattle and lancewood (northern golden wattle). Paperbarks are also present especially near water, such as the weeping paperbark. Melaleuca cajuputi is also present and has white bottlebrush-type flowers.

One of the attractive species in the park is the beautiful palm, Corypha utan. They tend to grow close to waterways and cope well with flooding that occurs during the wet season (monsoon). At the end of the life of the palm, which may be 75 to 100 years, it produces a large terminal inflorescence about a metre high with a prodigious number of flowers. One estimate is that they produce one million flowers. When flowering and seeding is complete the palm dies. Regeneration of Corpyha is quite healthy at Rinyirru. The common name for the palm locally is "Kennedy palm" or "Gebang palm". Corypha utan is confined to Northern Australia but is not endemic, being also found in the Philippines and India. Nearer the coast there are also healthy mangrove ecosystems and salt flats.

== Fishing ==
The national park is one of many in Queensland that permit fishing. Fishing is allowed at all campsites and other places with the exception of areas where cultural restrictions apply. Species which may be caught in freshwater include barramundi, tarpon, catfish and tarpin. Saltwater species found in the park include mangrove jack, fingermark, cod, trevally, queenfish and salmon.

== Access ==
It can be accessed by road either through Cooktown or Laura. The easiest route is via the Peninsula Development Road north of Lakefield on the Mulligan Highway. The Starcke Track provides another route more popular with four-wheel drive vehicles. A northern route exists from Coen via the Musgrave Roadhouse.

It is remote and visitors should stock up on food, petrol and other supplies before leaving Cooktown, Lakefield or Laura. Roads may be closed in the park very shortly after rain to stop the road surface suffering damage.

== Camping ==
There are many bush campgrounds throughout the park, and two camps with toilets and showers (Kalpowar Crossing Campground and Hanns Crossing Campground). There are other campsites without facilities across the park. Permits are all obtained via self-registration at the boards located throughout the park. *This has recently changed, no self-registration possible anymore (April 2013)*. Some campsites permit the use of generators that operate at 65 dB or lower. Due to the threat from crocodile attacks camping should not occur within 50 m of any body of water.

== See also ==
- Protected areas of Queensland
