= Protected areas of the Northern Territory =

Protected areas in Australia

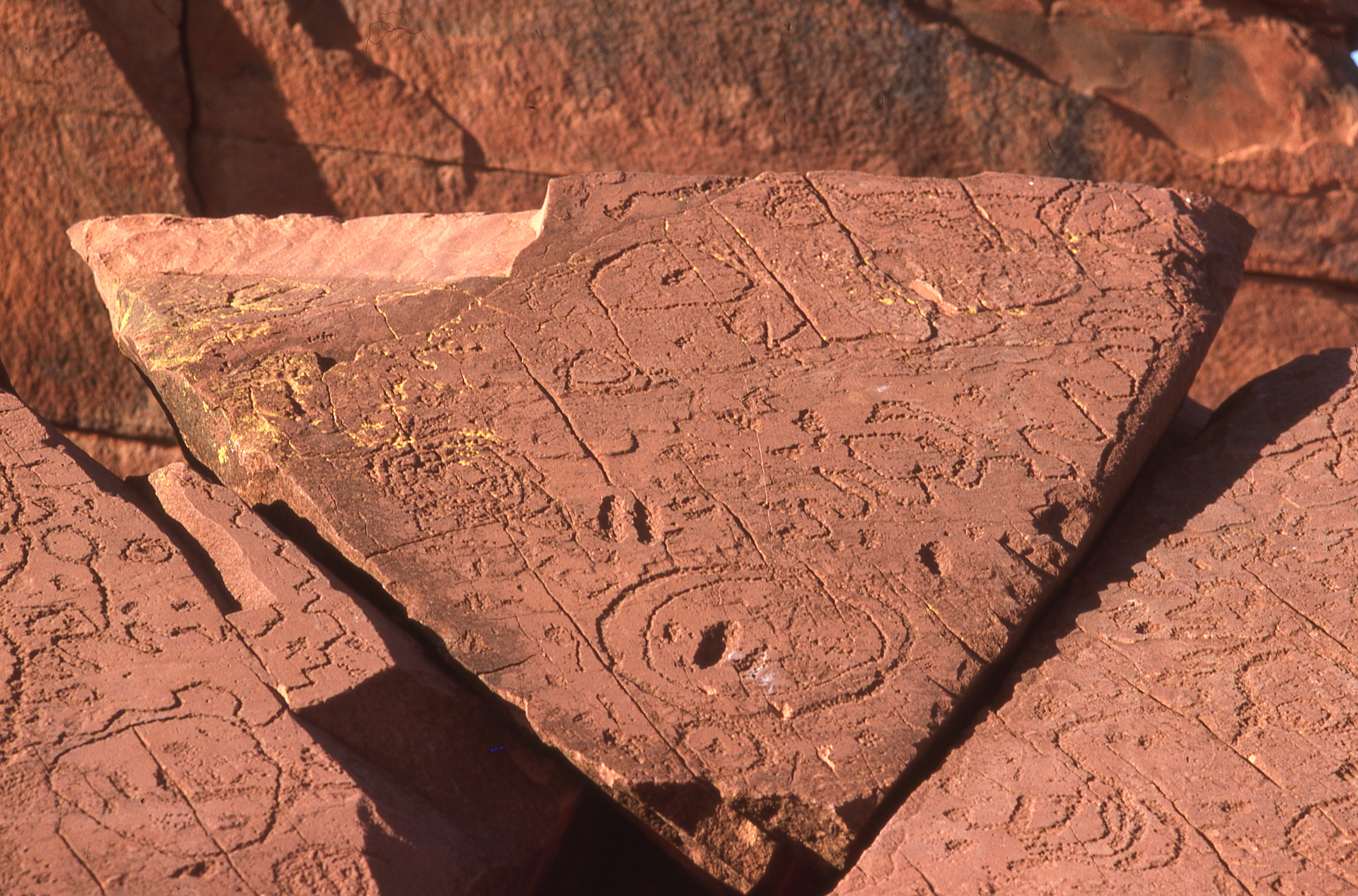
Rock carvings at the Ewaninga Rock Carvings Conservation Reserve

The protected areas of the Northern Territory consists of protected areas managed by the governments of the Northern Territory and Australia and private organisations with a reported total area of 335,527 square kilometres (129,548 sq mi) being 24.8% of the total area of the Northern Territory of Australia.

== Summary by type and jurisdiction ==
As of June 2018, the Parks and Wildlife Commission of the Northern Territory managed 86 ‘parks and reserves’ including 22 that have not been declared with a total reported area of 50,603 square kilometres (19,538 sq mi).

As of 2016, the protected areas within the Australian government jurisdiction included two national parks with a total area of 20,444 square kilometres (7,893 sq mi) and 15 Indigenous Protected Areas with a total area of 260,662 square kilometres (100,642 sq mi).

As of August 2016, there were three private protected areas declared under the Territory Parks and Wildlife Conservation Act with a total area of 1,405 square kilometres (542 sq mi) while in late 2016, another three private protected areas were listed under the National Reserve System with a total area of 1,405 square kilometres (542 sq mi) were listed by the Australian government.

== Northern Territory Government ==
=== Coastal Reserves ===
- Casuarina
- Channel Point
- Shoal Bay

=== Conservation Areas ===
- Adelaide River Foreshore
- Daly River (Mt Nancar)
- Douglas River / Daly River Esplanade
- Harrison Dam
- Melacca Swamp
- Oolloo Crossing
- Stray Creek
- Tree Point

=== Conservation Covenants ===
- Lake Woods
- Newry Station Gouldian Finch
- Longreach Waterhole

=== Conservation Reserves ===
- Anna's Reservoir
- Black Jungle/Lambells Lagoon
- Blackmore River
- Bullwaddy
- Channel Island
- Caranbirini
- Connells Lagoon
- Corroboree Rock
- Fogg Dam
- Henbury Meteorites
- Illamurta Springs
- Karlu Karlu / Devils Marbles
- Kintore Caves
- Knuckey Lagoons
- Kuyunba
- Mac Clark (Acacia peuce)
- Napwerte/Ewaninga Rock Carvings
- Native Gap
- Rainbow Valley
- Tnorala (Gosse Bluff)
- Vernon Islands
- Woodgreen

=== Historical Reserves ===
- Alice Springs Telegraph Station
- Arltunga
- Attack Creek
- Barrow Creek Telegraph Station
- Central Mount Stuart
- Chambers Pillar
- Gregory's Tree
- Heavitree Gap Police Station
- John Flynn
- John Flynn's Grave
- Ryan Well
- Tennant Creek Telegraph Station
- Victoria River Depot

=== Hunting Reserves ===
- Howard Springs

=== Management Agreement Areas ===
- Buffalo Creek
- Channel Island
- Junction Reserve

=== Marine Parks ===
- Arafura
- Arnhem
- Limmen
- Wessel

=== National Parks ===
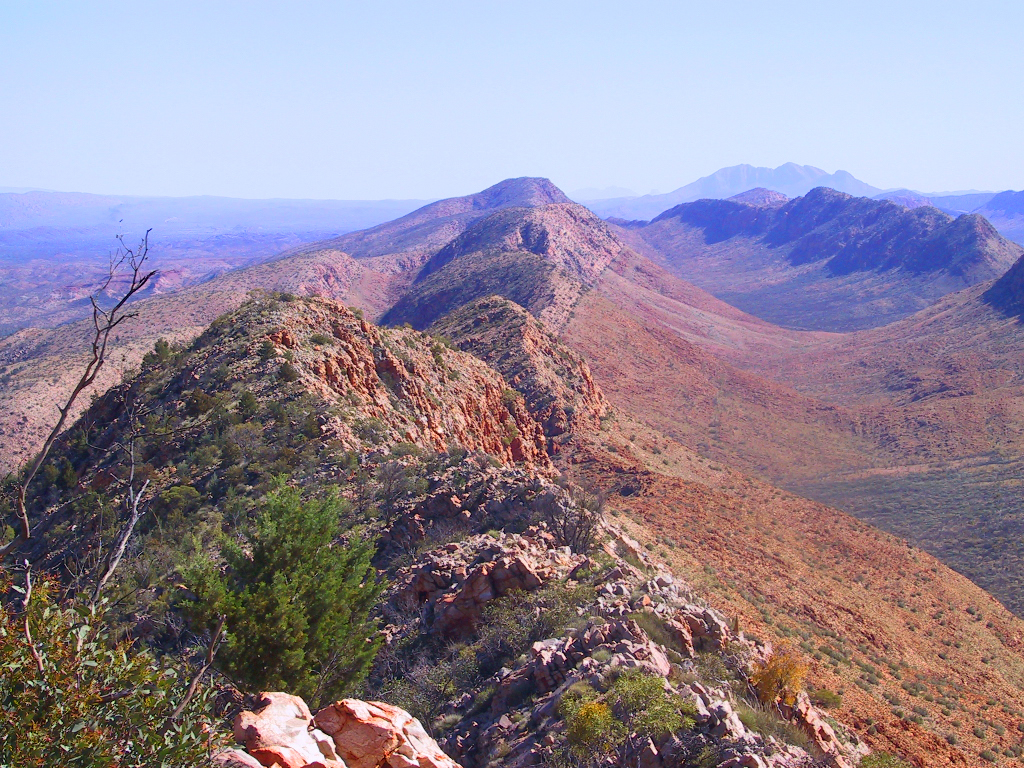
From the Larapinta Trail in Tjoritja / West MacDonnell National Park

- Barranyi (North Island)
- Charles Darwin
- Djukbinj
- Dulcie Range
- Elsey
- Finke Gorge
- Garig Gunak Barlu
- Iytwelepenty / Davenport Range
- Judbarra / Gregory
- Keep River
- Limmen
- Litchfield
- Mary River
- Nitmiluk
- Tjoritja / West MacDonnell
- Watarrka

=== Nature Parks ===
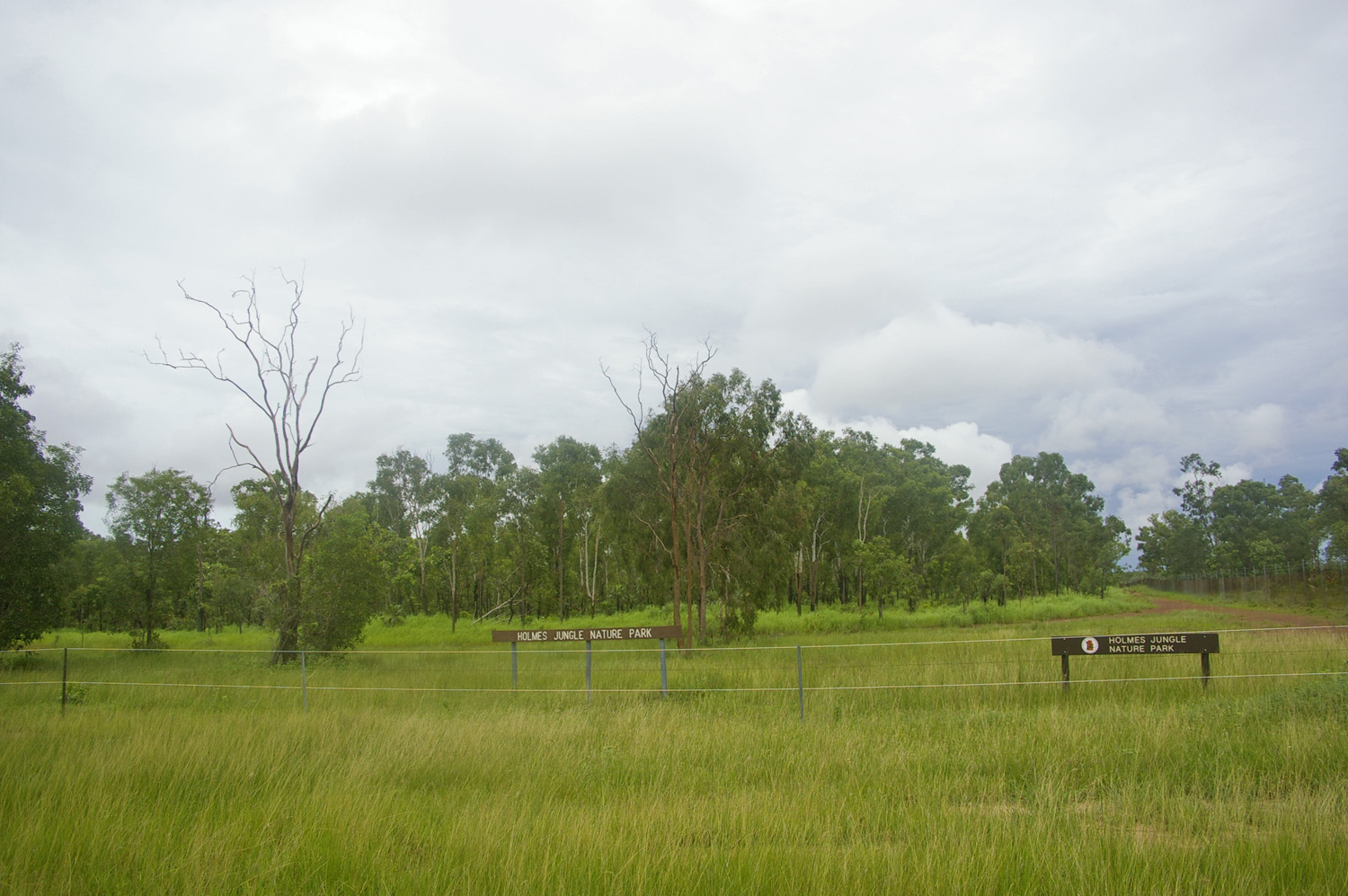
Holmes Jungle Nature Park

- Berry Springs
- Butterfly Gorge
- Cutta Cutta Caves
- Giwining / Flora River
- Holmes Jungle
- Howard Springs
- Katherine Low Level
- Leaning Tree Lagoon
- Mataranka Pool
- N'Dhala Gorge
- Ruby Gap
- Trephina Gorge
- Umbrawarra Gorge
- Yeperenye/Emily and Jessie Gaps

=== Protected Areas ===
- Ilparpa Swamp Wildlife
- Joint Geological / Geophysical Research Station

=== Other places ===
- Alice Springs Desert Park
- George Brown Darwin Botanic Gardens
- Leanyer Recreation Park
- Manton Dam Recreation Area
- Owen Springs Reserve
- Territory Wildlife Park
- Wearyan River (Manangoora) Cycad Site
- Windows on the Wetlands

== Australian government ==
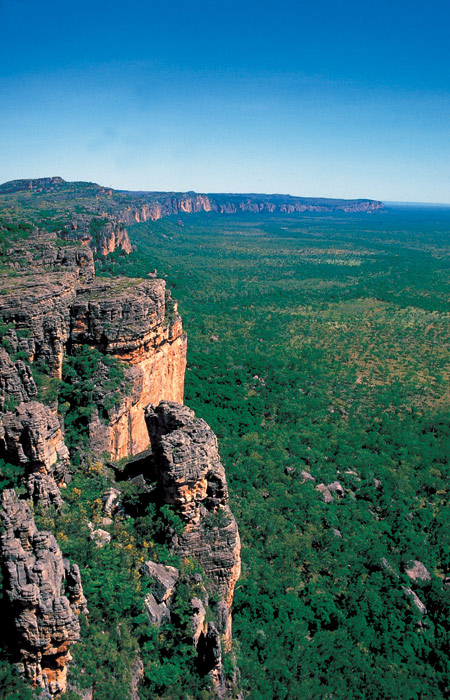
Kakadu National Park escarpment

=== Indigenous Protected Areas ===
The following Indigenous Protected Areas have been established in the Northern Territory:

- Angas Downs
- Anindilyakwa
- Crocodile Islands Maringa
- Dhimurru
- Djelk
- GanaIanga-Mindibirrina
- Katiti Petermann
- Laynhapuy
- Marri-Jabin
- Marthakal
- Northern Tanami
- South-East Arnhem Land
- Southern Tanami
- Wardaman
- Warddeken
- Yanyuwa

=== National parks ===
The following national parks are managed by the Director of National Parks on the behalf of the Australian government and indigenous land owners:

- Kakadu
- Uluru-Kata Tjuta

== Private protected areas ==
=== Northern Territory jurisdiction ===
See Conservation Covenants above

=== Australian Wildlife Conservancy sanctuaries ===
Australian Wildlife Conservancy owns and operates the following private protected areas in the Northern Territory:

- Fish River Station
- Henbury Station (in progress)
- Newhaven
- Pungalina-Seven Emu
- Wongalara

== See also ==
- Protected areas of Australia
- National parks of the Northern Territory
- Protected areas managed by the Australian government
