= Howard Springs Hunting Reserve =

Protected area in the Northern Territory, Australia

- IUCN category VI (protected area with sustainable use of natural resources)
- Location within Northern Territory
- Location: Northern Territory, Howard Springs
- Nearest city: Palmerston City
- Coordinates: 12°25′38″S 131°04′07″E
- Area: 16.05 km^{2} (6.20 sq mi)
- Established: 11 July 1984
- Governing body: Parks and Wildlife Commission of the Northern Territory
- Website: Official website

Howard Springs Hunting Reserve is a protected area in the Northern Territory of Australia located in the locality of Howard Springs.

The hunting reserve occupies land in section 4076. This land is part of a larger parcel of land under the protection of the Territory Parks and Wildlife Conservation Act and extends from the reserve's south to its immediate north and east and ultimately to the shoreline of Shoal Bay. The land to the south has been gazetted as the Howard Springs Nature Park while land to the north and the east has been gazetted as the Shoal Bay Coastal Reserve. The land on which the hunting reserve and neighbouring protected areas are located on is part of area called the "Howard Sand Plains", which is considered by the Northern Territory Government as a "Site of Conservation Significance".

The hunting reserve was established in 1984. It was managed in conjunction with the Howard Springs Nature Park from 1992 to 2016.

The right to hunt particular bird species within the reserve is available only to permit-holders usually during the fourth quarter of the calendar year (i.e. October to December), but may change from year to year. Hunted species is limited to grey teal, hardhead duck, magpie goose, maned duck, Pacific black duck, plumed whistling duck, pink-eared duck and wandering whistling duck. Firearms and weapons used for hunting are restricted to lever-action shotguns and bows. The use of lead shot in shotgun cartridges is illegal in the Northern Territory. Research as early as 1991 found that magpie geese in the hunting reserve and nearby sites had toxic lead concentrations in their livers due to the indigestion of lead shot.

The hunting reserve is categorised as an IUCN Category VI protected area.

== See also ==
- Protected areas of the Northern Territory
