= Shoal Bay Coastal Reserve =

Protected area in the Northern Territory, Australia

- IUCN category VI (protected area with sustainable use of natural resources)
- Location within Northern Territory
- Location: Northern Territory
- Nearest city: Darwin
- Coordinates: 12°22′16″S 131°05′51″E
- Area: 123.0 km^{2} (47.5 sq mi)
- Established: 2000
- Governing body: Parks and Wildlife Commission of the Northern Territory
- Website: Official website

Shoal Bay Coastal Reserve is a protected area in the Northern Territory of Australia.

It is situated approximately 35 kilometres (22 mi) east of Darwin and protects a large area of eucalypt woodland and saline wetlands. The area is bounded by the Howard River to the west and Gunn Point to the east with all of Shoal Bay being found within the reserve, it also shares a common boundary with the Howard Springs Hunting Reserve and the Tree Point Conservation Area.

It consists of extensive sand and mud-flats with much of the bay exposed at low tide. Numerous swamps surround the bay with remnants of a monsoon vine forest. Patches of rainforest are also found around the margins of the tidal area. The tidal flats are a known feeding and roosting area for migratory shorebirds in their non-breeding season. Aggregations of up to 5,000 waterbirds can be found in freshwater areas when the larger areas further south are dry.

The area is home to three threatened species of plant: Cycas armstrongii, Ptychosperma macarthurii and Utricularia dunstaniae. The area is also home to eleven threatened species of animal including Australian bustard, red goshawk, northern quoll, flatback turtle and dwarf sawfish.

The traditional owners of the area are the Larrakia people. Several large shell middens left by these people can be found in the upland intrusions into the swamp areas.

The coastal reserve is categorised as an IUCN Category VI protected area.

== See also ==
- Protected areas of the Northern Territory
