= Shoal Bay =

Shoal Bay may refer to:

== Places ==
=== Australia ===
==== Northern Territory ====
- Shoal Bay (Darwin), a bay
- Shoal Bay, Northern Territory, a locality
- Shoal Bay Coastal Reserve, a protected area
- Shoal Bay Receiving Station, a defence facility
- Shoal Bay Waste Management Facility, a facility in the locality of Holmes, Northern Territory

==== Elsewhere ====
- Shoal Bay, New South Wales
- Shoal Bay (Princess Royal Harbour), Western Australia

=== Canada ===
- Shoal Bay, British Columbia
- Shoal Bay (Newfoundland and Labrador), Canada
- Shoal Bay, Newfoundland and Labrador, Canada
- Shoal Bay (Freshwater Bay), Newfoundland and Labrador, Canada

=== New Zealand ===
- Shoal Bay, New Zealand, an arm of the Waitematā Harbour in Auckland

== See also ==
- Shoalwater Bay
