= Connells Lagoon Conservation Reserve =

- IUCN category Ia (strict nature reserve)
- Location within Northern Territory
- Location: Northern Territory
- Nearest city: Tennant Creek
- Coordinates: 18°53′26″S 136°32′53″E
- Area: 258.90 km^{2} (99.96 sq mi)
- Established: 1994
- Governing body: Parks and Wildlife Commission of the Northern Territory
- Website: https://nt.gov.au/leisure/parks-reserves/find-a-park-to-visit/connells-lagoon-conservation-reserve

Connells Lagoon Conservation Reserve, also known as Dalgajini, is a protected area in the Northern Territory of Australia.

It is situated approximately 260 kilometres (162 mi) north east of Tennant Creek and 350 kilometres (217 mi) south east of Elliott on the eastern boundary of Brunette Downs Station. The area is found in the middle of the Barkly Tableland and was established primarily to conserve Mitchell grassland communities.

The landscape is predominantly flat with watercourses found in the northern areas where small stands of trees are found. Bluebush is also found in the wettest areas. The area contains black soil plains with cracking clays underlain by flat beds of Middle Cambrian Camooweal dolomite. On the higher areas gravelly red-earth is found. The lagoon from which the reserve takes its name is found just outside the boundary fence.

A biological survey was conducted in the area in 1982 and researchers found 189 plant species, 53 species of bird, 19 reptile species and 9 species of mammal. Several of the birds are endangered including the flock bronzewing pigeon, red-chested button-quail, Australian bustard and the pictorella mannikin.

The traditional owners of the lands are the Wambaya people, and it is part of the larger area of Rumburriya semi-moiety land known as Mangurinji. The area is significant to the Wambaya as ancestral beings known as Mangaya that feature in the Dreamtime created several features in the area.

Pastoralists arrived in the area in the 1880s and the area was used as a stock reserve along the Barkly stock route, which was heavily trafficked up until the 1960s when road transport replaced overlanding. Cattle and fire have been excluded from the area since 1984 when the area was gazetted and fenced.

In 2002, the conservation reserve was listed on the now-defunct Register of the National Estate.

== See also ==
- Protected areas of the Northern Territory
