= Kuyunba Conservation Reserve =

Protected area in the Northern Territory, Australia

- IUCN category V (protected landscape/seascape)
- Location within Northern Territory
- Location: Northern Territory
- Coordinates: 23°48′33″S 133°46′42″E
- Area: 6.29 km^{2} (2.43 sq mi)
- Established: 7 May 1970
- Governing body: Parks and Wildlife Commission of the Northern Territory

Kuyunba Conservation Reserve is a protected area in the Northern Territory of Australia.

It is located approximately 15 kilometres (9 mi) south west of Alice Springs and 1,520 kilometres (944 mi) south of Darwin.

The threatened black-footed rock wallaby is known to inhabit the area.

The conservation reserve is categorised as an IUCN Category V protected area.

== See also ==
- Protected areas of the Northern Territory
