= Giwining / Flora River Nature Park =

Protected area in Northern Territory, Australia

- IUCN category V (protected landscape/seascape)
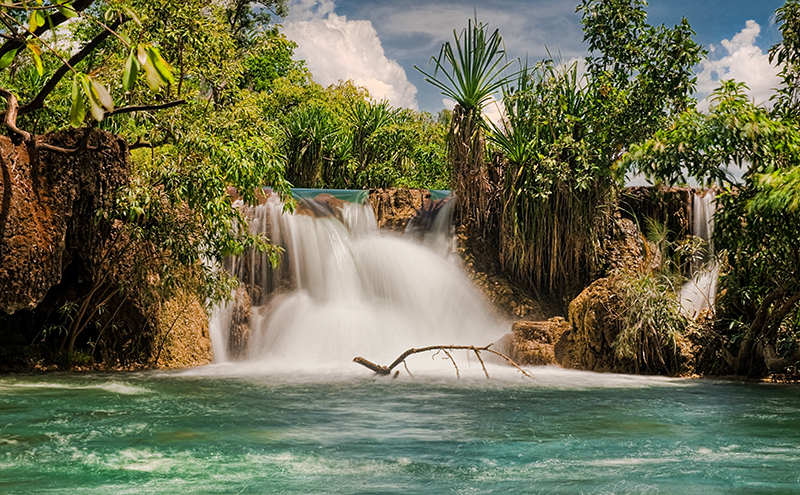
- The Tindall Limestone at Giwinging, 2014

- Location within Northern Territory
- Location: Northern Territory, Delamere
- Nearest city: Darwin
- Coordinates: 14°44′02″S 131°36′46″E
- Area: 78 km^{2} (30 sq mi)
- Established: 7 July 1993
- Governing body: Parks and Wildlife Commission of the Northern Territory; Traditional owners
- Website: Official website

Giwining / Flora River Nature Park is a protected area in the Northern Territory of Australia. It surrounds a 25 kilometres (16 mi) section of the bank of the Flora River and the many springs and tufa dams that feed into it. It covers a land area of 7,824 hectares (19,330 acres).

It is located 135 kilometres (84 mi) south-west of Katherine and 448 kilometres (278 mi) south of Darwin.

The traditional owners of the area are the Wardaman people who jointly manage the reserve alongside the Northern Territory Government.

== Description ==
The Giwing / Flora River Nature Park is a popular location for fishing, particularly for barramundi. However, due to the number of saltwater crocodiles there swimming and boating are not allowed.

Two of the most popular places to visit in the park are Kathleen Falls and Djarrung Falls both of which have short walks to access.

== See also ==
- Protected areas of the Northern Territory
