= Kintore Caves Conservation Reserve =

Protected area in the Northern Territory, Australia

- IUCN category V (protected landscape/seascape)
- Location within Northern Territory
- Location: Northern Territory
- Coordinates: 14.4147°S 132.1635°E
- Area: 423 ha (1,050 acres)
- Established: 1965
- Governing body: Parks and Wildlife Commission of the Northern Territory

Kintore Caves Conservation Reserve is a protected area in the Northern Territory of Australia.

It is located approximately 12 kilometres (7 mi) west of Katherine and 330 kilometres (205 mi) south east of Darwin.

The area is made up of karst limestone and has an extensive network of caves that contain rare fauna and evidence of a long history of human occupation. The conservation reserve shares a boundary to the north with the Northern Territory Rural College and to the south with private property zoned for rural use.

== See also ==
- Protected areas of the Northern Territory
