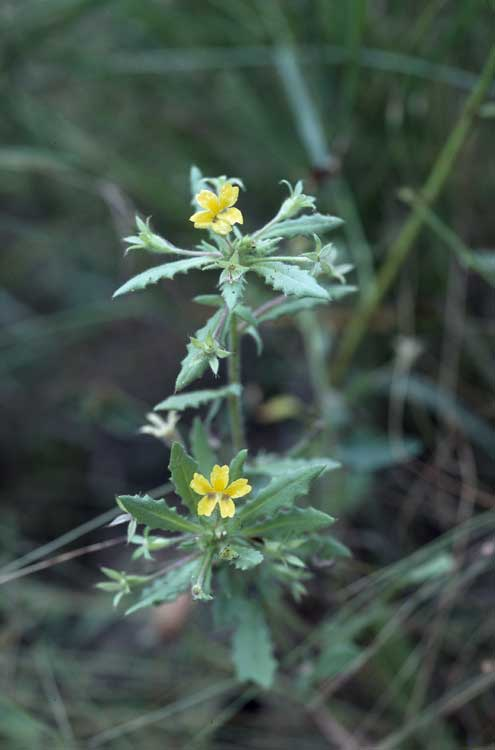
- At Black Jungle Conservation Reserve

Scientific classification
- Kingdom: Plantae
- Clade: Tracheophytes
- Clade: Angiosperms
- Clade: Eudicots
- Clade: Asterids
- Order: Asterales
- Family: Goodeniaceae
- Genus: Goodenia
- Species: G. neglecta

Binomial name
- Goodenia neglecta (Carolin) Carolin

Synonyms
- Calogyne neglecta Carolin

= Goodenia neglecta =

Species of plant

Goodenia neglecta is a species of flowering plant in the family Goodeniaceae and is endemic to the Northern Territory of Australia. It is an ascending, weak-stemmed herb with toothed, egg-shaped leaves and racemes of yellow flowers.

== Description ==
Goodenia neglecta is an ascending, weak-stemmed herb that typically grows to a height of up to 30 cm (12 in). It has egg-shaped leaves with the narrower end towards the base, leaves at the base of the plant, 15–60 mm (0.59–2.36 in) long and 3–20 mm (0.12–0.79 in) wide with teeth on the edges. Leaves on the stem are similar but decrease in size up the stem. The flowers are arranged in racemes up to 250 mm (9.8 in) long with leaf-like bracts, each flower on a pedicel 2–3 mm (0.079–0.118 in) long. The sepals are oblong to elliptic, about 3 mm (0.12 in) long, the corolla yellow, 10–15 mm (0.39–0.59 in) long. The lower lobes of the corolla are 4–5 mm (0.16–0.20 in) long with wings about 1 mm (0.039 in) wide. Flowering mainly occurs from February to April and the fruit is a more or less spherical capsule about 3 mm (0.12 in) in diameter.

== Taxonomy and naming ==
The species was first formally described in 1979 by Roger Charles Carolin who gave it the name Calogyne neglecta in the journal Brunonia from specimens he collected on Mudgenbury Station in 1968. In 1990, Carolin changed the name to Goodenia neglecta in the journal Telopea.

== Distribution and habitat ==
This goodenia grows in damp places in woodland in Arnhem Land.

== Conservation status ==
Goodenia neglecta is classified as "least concern" under the Northern Territory Government Territory Parks and Wildlife Conservation Act 1976.
