= Corroboree Rock Conservation Reserve =

Protected area in the Northern Territory, Australia

- IUCN category V (protected landscape/seascape)
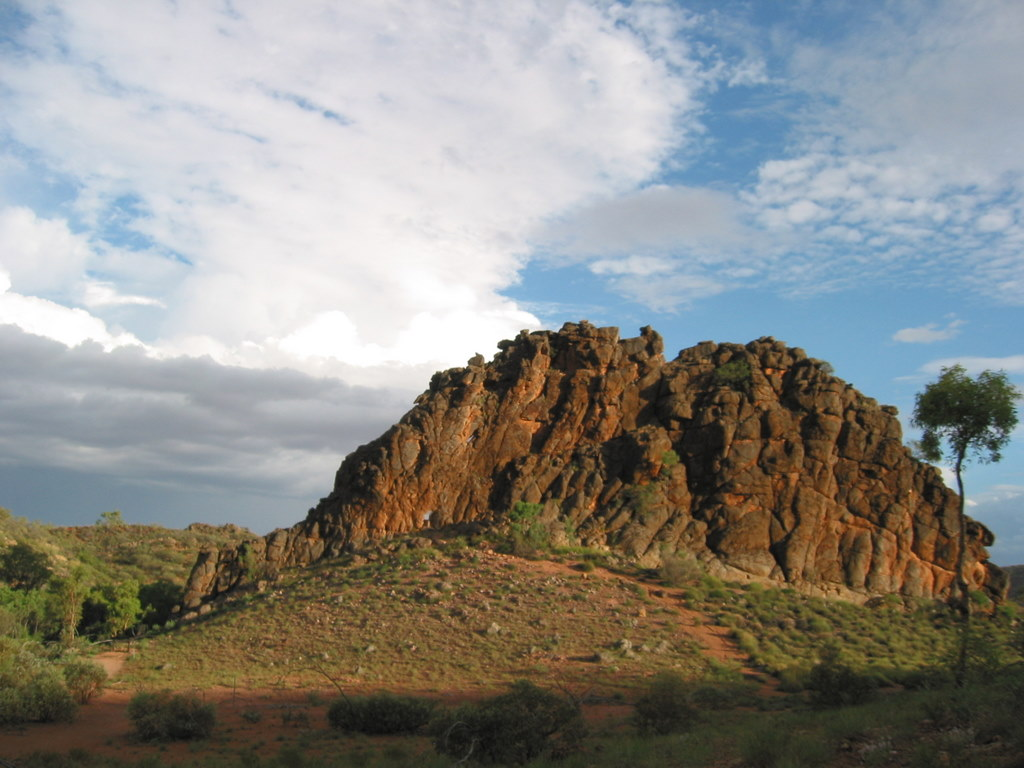
- Corroboree Rock

- Location within Northern Territory
- Location: Northern Territory
- Coordinates: 23°40′52″S 134°12′57″E
- Area: 7 ha (17 acres)
- Established: 1962
- Visitors: 15,000 (in 2011)
- Governing body: Parks and Wildlife Commission of the Northern Territory

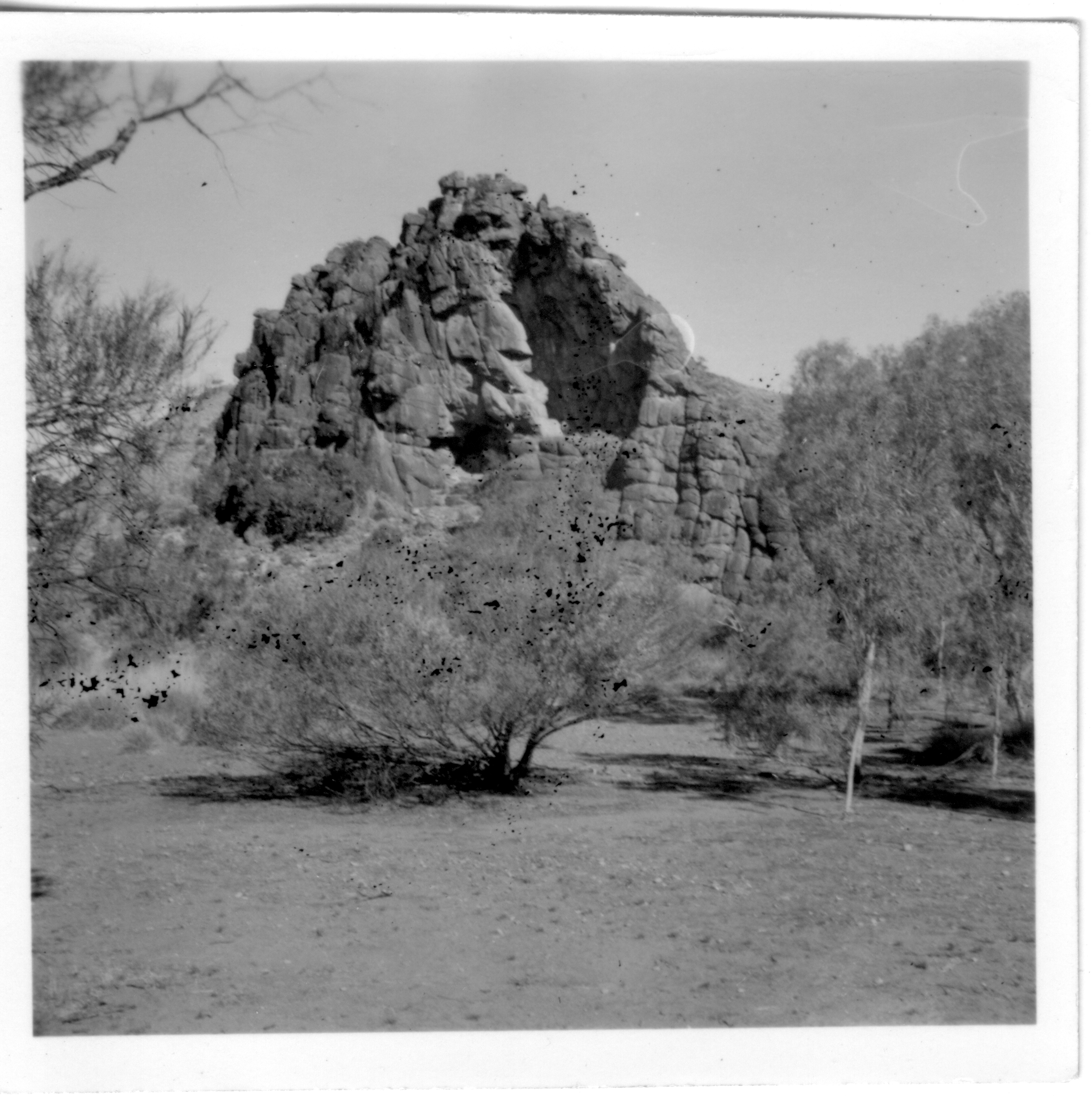
Corroboree Rock, c1955

Corroboree Rock Conservation Reserve is a protected area in the Northern Territory of Australia located about 42 kilometres (26 mi) east of Alice Springs in the East MacDonnell Ranges. It is a sacred site to the Eastern Arrente people who are its Traditional Owners.

The reserve is surrounded by the Undoolya pastoral lease which operates as a cattle station.

The reserve takes its name from a column of grey dolomite of great significance to the local Aboriginal people, it is known to Europeans as Corroborree rock but is known in the Eastern Arrernte language as Pwenye and this name is also used to describe themselves as being part of their country. The rock is part of the Bitter Springs formation that was deposited in salt lakes 800 million years ago.

Flora found on the reserve include spinifex and senna on the ridges, with bloodwood, Supplejack, Red Mallee and Whitewood are found around the base of the rock.

== See also ==
- Protected areas of the Northern Territory
