= Dulcie Range National Park =

National park in Australia

- IUCN category II (national park)
- Dulcie Range National Park N.T.

- Location within Northern Territory
- Location: Northern Territory
- Nearest city: Alice Springs
- Coordinates: 22°32′14″S 135°32′37″E
- Area: 191.12 km^{2} (73.79 sq mi)
- Established: 1 March 1991
- Governing body: Parks and Wildlife Commission of the Northern Territory

Dulcie Range is a national park in the Northern Territory of Australia, 220 km north-east of Alice Springs and 1235 km southeast of territorial capital of Darwin. The park lies along the south-western edge of Dulcie Range. It was first declared in 1991 and again in July 2012. A draft Plan of Management was published by the Parks and Wildlife Commission of the Northern Territory in May 2001.

== History ==
The first recorded European visitor to the area was Charles Winnecke in 1878. In 1916 the chief surveyor of the Northern Territory, T. E. Day surveyed the range and named it Dulcie after one of his daughters. Around 1920 an early pastoral lease was taken out at Old Huckitta station, the remains of which are within the southern boundary of the park. There was an established population of traditional aboriginal Akarre Arrernte people, evidenced by numerous rock art sites in the Dulcie Range. A plentiful supply of food resources and water supported the clans.

== Description ==
The Range is a plateau of sandstone standing from 50 to 150 metres above the surrounding plain in the Georgina Basin. Typical of the plain's flora are mulga shrub-lands, mallee eucalypt, open woodland and spinifex. The plateau comprises steep sided cliffs, gorges and scree of the predominant Dulcie Sandstone, a Devonian-aged fossiliferous formation, with numerous watercourses. Recorded in the park are 105 species of birds, 32 of reptiles, 2 of frogs and 3 of fish.

== See also ==
- Protected areas of the Northern Territory
- Horn Expedition led by C. Winnecke
- Huckitta (meteorite)
- Boxhole crater
