= Koolpinyah =

Koolpinyah may refer to:

- Electoral division of Koolpinyah, a former electorate in the Northern Territory of Australia
- Koolpinyah, Northern Territory, a locality
- Koolpinyah ephemerovirus, a species of virus – refer List of virus species
- Koolpinyah H.S. E.L.G, a World War II airfield in Australia – refer List of Royal Australian Air Force installations
- Koolpinyah Station, a pastoral lease in Australia – refer Koolpinyah, Northern Territory
- Koolpinyah threadtail, a species of Australian damselfly
