= Caranbirini Conservation Reserve =

- IUCN category V (protected landscape/seascape)
- Location within Northern Territory
- Location: Northern Territory
- Nearest city: Darwin
- Coordinates: 16°16′33″S 136°05′28″E
- Area: 1,142 ha (4.41 sq mi)
- Established: 1996
- Governing body: Parks and Wildlife Commission of the Northern Territory

Caranbirini Conservation Reserve is a protected area in the Northern Territory of Australia.

It is situated approximately 45 kilometres (28 mi) south of Borroloola and 705 kilometres (438 mi) south east of Darwin. The reserve can be accessed from the Carpentaria Highway.

The reserve contains a large number of habitats within a small area. Sandstone hills and ridges overlook woodlands and riverine vegetation surround a semi-permanent waterhole.

== See also ==
- Protected areas of the Northern Territory
