= Casuarina Coastal Reserve =

- IUCN category V (protected landscape/seascape)
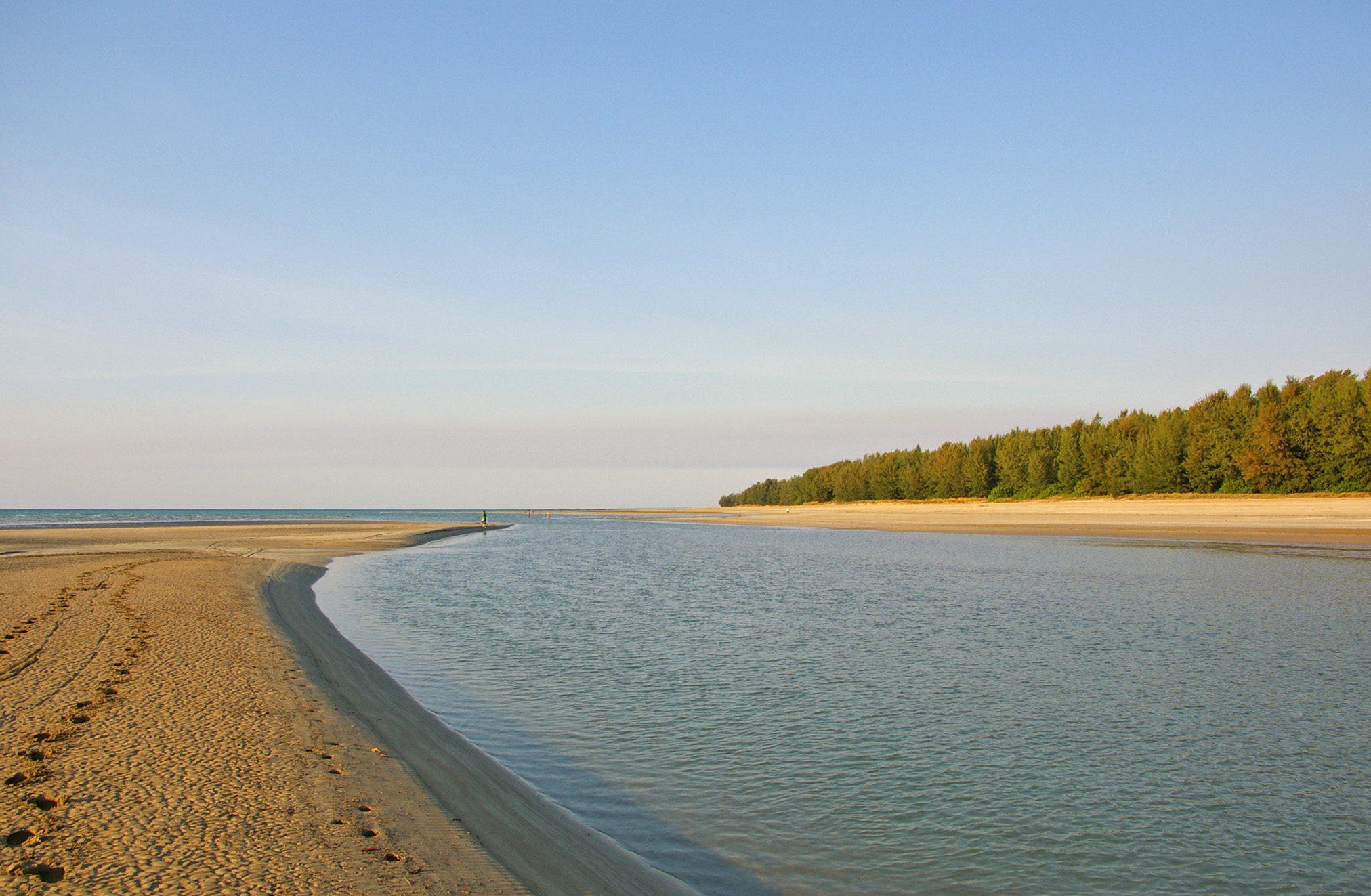
- Estuary Mouth

- Location within Northern Territory
- Location: Northern Territory
- Nearest city: Darwin
- Coordinates: 12°19′54″S 130°53′44″E
- Area: 1,361 ha (5.25 sq mi)
- Established: 1978
- Visitors: 1,062,200 (in 2017)
- Governing body: Parks and Wildlife Commission of the Northern Territory
- Website: http://www.parksandwildlife.nt.gov.au/

Casuarina Coastal Reserve is a protected area in the northern area of Darwin in the Northern Territory of Australia. It is on the traditional Country and waterways of the Larrakia nation.

The reserve comprises approximately 1,361 hectares (3,363 acres) of habitats between Rapid Creek and Buffalo Creek. The area includes 8 kilometres (5 mi) of sandy beaches backed by Casuarina trees and sandstone cliffs. The reserve includes areas of mangroves, paperbark forests and monsoon vine thickets.

The Buffalo Creek boat ramp was built in the early 1970s and the reserve area was acquired by the Commonwealth of Australia in 1978. During the 1980s the boat ramp was upgraded and a carpark and toilets were constructed nearby. In 2001 facilities were upgraded and the second management plan was completed.

Fauna found within the reserve include ospreys, sea eagles, cormorants, gulls and a variety of marine life including crocodiles. Mammals found in the area include the northern brushtail possum and the northern brown bandicoot which both thrive in the forests.

== See also ==
Protected areas of the Northern Territory
