= Knuckey Lagoons Conservation Reserve =

Coordinates: 12°26′08″S 130°56′37″E

- IUCN category IV (habitat/species management area)
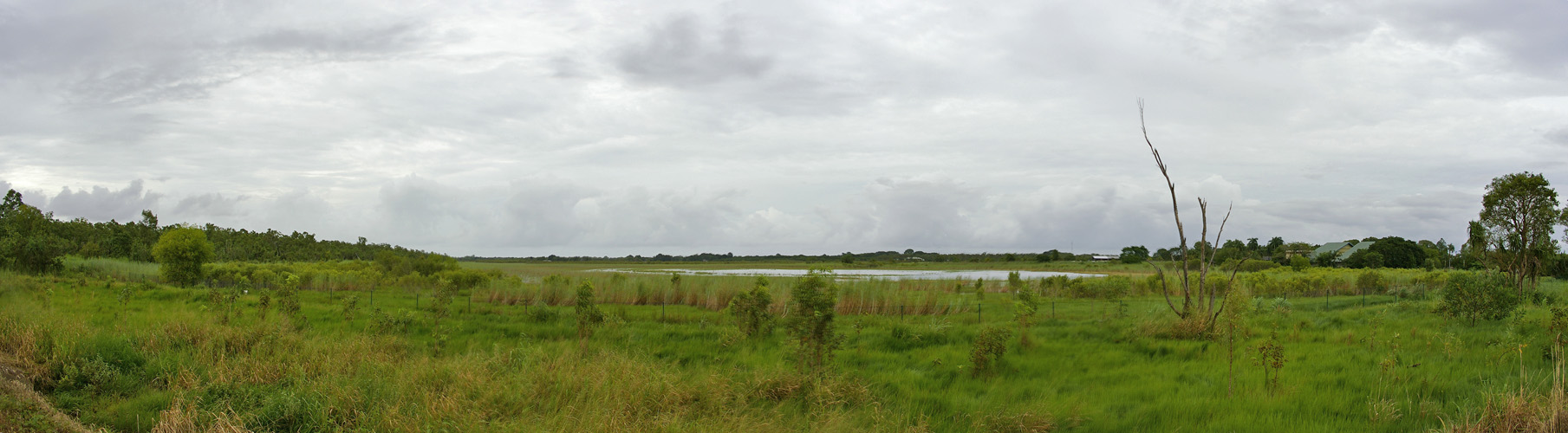
- Knuckey Lagoons Conservation Reserve

- Location within Northern Territory
- Location: Northern Territory
- Area: 125 ha (310 acres)
- Established: 7 July 1966
- Governing body: Parks and Wildlife Commission of the Northern Territory

Knuckey Lagoons Conservation Reserve is a protected area associated with a small wetland located on the outskirts of Darwin and Palmerston in the Northern Territory of Australia.

The area in which the lagoon is located was named in 1869 after surveyor Richard Randall Knuckey by the Surveyor General, George Goyder.
