= Shoal Bay (Darwin) =

- Location within Northern Territory
- Location: Beagle Gulf, Northern Territory
- Coordinates: 12°17′17″S 130°56′28″E
- Type: Bay
- Part of: Beagle Gulf
- Basin countries: Australia
- Settlements: Gunn Point, Murrumujuk, Shoal Bay, Micket Creek, Buffalo Creek and Lee Point (From east to west)

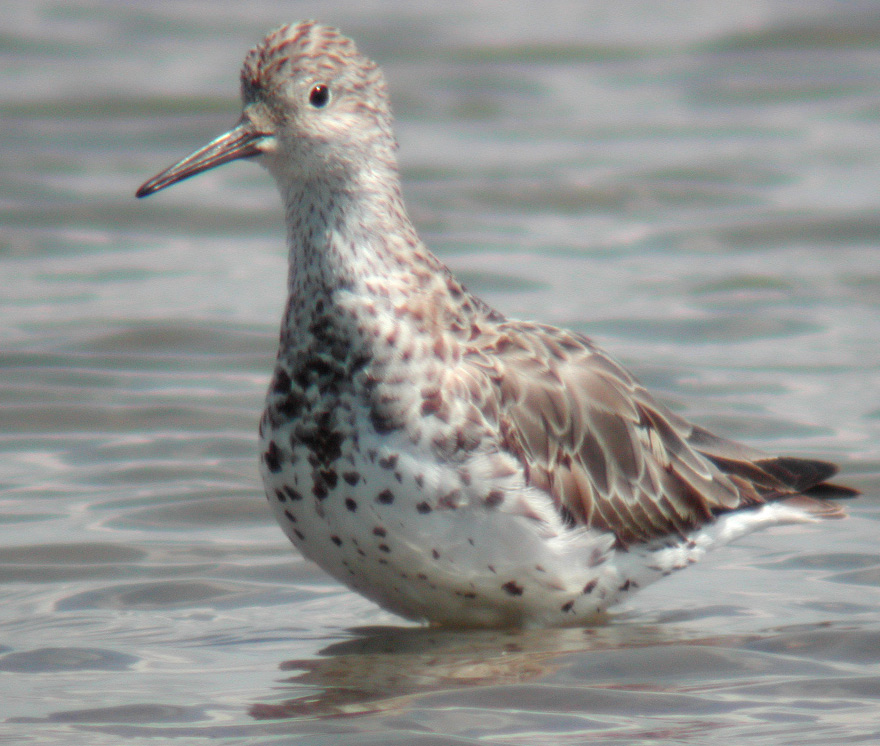
The bay is an important site for great knots

Shoal Bay is a shallow bay lying adjacent to, and north of, the city of Darwin in the Northern Territory of Australia. Encompassing Hope Inlet at its eastern end, it is characterised by extensive areas of intertidal mudflats and mangroves and is an important site for waders, or shorebirds. The bay is situated within the Shoal Bay Coastal Reserve, a protected area that was established in 2000.

Shoal Bay is also known for accommodating the Shoal Bay Receiving Station, a signals-intelligence collection facility that contributes to the NSA's global data collection program.

== Description ==
The bay comprises the lower reaches of the Howard River and several small tidal creeks that drain into Hope Inlet. Much of the bay is exposed at low tide, with about 100 km^{2} (39 sq mi) of tidal mud and sand flats. Unlike most other bays in the Northern Territory, it is not associated with large rivers, nor freshwater coastal floodplains. It does include some swamps and remnants of monsoonal vine forest on the margins. Because of its proximity to Darwin it is threatened by urbanisation and land development. It is also affected by invasive species, frequent fires and largely uncontrolled recreational use of the area.

== Flora and fauna ==
=== Plants ===
Some 61 plant species endemic to the Northern Territory are found around the bay. Of these, three, Cycas armstrongii, Ptychosperma macarthurii and Utricularia dunstaniae, are considered threatened. Two, Utricularia holtzei and Typhonium praetermissum, are only known from the Darwin Coastal bioregion.

=== Birds ===
Some 96 km^{2} (37 sq mi) of the bay has been identified by BirdLife International as an Important Bird Area (IBA) because it supports, with its low-tide feeding habitat and high-tide roosting sites, over 1% of the world population of great knots. Other birds recorded from the bay in significant numbers include black-tailed godwits, greater sand plovers, Terek sandpipers and beach stone-curlews. Chestnut rails inhabit the mangroves.

=== Other animals ===
Apart from birds, threatened animals recorded from the bay and its surrounds include northern quolls, Mertens' water monitors, argus monitors, flatback and olive ridley turtles, dwarf and longcomb sawfish, and Dodd's azure butterflies. Feral pigs and water buffaloes are present. There is an ongoing program to monitor and remove saltwater crocodiles from the bay.
