= Umbrawarra Gorge Nature Park =

Protected area in the Northern Territory, Australia

- IUCN category V (protected landscape/seascape)
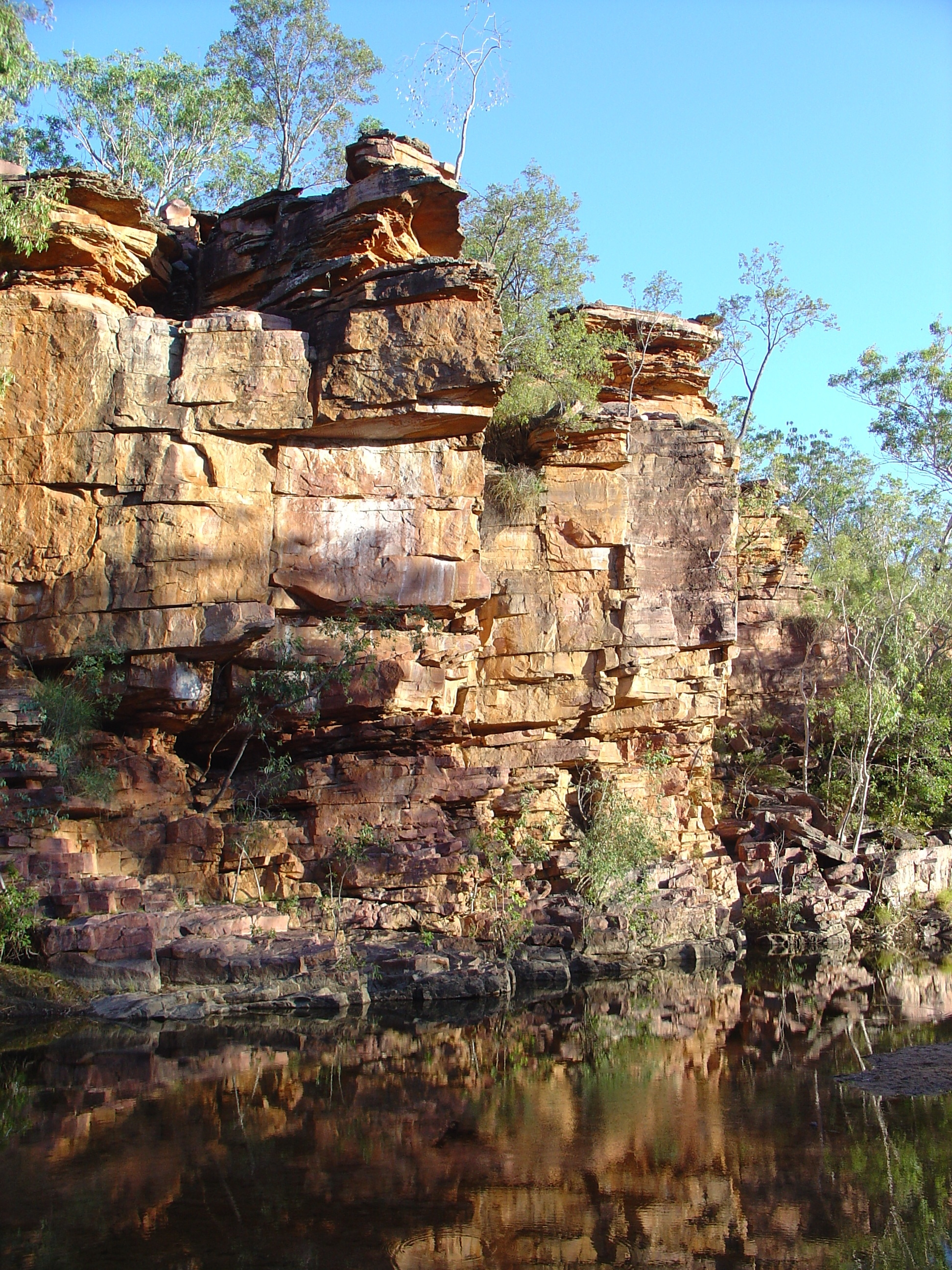
- Umbrawarra Gorge

- Location within Northern Territory
- Location: Northern Territory
- Coordinates: 13°58′17″S 131°41′21″E
- Area: 973 ha (2,400 acres)
- Established: 5 August 1976
- Governing body: Parks and Wildlife Commission of the Northern Territory

Umbrawarra Gorge Nature Park is a protected area in the Northern Territory. It is located 145 km south of Darwin and 115 km west of Katherine.
