= Lake Woods =

- Location within Australia
- Location: Northern Territory, Australia
- Coordinates: 17°50′20″S 133°27′14″E
- Type: lake

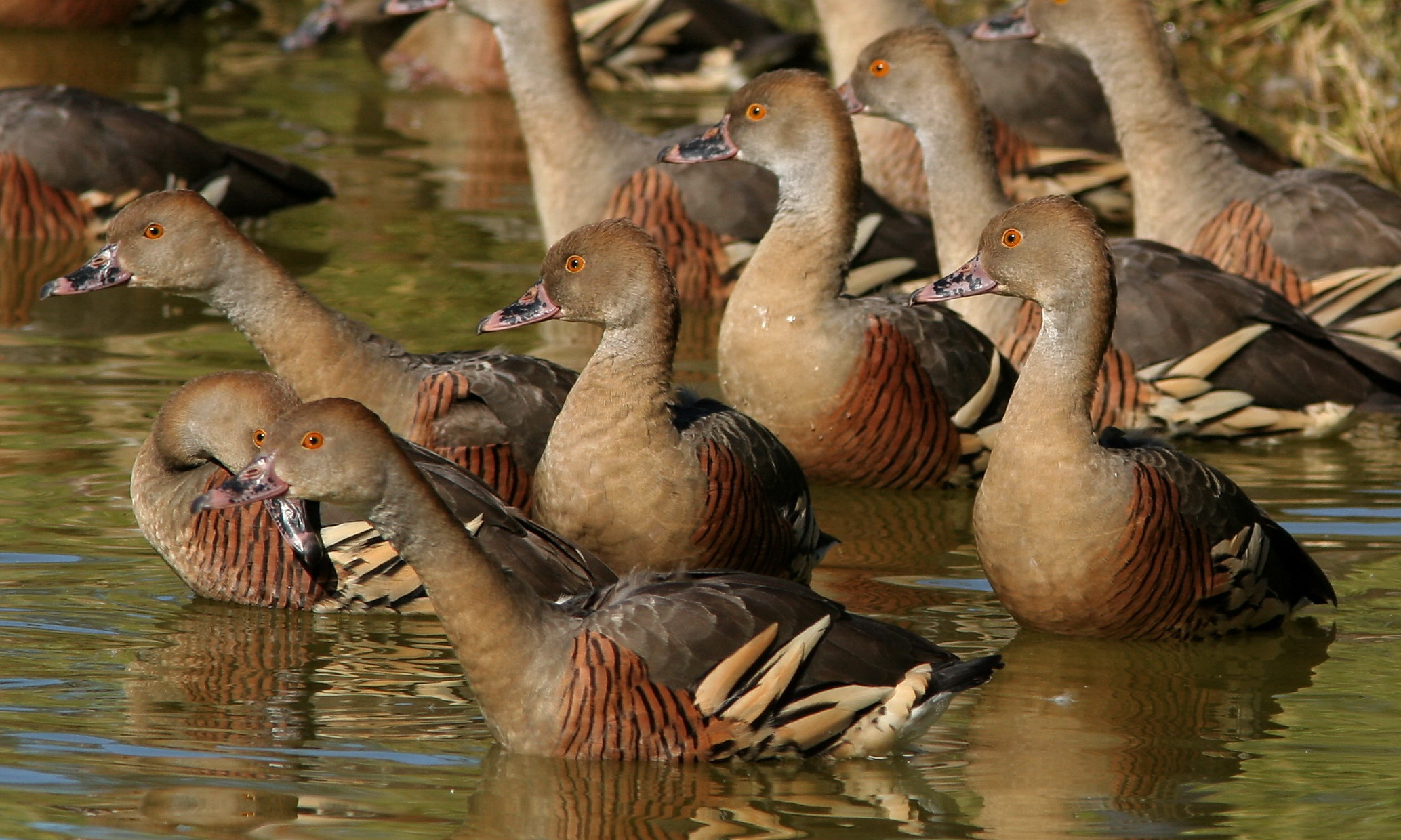
The lake is an important site for plumed whistling-ducks

Lake Woods is an ephemeral freshwater lake in the Northern Territory of Australia. It lies on Newcastle Creek close to the small town of Elliott on the Stuart Highway, about halfway between Darwin and Alice Springs. It is important as a breeding site for waterbirds.

== Description ==
There are two near-permanent waterholes on Newcastle Creek - South Newcastle and Longreach – that merge with Lake Woods during major floods, creating a large expanse of open water. The lake basin supports open lignum shrubland and open woodland of coolibah, gutta-percha and belalie. River red gums occur around the waterholes.

The land in the IBA is covered by two pastoral leases, Newcastle Waters and Powell Creek, both of which are managed by the Consolidated Pastoral Company. About 8% of the land is managed as the Longreach Waterhole Protected Area by the Parks and Wildlife Commission of the Northern Territory in cooperation with the lease managers.

== Birds ==
A 1,240-square-kilometre (480 sq mi) tract of land, corresponding to the area of the lake when fully inundated, has been identified by BirdLife International as an Important Bird Area (IBA) because it has supported up to 116,000 waterbirds when flooded, including over 1% of the world population of plumed whistling-ducks. It also provides habitat for Australian bustards and yellow-tinted honeyeaters. Bird species recorded in substantial numbers include the Australian pelican, Oriental pratincole and little curlew. The IBA is the only known inland breeding site in the Northern Territory for great egrets.
