= Cutta Cutta Caves Nature Park =

Protected area in the Northern Territory, Australia

- IUCN category III (natural monument or feature)
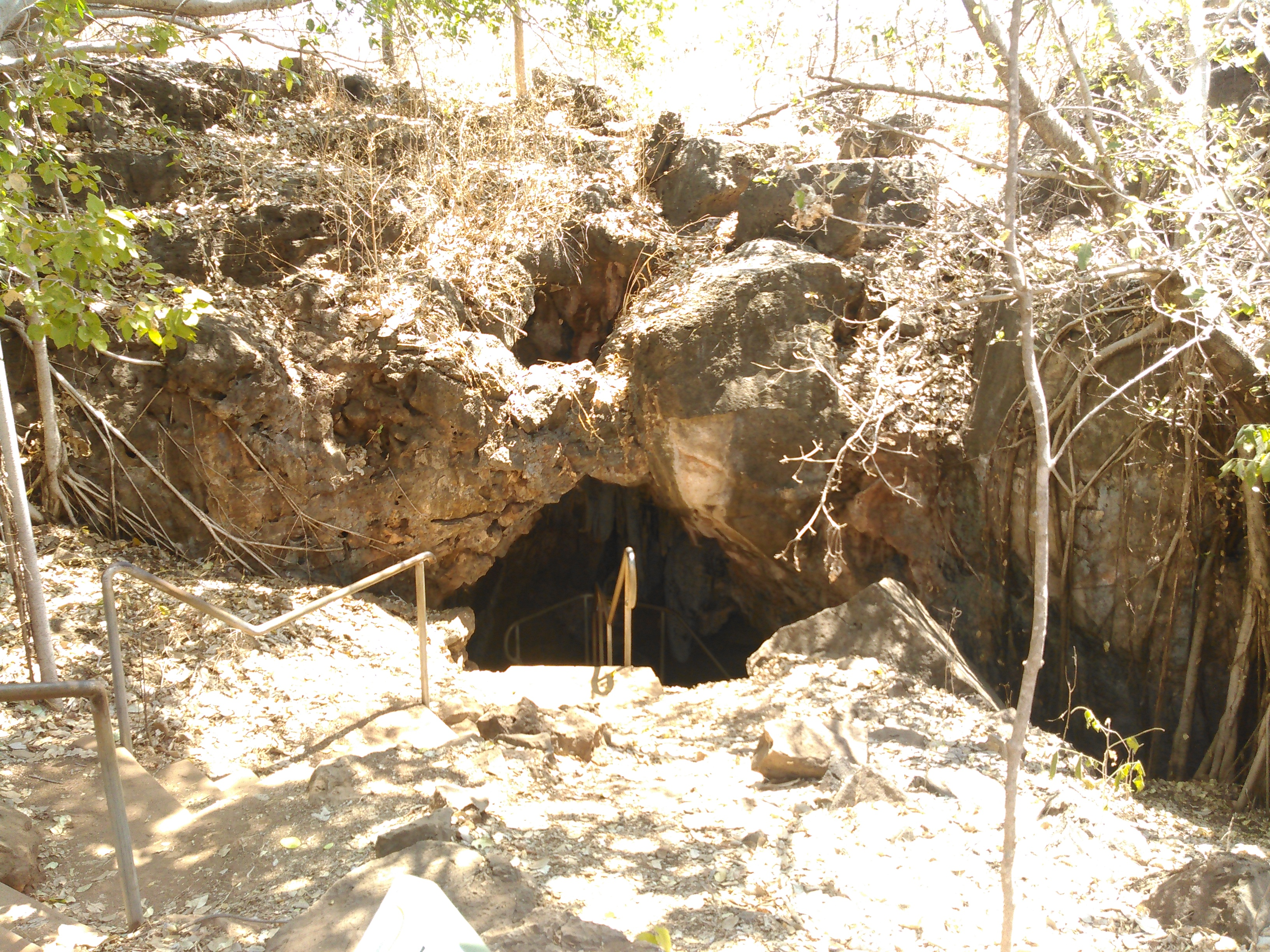
- Cutta Cutta Caverns

- Location within Northern Territory
- Location: Northern Territory
- Nearest city: Katherine
- Coordinates: 14°34′32.9″S 132°28′17″E
- Area: 259 ha (640 acres)
- Established: 20 April 1967
- Visitors: 17200 (in 2022)
- Governing body: Parks and Wildlife Commission of the Northern Territory
- Website: http://www.parksandwildlife.nt.gov.au/parks/find/cuttacuttacaves#.U9wVZz8cTmI

Cutta Cutta Caves Nature Park is a reserve covering 1,499 hectares of limestone Karst landscape near the town of Katherine, in Australia's Northern Territory. The park is easily accessible from the Stuart Highway, about 27 km (17 mi) south of Katherine, and features two show caves where guided tours are offered to the public, making it a popular tourist attraction. The caves are the only tropical examples in Australia which are open to the public.

Cutta Cutta Caves are associated with Barrac Barrac, or Diver Duck dreaming creation stories by the local Jawoyn Indigenous people. Other sources, such as Lonely Planet, claim Cutta Cutta is a Jawoyn word meaning "many stars", as they believe that caves are where the stars rest during the day; however, there does not seem to be a specific name for the formations in the documented or oral history. Evidence of occupation by the Jawoyn people can be found throughout the park with a number of campsites and stone artifacts identified. At least one unnamed cave within the park shows evidence of man-made grooves on an interior wall some distance from the entrance, although it is widely understood that the Jawoyn people did not regularly enter the deep caves.

Following European settlement, the main cave was discovered by a stockman around 1900, and has been known by several names. Initially Smith's Cave, during World War II, servicemen called it 16 Mile Cave. In 1967 the caves were placed under the management of the Northern Territory Reserves Board as the Sixteen Mile Caves Reserve, and guided tours commenced. In 1979, the park changed to its current name and in 1991, a second cave, Tindal Cave, was opened to the public, which has since been closed. Only one cave is open for guided tours. Cutta Cutta Cave extends 750 m (2,460 ft), with 240 m (790 ft) accessible to the public with lighting and walkways. There are a number of other cave systems within the park which are not open to the public.

In addition to a visitor centre and kiosk, the park offers a Tropical Woodland walk, with information for visitors about the local flora and fauna. The caves are subject to flooding during the tropical wet season and may be closed for periods of time. As well as limestone stalactite and stalagmite formations, a number of rare species can be observed in and around the caves including the carnivorous ghost bat and the brown tree snake.
