= Howard Springs Nature Park =

Protected area in the Northern Territory, Australia

Howard Spring Nature Park
- IUCN category V (protected landscape/seascape)
- Location within Northern Territory
- Location: Northern Territory
- Coordinates: 12°27′42″S 131°03′11″E
- Area: 2.86 km^{2} (1.10 sq mi)
- Established: 22 May 1952
- Visitors: 43,300 (in 2017)
- Governing body: Parks and Wildlife Commission of the Northern Territory
- Website: Official website

Howard Springs Nature Park is a 286 hectares (710 acres) protected area located 35 kilometres (22 mi) south of Darwin, Northern Territory. A suitable habitat for waterfowl of the Northern Territory, it also has swimming areas and walking trails. The actual Springs became important in 1910 when they came under consideration as a solution to Darwin's unreliable water supply.

== See also ==
- Protected areas of the Northern Territory
