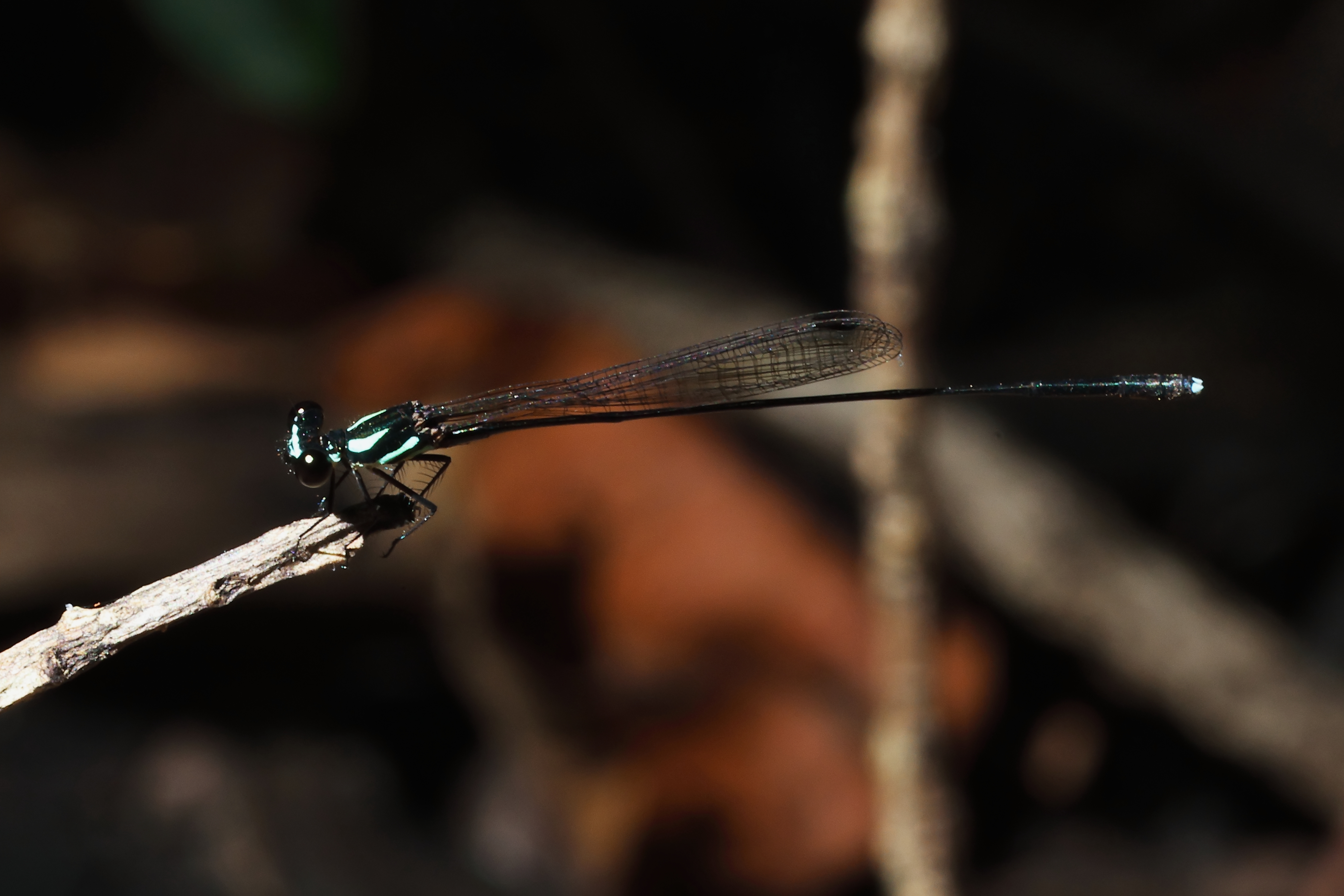
- Male, Northern Territory

Conservation status
- Vulnerable (IUCN 3.1)

Scientific classification
- Kingdom: Animalia
- Phylum: Arthropoda
- Clade: Pancrustacea
- Class: Insecta
- Order: Odonata
- Suborder: Zygoptera
- Family: Platycnemididae
- Genus: Nososticta
- Species: N. koolpinyah

Binomial name
- Nososticta koolpinyah Watson & Theischinger, 1984

= Nososticta koolpinyah =

Species of damselfly

Nososticta koolpinyah is a species of Australian damselfly in the family Platycnemididae, commonly known as a Koolpinyah threadtail. It has only been found in the vicinity of Darwin and on Melville Island in Northern Territory, where it inhabits streams.

Nososticta koolpinyah is a small, slender damselfly; males are coloured black with greenish blue markings and greenish brown tinted wings, females are black with yellowish markings and clear wings.

== Etymology ==
The genus name Nososticta combines the Greek νόσος (nosos, "disease") with στικτός (stiktos, "spotted" or "marked"). The suffix -sticta is commonly used in names of taxa related to Protoneura and the subfamily Isostictinae.

The species name koolpinyah is named for Koolpinyah Station in the Northern Territory, where the original specimens of this species were collected.

== Gallery ==
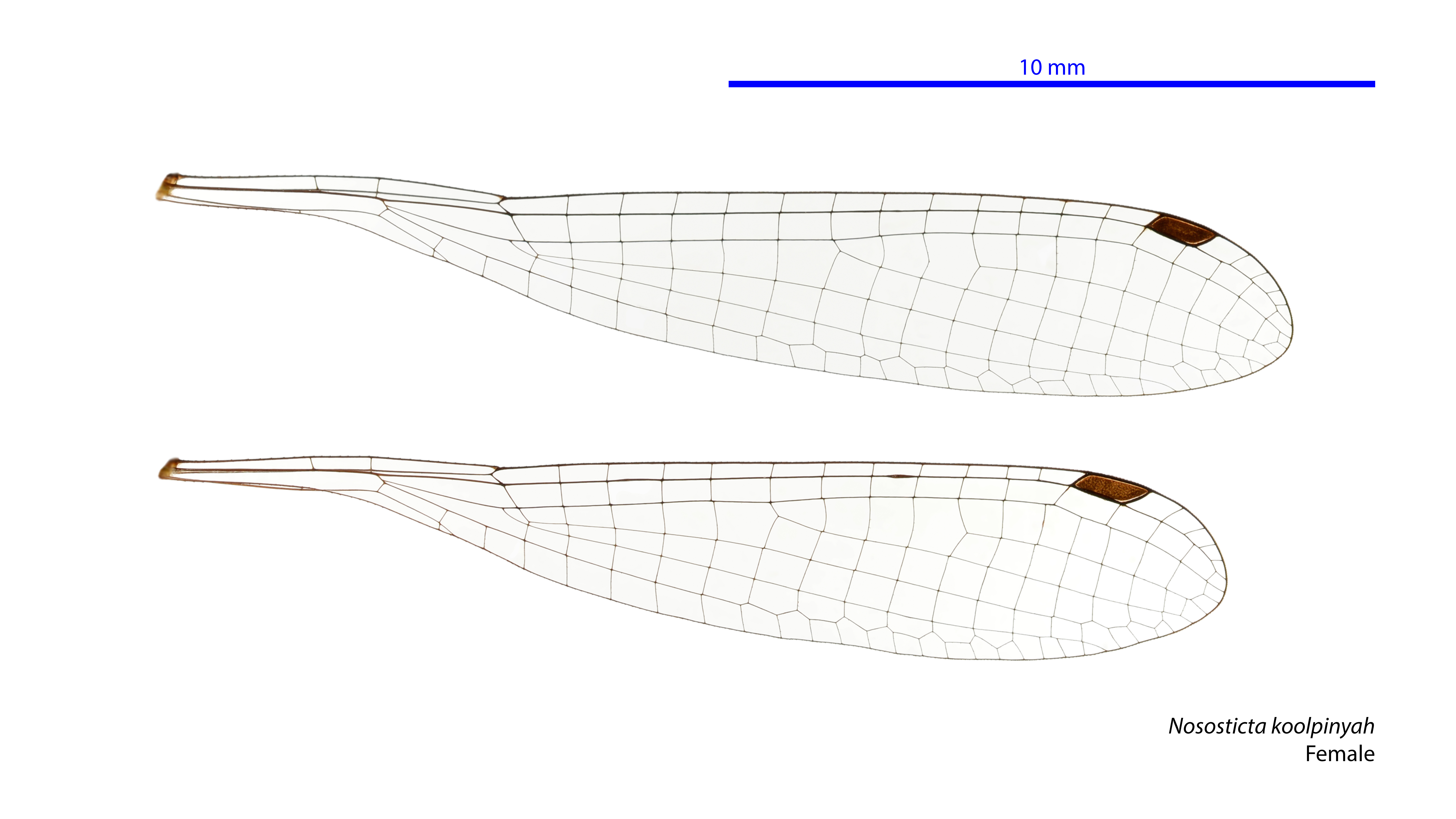
Female wings

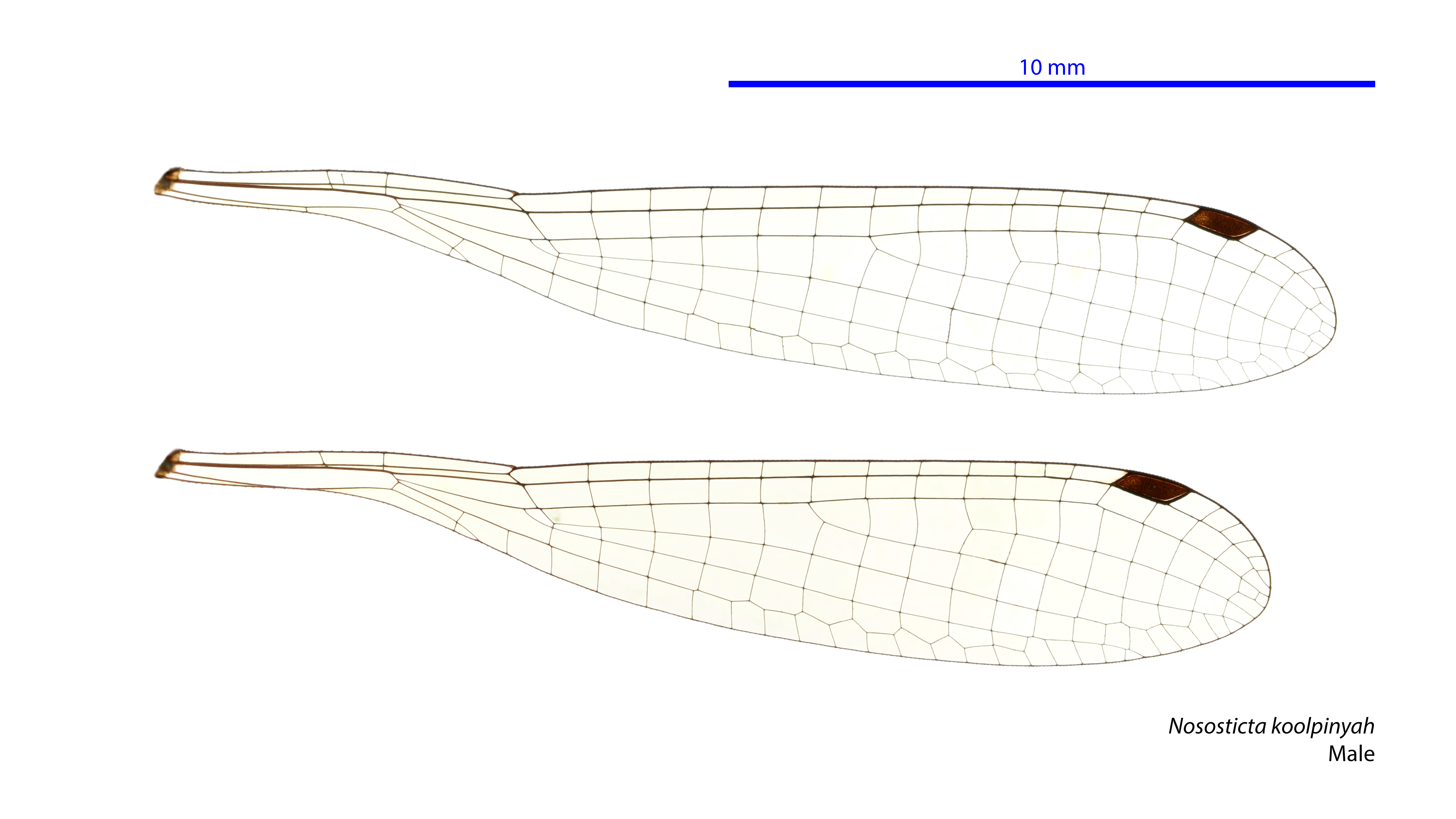
Male wings

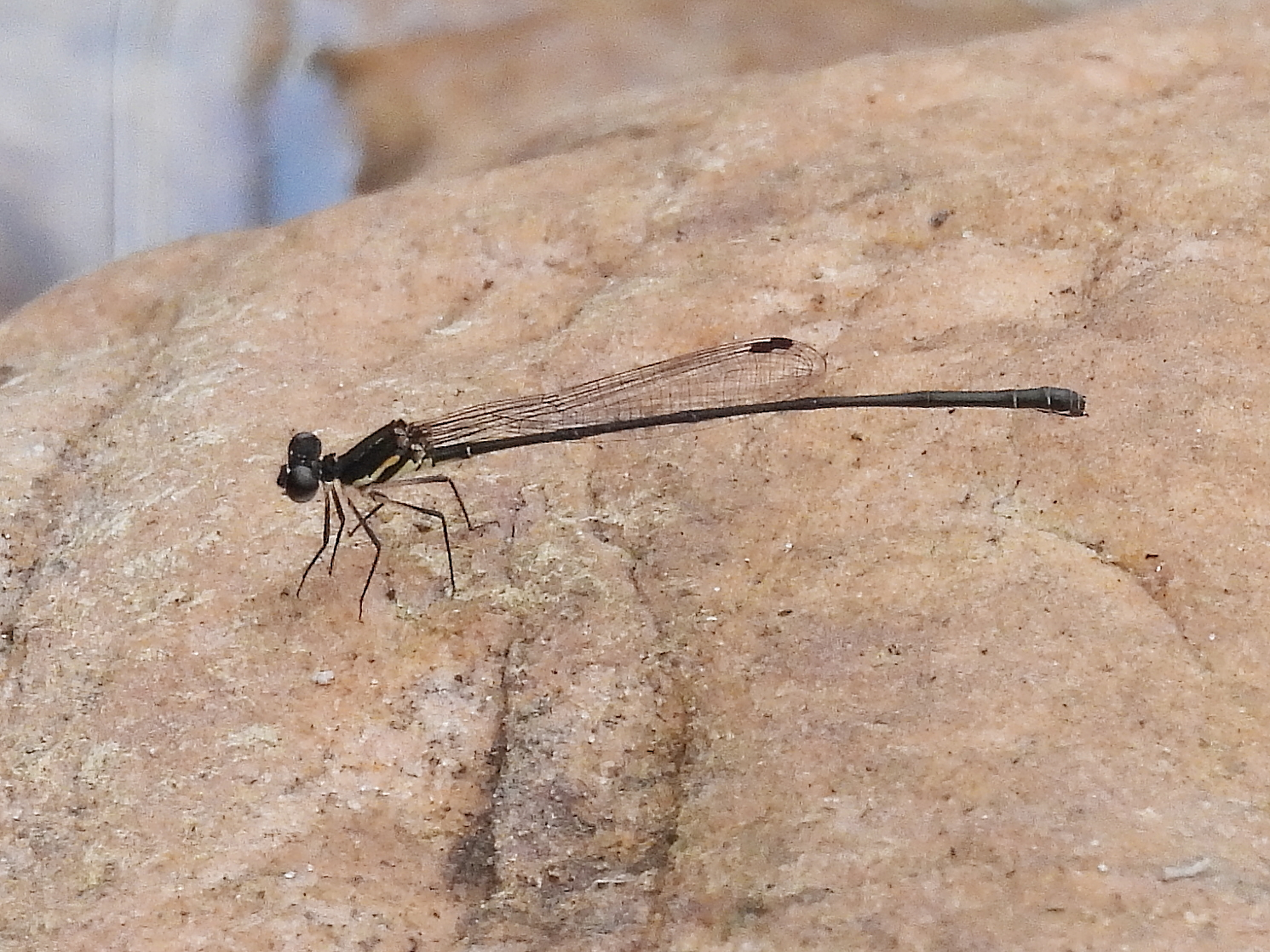
Female

== See also ==
- List of Odonata species of Australia
