= Barranyi (North Island) National Park =

National park in Australia

- IUCN category II (national park)
- Location within Northern Territory
- Location: Northern Territory
- Nearest city: Borroloola
- Coordinates: 15°35′03″S 136°52′05″E
- Area: 53.81 km^{2} (20.78 sq mi)
- Established: 27 March 1992
- Governing body: Parks and Wildlife Commission of the Northern Territory; Aboriginal traditional land owners
- Website: Official website

Barranyi (North Island) National Park is in the Gulf of Carpentaria in the Northern Territory of Australia, 737 km southeast of Darwin.

== See also ==
- Protected areas of the Northern Territory
