= Marri-Jabin Indigenous Protected Area =

Protected area in Northern Territory, Australia

Coordinates: 12°26′S 136°19′E

The Marri-Jabin Indigenous Protected Area (IPA) is a 712 km^{2} (275 sq mi) area around the Moyle and Little Moyle River area in the Northern Territory of Australia.

IPAs are areas of land and sea Country managed by First Nations groups for biodiversity conservation and cultural outcomes through voluntary agreements with the Australian Government. These areas for part of Australia's National Reserve System.

Dedicated in 2010, the Marri-Jabin IPA is managed by about the Thamarrurr Land and Sea Rangers based in Wadeye, administered by Thamarrurr Development Corporation. they undertake weed, fire, cultural, feral animal and other land management activities.

The Marri-Jabin IPA is known for its nationally-recognised species, including the vulnerable red goshawk, the water mouse and the endangered northern quoll. Its wetlands supports up to 500 000 magpie geese, estuarine crocodiles and supports vulnerable flatback and endangered olive ridley turtles nest along its coastline.
