= Attack Creek Historical Reserve =

Protected area in Northern Territory, Australia

Coordinates: 19.0251°S 134.1407°E

Attack Creek Historical Reserve Memorial, 1960

Attack Creek Historical Reserve is a protected area in the Northern Territory of Australia and it is situated 74 kilometres (46 mi) north of Tennant Creek on the Stuart Highway. It is a small reserve, consisting of 0.22 hectares (2,200 m^{2}) which contains the Attack Creek Historical Reserve Memorial, this is also known as the Stuart Memorial.

The reserve was gazetted on 21 May 1979.

== History ==
Attack Creek, where the reserve is situated, was named by John McDouall Stuart after he, and his companions William Kekwick and Benjamin Head, were confronted by Warumungu people at the site on 25 June 1860. Attack Creek is an important waterhole of the Warumungu people.

Following this confrontation, and suffering from scurvy, running low on supplies and struggling to find water, the party had to turn back leading to the failure of Stuart's second expedition.

This reserve also contains the possible grave site of John Milner who was killed there in 1871; this grave was nominated for protection in 2010 but it was not able to be located by ground penetrating radar.
