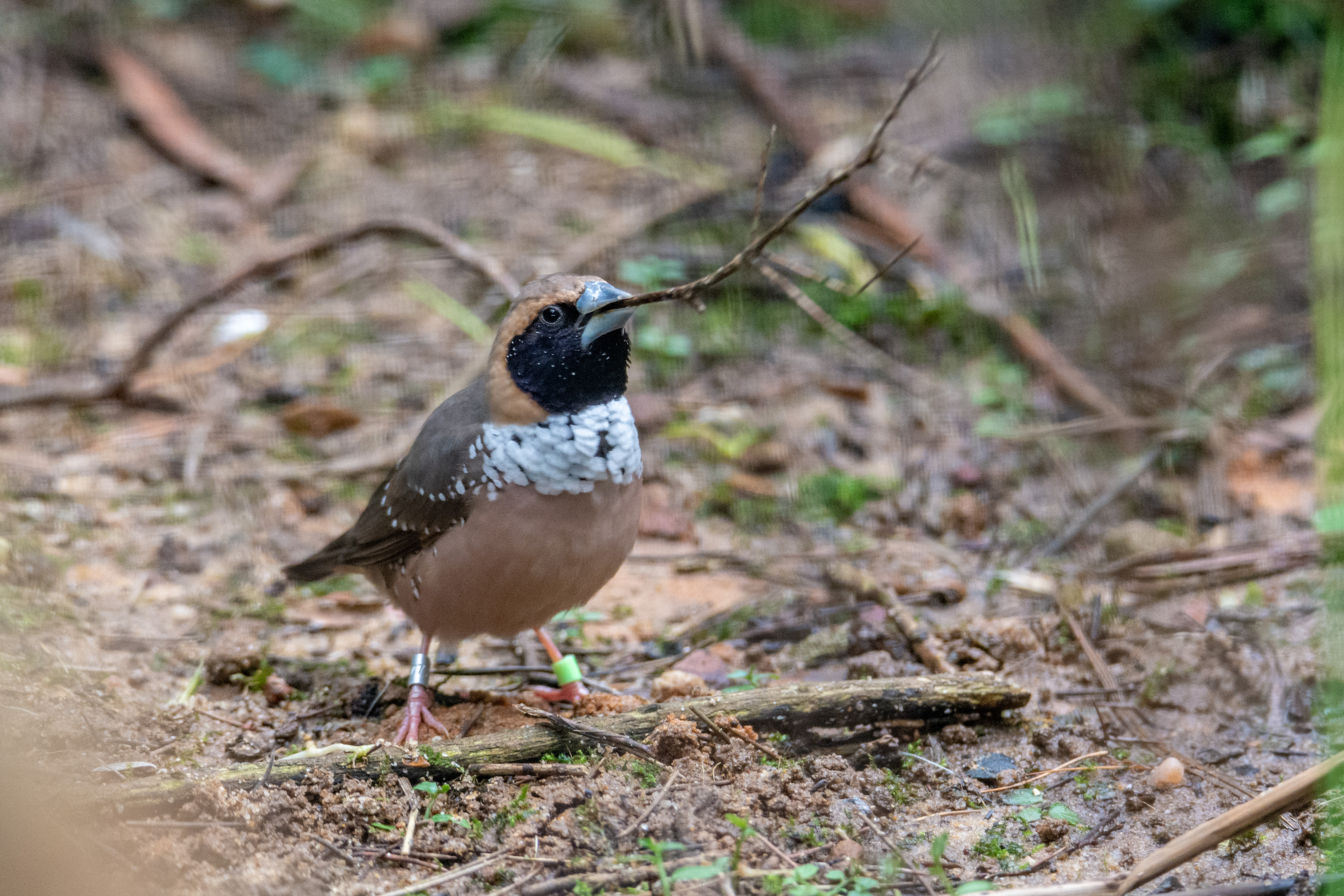

Conservation status
- Least Concern (IUCN 3.1)

Scientific classification
- Kingdom: Animalia
- Phylum: Chordata
- Class: Aves
- Order: Passeriformes
- Family: Estrildidae
- Genus: Heteromunia; Mathews, 1913
- Species: H. pectoralis

Binomial name
- Heteromunia pectoralis (Gould, 1841)

= Pictorella mannikin =

Species of bird

The pictorella mannikin, pictorella munia, or pictorella finch (Heteromunia pectoralis) is small brown and grey finch with a grey bill and distinctive scaly white breast plate which is endemic to northern Australia. It is a seed-eater found in pairs and small flocks in dry savannah and subtropical or tropical dry lowland grassland.

== Taxonomy ==
The pictorella mannikin was formally described in 1841 by English ornithologist John Gould based on a specimen that had been collected in northwestern Australia by John E. Dring who had been a crew member on the third voyage of HMS Beagle. Gould coined the binomial name Amadina pectoralis. When in 1842 Gould described and illustrated the finch in the third volume of his book The Birds of Australia he instead placed the species in the genus Donacola. The pictorella mannikin is now the only species placed in the genus Heteromunia that was introduced by Gregory Mathews in 1913. The genus name combines the Ancient Greek ἑτερος/heteros meaning "different" or "another" with the genus name Munia that had been introduced in 1836 by Brian Houghton Hodgson. The specific epithet pectoralis is Latin meaning "of the breast" or "pectoral". The species is monotypic: no subspecies are recognised.

The common name used in Australia is pictorella mannikin. Gould used the name white-breasted finch in his The Birds of Australia, and it was the common name until 1926 when the Royal Australasian Ornithologists Union (RAOU) Official checklist declared the common name to be "pectorella finch" with no explanation.

The name mannikin is from the Dutch manneken, a diminutive of man. There is no clarity as to why this has been applied to birds in general and particularly to seed eating finches. In 1978 the RAOU checklist committee recommended using "mannikin" for the Australian Lonchura species.

== Description ==
The pictorella mannikin is a grey-billed, buff-brown and grey finch with a distinctive white scaly breast and black face disc. Small white tips on its wing coverts "impart a jewel-like appearance". The bird has a maximum size of 120mm, with a wingspan of 56-63mm, a bill of 12-14mm and weighs between 13 and 15 grams.

== Behaviour and ecology ==
Pictorella mannikins forage on the ground in small flocks or pairs on seeding native grasses and sometimes take small invertebrates. Flocks aggregate around inland water sources particularly at the end of the dry season but disperse away from permanent water when rain falls. In northern Australia they often forage on recently burnt ground, open grassy woodland and fringes of wetland.

They are relatively short tailed with an upright stance. Pictorella mannikin pairs mate for life and lay 4 to 6 white or bluish white eggs in a dome-shaped grass nest in long grass or low bush.

In 2016 the pictorella mannikin's conservation status was listed Least Concern (LC) on the IUCN Red List although the population is marked as decreasing. In 2007, the International Union for Conservation of Nature downgraded its assessment of the species from Near Threatened (NT) to Least Concern (LC) after large flocks of this species were found at several locations. In the Northern Territory and Western Australia the bird's conservation status is listed as Near Threatened (NT) while in Queensland the conservation status listing is Least Concern (LC).

== Gallery ==
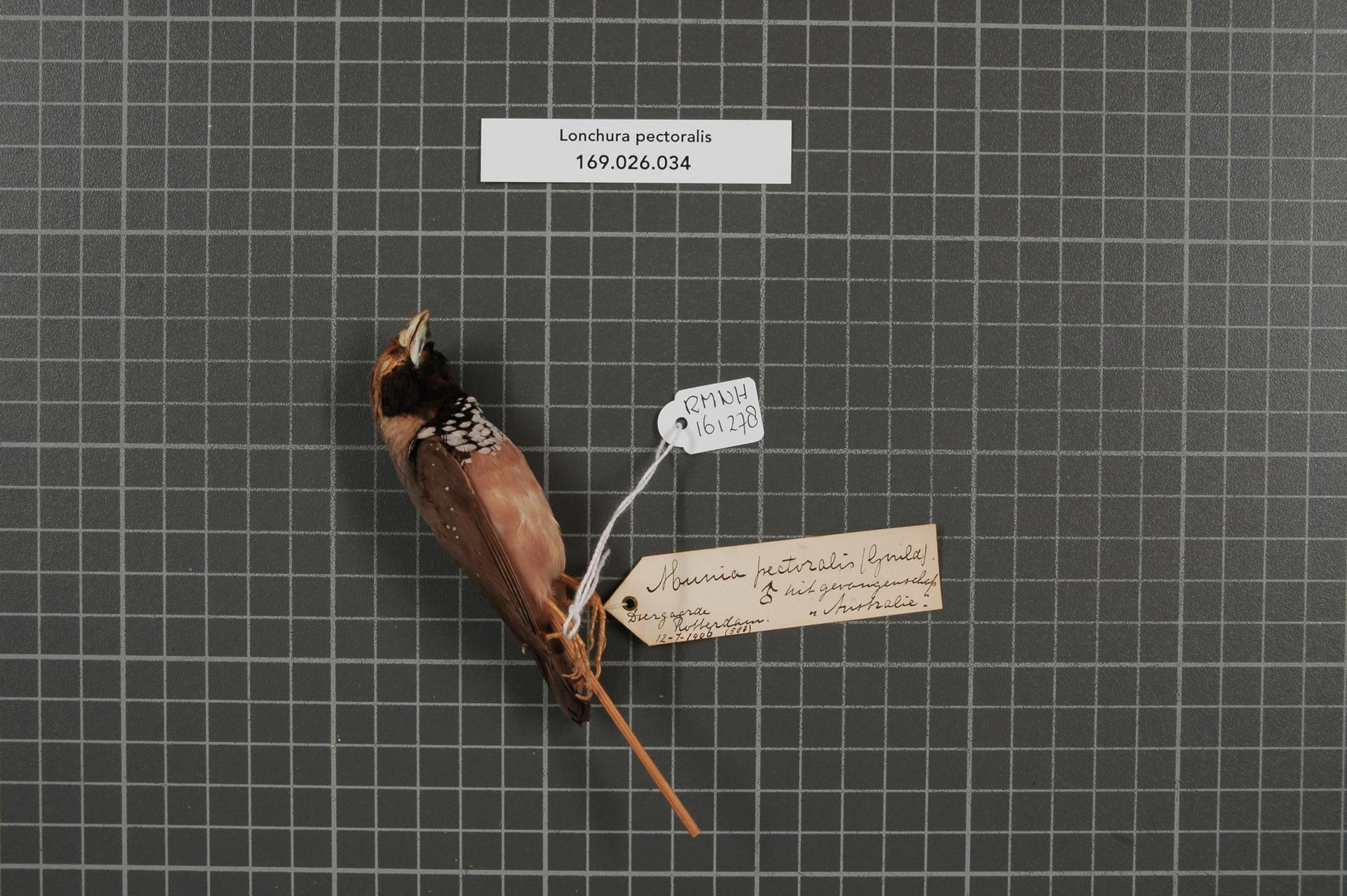
Pictorella mannikin
