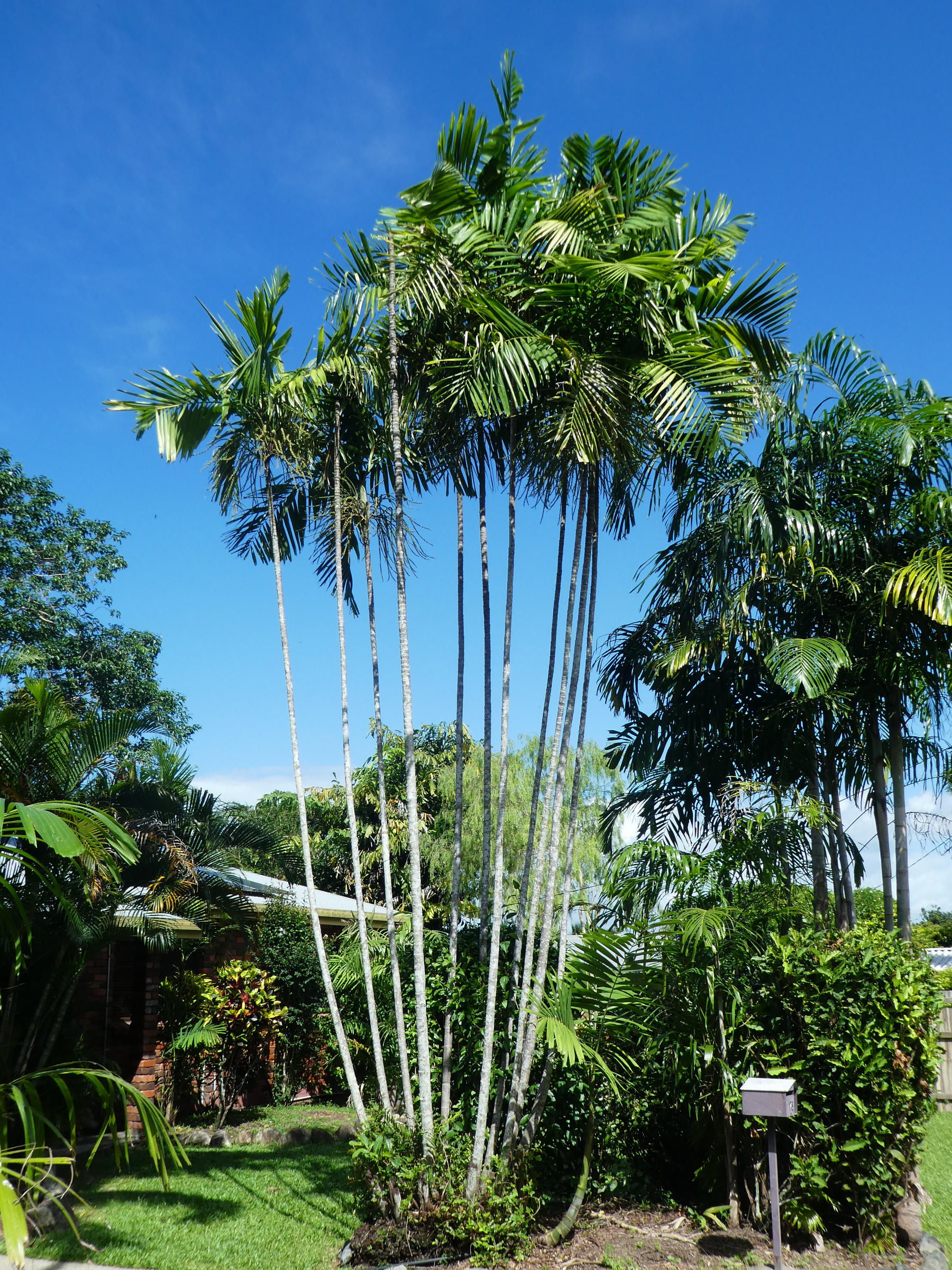

Scientific classification
- Kingdom: Plantae
- Clade: Embryophytes
- Clade: Tracheophytes
- Clade: Spermatophytes
- Clade: Angiosperms
- Clade: Monocots
- Clade: Commelinids
- Order: Arecales
- Family: Arecaceae
- Genus: Ptychosperma
- Species: P. macarthurii

Binomial name
- Ptychosperma macarthurii (H.Wendl. ex H.J.Veitch) H.Wendl. ex Hook.f.

Synonyms
- Actinophloeus bleeseri Burret; Actinophloeus hospitus Burret; Actinophloeus macarthurii (H.Wendl. ex H.J.Veitch) Becc. ex Raderm.; Carpentaria bleeseri (Burret) Burret; Kentia macarthurii H.Wendl. ex H.J.Veitch; Ptychosperma bleeseri Burret; Ptychosperma hospitum (Burret) Burret; Ptychosperma julianettii Becc.; Saguaster macarthurii (H.Wendl. ex H.J.Veitch) Kuntze

= Ptychosperma macarthurii =

Species of palm native to Australia and New Guinea

Ptychosperma macarthurii, commonly known as the Macarthur palm, is a species of tree in the palm family Arecaceae. Its native range is northern Cape York Peninsula in Queensland with a number of disjunct populations in the Northern Territory in Australia and in New Guinea. The species has been widely planted in tropical areas and is commonly grown as an indoor plant.

== Description ==
P. macarthurii is a clumping (multi-stemmed) palm growing to a height of 10 m (33 ft). The slender stems measure up to 10 cm (3.9 in) in diameter and have prominent leaf scars encircling the trunk. They are green in the younger sections of the trunk just below the crownshaft, but may be greyish lower down.

The crown consists of between 3 and 13 paripinnate fronds to 3 m (9.8 ft) in length, with 15-40 pinnae (leaflets) on either side of the rachis (midrib), and have a crownshaft which measures about 70 cm (28 in) long.

The leaflets measure up to 56 cm (22 in) in length, are regularly or irregularly arranged (often clustered), with nearly parallel margins and a truncated tip. They are mid green on the upper surface and lighter below.

The inflorescences are up to 45 cm (18 in) long and branched 2 to 3 times. Flowers are grouped in sets of 3, each with one pistillate (functionally female) set between two staminate (functionally male) flowers. They are yellow-green to light-green with 3 sepals and 3 petals; staminate flowers are 7 mm (0.28 in) long by 4 mm (0.16 in) wide with 23–40 stamens, pistilate flowers measure about 5 mm (0.20 in) and have 3–6 staminodes and a 0.5 mm (0.020 in) recurved stigma.

Fruits of Ptychosperma macarthurii measure up to 18 mm (0.71 in) long and 12 mm (0.47 in) wide, are bright red when ripe and the remains of the stigma is attached at one end. There is a thin layer of flesh around the solitary seed, which is about 12 mm (0.47 in) long with five deep longitudinal grooves.

== Taxonomy ==
Ptychosperma macarthurii was originally described from a specimen collected by Thomas Reedy, a "gardener" on the Chevert Expedition of 1875 whose presence on the expedition was sponsored by Sir William Macarthur, one of the most active and influential horticulturists in Australia in the mid-to-late 19th century. Macarthur forwarded the specimen to the Veitch Nurseries in England, where Harry Veitch described the plant and asked Hermann Wendland to name it in honour of Macarthur. Wendland named it Kentia macarthurii H. Wendl. ex H.J.Veitch, but shortly after, in 1884, Joseph Dalton Hooker published it as Ptychosperma macarthurii (H.Wendl. ex H.J.Veitch) H.Wendl. ex Hook. f.. In a 1909 paper by H.J.Wigman the species was classified as Actinophloeus macarthurii Becc. ex Wigman but without any elaboration on the description. In 1935 that genus was synonymised with Ptychosperma and the former (and current) name was reinstated.

=== Darwin palm ===
The outlying populations of this species to the east and southeast of Darwin were long accepted as the separate species Ptychosperma bleeserii (known as the Darwin palm) as described in 1928 by Max Burret in the journal Repertorium Specierum Novarum Regni Vegetabilis. However, in 2003 Dixon et al. published a treatment that synonymised P. bleeseri with P. macarthurii, a treatment accepted by the Australian botanist John Leslie Dowe, and subsequently published in the online Flora of Australia.

=== Etymology ===
The genus name Ptychosperma is derived from the Ancient Greek word ptukhḗ, meaning "a fold"; and spérma, "seed". The species epithet macarthurii is in honour of Macarthur.

== Distribution and habitat ==
Distribution of this species is mainly clustered in northern Cape York Peninsula, from around Silver Plains (north of Princess Charlotte Bay), north to the top of the peninsula, some Torres Strait Islands and into southern New Guinea.

There is also a small cluster of populations in the Northern Territory, on the western margins of the Adelaide River floodplains and the nearby Howard River, near Darwin.

== Conservation ==
P. macarthurii is classified as endangered in the Northern Territory where its distribution is limited, but in Queensland it is listed as least concern. As of May 2021 it is not listed on the IUCN Red List.
