= Howard River (Northern Territory) =

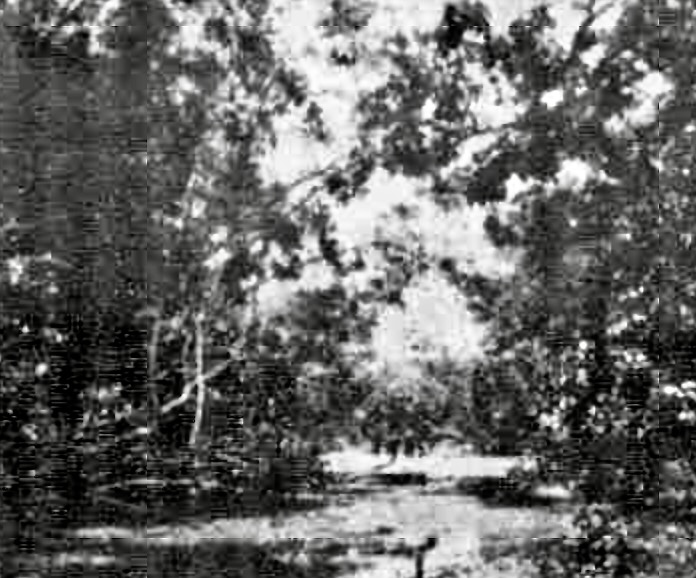
- Howard River in 1924

- Howard River

Location
- Country: Australia
- Territory: Northern Territory
- Townships: Litchfield Municipality

Physical characteristics
- Source
  - elevation: 30 m (98 ft)
- Mouth
  - location: Darwin Harbour
  - coordinates: 12°21′36″S 131°02′15″E
  - elevation: 0 m (0 ft)
- Length: 29.1 km (18.1 mi)
- Basin size: 497 km^{2} (192 sq mi)

Howard River is a river in the outer suburbs of Darwin. In the wet season it starts just south of the Arnhem Highway, at about 30 m (98 ft) and flows 29 km (18 mi) north to Darwin Harbour. In drier times the river just forms pools.

Prior to 1865 the Howard River area was occupied by the Larrakia Nation and Wulna. In 1865 W. P. Auld, of Finniss's exploration party, named the Howard River after Captain Frederick Howard, of HMS Beatrice which charted the area.

The Howard River is one of only two rivers feeding Darwin Harbour which flow all year round. Its catchment is 497 km^{2} (192 sq mi), which runs into the broad coastal plains of Shoal Bay. It runs over Quaternary rocks, with poorly drained saline muds and clay plains. Each wet season these plains are flooded by fresh water to depths of up to 2 m (6 ft 7 in) deep, for 6 to 8 months. The valley has many lifestyle blocks, which, with demands from crops such as mangoes, has depleted the Koolpinyah dolomite aquifer, as over 2,000 wells have been sunk since 1960.

Scattered natural vegetation remains, especially beside the river and its streams. It was open savanna dominated by woolewoorrng, Corymbia jacobsiana and a sorghum grassland understory. There is also monsoon vine forest, mangrove and samphire, with scattered chenopod shrubland.
