= Parks and Wildlife Commission of the Northern Territory =

Coordinates: 12°27′53″S 130°50′35″E

Agency overview
- Formed: 29 November 1995
- Preceding agency: Conservation Commission of the Northern Territory
- Jurisdiction: Northern Territory Government
- Headquarters: 8th Floor, Charles Darwin Centre, 19 The Mall, Darwin, Northern Territory
- Employees: 287 (June 2016)
- Minister responsible: Minister for the Environment, Climate Change and Water Security
- Agency executive: Mark Ashley, Executive Director, Parks and Wildlife
- Parent department: Department of Environment, Parks and Water Security
- Website: https://depws.nt.gov.au/parks-and-wildlife-commission

Parks and Wildlife Commission of the Northern Territory (also known as the Parks and Wildlife Division in some sources) is the Australian Northern Territory Government agency responsible for tasks including the establishment of "parks, reserves, sanctuaries and other land", the management of these, and the "protection, conservation and sustainable use of wildlife." It was created under the Parks and Wildlife Commission Act on 29 November 1995 to replace the former Conservation Commission of the Northern Territory.

On 12 September 2016, the commission was amalgamated by an administrative arrangement order along with the Department of Arts and Museums, Department of Sport and Recreation, Tourism NT, and parts of both the Department of Lands, Planning and Environment and the Department of Land Resource Management to establish the Department of Tourism and Culture.

As of June 2017, it was described as follows:

Parks and Wildlife is responsible for protecting and developing the Territory’s parks and reserves for the benefit of the community, and also administers wildlife management programs. The Parks and Wildlife Division manages 87 parks and reserves covering close to 5.05 million hectares and containing spectacular natural, cultural, geological, historical, tourism and recreational values. Some 33 Territory parks are jointly managed with the traditional owners..

As of June 2017, it was structured into the following units:

1. Northern Australian Parks,
2. Central Australian Parks,
3. Savannah/Gulf Parks,
4. Tourism and Visitor,
5. Engagement,
6. Park Development,
7. Business Services,
8. Wildlife Operations,
9. George Brown Darwin Botanic Gardens,
10. Alice Springs Desert Park,
11. Territory Wildlife Park.

It operates from administrative centres in Darwin, Katherine, Tennant Creek and Alice Springs.

== See also ==
- Protected areas of the Northern Territory
- NSW National Parks & Wildlife Service
- Parks Victoria
- Queensland Parks and Wildlife Service
- Tasmania Parks and Wildlife Service
- National Parks and Wildlife Service South Australia
- Department of Biodiversity, Conservation and Attractions (Western Australia)
