= Arnhem Land tropical savanna =

Ecoregion in Northern Territory, Australia

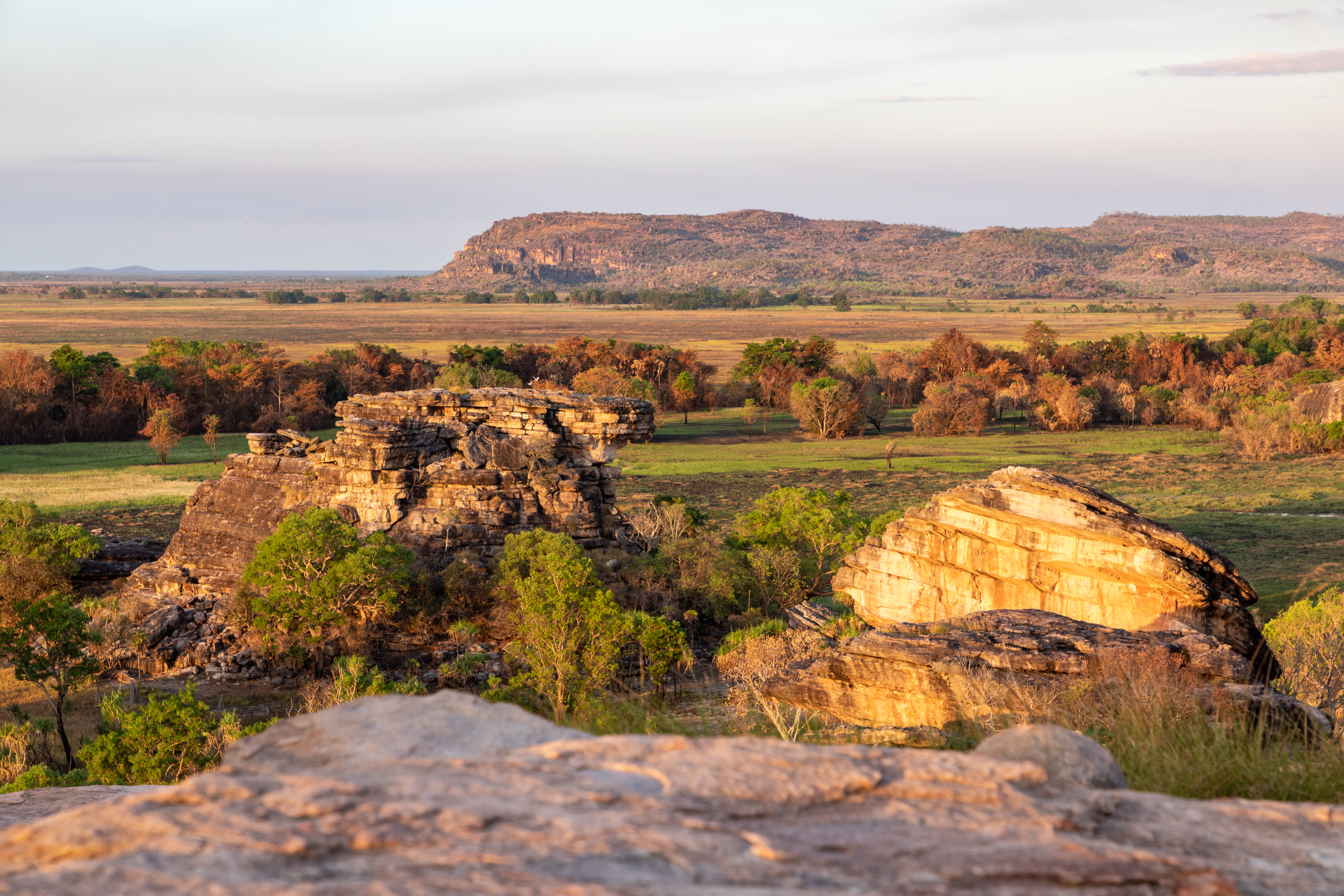
- Nadap Lookout in Kakadu National Park

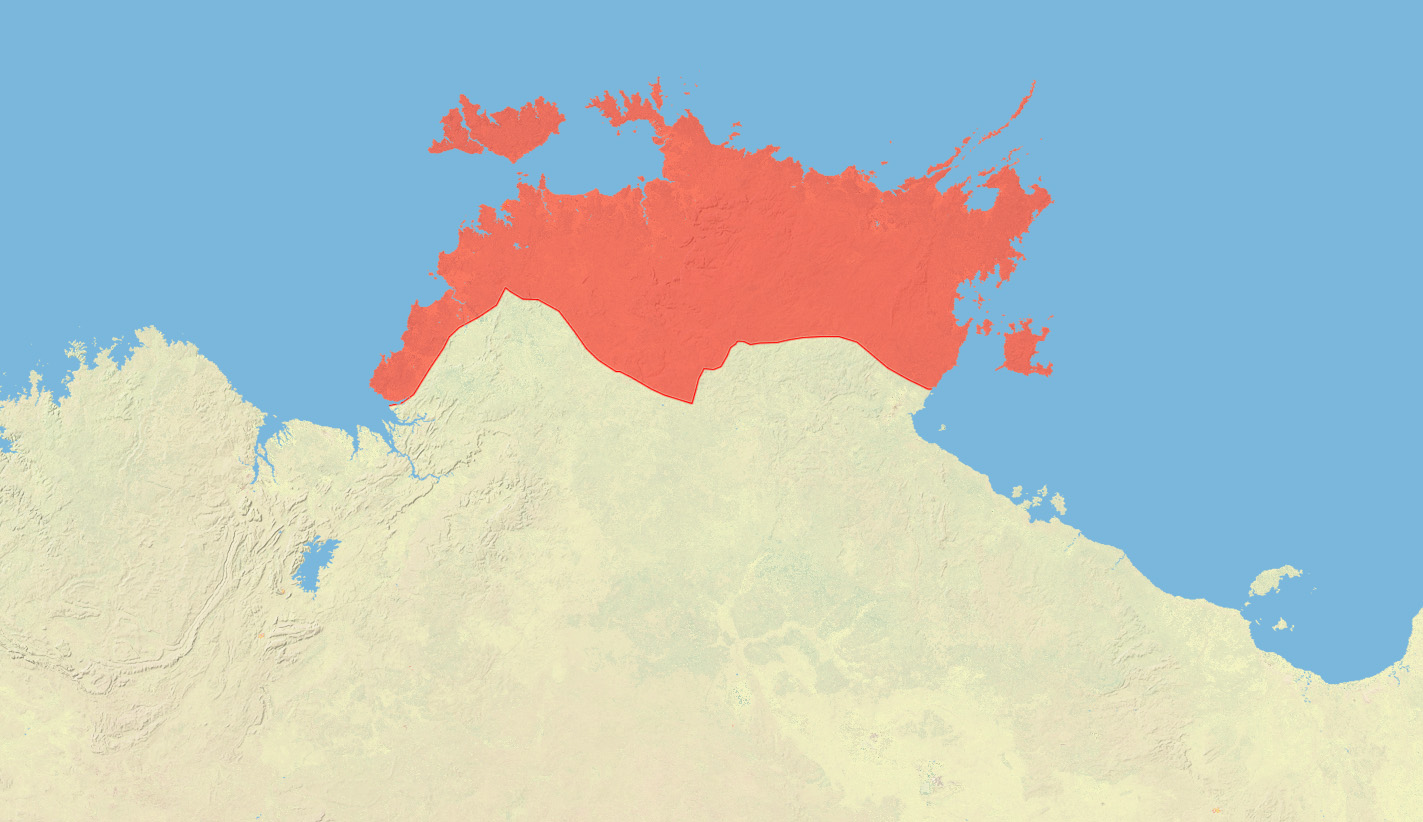
- Map of the Arnhem Land tropical savanna ecoregion

Ecology
- Realm: Australasian
- Biome: tropical and subtropical grasslands, savannas, and shrublands
- Borders: Carpentaria tropical savanna; Kimberley tropical savanna

Geography
- Area: 154,737 km^{2} (59,744 mi^{2})
- Country: Australia
- States: Northern Territory
- Coordinates: 12.56°S 133.37°E

Conservation
- Conservation status: Relatively stable/intact
- Protected: 55,398 km² (36%)

The Arnhem Land tropical savanna is a tropical and subtropical grasslands, savannas, and shrublands ecoregion in Australia's Northern Territory.

== Geography ==
The ecoregion occupies the peninsula of Arnhem Land and its offshore islands, including the Tiwi Islands, Groote Eylandt, and the Wessel Islands.

Western Arnhem land has rugged sandstone plateaus and gorges. The rest of the peninsula has gentler topography, and includes broad river floodplains and coastal lowlands.

Arnhem Land is bounded on the northwest by the Timor Sea, on the north by the Arafura Sea, and on the east by the Gulf of Carpentaria. The Kimberley tropical savanna ecoregion lies to the southwest, and the Carpentaria tropical savanna to the southeast.

=== IBRA regions ===
The ecoregion includes six IBRA regions – Arnhem Coast, Arnhem Plateau, Central Arnhem, Darwin Coastal, Pine Creek, and Tiwi Cobourg.

== Climate ==
The ecoregion has a tropical savanna climate. Rainfall is strongly seasonal, with a summer wet season from November to March, and a mostly rainless dry season during the rest of the year. Average annual rainfall ranges from 1200 mm in the south to 1800 mm in the Tiwi Islands in the northwest. Average monthly maximum temperatures are varied from 27º to 33º C.

== Flora ==
The predominant vegetation is woodland of Darwin stringybark (Eucalyptus tetrodonta) and Darwin woollybutt (Eucalyptus miniata). The trees are evergreen and form an open canopy up to 20 metres high. The open canopy supports an understory of tall grass, mostly species of Sorghum growing up to 2.5 metres high.

Areas of monsoon rainforest are found in enclaves with fertile soils, protection from fire, and dry-season water from shallow aquifers or perennial rivers or streams. The rainforest flora is distinct from the predominant eucalyptus-dominated woodlands. The rainforest flora includes evergreen, semi-evergreen, and deciduous trees, and the species mix varies with conditions. Woody vines are abundant, and climb into the tree canopy. Allosyncarpia ternata is a characteristic tree of the Arnhem Land rainforests. Tall-canopied littoral forests and vine thickets are found near the coast. Further inland, evergreen gallery forests grow along rivers, and evergreen forest patches are found at the base of escarpments.

Heathlands grow in areas of the sandstone plateaus with thin, acidic soils, and are home to many endemic species.

Other plant communities include floodplain sedgelands and grasslands, swamp forests dominated by species of Melaleuca, and mangrove forests.

== Fauna ==
Native mammals include the agile wallaby (Macropus agilis), common wallaroo (Osphranter robustus), antilopine kangaroo (Osphranter antilopinus), northern quoll (Dasyurus hallucatus), short-beaked echidna (Tachyglossus aculeatus), northern brushtail possum (Trichosurus arnhemensis), common brushtail possum (Trichosurus vulpecula), rock-haunting ringtail possum (Petropseudes dahli), sugar glider (Petaurus breviceps), dusky rat (Rattus colletti), and pale field rat (Rattus tunneyi).

Endemic species include the Arnhem shovel-nosed snake (Brachyurophis morrisi), the Kakadu dunnart (Sminthopsis bindi), Arnhem Land rock rat (Zyzomys maini), and the Kakadu pebble-mound mouse (Pseudomys calabyi).

== Protected areas ==
A 2017 assessment found that 55,398 km², or 36%, of the ecoregion is in protected areas. Protected areas in the ecoregion include Kakadu National Park, Djukbinj National Park, Nitmiluk National Park, Garig Gunak Barlu National Park, Mary River National Park, and Litchfield National Park. Indigenous protected areas in the ecoregion include Anindilyakwa, Dhimurru, Djelk, Laynhapuy–Stage 1, Marthakal, Warddeken, and the northern portion of South-East Arnhem Land.
