= List of Indigenous Protected Areas of Western Australia =

Indigenous Protected Areas in Western Australia

Western Australia, as of 2022, has 18 Indigenous Protected Areas. At the time of the last two-yearly Collaborative Australian Protected Areas Database report in 2022, 50,915,811 hectares (125,815,710 acres) of land in Western Australia was covered by Indigenous Protected Areas, which is 66.87 percent of all protected areas in the state and 20.15 percent of the state overall. Overall, just over 30 percent of Western Australia is covered by protected areas.

== Indigenous Protected Areas list ==
| Name | IUCN | Gazetted area (hectare) | Declared | Coordinates | IBRA |
|---|---|---|---|---|---|
| Anangu Tjutaku | VI | 9,750,511 | 22 December 2021 | 28°58′43″S 127°20′48″E | GVD, NUL |
| Balanggarra | VI | 1,090,905 | 7 August 2013 | 14°54′07″S 127°40′27″E | CEK, NOK, VIB |
| Bardi Jawi | IV | 43,045 | 23 May 2013 | 16°28′23″S 122°53′49″E | DAL |
| Bardi Jawi | VI | 83,939 | 23 May 2013 | 16°41′11″S 122°56′45″E | DAL, NOK |
| Birriliburu | III | 557,199 | 23 April 2013 | 24°17′06″S 124°21′00″E | GAS, GID, LSD |
| Birriliburu | VI | 6,110,154 | 23 April 2013 | 24°56′39″S 123°07′46″E | GAS, GID, LSD |
| Dambimangari | VI | 617,211 | 13 June 2013 | 15°39′52″S 125°00′48″E | NOK |
| Karajarri | II | 44,021 | 7 May 2014 | 18°44′27″S 121°40′03″E | DAL |
| Karajarri | VI | 2,436,545 | 7 May 2014 | 19°15′01″S 122°40′24″E | DAL, GSD |
| Kiwirrkurra | VI | 4,267,664 | 1 September 2014 | 22°52′24″S 127°30′03″E | GID, GSD |
| Matuwa and Kurrara-Kurrara | III | 7,954 | 30 June 2015 | 25°57′44″S 121°32′41″E | GAS |
| Matuwa and Kurrara-Kurrara | IV | 1,100 | 30 June 2015 | 26°11′09″S 121°20′23″E | GAS, MUR |
| Matuwa and Kurrara-Kurrara | V | 587,588 | 30 June 2015 | 25°42′23″S 121°42′18″E | GAS, MUR |
| Ngaanyatjarra | VI | 9,973,606 | 10 October 2002 | 25°07′29″S 127°25′37″E | CER, GVD, GID, GSD |
| Ngadju | VI | 4,399,301 | 11 September 2020 | 31°26′54″S 123°03′48″E | COO, MAL, NUL |
| Ngururrpa | VI | 2,962,988 | 3 September 2020 | 21°21′30″S 128°08′01″E | GSD, TAN |
| Ninghan | III | 609 | 14 October 2006 | 29°27′42″S 117°18′22″E | YAL |
| Ninghan | VI | 46,226 | 14 October 2006 | 29°29′33″S 117°21′30″E | AVW, YAL |
| Nyangumarta Warrarn | VI | 2,826,369 | 23 April 2015 | 20°23′13″S 122°05′52″E | DAL, GSD, PIL |
| Paruku | II | 54,403 | 13 September 2002 | 20°12′28″S 127°24′35″E | TAN |
| Paruku | VI | 374,158 | 13 September 2002 | 19°56′15″S 127°34′27″E | GSD, TAN |
| Uunguu | VI | 759,814 | 20 December 2010 | 14°34′41″S 126°08′21″E | NOK |
| Warlu Jilajaa Jumu | VI | 1,616,606 | 9 November 2007 | 20°27′33″S 126°07′44″E | GSD |
| Wilinggin | V | 1,675,896 | 12 June 2013 | 16°04′24″S 125°39′39″E | CEK, DAL, NOK, VIB |
| Wilinggin | VI | 763,015 | 12 June 2013 | 16°16′13″S 127°27′02″E | CEK, NOK |
| Yawuru | IV | 22,478 | 30 January 2017 | 17°57′32″S 122°24′18″E | DAL |
| Yawuru | VI | 105,446 | 30 January 2017 | 17°47′58″S 122°32′13″E | DAL |

=== Key for IBRA ===
Interim Biogeographic Regionalisation for Australia:

- AVW: Avon Wheatbelt
- CAR: Carnarvon xeric shrublands
- CEK: Central Kimberley
- COO: Coolgardie bioregion
- DAL: Dampierland
- ESP: Esperance Plains
- GAS: Gascoyne bioregion
- GES: Geraldton Sandplains
- GID: Gibson Desert
- GSD: Great Sandy Desert
- GVD: Great Victoria Desert
- HAM: Hampton bioregion
- ITI: Indian Tropical Islands
- JAF: Jarrah Forest
- LSD: Little Sandy Desert
- MAL: Mallee bioregion
- MUR: Murchison (Western Australia)
- NOK: Northern Kimberley
- NUL: Nullarbor Plain
- OVP: Ord Victoria Plain
- PIL: Pilbara shrublands
- SWA: Swan Coastal Plain
- TAN: Tanami bioregion
- VIB: Victoria Bonaparte
- WAR: Warren bioregion
- YAL: Yalgoo bioregion

== See also ==
- List of national parks of Western Australia
- List of conservation parks of Western Australia
- List of named nature reserves of Western Australia
- List of unnamed nature reserves of Western Australia
