= List of conservation parks of Western Australia =

Conservation parks in Western Australia

Western Australia, as of 2022, has 72 conservation parks, of which 40 are named and 32 unnamed. At the time of the last two-yearly Collaborative Australian Protected Areas Database report in 2022, 12,621,397 hectares (31,188,150 acres) of land in Western Australia was covered by conservation parks, which is 1.66 percent of all protected areas in the state and 0.5 percent of the state overall. Overall, just over 30 percent of Western Australia is covered by protected areas.

== Conservation parks list ==
Name	IUCN	Gazetted area (hectare)	Declared	Coordinates	IBRA
Barnabinmah Conservation Park	II	59,908	11 May 2021	28°43′07″S 117°17′07″E	MUR, YAL
Blackbutt Conservation Park	II	37	8 December 2004	34°07′27″S 115°57′06″E	WAR
Boyagarring Conservation Park	II	1,209	15 November 1991	32°23′12″S 116°34′43″E	JAF
Brooking Gorge Conservation Park	II	7,967	28 June 1994	17°59′52″S 125°29′39″E	DAL
Burra Conservation Park	II	795	2 February 1900	31°23′57″S 121°11′16″E	COO
Camp Creek Conservation Park	II	1,267	10 July 2000	14°52′35″S 125°49′46″E	NOK
Cane River Conservation Park	II	147,882	12 April 2000	22°07′58″S 115°41′32″E	CAR, PIL
Cape Range Conservation Park	II	9,294	13 October 2021	22°12′00″S 114°00′40″E	CAR
Coalseam Conservation Park	II	754	25 May 1893	28°57′49″S 115°33′09″E	AVW, GES
Dardanup Conservation Park	II	643	8 December 2004	33°26′02″S 115°47′39″E	JAF, SWA
Devonian Reef Conservation Park	II	41,371	28 June 1994	17°44′06″S 125°08′05″E	CEK, DAL
Geikie Gorge Conservation Park	II	5,332	28 June 1994	18°03′43″S 125°41′20″E	DAL
Goldfields Woodlands Conservation Park	II	33,112	14 April 2000	31°16′50″S 120°56′05″E	COO
Gooralong Conservation Park	II	62	7 January 1994	32°20′02″S 116°03′07″E	JAF
Hester Conservation Park	II	2,302	8 December 2004	33°53′40″S 116°10′16″E	JAF
Jinmarnkur Conservation Park	II	268	28 September 2016	19°02′40″S 121°32′00″E	DAL
Kerr Conservation Park	II	307	8 December 2004	33°43′59″S 116°01′42″E	JAF
Korijekup Conservation Park	II	166	5 January 2004	33°05′32″S 115°55′00″E	SWA
Kujungurru Warrarn Conservation Park	II	1,139	28 September 2016	19°52′26″S 120°19′56″E	DAL
Lakeside Conservation Park	II	7,077	18 February 2021	27°37′10″S 117°45′21″E	MUR
Lane Poole Reserve Conservation Park	II	9,959	6 February 1987	32°47′22″S 116°08′41″E	JAF
Laterite Conservation Park	II	12,191	10 July 2000	14°58′24″S 125°55′15″E	NOK
Len Howard Conservation Park	II	67	25 July 1995	32°33′57″S 115°41′40″E	SWA
Leschenault Peninsula Conservation Park	II	581	8 January 1993	33°13′06″S 115°41′29″E	SWA
Leschenaultia Conservation Park	II	341	23 September 1994	31°51′52″S 116°14′08″E	JAF
Lupton Conservation Park	II	9,329	15 March 1963	32°28′05″S 116°39′19″E	JAF
Montebello Islands Conservation Park	II	1,466	7 July 1992	20°28′24″S 115°31′50″E	CAR
Mount Manning Range Conservation Park	II	147,292	14 December 2005	30°17′10″S 119°39′23″E	COO, MUR
Muja Conservation Park	II	6,323	8 December 2004	33°32′57″S 116°27′43″E	JAF
Penguin Island Conservation Park	III	11	18 October 1918	32°18′20″S 115°41′30″E	SWA
R 46235 Conservation Park	II	391,813	10 July 2000	16°56′04″S 125°05′43″E	CEK, NOK
Rapids Conservation Park	II	2,383	30 November 2004	33°55′12″S 115°17′04″E	JAF
Rock Gully Conservation Park	Ia	670	22 June 2017	34°31′58″S 117°02′03″E	JAF
Rowles Lagoon Conservation Park	II	405	17 September 1897	30°26′02″S 120°51′23″E	COO
Shell Beach Conservation Park	III	518	8 January 1993	26°12′21″S 113°45′01″E	CAR
Totadgin Conservation Park	II	257	8 May 1888	31°34′23″S 118°12′55″E	AVW
Unnamed WA01333 Conservation Park	II	38	2 August 1888	33°57′25″S 116°23′55″E	JAF
Unnamed WA17804 Conservation Park	II	202	16 September 1921	31°39′50″S 121°13′49″E	COO
Unnamed WA23088 Conservation Park	II	7	2 June 1950	35°00′33″S 117°50′11″E	JAF
Unnamed WA23920 Conservation Park	II	107	2 April 1954	28°25′14″S 115°19′40″E	GES
Unnamed WA24657 Conservation Park	II	12	15 March 1957	31°58′49″S 116°02′37″E	JAF
Unnamed WA29901 Conservation Park	II	2	8 August 1969	30°13′28″S 115°24′06″E	GES
Unnamed WA33448 Conservation Park	II	35	27 June 1975	32°59′28″S 115°58′48″E	JAF
Unnamed WA34213 Conservation Park	II	324	3 September 1976	32°52′29″S 119°49′12″E	MAL
Unnamed WA38749 Conservation Park	II	69	25 May 1984	32°35′47″S 115°46′56″E	SWA
Unnamed WA39584 Conservation Park	II	113	26 September 1986	32°10′22″S 115°46′46″E	SWA
Unnamed WA39752 Conservation Park	II	160	23 January 1987	32°10′02″S 115°47′10″E	SWA
Unnamed WA41986 Conservation Park	II	2,369	14 January 1992	30°35′34″S 115°26′55″E	GES, SWA
Unnamed WA43290 Conservation Park	II	27	30 May 1995	31°43′49″S 115°46′22″E	SWA
Unnamed WA46756 Conservation Park	II	1	20 February 2002	31°49′03″S 115°49′08″E	SWA
Unnamed WA47100 Conservation Park	II	2,542	21 September 2006	33°15′11″S 119°40′40″E	ESP
Unnamed WA48291 Conservation Park	II	49	4 October 2005	32°10′12″S 115°49′30″E	SWA
Unnamed WA48436 Conservation Park	II	1,302	28 November 2005	33°20′26″S 118°49′28″E	MAL
Unnamed WA48717 Conservation Park	II	454	5 December 2006	30°16′50″S 115°06′53″E	SWA
Unnamed WA49144 Conservation Park	II	5	25 May 2007	25°47′39″S 113°43′11″E	CAR
Unnamed WA49220 Conservation Park	II	131	7 August 2007	32°07′32″S 115°45′47″E	SWA
Unnamed WA49363 Conservation Park	II	74	24 September 2008	32°01′39″S 115°56′11″E	SWA
Unnamed WA49561 Conservation Park	II	1	18 April 2008	32°08′42″S 115°50′30″E	SWA
Unnamed WA49742 Conservation Park	II	670	3 July 2008	33°41′18″S 120°19′37″E	ESP
Unnamed WA49994 Conservation Park	II	2,773	27 November 2008	31°25′13″S 115°34′09″E	SWA
Unnamed WA51272 Conservation Park	VI	41	19 September 2012	30°10′06″S 115°12′57″E	GES
Unnamed WA51376 Conservation Park	III	747	3 April 2014	28°36′47″S 114°40′12″E	GES
Unnamed WA51963 Conservation Park	II	0.16	17 June 2015	32°13′18″S 116°01′19″E	JAF
Unnamed WA52103 Conservation Park	Ia	695	22 January 2016	30°51′52″S 116°43′39″E	AVW
Unnamed WA53269 Conservation Park	VI	262	28 June 2018	33°36′17″S 117°58′12″E	AVW
Unnamed WA53313 Conservation Park	II	610	15 May 2020	32°04′47″S 115°49′43″E	SWA
Unnamed WA53632 Conservation Park	II	25	15 May 2020	32°08′59″S 115°47′10″E	SWA
Unnamed WA53971 Conservation Park	II	100, 107	22 December 2021	28°57′36″S 117°15′57″E	MUR, YAL
Wallaroo Rock Conservation Park	II	1,214	2 July 1965	30°48′05″S 120°29′33″E	COO
Walyarta Conservation Park	II	231,820	28 September 2016	19°51′28″S 121°40′50″E	DAL, GSD
Westralia Conservation Park	II	855	30 November 2004	33°21′37″S 116°07′03″E	JAF
Yarra Yarra Lake Conservation Park	II	10,758	5 October 2005	29°43′15″S 115°48′19″E	AVW

=== Key for IBRA ===
Interim Biogeographic Regionalisation for Australia:

- AVW: Avon Wheatbelt
- CAR: Carnarvon xeric shrublands
- CEK: Central Kimberley
- COO: Coolgardie bioregion
- DAL: Dampierland
- ESP: Esperance Plains
- GAS: Gascoyne bioregion
- GES: Geraldton Sandplains
- GID: Gibson Desert
- GSD: Great Sandy Desert
- GVD: Great Victoria Desert
- HAM: Hampton bioregion
- ITI: Indian Tropical Islands
- JAF: Jarrah Forest
- LSD: Little Sandy Desert
- MAL: Mallee bioregion
- MUR: Murchison (Western Australia)
- NOK: Northern Kimberley
- NUL: Nullarbor Plain
- OVP: Ord Victoria Plain
- PIL: Pilbara shrublands
- SWA: Swan Coastal Plain
- VIB: Victoria Bonaparte
- WAR: Warren bioregion
- YAL: Yalgoo bioregion

== See also ==
- List of national parks of Western Australia
- List of named nature reserves of Western Australia
- List of unnamed nature reserves of Western Australia
- List of Indigenous Protected Areas of Western Australia
