= Northern Tanami Indigenous Protected Area =

Protected area in Northern Territory, Australia

Coordinates: 21°33′S 130°41′E

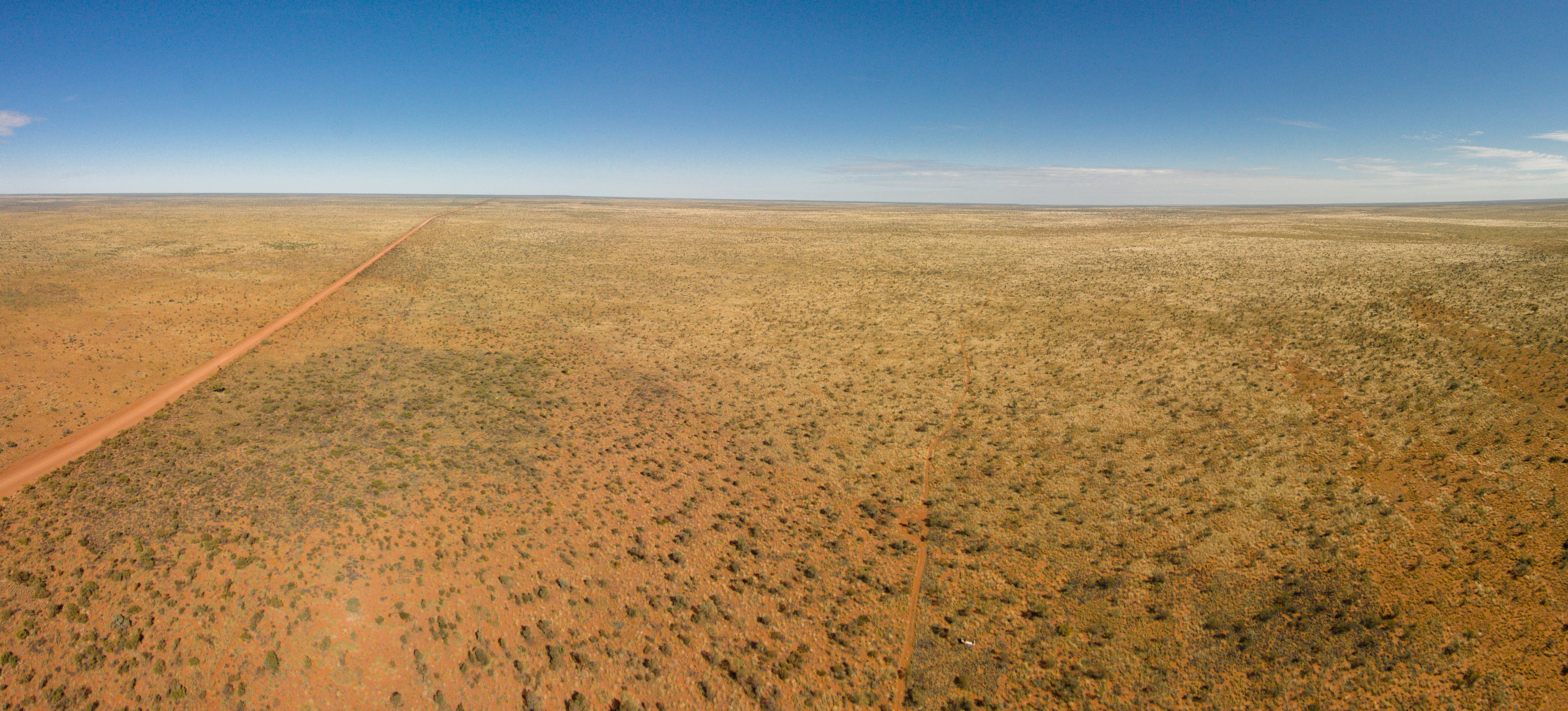
Tanami Desert

The Northern Tanami Indigenous Protected Area (IPA) is 40,050 km^{2} (15,460 sq mi) Walpiri-managed region of the Tanami Desert in Central Australia.

IPAs are areas of land and sea Country managed by First Nations groups for biodiversity conservation and cultural outcomes through voluntary agreements with the Australian Government. These areas form part of Australia's National Reserve System.

Dedicated in 2007, the area has significant cultural and natural value. It is managed by the Warlpiri Rangers, of the Central Land Council's ranger groups combining Yapa (Aboriginal) and Kardiya (non-Aboriginal) knowledges. They are working to control threats from wildfire, weeds and feral animals.

The IPA is subtropical climate with distinct wet and dry seasons. It features high conservation value areas, including vast areas of hummock grassland. It is home to vulnerable species including the walpajirri (greater bilby) and warrarna (great desert skink), and endangered Gouldian finch.

The Groundrush gold mine was located on the Northern Tanami IPA. While it is no longer operational, there are numerous mineral exploration licences covering parts of the IPA, but no current mining activity.
