= List of unnamed nature reserves of Western Australia =

Nature reserves in Western Australia

Western Australia, as of 2022, has 1,233 nature reserves, of which 826 are named and 407 unnamed. At the time of the last two-yearly Collaborative Australian Protected Areas Database report in 2022, 10,074,297 hectares (24,894,130 acres) of land in Western Australia was covered by nature reserves, which is 13.23 percent of all protected areas in the state and 3.99 percent of the state overall. Overall, just over 30 percent of Western Australia is covered by protected areas.

== Nature reserves list ==
Name	IUCN	Gazetted area (hectare)	Declared	Coordinates	IBRA
Unnamed WA00428 Nature Reserve	Ia	36	4 May 1880	29°13′10″S 115°28′22″E	AVW
Unnamed WA00783 Nature Reserve	Ia	257	18 June 1885	29°00′05″S 115°42′44″E	AVW
Unnamed WA01563 Nature Reserve	Ia	99	12 May 1891	31°25′49″S 116°48′00″E	AVW
Unnamed WA01998 Nature Reserve	Ia	38	3 March 1892	34°58′49″S 117°38′30″E	JAF
Unnamed WA02087 Nature Reserve	Ia	63	20 October 1892	33°19′40″S 117°21′47″E	AVW
Unnamed WA02184 Nature Reserve	Ia	40	19 January 1893	33°57′20″S 117°20′26″E	JAF
Unnamed WA02336 Nature Reserve	Ia	11	20 July 1893	31°35′03″S 115°58′31″E	SWA
Unnamed WA02360 Nature Reserve	Ia	633	17 August 1893	29°08′35″S 115°21′18″E	AVW, GES
Unnamed WA03249 Nature Reserve	Ia	3	6 December 1999	33°32′39″S 115°34′30″E	SWA
Unnamed WA04182 Nature Reserve	Ia	159	24 December 1914	33°51′23″S 121°47′05″E	ESP
Unnamed WA05339 Nature Reserve	Ia	40	29 September 1899	33°32′32″S 117°33′04″E	AVW
Unnamed WA05796 Nature Reserve	Ia	41	31 March 1899	33°43′59″S 117°18′00″E	JAF
Unnamed WA06043 Nature Reserve	Ia	930	12 August 1898	32°08′33″S 121°49′49″E	COO
Unnamed WA06268 Nature Reserve	Ia	15	18 November 1898	32°43′25″S 115°56′36″E	SWA
Unnamed WA06547 Nature Reserve	Ia	89	24 February 1899	28°12′58″S 114°35′15″E	GES
Unnamed WA06557 Nature Reserve	Ia	63	24 February 1899	31°14′50″S 116°57′59″E	AVW
Unnamed WA07230 Nature Reserve	Ia	53	17 May 1901	32°39′28″S 116°51′41″E	AVW, JAF
Unnamed WA08029 Nature Reserve	Ia	957	10 January 1902	31°56′29″S 121°37′38″E	COO
Unnamed WA09474 Nature Reserve	Ia	255	25 November 1904	30°54′48″S 118°29′52″E	AVW
Unnamed WA09847 Nature Reserve	Ia	36	23 August 1991	33°19′19″S 117°51′47″E	AVW
Unnamed WA09927 Nature Reserve	Ia	261	27 October 1905	32°35′31″S 119°34′00″E	MAL
Unnamed WA10003 Nature Reserve	Ia	236	22 December 1905	34°40′13″S 117°42′31″E	JAF
Unnamed WA10125 Nature Reserve	Ia	33	11 May 1906	32°31′59″S 117°50′19″E	AVW
Unnamed WA10539 Nature Reserve	Ia	53	28 December 1906	31°08′53″S 117°38′58″E	AVW
Unnamed WA10719 Nature Reserve	Ia	12	5 April 1907	31°44′05″S 117°47′00″E	AVW
Unnamed WA10731 Nature Reserve	Ia	52	14 June 1907	33°37′18″S 116°29′11″E	JAF
Unnamed WA10793 Nature Reserve	Ia	12	21 June 1907	33°53′37″S 116°43′27″E	JAF
Unnamed WA10914 Nature Reserve	Ia	7	13 September 1907	34°02′17″S 117°37′57″E	AVW
Unnamed WA10930 Nature Reserve	Ia	40	9 August 1907	33°12′57″S 117°45′39″E	AVW
Unnamed WA11024 Nature Reserve	Ia	22	13 March 1908	31°48′22″S 117°35′55″E	AVW
Unnamed WA11153 Nature Reserve	Ia	20	27 November 1908	32°04′57″S 117°22′06″E	AVW
Unnamed WA11343 Nature Reserve	Ia	125	3 April 1908	34°34′06″S 117°14′18″E	JAF
Unnamed WA11522 Nature Reserve	Ia	227	17 March 1961	31°15′34″S 118°07′47″E	AVW
Unnamed WA12135 Nature Reserve	Ia	40	21 May 1909	30°40′08″S 117°25′03″E	AVW
Unnamed WA12154 Nature Reserve	Ia	61	7 April 1911	30°53′32″S 117°21′52″E	AVW
Unnamed WA12333 Nature Reserve	Ia	40	3 September 1909	32°00′56″S 117°31′30″E	AVW
Unnamed WA12397 Nature Reserve	Ia	4	8 October 1909	32°16′32″S 117°16′23″E	AVW
Unnamed WA12427 Nature Reserve	Ia	107	19 November 1909	29°44′17″S 116°33′35″E	AVW
Unnamed WA12645 Nature Reserve	Ia	40	27 May 1910	33°27′41″S 117°53′33″E	AVW
Unnamed WA12705 Nature Reserve	Ia	214	3 June 1910	29°35′12″S 115°26′15″E	GES
Unnamed WA12913 Nature Reserve	Ia	70	15 July 1910	31°13′59″S 117°28′39″E	AVW
Unnamed WA12914 Nature Reserve	Ia	7	15 July 1910	31°09′58″S 117°20′25″E	AVW
Unnamed WA13057 Nature Reserve	Ia	140	23 September 1910	31°57′35″S 118°12′11″E	AVW
Unnamed WA13063 Nature Reserve	Ia	42	4 October 1910	33°10′52″S 118°17′15″E	MAL
Unnamed WA13102 Nature Reserve	Ia	16	18 November 1910	33°50′25″S 117°04′34″E	JAF
Unnamed WA13217 Nature Reserve	Ia	24	27 January 1911	32°02′20″S 117°32′11″E	AVW
Unnamed WA13306 Nature Reserve	Ia	17	10 March 1911	30°28′51″S 117°13′48″E	AVW
Unnamed WA13359 Nature Reserve	Ia	3	24 November 1911	32°39′58″S 115°45′51″E	SWA
Unnamed WA13438 Nature Reserve	Ia	176	5 May 1911	33°01′06″S 118°03′20″E	MAL
Unnamed WA13594 Nature Reserve	Ia	41	14 July 1911	31°40′40″S 118°21′24″E	AVW
Unnamed WA13603 Nature Reserve	Ia	26	14 July 1911	32°41′52″S 118°27′06″E	MAL
Unnamed WA14014 Nature Reserve	Ia	53	19 April 1912	32°13′39″S 118°01′41″E	AVW
Unnamed WA14083 Nature Reserve	Ia	12	10 May 1912	31°11′41″S 117°31′14″E	AVW
Unnamed WA14459 Nature Reserve	Ia	440	8 November 1912	33°09′14″S 117°22′08″E	AVW
Unnamed WA14567 Nature Reserve	Ia	0^{[1]}	8 August 1913	33°43′15″S 115°26′20″E	SWA
Unnamed WA14569 Nature Reserve	Ia	38	24 December 1912	31°22′08″S 117°18′24″E	AVW
Unnamed WA14694 Nature Reserve	Ia	41	21 November 1913	32°35′01″S 117°38′05″E	AVW
Unnamed WA14776 Nature Reserve	Ia	40	6 June 1913	28°51′47″S 115°40′21″E	AVW
Unnamed WA14906 Nature Reserve	Ia	385	15 August 1913	30°31′22″S 116°59′39″E	AVW
Unnamed WA14907 Nature Reserve	Ia	175	15 August 1913	30°30′23″S 116°57′58″E	AVW
Unnamed WA15057 Nature Reserve	Ia	91	13 February 1914	32°21′12″S 118°07′52″E	MAL
Unnamed WA15061 Nature Reserve	Ia	16	14 November 1913	33°44′05″S 117°07′37″E	JAF
Unnamed WA15185 Nature Reserve	Ia	10	9 January 1914	34°17′21″S 115°10′06″E	WAR
Unnamed WA15199 Nature Reserve	Ia	2	5 June 1914	31°45′33″S 118°20′34″E	AVW
Unnamed WA15214 Nature Reserve	Ia	101	23 January 1914	34°13′01″S 117°05′21″E	JAF
Unnamed WA15312 Nature Reserve	Ia	2	3 April 1914	30°20′50″S 116°44′05″E	AVW
Unnamed WA15564 Nature Reserve	Ia	17	17 July 1914	30°59′35″S 117°50′55″E	AVW
Unnamed WA15775 Nature Reserve	Ia	61	27 November 1914	34°45′30″S 117°43′52″E	JAF
Unnamed WA15787 Nature Reserve	Ia	2	8 January 1915	32°56′26″S 117°37′24″E	AVW
Unnamed WA15788 Nature Reserve	Ia	2	8 January 1915	32°56′45″S 117°37′38″E	AVW
Unnamed WA15835 Nature Reserve	Ia	21	29 January 1915	29°55′36″S 116°32′08″E	AVW
Unnamed WA15855 Nature Reserve	Ia	40	22 January 1915	33°07′21″S 117°20′52″E	AVW
Unnamed WA15925 Nature Reserve	Ia	88	30 April 2009	32°47′34″S 117°08′04″E	AVW
Unnamed WA16000 Nature Reserve	Ia	1,713	11 June 1915	31°22′16″S 118°48′07″E	AVW
Unnamed WA16068 Nature Reserve	Ia	52	20 July 1915	32°43′20″S 118°05′47″E	MAL
Unnamed WA16196 Nature Reserve	Ia	884	11 August 1922	32°21′07″S 117°50′06″E	AVW
Unnamed WA16245 Nature Reserve	Ia	270	17 December 1915	30°48′24″S 117°29′40″E	AVW
Unnamed WA16262 Nature Reserve	Ia	84	14 January 1916	34°26′05″S 117°30′43″E	JAF
Unnamed WA16281 Nature Reserve	Ia	32	21 January 1916	32°40′46″S 118°00′05″E	AVW
Unnamed WA16293 Nature Reserve	Ia	22	4 February 1916	31°32′17″S 118°03′15″E	AVW
Unnamed WA16319 Nature Reserve	Ia	5	24 March 1916	30°50′27″S 116°40′20″E	AVW
Unnamed WA16479 Nature Reserve	Ia	73	13 October 1916	32°43′49″S 117°52′29″E	AVW
Unnamed WA16560 Nature Reserve	Ia	46	1 December 1916	32°37′04″S 117°56′36″E	AVW
Unnamed WA16584 Nature Reserve	Ia	143	16 February 1917	32°12′45″S 116°57′26″E	AVW
Unnamed WA16787 Nature Reserve	Ia	114	2 February 1917	33°50′07″S 116°43′58″E	JAF
Unnamed WA16901 Nature Reserve	Ia	27	15 March 1918	33°52′42″S 117°54′51″E	AVW
Unnamed WA16932 Nature Reserve	Ia	542	10 May 1918	31°12′35″S 118°10′17″E	AVW
Unnamed WA16942 Nature Reserve	Ia	14	17 May 1918	32°52′28″S 117°53′59″E	AVW
Unnamed WA17233 Nature Reserve	Ia	24	1 November 2019	28°14′13″S 114°51′35″E	GES
Unnamed WA17710 Nature Reserve	Ia	107	13 June 1975	31°09′52″S 117°04′52″E	AVW
Unnamed WA17771 Nature Reserve	Ia	105	29 July 1921	30°47′27″S 117°40′18″E	AVW
Unnamed WA17778 Nature Reserve	Ia	23	12 August 1921	30°41′04″S 116°53′47″E	AVW
Unnamed WA17798 Nature Reserve	Ia	65	26 August 1921	31°10′19″S 118°17′03″E	AVW
Unnamed WA18199 Nature Reserve	Ia	174	19 January 1923	31°21′25″S 118°33′54″E	AVW
Unnamed WA18311 Nature Reserve	Ia	30	15 June 1923	32°36′24″S 118°12′32″E	MAL
Unnamed WA18583 Nature Reserve	Ia	1,059	4 April 1924	31°21′51″S 118°43′19″E	AVW
Unnamed WA18584 Nature Reserve	Ia	577	4 April 1924	31°20′35″S 118°46′38″E	AVW
Unnamed WA18698 Nature Reserve	Ia	150	22 August 1924	32°40′28″S 118°20′42″E	MAL
Unnamed WA18950 Nature Reserve	Ia	4	24 July 1925	30°47′20″S 117°40′04″E	AVW
Unnamed WA19036 Nature Reserve	Ia	9	5 May 1989	30°47′42″S 117°40′32″E	AVW
Unnamed WA19068 Nature Reserve	Ia	44	24 February 1989	33°51′05″S 117°47′16″E	AVW
Unnamed WA19075 Nature Reserve	Ia	136	26 September 1969	33°28′09″S 117°51′34″E	AVW
Unnamed WA19080 Nature Reserve	Ia	80	1 January 1901	33°23′29″S 118°17′07″E	MAL
Unnamed WA19081 Nature Reserve	Ia	134	15 March 1991	33°24′13″S 118°16′13″E	MAL
Unnamed WA19085 Nature Reserve	Ia	275	26 April 1929	33°06′22″S 117°40′42″E	AVW
Unnamed WA19086 Nature Reserve	Ia	18	26 April 1929	33°07′01″S 117°40′53″E	AVW
Unnamed WA19119 Nature Reserve	Ia	40	13 November 1936	32°50′10″S 117°27′12″E	AVW
Unnamed WA19161 Nature Reserve	Ia	12	5 March 1926	34°23′52″S 116°04′16″E	WAR
Unnamed WA19209 Nature Reserve	Ia	115	23 April 1926	31°00′01″S 118°41′56″E	AVW
Unnamed WA19412 Nature Reserve	Ia	55	14 January 1927	32°53′20″S 117°52′49″E	AVW
Unnamed WA19741 Nature Reserve	Ia	45	9 March 1928	32°23′45″S 116°45′31″E	AVW, JAF
Unnamed WA19832 Nature Reserve	Ia	100	20 July 1928	32°22′17″S 118°18′25″E	MAL
Unnamed WA19904 Nature Reserve	Ia	93	21 September 1928	31°29′20″S 116°24′16″E	JAF
Unnamed WA20046 Nature Reserve	Ia	391	1 March 1929	33°20′44″S 118°18′28″E	MAL
Unnamed WA20063 Nature Reserve	Ia	124	22 March 1929	32°36′06″S 116°53′39″E	AVW
Unnamed WA20341 Nature Reserve	Ia	539	7 February 1930	32°35′16″S 119°12′42″E	MAL
Unnamed WA20342 Nature Reserve	Ia	955	7 February 1930	32°38′34″S 119°10′53″E	MAL
Unnamed WA20349 Nature Reserve	Ia	1,770	7 February 1930	33°20′58″S 119°19′47″E	MAL
Unnamed WA20350 Nature Reserve	Ia	1,949	7 February 1930	33°18′23″S 119°14′23″E	MAL
Unnamed WA20479 Nature Reserve	Ia	65	27 June 1930	33°11′10″S 117°20′37″E	AVW
Unnamed WA20635 Nature Reserve	Ia	54	20 February 1931	32°37′32″S 117°21′32″E	AVW
Unnamed WA20877 Nature Reserve	Ia	11	1 July 1932	32°57′52″S 117°03′25″E	AVW
Unnamed WA20878 Nature Reserve	Ia	25	1 July 1932	32°58′03″S 117°02′52″E	AVW
Unnamed WA20985 Nature Reserve	Ia	64	23 December 1932	33°00′48″S 117°11′02″E	AVW
Unnamed WA21064 Nature Reserve	Ia	111	14 July 1933	33°15′19″S 117°10′32″E	AVW
Unnamed WA21175 Nature Reserve	Ia	122	9 February 1934	30°01′22″S 116°19′15″E	AVW
Unnamed WA21196 Nature Reserve	Ia	2	16 March 1934	31°41′35″S 117°58′07″E	AVW
Unnamed WA21424 Nature Reserve	Ia	154	21 October 1938	32°15′49″S 117°31′50″E	AVW
Unnamed WA21475 Nature Reserve	Ia	26	13 December 1935	31°07′54″S 117°09′49″E	AVW
Unnamed WA21543 Nature Reserve	Ia	11	19 June 1936	34°24′27″S 117°13′21″E	JAF
Unnamed WA21705 Nature Reserve	Ia	155	28 May 1937	32°30′27″S 118°50′59″E	MAL
Unnamed WA21745 Nature Reserve	Ia	48	10 September 1937	32°46′24″S 117°59′23″E	AVW
Unnamed WA21980 Nature Reserve	Ia	2	6 April 1939	31°57′00″S 119°00′57″E	AVW
Unnamed WA22116 Nature Reserve	Ia	10	16 February 1940	31°43′07″S 118°17′04″E	AVW
Unnamed WA22247 Nature Reserve	Ia	19	2 May 1941	32°56′38″S 118°04′45″E	MAL
Unnamed WA22363 Nature Reserve	Ia	55	30 October 1942	30°45′36″S 117°05′20″E	AVW
Unnamed WA22966 Nature Reserve	Ia	39	5 August 1949	33°29′28″S 118°33′38″E	MAL
Unnamed WA23008 Nature Reserve	Ia	65	25 November 1949	30°55′31″S 117°19′08″E	AVW
Unnamed WA23029 Nature Reserve	Ia	162	20 January 1950	30°26′48″S 117°33′31″E	AVW
Unnamed WA23076 Nature Reserve	Ia	22	5 May 1950	31°58′52″S 116°02′27″E	JAF
Unnamed WA23179 Nature Reserve	Ia	8	5 January 1951	30°43′58″S 116°01′41″E	AVW
Unnamed WA23218 Nature Reserve	Ia	125	9 March 1951	33°32′05″S 118°28′58″E	MAL
Unnamed WA23313 Nature Reserve	Ia	116	5 October 1951	30°44′57″S 116°38′56″E	AVW
Unnamed WA23366 Nature Reserve	Ia	937	21 December 1951	32°32′37″S 118°29′31″E	MAL
Unnamed WA23665 Nature Reserve	Ia	112	21 December 1952	30°45′35″S 117°02′43″E	AVW
Unnamed WA23850 Nature Reserve	Ia	363	11 December 1953	34°45′38″S 118°07′30″E	JAF
Unnamed WA23923 Nature Reserve	Ia	40	2 April 1954	34°53′02″S 117°52′56″E	JAF
Unnamed WA23991 Nature Reserve	Ia	723	16 July 1954	30°38′51″S 118°28′37″E	AVW
Unnamed WA24057 Nature Reserve	Ia	192	22 October 1954	34°09′23″S 116°54′45″E	JAF
Unnamed WA24060 Nature Reserve	Ia	36	22 October 1954	30°45′12″S 117°10′24″E	AVW
Unnamed WA24185 Nature Reserve	Ia	30	10 June 1955	28°40′08″S 115°15′41″E	GES
Unnamed WA24282 Nature Reserve	Ia	309	23 September 1955	33°31′26″S 117°44′46″E	AVW
Unnamed WA24511 Nature Reserve	Ia	174	3 August 1956	33°50′11″S 121°48′51″E	ESP
Unnamed WA24534 Nature Reserve	Ia	307	31 August 1956	30°28′43″S 117°53′24″E	AVW
Unnamed WA24707 Nature Reserve	Ia	11	24 May 1957	33°49′33″S 117°20′30″E	JAF
Unnamed WA24770 Nature Reserve	Ia	105	9 July 1957	33°49′06″S 118°22′01″E	MAL
Unnamed WA24827 Nature Reserve	Ia	49	11 October 1957	33°30′22″S 118°08′58″E	MAL
Unnamed WA24953 Nature Reserve	Ia	43	28 March 1958	33°48′38″S 121°46′52″E	ESP
Unnamed WA25212 Nature Reserve	Ia	44	19 December 1958	33°44′26″S 118°28′07″E	MAL
Unnamed WA25248 Nature Reserve	Ia	29	20 February 1959	32°44′31″S 118°39′45″E	MAL
Unnamed WA25495 Nature Reserve	Ia	142	18 December 1959	29°37′49″S 115°13′23″E	GES
Unnamed WA25545 Nature Reserve	Ia	1	12 February 1960	34°41′00″S 117°55′47″E	JAF
Unnamed WA25591 Nature Reserve	Ia	40	25 March 1960	30°58′35″S 115°46′40″E	SWA
Unnamed WA25696 Nature Reserve	Ia	7	8 July 1960	33°37′35″S 118°17′17″E	MAL
Unnamed WA25697 Nature Reserve	Ia	16	8 July 1960	33°38′50″S 118°18′45″E	MAL
Unnamed WA25705 Nature Reserve	Ia	263	15 July 1960	34°41′27″S 118°00′10″E	JAF
Unnamed WA25708 Nature Reserve	Ia	239	29 July 1960	32°37′52″S 117°38′33″E	AVW
Unnamed WA25801 Nature Reserve	Ia	741	2 December 1960	31°10′48″S 119°19′06″E	COO
Unnamed WA25836 Nature Reserve	Ia	1	10 February 1961	33°39′37″S 115°19′20″E	SWA
Unnamed WA25872 Nature Reserve	Ia	414	3 March 1961	31°33′29″S 118°04′05″E	AVW
Unnamed WA25984 Nature Reserve	Ia	47	14 July 1961	30°50′24″S 117°00′49″E	AVW
Unnamed WA26001 Nature Reserve	Ia	82	28 July 1961	29°48′39″S 115°16′14″E	GES
Unnamed WA26005 Nature Reserve	Ia	81	28 July 1961	33°05′03″S 117°46′42″E	AVW
Unnamed WA26065 Nature Reserve	Ia	55	8 September 1961	33°42′38″S 115°03′24″E	JAF
Unnamed WA26125 Nature Reserve	Ia	64	10 November 1961	30°04′12″S 115°15′07″E	GES
Unnamed WA26158 Nature Reserve	Ia	5	12 January 1962	33°49′35″S 117°07′45″E	JAF
Unnamed WA26238 Nature Reserve	Ia	188	9 March 1962	33°35′14″S 115°52′12″E	JAF
Unnamed WA26363 Nature Reserve	Ia	56	15 June 1962	32°33′40″S 116°51′32″E	AVW, JAF
Unnamed WA26403 Nature Reserve	Ia	113	27 July 1962	30°58′44″S 118°33′47″E	AVW
Unnamed WA26569 Nature Reserve	Ia	128	14 December 1962	33°48′59″S 118°27′45″E	MAL
Unnamed WA26575 Nature Reserve	Ia	222	14 December 1962	30°09′11″S 116°05′32″E	GES
Unnamed WA26620 Nature Reserve	Ia	3	25 January 1962	33°39′38″S 115°19′12″E	SWA
Unnamed WA26661 Nature Reserve	Ia	347	15 March 1963	32°25′39″S 119°07′11″E	MAL
Unnamed WA26662 Nature Reserve	Ia	106	15 March 1963	33°49′01″S 120°10′34″E	ESP
Unnamed WA26792 Nature Reserve	Ia	1,039	17 May 1963	33°58′54″S 118°38′34″E	MAL
Unnamed WA26809 Nature Reserve	Ia	116	31 May 1963	31°31′26″S 117°43′18″E	AVW
Unnamed WA26885 Nature Reserve	Ia	5,200	19 July 1963	33°48′41″S 121°25′12″E	ESP
Unnamed WA26897 Nature Reserve	Ia	16	19 July 1963	31°59′31″S 117°01′27″E	AVW
Unnamed WA27087 Nature Reserve	Ia	38	20 December 1963	33°50′49″S 122°44′17″E	ESP
Unnamed WA27146 Nature Reserve	Ia	116	6 March 1964	31°06′42″S 118°44′51″E	AVW
Unnamed WA27177 Nature Reserve	Ia	27	8 May 1964	33°38′35″S 120°19′46″E	ESP
Unnamed WA27223 Nature Reserve	Ia	7	19 June 1964	32°27′56″S 117°22′26″E	AVW
Unnamed WA27481 Nature Reserve	Ia	107	7 May 1965	33°37′34″S 117°45′50″E	AVW
Unnamed WA27485 Nature Reserve	Ia	480	17 December 1965	32°38′31″S 118°45′31″E	MAL
Unnamed WA27486 Nature Reserve	Ia	777	17 December 1965	32°37′41″S 118°49′21″E	MAL
Unnamed WA27584 Nature Reserve	Ia	75	25 June 1965	31°24′59″S 118°24′37″E	AVW
Unnamed WA27888 Nature Reserve	Ia	4,615	3 December 1965	33°46′32″S 121°20′47″E	ESP
Unnamed WA27913 Nature Reserve	Ia	34	18 February 1966	30°29′03″S 118°06′58″E	AVW
Unnamed WA27993 Nature Reserve	Ia	21	25 February 1966	30°46′21″S 115°31′56″E	GES
Unnamed WA28047 Nature Reserve	Ia	2,533	1 April 1966	32°26′45″S 119°24′42″E	MAL
Unnamed WA28173 Nature Reserve	Ia	331	8 July 1966	33°17′16″S 118°36′43″E	MAL
Unnamed WA28319 Nature Reserve	Ia	40	14 October 1966	32°02′02″S 117°27′03″E	AVW
Unnamed WA28323 Nature Reserve	Ia	1,180	28 October 1966	31°46′53″S 119°07′24″E	AVW
Unnamed WA28403 Nature Reserve	Ia	74	20 January 1967	31°22′33″S 118°13′44″E	AVW
Unnamed WA28547 Nature Reserve	Ia	506	12 May 1967	32°44′52″S 118°31′08″E	MAL
Unnamed WA28549 Nature Reserve	Ia	63	12 May 1967	33°48′54″S 118°23′20″E	MAL
Unnamed WA28562 Nature Reserve	Ia	161	9 June 1967	31°23′29″S 118°45′13″E	AVW
Unnamed WA28669 Nature Reserve	Ia	158	7 July 1967	30°02′07″S 116°11′19″E	AVW, GES
Unnamed WA28710 Nature Reserve	Ia	0^{[2]}	1 September 1967	30°39′49″S 116°00′49″E	AVW
Unnamed WA28715 Nature Reserve	Ia	434	1 September 1967	32°16′28″S 118°53′28″E	MAL
Unnamed WA28755 Nature Reserve	Ia	14	6 October 1967	29°34′34″S 116°37′06″E	AVW
Unnamed WA28940 Nature Reserve	Ia	4,377	22 March 1968	31°34′20″S 118°46′30″E	AVW
Unnamed WA29027 Nature Reserve	Ia	1,252	15 March 1968	32°33′05″S 119°17′25″E	MAL
Unnamed WA29078 Nature Reserve	Ia	42	28 February 2019	28°20′31″S 115°13′25″E	GES
Unnamed WA29451 Nature Reserve	Ia	213	15 November 1968	32°41′50″S 119°33′11″E	MAL
Unnamed WA29574 Nature Reserve	Ia	858	10 January 1969	32°46′45″S 119°14′45″E	MAL
Unnamed WA29576 Nature Reserve	Ia	512	10 January 1969	32°48′14″S 119°17′38″E	MAL
Unnamed WA29580 Nature Reserve	Ia	65	10 January 1969	32°41′37″S 119°05′31″E	MAL
Unnamed WA29589 Nature Reserve	Ia	40	17 January 1969	32°50′06″S 117°21′40″E	AVW
Unnamed WA29719 Nature Reserve	Ia	117	28 March 1969	30°15′56″S 115°33′28″E	GES
Unnamed WA29777 Nature Reserve	Ia	4	16 May 1969	34°58′36″S 116°44′38″E	WAR
Unnamed WA29906 Nature Reserve	Ia	8	22 August 1969	32°55′56″S 117°23′05″E	AVW
Unnamed WA30270 Nature Reserve	Ia	6	27 February 1970	30°37′09″S 117°21′52″E	AVW
Unnamed WA30299 Nature Reserve	Ia	171	26 March 1970	31°51′05″S 117°31′28″E	AVW
Unnamed WA30324 Nature Reserve	Ia	890	8 May 1970	32°16′08″S 118°04′18″E	AVW
Unnamed WA30394 Nature Reserve	Ia	75	5 June 1970	33°10′13″S 116°59′38″E	JAF
Unnamed WA30427 Nature Reserve	Ia	33	24 July 1970	31°57′45″S 117°14′11″E	AVW
Unnamed WA30429 Nature Reserve	Ia	121	24 July 1970	31°38′21″S 118°26′22″E	AVW
Unnamed WA30430 Nature Reserve	Ia	120	24 July 1970	31°11′24″S 118°47′07″E	AVW
Unnamed WA30431 Nature Reserve	Ia	601	24 July 1970	31°45′47″S 118°03′45″E	AVW
Unnamed WA30516 Nature Reserve	Ia	106	27 November 1970	31°37′46″S 118°30′10″E	AVW
Unnamed WA30791 Nature Reserve	Ia	3	26 February 1971	34°55′02″S 117°59′04″E	JAF
Unnamed WA31043 Nature Reserve	Ia	6	15 October 1971	33°10′42″S 118°15′53″E	MAL
Unnamed WA31091 Nature Reserve	Ia	40	26 November 1971	32°02′28″S 118°38′39″E	AVW
Unnamed WA31094 Nature Reserve	Ia	162	26 November 1971	33°09′30″S 119°57′28″E	MAL
Unnamed WA31111 Nature Reserve	Ia	2,946	10 December 1971	32°59′00″S 118°40′37″E	MAL
Unnamed WA31195 Nature Reserve	Ia	24	21 January 1972	30°43′53″S 118°17′07″E	AVW
Unnamed WA31313 Nature Reserve	Ia	19	19 May 1972	33°28′18″S 121°44′17″E	ESP, MAL
Unnamed WA31424 Nature Reserve	Ia	2,936	7 July 1972	33°29′42″S 119°43′02″E	ESP, MAL
Unnamed WA31468 Nature Reserve	Ia	99	4 August 1972	34°58′22″S 116°58′09″E	WAR
Unnamed WA31489 Nature Reserve	Ia	36	4 August 1972	28°01′12″S 114°40′24″E	GES
Unnamed WA31621 Nature Reserve	Ia	4	15 September 1972	34°37′13″S 116°17′42″E	WAR
Unnamed WA31745 Nature Reserve	Ia	87	2 February 1973	33°29′20″S 121°05′49″E	MAL
Unnamed WA31906 Nature Reserve	Ia	5	30 March 1973	31°55′46″S 115°48′21″E	SWA
Unnamed WA31916 Nature Reserve	Ia	645	30 March 1973	29°50′38″S 115°45′49″E	GES
Unnamed WA32131 Nature Reserve	Ia	1,058	29 June 1973	33°29′25″S 122°48′05″E	MAL
Unnamed WA32259 Nature Reserve	Ia	7	5 October 1973	33°49′14″S 121°53′12″E	ESP
Unnamed WA32419 Nature Reserve	Ia	792	8 February 1974	33°46′28″S 121°31′16″E	ESP
Unnamed WA32663 Nature Reserve	Ia	322	28 June 1974	33°19′55″S 118°15′40″E	MAL
Unnamed WA32864 Nature Reserve	Ia	1,437	20 September 1974	30°28′11″S 118°37′51″E	COO
Unnamed WA32865 Nature Reserve	Ia	579	20 September 1974	30°30′04″S 118°34′00″E	COO
Unnamed WA32993 Nature Reserve	Ia	44	6 December 1974	30°43′48″S 118°30′36″E	AVW
Unnamed WA33113 Nature Reserve	Ia	8,860	31 January 1975	32°55′19″S 121°51′45″E	MAL
Unnamed WA33287 Nature Reserve	Ia	597	16 May 1975	30°19′00″S 115°07′50″E	SWA
Unnamed WA33501 Nature Reserve	Ia	203	11 July 1975	32°49′02″S 121°48′01″E	MAL
Unnamed WA33799 Nature Reserve	Ia	1	23 January 1976	28°47′07″S 114°35′47″E	GES
Unnamed WA33854 Nature Reserve	Ia	20	6 February 1976	30°30′10″S 117°09′58″E	AVW
Unnamed WA34197 Nature Reserve	Ia	637	20 August 1976	31°29′42″S 118°53′18″E	AVW
Unnamed WA34295 Nature Reserve	Ia	929	1 October 1976	32°22′23″S 119°03′32″E	MAL
Unnamed WA35163 Nature Reserve	Ia	6	10 March 1978	33°16′22″S 116°54′31″E	JAF
Unnamed WA35283 Nature Reserve	Ia	271	2 June 1978	32°31′42″S 115°47′51″E	SWA
Unnamed WA35594 Nature Reserve	Ia	55	6 October 1978	30°10′19″S 115°08′10″E	GES
Unnamed WA35598 Nature Reserve	Ia	86	24 November 1978	31°56′14″S 117°45′12″E	AVW
Unnamed WA35659 Nature Reserve	Ia	1,009	20 October 1978	33°14′35″S 121°05′25″E	MAL
Unnamed WA36003 Nature Reserve	Ia	1,113	30 March 1979	32°13′55″S 119°00′13″E	MAL
Unnamed WA36096 Nature Reserve	Ia	486	6 July 1979	32°24′25″S 116°39′43″E	JAF
Unnamed WA36183 Nature Reserve	Ia	358	20 July 1979	33°31′15″S 121°27′16″E	ESP
Unnamed WA36827 Nature Reserve	Ia	19	12 September 1980	34°10′42″S 116°59′59″E	JAF
Unnamed WA36913 Nature Reserve	Ia	484	24 October 1980	20°26′50″S 117°04′38″E	PIL
Unnamed WA36915 Nature Reserve	Ia	9,640	24 October 1980	20°28′59″S 116°51′04″E	PIL
Unnamed WA36918 Nature Reserve	Ia	13,750	10 October 1980	30°48′43″S 119°21′15″E	COO
Unnamed WA36967 Nature Reserve	Ia	146	21 November 1980	33°44′57″S 118°36′00″E	MAL
Unnamed WA37289 Nature Reserve	Ia	768	14 August 1981	32°02′40″S 119°03′54″E	AVW
Unnamed WA37997 Nature Reserve	Ia	19	5 November 1982	31°58′43″S 115°59′22″E	SWA
Unnamed WA38296 Nature Reserve	Ia	144	27 May 1983	31°36′27″S 118°30′26″E	AVW
Unnamed WA38334 Nature Reserve	Ia	408	10 June 1983	33°22′20″S 122°49′25″E	MAL
Unnamed WA38379 Nature Reserve	Ia	186	15 July 1983	33°03′20″S 118°11′10″E	MAL
Unnamed WA38395 Nature Reserve	Ia	70	29 July 1983	32°07′18″S 118°00′59″E	AVW
Unnamed WA38401 Nature Reserve	Ia	107	29 July 1983	30°09′41″S 116°31′23″E	AVW
Unnamed WA38450 Nature Reserve	Ia	1,009	23 September 1983	32°53′50″S 119°37′48″E	MAL
Unnamed WA38522 Nature Reserve	Ia	69	4 November 1983	31°55′10″S 117°58′12″E	AVW
Unnamed WA38567 Nature Reserve	Ia	64	2 December 1983	32°16′02″S 118°00′32″E	AVW
Unnamed WA38574 Nature Reserve	Ia	92	3 February 1984	30°28′17″S 117°58′42″E	AVW
Unnamed WA38731 Nature Reserve	Ia	72	4 May 1984	33°29′20″S 116°53′05″E	JAF
Unnamed WA38800 Nature Reserve	Ia	66	6 July 1984	30°39′33″S 118°37′44″E	COO
Unnamed WA39038 Nature Reserve	Ia	185	22 March 1985	30°31′41″S 117°20′49″E	AVW
Unnamed WA39322 Nature Reserve	Ia	75	6 December 1985	30°50′42″S 116°16′05″E	AVW
Unnamed WA39399 Nature Reserve	Ia	139	21 March 1986	33°50′26″S 117°21′53″E	JAF
Unnamed WA39563 Nature Reserve	Ia	29	26 September 1986	30°04′54″S 116°44′40″E	AVW
Unnamed WA39571 Nature Reserve	Ia	39	17 October 1986	30°46′25″S 115°36′26″E	GES, SWA
Unnamed WA39703 Nature Reserve	Ia	8	24 December 1986	30°27′54″S 118°03′08″E	AVW
Unnamed WA39744 Nature Reserve	Ia	4,408	24 February 1989	29°44′29″S 115°11′35″E	GES
Unnamed WA39971 Nature Reserve	Ia	30	8 May 1987	34°05′40″S 118°28′30″E	ESP
Unnamed WA40035 Nature Reserve	Ia	10	5 June 1987	33°25′13″S 117°48′11″E	AVW
Unnamed WA40257 Nature Reserve	Ia	232	4 December 1987	30°56′51″S 116°37′09″E	AVW
Unnamed WA40460 Nature Reserve	Ia	767	18 March 1988	31°27′07″S 119°00′45″E	AVW
Unnamed WA40564 Nature Reserve	Ia	6	22 July 1988	33°11′55″S 115°42′02″E	SWA
Unnamed WA40642 Nature Reserve	Ia	16	16 September 1988	31°53′49″S 116°51′46″E	AVW
Unnamed WA40910 Nature Reserve	Ia	342	5 May 1989	34°18′34″S 116°52′02″E	JAF
Unnamed WA40916 Nature Reserve	Ia	1,012	29 September 1989	30°43′23″S 115°25′14″E	SWA
Unnamed WA41042 Nature Reserve	Ia	99	25 August 1989	30°50′19″S 116°23′30″E	AVW
Unnamed WA41180 Nature Reserve	Ia	50	5 January 1990	32°15′49″S 117°06′17″E	AVW
Unnamed WA41184 Nature Reserve	Ia	16	22 December 1989	32°36′59″S 115°51′13″E	SWA
Unnamed WA41568 Nature Reserve	Ia	23	15 February 1991	33°39′01″S 115°21′39″E	SWA
Unnamed WA41573 Nature Reserve	Ia	25	18 January 1991	31°14′42″S 116°26′01″E	JAF
Unnamed WA41597 Nature Reserve	Ia	30	1 March 1991	33°39′53″S 115°18′22″E	SWA
Unnamed WA41934 Nature Reserve	Ia	6,738	15 November 1991	33°19′13″S 123°40′05″E	MAL
Unnamed WA41938 Nature Reserve	Ia	3,210	15 November 1991	31°35′03″S 116°09′00″E	JAF
Unnamed WA42044 Nature Reserve	Ia	4	3 April 1992	32°10′47″S 116°00′27″E	SWA
Unnamed WA42117 Nature Reserve	Ia	474	24 July 1992	32°55′22″S 118°24′38″E	MAL
Unnamed WA42377 Nature Reserve	Ia	50	22 January 1993	34°14′09″S 115°18′16″E	WAR
Unnamed WA42469 Nature Reserve	Ia	58	8 January 1992	32°07′49″S 115°45′38″E	SWA
Unnamed WA42481 Nature Reserve	Ia	32	22 January 1993	30°00′35″S 115°14′23″E	GES
Unnamed WA42743 Nature Reserve	Ia	155	15 June 1993	31°20′43″S 116°01′03″E	SWA
Unnamed WA42879 Nature Reserve	Ia	6	2 November 1993	33°39′43″S 115°19′14″E	SWA
Unnamed WA42942 Nature Reserve	Ia	4	14 January 1994	34°15′43″S 115°16′15″E	WAR
Unnamed WA42943 Nature Reserve	Ia	11,571	14 January 1994	32°38′46″S 121°35′50″E	COO, MAL
Unnamed WA43031 Nature Reserve	Ia	399	17 May 1994	33°57′19″S 116°05′16″E	JAF
Unnamed WA43056 Nature Reserve	Ia	9	14 June 1994	34°23′49″S 116°06′00″E	WAR
Unnamed WA43060 Nature Reserve	Ia	300	14 June 1994	33°43′25″S 120°21′51″E	ESP
Unnamed WA43219 Nature Reserve	Ia	194	2 December 1994	31°02′30″S 119°05′30″E	COO
Unnamed WA43221 Nature Reserve	Ia	132	20 December 1994	33°03′14″S 121°27′10″E	MAL
Unnamed WA43282 Nature Reserve	Ia	473	15 November 1996	33°01′58″S 118°00′10″E	AVW, MAL
Unnamed WA43286 Nature Reserve	Ia	64	3 February 1995	33°14′18″S 118°04′09″E	MAL
Unnamed WA43464 Nature Reserve	Ia	144	27 June 1995	33°22′34″S 117°50′36″E	AVW
Unnamed WA43811 Nature Reserve	IV	60	17 October 1995	30°15′27″S 116°07′14″E	GES
Unnamed WA43903 Nature Reserve	Ia	-^{[3]}	31 October 1995	32°18′23″S 115°42′50″E	^{[3]}
Unnamed WA43949 Nature Reserve	Ia	716	28 November 1995	33°08′42″S 121°08′56″E	MAL
Unnamed WA44004 Nature Reserve	Ia	13	12 March 1996	32°21′35″S 115°44′22″E	SWA
Unnamed WA44081 Nature Reserve	Ia	1,430	23 January 1996	30°22′53″S 115°48′33″E	SWA
Unnamed WA44446 Nature Reserve	Ia	986	6 September 1996	30°45′20″S 118°38′40″E	COO
Unnamed WA44622 Nature Reserve	Ia	4	4 March 1997	31°35′17″S 115°57′46″E	SWA
Unnamed WA44838 Nature Reserve	Ia	32	6 May 1997	33°35′36″S 115°26′53″E	SWA
Unnamed WA44853 Nature Reserve	Ia	2	17 February 1998	31°51′28″S 115°55′25″E	SWA
Unnamed WA44977 Nature Reserve	Ia	27	9 December 1997	32°42′55″S 115°42′23″E	SWA
Unnamed WA44978 Nature Reserve	Ia	35	9 December 1997	32°42′50″S 115°42′52″E	SWA
Unnamed WA44986 Nature Reserve	Ia	258	11 November 1997	32°29′40″S 115°47′52″E	SWA
Unnamed WA45082 Nature Reserve	Ia	175	14 October 1997	32°21′55″S 117°25′40″E	AVW
Unnamed WA45089 Nature Reserve	Ia	11	14 October 1997	32°32′36″S 115°42′53″E	SWA
Unnamed WA45337 Nature Reserve	Ia	152	2 September 1998	30°47′47″S 116°03′26″E	JAF
Unnamed WA45533 Nature Reserve	Ia	10	9 December 1999	33°47′39″S 115°12′48″E	JAF
Unnamed WA46004 Nature Reserve	Ia	401	23 December 1999	31°11′38″S 118°13′25″E	AVW
Unnamed WA46006 Nature Reserve	Ia	24	27 March 2000	33°39′52″S 115°34′26″E	SWA
Unnamed WA46070 Nature Reserve	Ia	28	2 March 2000	33°40′58″S 115°31′49″E	SWA
Unnamed WA46074 Nature Reserve	Ia	26	9 May 2001	31°59′40″S 117°09′55″E	AVW
Unnamed WA46108 Nature Reserve	Ia	12	29 March 2000	33°19′46″S 115°45′37″E	SWA
Unnamed WA46116 Nature Reserve	Ia	524	16 November 2001	32°18′22″S 118°14′15″E	MAL
Unnamed WA46128 Nature Reserve	Ia	232	15 June 2000	32°53′49″S 117°52′49″E	AVW
Unnamed WA46260 Nature Reserve	Ia	457	12 November 2001	33°19′02″S 118°17′00″E	MAL
Unnamed WA46401 Nature Reserve	Ia	1,785	17 November 2000	30°48′12″S 118°18′40″E	AVW
Unnamed WA46564 Nature Reserve	Ia	23	10 April 2001	31°37′23″S 116°03′25″E	JAF
Unnamed WA46566 Nature Reserve	Ia	297	9 May 2001	32°54′53″S 118°05′00″E	MAL
Unnamed WA46587 Nature Reserve	Ia	2	9 May 2001	32°21′33″S 115°58′29″E	SWA
Unnamed WA46595 Nature Reserve	Ia	40	31 May 2001	33°14′25″S 116°50′46″E	JAF
Unnamed WA46661 Nature Reserve	Ia	93	24 September 2001	32°33′28″S 115°43′34″E	SWA
Unnamed WA46713 Nature Reserve	Ia	287	11 January 2002	30°04′05″S 115°19′13″E	GES
Unnamed WA46818 Nature Reserve	Ia	8	5 July 2002	32°17′43″S 115°59′17″E	SWA
Unnamed WA46847 Nature Reserve	Ia	247	15 July 2002	29°23′37″S 121°25′55″E	MUR
Unnamed WA46875 Nature Reserve	Ia	159	29 August 2002	31°44′49″S 115°59′25″E	SWA
Unnamed WA46899 Nature Reserve	Ia	519	5 February 2003	31°00′19″S 115°51′34″E	SWA
Unnamed WA46919 Nature Reserve	Ia	126	10 October 2002	31°44′52″S 115°58′35″E	SWA
Unnamed WA46920 Nature Reserve	Ia	21	10 October 2002	31°46′00″S 115°57′22″E	SWA
Unnamed WA47311 Nature Reserve	Ia	194	27 November 2003	30°57′59″S 117°50′52″E	AVW
Unnamed WA47436 Nature Reserve	Ia	65	9 February 2004	29°32′57″S 115°08′56″E	GES
Unnamed WA47558 Nature Reserve	Ia	80	23 June 2004	33°14′48″S 117°03′48″E	AVW
Unnamed WA47694 Nature Reserve	Ia	152	20 August 2004	30°32′39″S 116°02′03″E	AVW
Unnamed WA47808 Nature Reserve	Ia	415	4 August 2004	31°01′33″S 115°52′05″E	SWA
Unnamed WA47960 Nature Reserve	Ia	107	21 January 2005	31°24′34″S 117°00′49″E	AVW
Unnamed WA48024 Nature Reserve	Ia	97	28 January 2005	32°47′09″S 118°18′43″E	MAL
Unnamed WA48098 Nature Reserve	Ia	209	17 February 2005	29°39′16″S 115°24′52″E	GES
Unnamed WA48173 Nature Reserve	Ia	408	2 March 2006	28°47′38″S 114°58′55″E	GES
Unnamed WA48742 Nature Reserve	Ia	495	22 February 2012	32°14′13″S 118°54′30″E	MAL
Unnamed WA48837 Nature Reserve	Ia	64	31 August 2007	33°39′34″S 115°19′59″E	SWA
Unnamed WA48858 Nature Reserve	Ia	0^{[4]}	5 October 2006	30°45′37″S 115°09′59″E	^{[4]}
Unnamed WA49071 Nature Reserve	Ia	76	31 March 2009	30°32′15″S 117°33′50″E	AVW
Unnamed WA49079 Nature Reserve	Ia	10	21 February 2007	31°55′56″S 116°00′56″E	SWA
Unnamed WA49299 Nature Reserve	Ia	5	29 October 2007	32°04′59″S 115°57′13″E	SWA
Unnamed WA49300 Nature Reserve	Ia	27	30 January 2008	31°45′40″S 115°59′48″E	SWA
Unnamed WA49362 Nature Reserve	Ia	13	25 March 2008	32°01′51″S 115°54′32″E	SWA
Unnamed WA49385 Nature Reserve	Ia	1	22 December 2008	33°39′10″S 115°21′16″E	SWA
Unnamed WA49706 Nature Reserve	Ia	145	18 July 2008	33°28′07″S 118°09′06″E	MAL
Unnamed WA49722 Nature Reserve	Ia	90	2 December 2008	34°46′19″S 117°39′50″E	JAF
Unnamed WA49730 Nature Reserve	Ia	53	9 September 2008	33°00′19″S 115°48′00″E	SWA
Unnamed WA49857 Nature Reserve	Ia	35	6 October 2008	33°29′20″S 115°45′00″E	JAF, SWA
Unnamed WA49999 Nature Reserve	Ia	136	27 November 2008	32°51′11″S 118°23′05″E	MAL
Unnamed WA50017 Nature Reserve	Ia	2	20 February 2009	33°39′09″S 115°21′29″E	SWA
Unnamed WA50069 Nature Reserve	Ia	252	13 May 2009	31°48′58″S 116°03′55″E	JAF
Unnamed WA50165 Nature Reserve	Ia	330	30 April 2009	32°44′06″S 117°08′59″E	AVW
Unnamed WA50190 Nature Reserve	Ia	3	19 May 2009	33°34′21″S 115°33′07″E	SWA
Unnamed WA50588 Nature Reserve	Ia	19	1 June 2010	15°44′13″S 128°40′40″E	VIB
Unnamed WA50678 Nature Reserve	Ia	164	24 August 2010	31°28′54″S 115°57′56″E	SWA
Unnamed WA50750 Nature Reserve	Ia	14	19 April 2011	32°30′01″S 115°50′06″E	SWA
Unnamed WA50864 Nature Reserve	Ia	763	13 April 2011	31°57′40″S 118°44′24″E	AVW
Unnamed WA51093 Nature Reserve	Ia	559	16 December 2011	30°50′13″S 116°42′10″E	AVW
Unnamed WA51375 Nature Reserve	Ia	206	3 April 2014	28°36′27″S 114°41′49″E	GES
Unnamed WA51564 Nature Reserve	Ia	648	31 May 2016	28°49′34″S 115°49′32″E	AVW
Unnamed WA51602 Nature Reserve	Ia	399	11 November 2013	32°20′32″S 118°16′47″E	MAL
Unnamed WA51784 Nature Reserve	Ia	1,312	2 December 2014	32°19′21″S 115°54′46″E	SWA
Unnamed WA52366 Nature Reserve	Ia	44	10 November 2016	19°55′44″S 120°03′29″E	DAL
Unnamed WA52583 Nature Reserve	Ia	1	16 March 2017	30°16′40″S 116°39′28″E	AVW
Unnamed WA53015 Nature Reserve	Ia	4,838	1 February 2018	19°27′27″S 121°13′38″E	DAL
Unnamed WA53453 Nature Reserve	Ia	5	3 February 2020	31°39′25″S 116°02′19″E	SWA
Unnamed WA53600 Nature Reserve	Ia	2	7 October 2021	33°21′39″S 115°42′44″E	SWA
Unnamed WA53649 Nature Reserve	Ia	19	10 November 2020	32°08′33″S 115°57′33″E	SWA
Unnamed WA53955 Nature Reserve	Ia	658	9 December 2021	30°33′49″S 117°43′13″E	AVW
Unnamed WA53974 Nature Reserve	Ia	110	24 February 2022	32°49′30″S 117°07′06″E	AVW
Unnamed WA53975 Nature Reserve	Ia	2,227	24 February 2022	33°04′48″S 117°00′13″E	AVW, JAF

=== Notes ===
- ^[1] Unnamed WA14567 Nature Reserve is a strip of land along the Vasse Highway located in the locality of Yoongarillup.
- ^[2] Unnamed WA28710 Nature Reserve is a strip of land along the Midland Railway located south of Moora.
- ^[3] Unnamed WA43903 Nature Reserve is a spit located off the coast of the coast of Safety Bay which is part of the Swan Coastal Plain bioregion.
- ^[4] Unnamed WA48858 Nature Reserve is a rock located off the coast of the Wanagarren Nature Reserve in the Swan Coastal Plain bioregion.

=== Key for IBRA ===
Interim Biogeographic Regionalisation for Australia:

- AVW: Avon Wheatbelt
- CAR: Carnarvon xeric shrublands
- CEK: Central Kimberley
- COO: Coolgardie bioregion
- DAL: Dampierland
- ESP: Esperance Plains
- GAS: Gascoyne bioregion
- GES: Geraldton Sandplains
- GID: Gibson Desert
- GSD: Great Sandy Desert
- GVD: Great Victoria Desert
- HAM: Hampton bioregion
- ITI: Indian Tropical Islands
- JAF: Jarrah Forest
- LSD: Little Sandy Desert
- MAL: Mallee bioregion
- MUR: Murchison (Western Australia)
- NOK: Northern Kimberley
- NUL: Nullarbor Plain
- OVP: Ord Victoria Plain
- PIL: Pilbara shrublands
- SWA: Swan Coastal Plain
- VIB: Victoria Bonaparte
- WAR: Warren bioregion
- YAL: Yalgoo bioregion

== See also ==
- List of named nature reserves of Western Australia
- List of national parks of Western Australia
- List of conservation parks of Western Australia
- List of Indigenous Protected Areas of Western Australia
