= List of nature reserves of Western Australia =

The following lists of nature reserves of Western Australia are arranged by named and unnamed:

- List of named nature reserves of Western Australia
- List of unnamed nature reserves of Western Australia
