= Southern Tanami Indigenous Protected Area =

Protected area in Northern Territory, Australia

Coordinates: 21°33′S 130°41′E

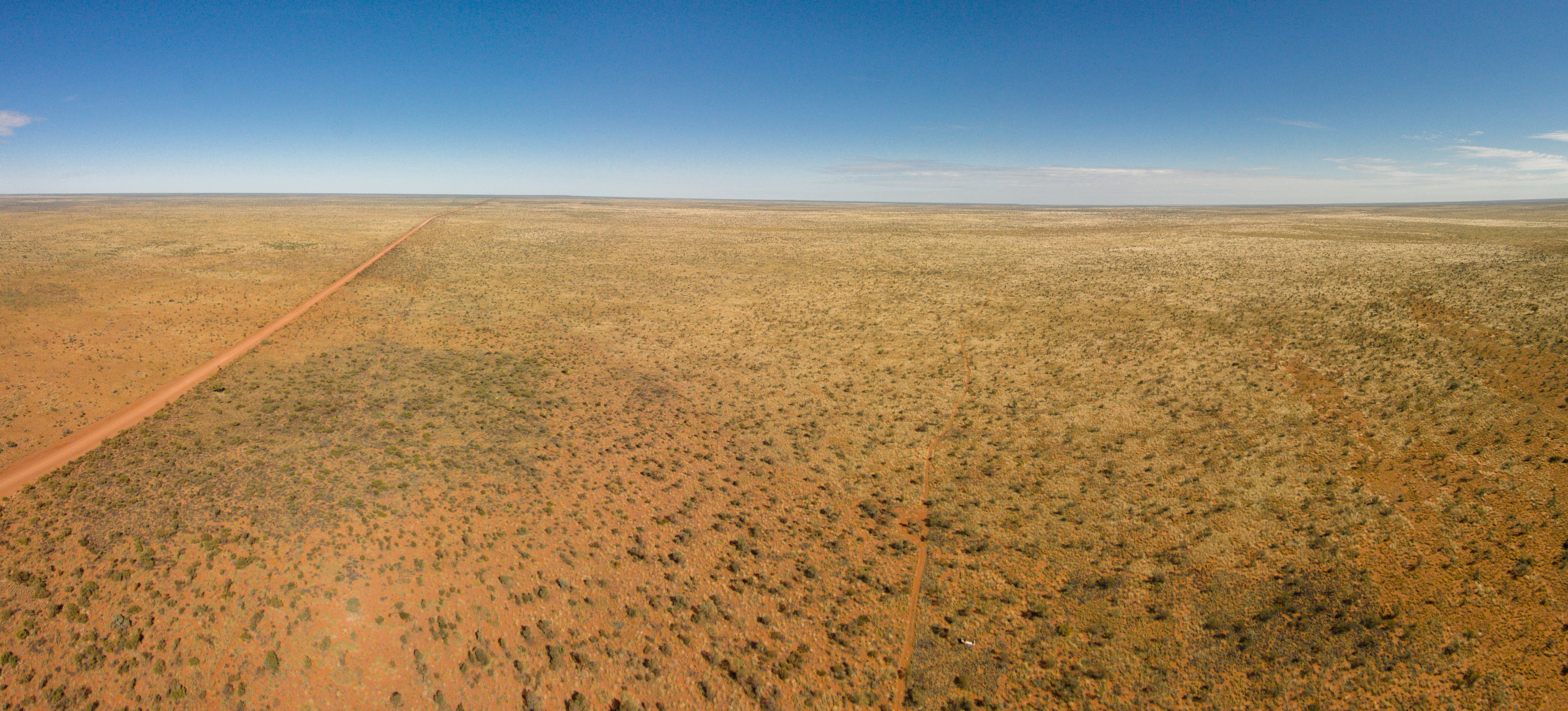
Tanami Desert

The Southern Tanami Indigenous Protected Area (IPA) is Walpiri-managed region of the Tanami Desert in Central Australia. At 101,600 km^{2}, it is Australia's largest IPA.

IPAs are areas of land and sea Country managed by First Nations groups for biodiversity conservation and cultural outcomes through voluntary agreements with the Australian Government. These areas form part of Australia's National Reserve System.

Dedicated in July 2012, the area has significant cultural and natural value. It is managed by the Warlpiri Rangers, of the Central Land Council's ranger groups combining Yapa (Aboriginal) and Kardiya (non-Aboriginal) knowledges.

The Southern Tanami IPA includes the Reynolds and Truer ranges, as well as sand dunes and salt pans. It has large areas of spinifex hummock grassland with a flowering shrub overstorey. This provides habitat to threatened species such as the walpajirri (bilby), warrarna (great desert skink) and jajina (brush-tailed mulgara).
