= Crocodile Islands Maringa Indigenous Protected Area =

The Crocodile Islands Maringa Indigenous Protected Area (IPA) is a region inclusive of the 20 islands of the Crocodile Islands archipelago, managed by Millingimbi Outstations Progress Resource Aboriginal Corporation through the Crocodile Islands Rangers. It is located around 440 kilometres east of Darwin covering an area of approximately 8,000 square kilometres.

IPAs are areas of land and sea Country managed by First Nations groups for biodiversity conservation and cultural outcomes through voluntary agreements with the Australian Government. These areas for part of Australia's National Reserve System.

The Crocodile Islands Maringa IPA was declared in 2023.

The area consists of mangroves, mudflats, coastal floodplains, monsoon forests, eucalypt forests, shallow seas and reefs that are home to 44 threatened species and some of northern Australia's biggest aggregations of shorebirds, including great knots.
