= Anindilyakwa =

Anindilyakwa may refer to:

- Anindilyakwa people, an ethnic group of Australia
- Anindilyakwa language, an Australian language
- Anindilyakwa Indigenous Protected Area, a protected area in the Northern Territory of Australia
