= Laynhapuy Indigenous Protected Area =

Protected area in Northern Territory, Australia

Coordinates: 12°26′S 136°19′E

The Laynhapuy Indigenous Protected Area (IPA) is a 14,728 km^{2} (5,687 sq mi) area of both land and marine estate located in north-east Arnhem Land in the Northern Territory of Australia, managed by Yolŋu people. The area was extended in 2018.

IPAs are areas of land and sea Country managed by First Nations groups for biodiversity conservation and cultural outcomes through voluntary agreements with the Australian Government. These areas for part of Australia's National Reserve System.

Dedicated in 2006, the Laynhapuy IPA is managed by about 40 Yirralka Rangers who are administer by the Laynhapuy Homelands Aboriginal Corporation. Their logo features the Ganybu, a traditional triaingular fishing net.

The Laynhapuy IPA has records of 48 listed threatened species and 52 listed migratory species, identifying priority species Yolŋu and/or Western science.

The ranger group implements a cultural and natural resource management plan across the IPA. This includes managing culturally significant sites, fire, weeds and feral animals as well as monitoring and protecting endangered marine animals such as turtles and dugongs.
