= Conservation park (Australia) =

Type of protected area in Australia

In Australia, a conservation park is a type of specially protected status for land held by the Crown for conservation purposes. A conservation park may consist of multiple conservation units. As of June 2014, the term ‘Conservation Park’ is used only by the relevant government agencies in Queensland, South Australia and Western Australia.

== List of Conservation Parks ==
Refer:

- List of conservation parks in Queensland
- List of conservation parks in South Australia
- List of conservation parks of Western Australia

== See also ==
- Conservation in Australia
- Protected areas of Australia
