= Warul Kawa Indigenous Protected Area =

Warul Kara Indigenous Protected Area
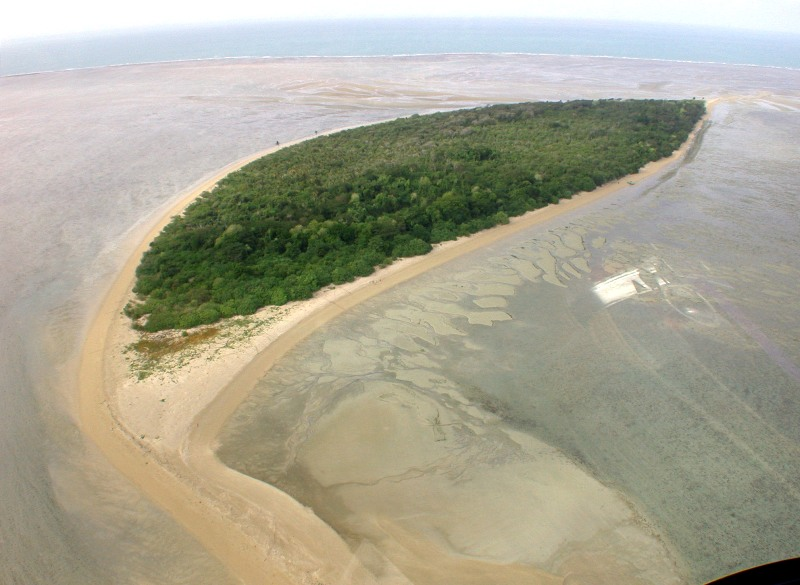
- Deliverance Island from the north, 2002

- Location within Queensland
- Location: Queensland
- Coordinates: 9.517°S 141.572°E
- Established: February 2001

Deliverance Island
Native name: Warul Kawa
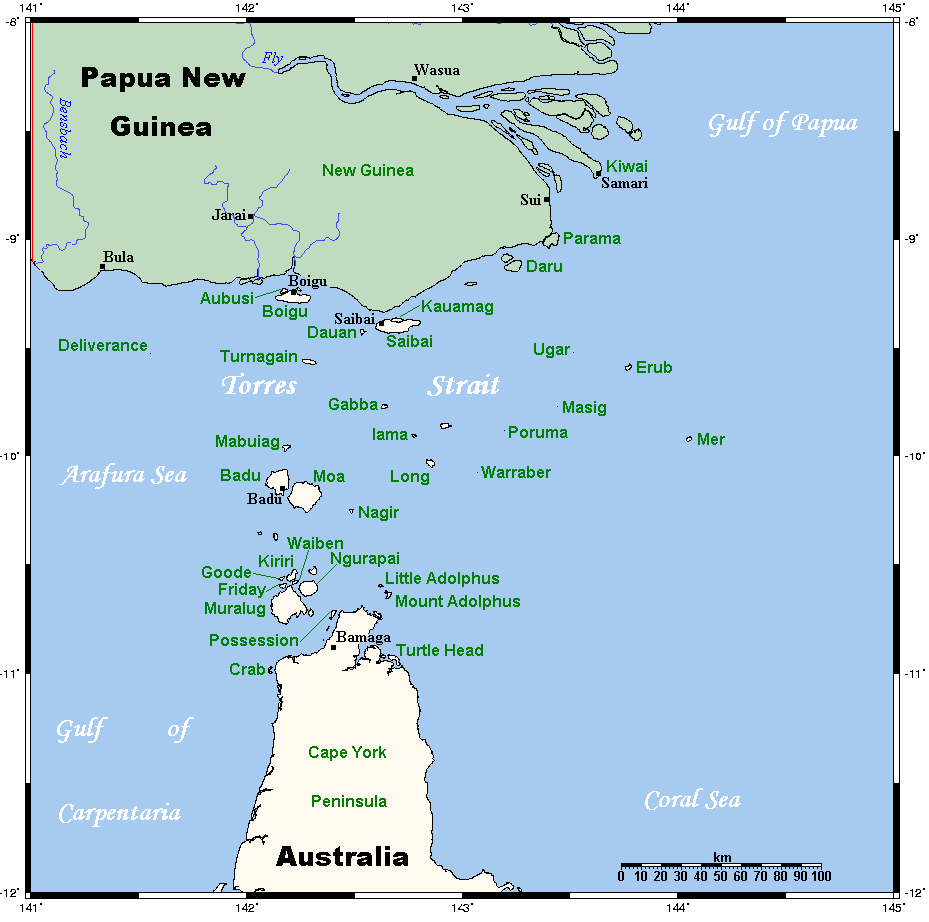
- A map of the Torres Strait Islands showing Deliverance Island in the far north-western waters of Torres Strait

Geography
- Location: Northern Australia
- Archipelago: Torres Strait Islands
- Adjacent to: Torres Strait; Arafura Sea

Administration
- Australia
- State: Queensland

Warul Kawa Indigenous Protected Area (also known as Deliverance Island) is a small island that is part of Australia's National Reserve System, located 34 kilometres (21 mi) south of Papua New Guinea and about 200 kilometres (120 mi) north of Thursday Island, Torres Strait. The protected area and island are the most north westerly of the Torres Strait Islands located in the water of Torres Strait, part of Queensland in Australia, and 74 kilometres (46 mi) from Indonesia, at the border of Papua province.

== Geology ==
It is a sand cay surrounded by a shallow reef platform interspersed with sandy patches, with little live coral present.

Brown and Green algae are predominating on the rocky substrate with some seagrass present. The island and surrounding reef support two internationally significant populations of sea turtles. It contains one of the largest rookeries for the Flatback turtle (Natator depressus). The extensive shallow water habitats in the area also support large numbers of migrating green turtles. The breeding assemblages in north and eastern Australia are the largest remaining rookeries for green turtles. The island and surrounding reef system have retained their high natural value due largely to their remoteness. Although Warul Kawa has been inhabited periodically by Europeans in the past, there has been little impact on the natural environment as evident by the presence of only two-recorded exotic plant species. The area has maintained high vegetation integrity of considerable diversity and complexity. These habitats support thirty-three species of birds, including the yellow-footed scrubfowl, not reported on many other islands in Torres Strait.

== Cultural significance ==
Due to the spiritual and cultural significance that the island has for local Indigenous people, Deliverance Island was declared an Indigenous Protected Area (IPA) in February 2001. The local Indigenous name for the island, Warul Kawa, means "Island of turtles" in the Torres Strait Island language.

Somerset Maugham's character German Harry from his book Cosmopolitans, a Danish mariner from Langebæk who was in fact known as Old Harry but christened as Johannes Henrik Enevoldsen (22 August 1850 – 21 January 1928), lived on the island as a hermit from about 1888 until his death.

== See also ==
- Indigenous Protected Areas
- List of Torres Strait Islands
