= Marthakal Indigenous Protected Area =

Protected area in Northern Territory, Australia

Coordinates: 12°26′S 136°19′E

The Marri-Jabin Indigenous Protected Area (IPA) is a 3,230 km^{2} (1,250 sq mi) area in Galiwin'ku on Elcho Island, in the Northern Territory of Australia.

IPAs are areas of land and sea Country managed by First Nations groups for biodiversity conservation and cultural outcomes through voluntary agreements with the Australian Government. These areas for part of Australia's National Reserve System.

Dedicated in 2016, the Marthakal IPA is managed by about the Marthakal Homelands and Resource Centre Aboriginal Corporation and Northern Land Council, they undertake weed, rare & threatened species monitoring and other land management activities such a removing ghost nets.

The Marthakal IPA is known for its nationally-recognised species, including the Northern Quoll, Golden Bandicoot, Brush-tailed Rabbit-rat, Floodplain Monitor and Martens’ Water Monitor.

The area is the last remnant of the ancient land bridge connecting Australia with Southeast Asia, offering insights into the first colonisation of Australia by First Nations people, as well as contact history between Yolngu people and the Maccassans, dating back at least 400 years.
