= Dhimurru Indigenous Protected Area =

Protected area in Northern Territory, Australia

Coordinates: 12°20′S 136°49′E

The Dhimurru Indigenous Protected Area (IPA) is a region inclusive around 5,500 square kilometres (2,100 sq mi) of Yolŋu land and sea country in northeast Arnhem Land in the Northern Territory of Australia. It is managed by Dhimurru Aboriginal Corporation through the Dhimurru’s Rangers.

IPAs are areas of land and sea Country managed by First Nations groups for biodiversity conservation and cultural outcomes through voluntary agreements with the Australian Government. These areas for part of Australia's National Reserve System.

Declared on 1 December 2000, it was the first IPA declared in the Northern Territory and one of the earliest in Australia. It was also the first to include both terrestrial and marine areas. In April 2013 Yolŋu Wanga Watangu (Traditional Owners) dedicated additional areas of their land and sea country to Dhimurru Indigenous Protected Area.

Approximately 13 rangers manage the IPA undertaking feral animals and weed control, fire management and community engagement.
