= Indigenous Protected Area =

Area of land or sea in Australia managed by traditional owners

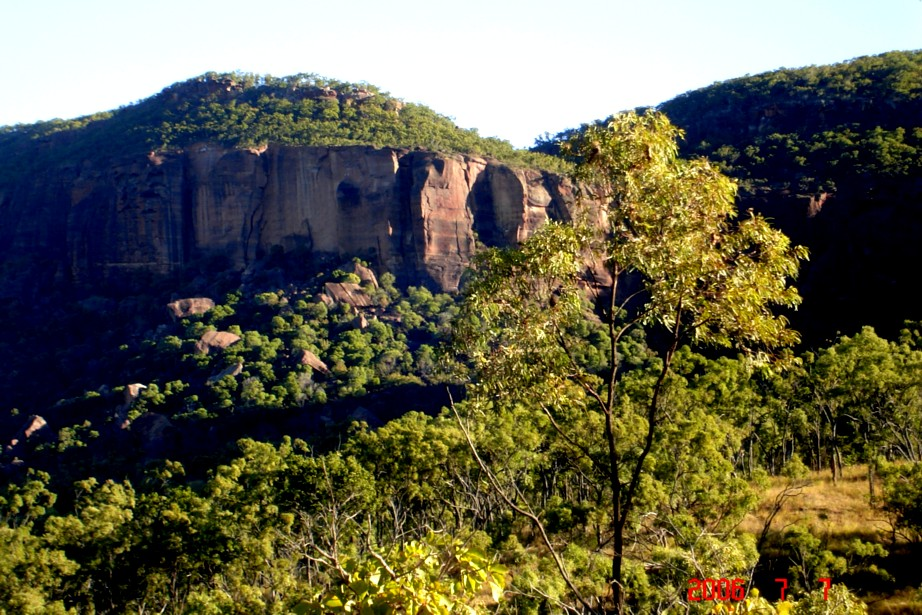
The proposed Ngarrabullgin Indigenous Protected Area.

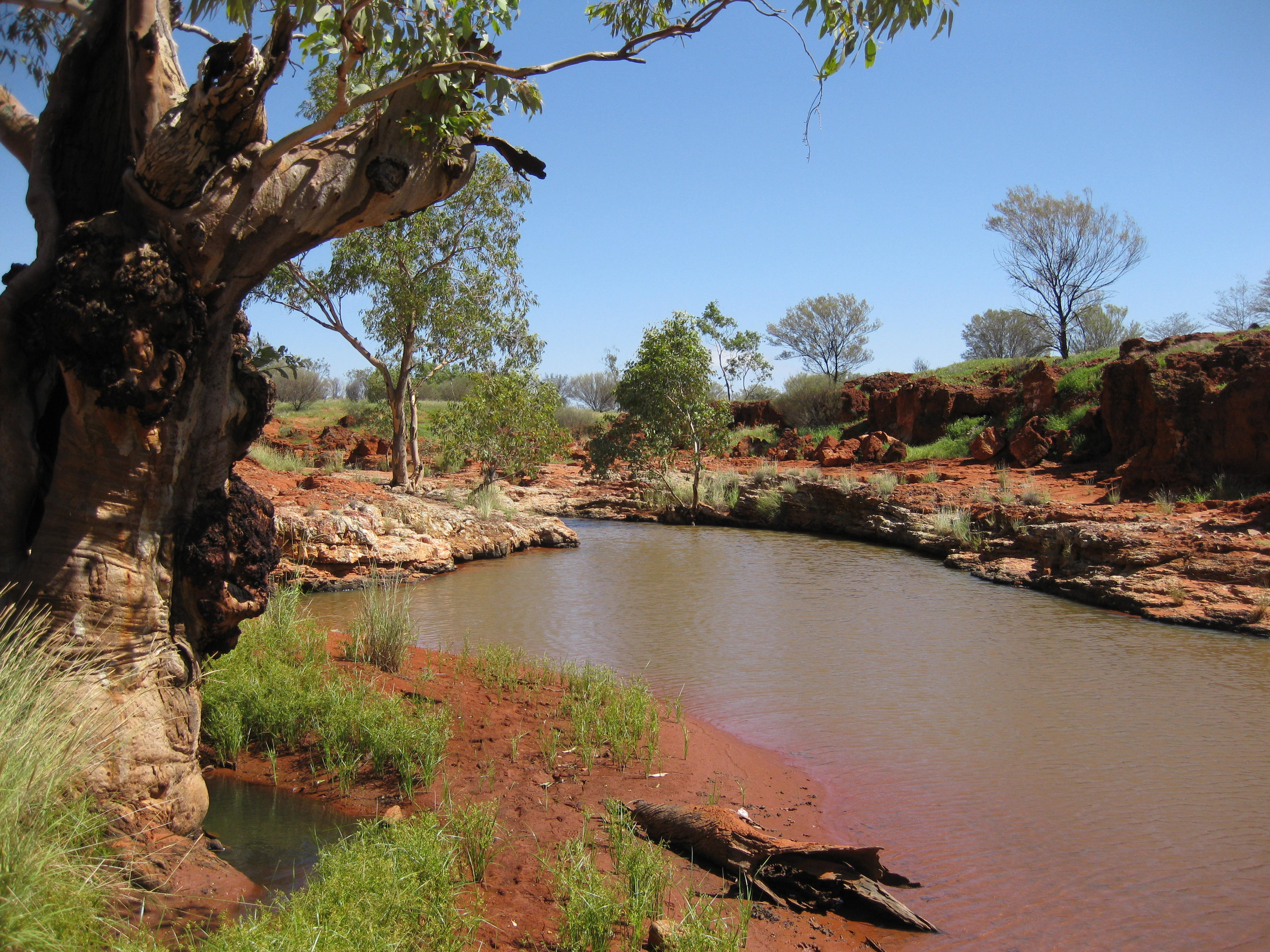
Yaua waterhole after rain, Angas Downs IPA.

An Indigenous Protected Area (IPA) is a class of protected area used in Australia; each is formed by voluntary agreement with Indigenous Australians, and declared by Aboriginal Australians and Torres Strait Islander representative organisations. Each is formally recognised by the Australian Government as being part of its National Reserve System. The areas may comprise land and sea, and are managed by Indigenous groups for the conservation of biodiversity. Managing IPAs also helps to protect the cultural values of their country for future generations, and has benefits for Indigenous health, education, economic and social cohesion.

As of 2020, there were 78 IPAs, covering around 46.53% of the National Reserve system. In September 2021, a further seven IPAs were declared, which will lead to IPAs comprising more than half of Australia's National Reserve System.

Indigenous rangers are employed to work in IPAs as well as in other remote areas of Australia, on land management and related projects.

== History ==
During the 1990s the Australian Government was working in cooperation with State and Territory Governments to build a National Reserve System aimed at protecting, for future generations, a representative sample of Australia's diverse range of flora, fauna and eco-systems.

As part of this effort, Aboriginal Australian and Torres Strait Islander owners of lands and seas were asked, and many who were interested in re-establishing effective indigenous land management agreed to participate in this endeavour.

At a national conference of Aboriginal Australians and Torres Strait Islanders held in 1997, it was agreed and resolved by the delegates present that a new class of "Indigenous" protected area should be formed as follows:

An Indigenous Protected Area is [to be] governed by the continuing responsibilities of Aboriginal and Torres Strait Islander peoples to care for and protect lands and waters for present and future generations... Indigenous Protected Areas may include areas of land and waters over which Aboriginal and Torres Strait Islanders are custodians, and which shall be managed for cultural biodiversity and conservation, permitting customary sustainable resource use and sharing of benefit.

The first trialling of this new environmental partnership aimed at adding the new class of Protected Areas to Australia's National Reserve System, was with the Adnyamathanha people of Nepabunna Aboriginal community, volunteering 580 square kilometres (220 sq mi) of rugged limestone hills, siltstone flats, springs and waterholes between the Flinders Ranges and Gammon Ranges National Parks to be managed as an Indigenous Protected Area.

The land selected for the first proposed Indigenous Protected area was held by the South Australian Aboriginal Lands Trust (on a 99-year lease, for the Adnyamathanha people), and, by 26 August 1998, an agreement had been reached to see the people of Nepabunna Aboriginal community engaged and some employed in restoring the landscape to its former natural and cultural value, and Australia's first Indigenous Protected Area, the Nantawarrina Indigenous Protected Area was declared. At the opening ceremony in 1998, Nantawarrina was declared "the first Indigenous Protected Area in South Australia and internationally" by Gurtrude Johnson, an Adnyamathanha traditional owner. Nantawarrina was formerly a pastoral lease.

By 2007 the kind of partnership agreed and started with the Nantawarrina Indigenous Protected Area had grown to include 23 declared Indigenous Protected Areas covering close to 170,000 km^{2} (66,000 sq mi), or 23 per cent of the National Reserve System. By agreeing to establish Indigenous Protected Areas, Aboriginal Australians and Torres Strait Islander peoples contributed two-thirds of all new additions to Australia's National Reserve System over the decade 1997–2007.

In July 2012, The Nature Conservancy, alongside the Central Land Council and government representatives from Australia’s National Reserve System, helped announce the launch of the Southern Tanami Indigenous Protected Area. This Indigenous Protected Area is Australia’s largest land reserve, spanning 10,150,000 hectares (25,100,000 acres). It protects important pieces of the Northern Territory’s natural legacy. Included in the Southern Tanami reserve are much of Lake Mackay—Australia’s second-largest lake—and an enormous swathe of the Tanami Desert. This IPA links a variety of habitats that includes deserts and savannas, giving plant and animal species the space they need to manoeuvre around threats like bushfires and climate change.

Two new areas were declared in Western Australia in 2020, bringing the total number to 78.

In September 2021, a further seven IPAs were declared, which will lead to IPAs comprising more than half of Australia's National Reserve System.

In May 2022, the incoming Labor government under Anthony Albanese committed to boosting the funding for managing the IPAs to the tune of A$10 million annually; also to doubling the number of Indigenous rangers to 38,000 by 2030, and also to improving gender diversity in employment.

== Criteria and description ==
Aboriginal Australian and Torres Strait Islander land and sea owners (including native title holders) may be encouraged, or themselves apply to the Australian Government to establish an Indigenous Protected Area on their lands/seas. However, an Indigenous Protected Area can only come into existence where:

- land and/or seas are owned by Aboriginal Australian or Torres Strait Islander peoples; and
- significant biodiversity occurs within such Aboriginal/Torres Strait Islander-owned lands or seas; and
- the Aboriginal Australians or Torres Strait Islanders concerned enter into a formal conservation agreement with the Australian Government to manage some of their lands or seas as an IUCN standard "protected area".

Most IPAs are dedicated under IUCN Categories 5 and 6, which promote a balance between conservation and other sustainable uses to deliver social, cultural and economic benefits for local Indigenous communities. Indigenous rangers are employed to work in IPAs as well as in other remote areas of Australia, on land management and related projects.

== IPA data ==
IPA data is available online from several sources.

- Three maps offering different views of all IPA project locations are available on the National Indigenous Australians Agency's IPA page: an interactive map and project summaries; Indigenous Protected Areas (PDF) and the Indigenous Protected Areas - Commonwealth Funded Indigenous Ranger Groups (PDF), which also lists the ranger group names.
- Department of Agriculture, Water and the Environment's Collaborative Australian Protected Area Database (CAPAD). Updated on a two-year schedule, but some data values may be incorrect or out-of-date. Data provided via Excel spreadsheets, by state and territory.
- The World Database on Protected Areas (WDPA), "the most comprehensive global database of marine and terrestrial protected areas", is a produced by the UN Environment Programme and the International Union for Conservation of Nature (IUCN). Says it is updated monthly, but the Australian section as of September 2021 shows the Australian Government source as 2020 (lists 78 IPAs under "Indigenous peoples").

== List of Indigenous Protected Areas ==
=== Federal ===
- Booderee National Park and Botanic Gardens, in the Jervis Bay Territory, managed by the Wreck Bay Aboriginal Community

=== New South Wales ===
New South Wales IPAs include:

- Brewarrina Ngemba Billabong Indigenous Protected Area
- Boorabee and The Willows Indigenous Protected Area
- Gumma Indigenous Protected Area
- Minyumai Indigenous Protected Area
- Ngunya Jargoon Indigenous Protected Area
- Tarriwa Kurrukun Indigenous Protected Area
- Toogimbie Indigenous Protected Area
- Wattleridge Indigenous Protected Area
- Weilmoringle Indigenous Protected Area

=== Northern Territory ===
Northern Territory IPAs include:

- Angas Downs Indigenous Protected Area
- Anindilyakwa Indigenous Protected Area
- Crocodile Islands Maringa Indigenous Protected Area
- Dhimurru Indigenous Protected Area – declared in 2000, it was the first land/sea IPA in Australia
- Djelk Indigenous Protected Area
- GanaIanga-Mindibirrina Indigenous Protected Area
- Katiti Petermann Indigenous Protected Area - declared on 1 October 2015, more than 5,000,000 hectares (12,000,000 acres) surrounding Uluṟu-Kata Tjuṯa National Park.
- Laynhapuy Indigenous Protected Area - 600,000 hectares (1,500,000 acres), created in 2006
- Wangga (Marri-Jabin) Indigenous Protected Area
- Marthakal Indigenous Protected Area
- Northern Tanami Indigenous Protected Area
- Southern Tanami Indigenous Protected Area
- South-East Arnhem Land Indigenous Protected Area
- Wardaman Indigenous Protected Area
- Warddeken Indigenous Protected Area
- Yanyuwa (Barni - Wardimantha Awara) Indigenous Protected Area

=== Queensland ===
Queensland IPAs include:

- Eastern Kuku Yalanji Indigenous Protected Area
- Guanaba Indigenous Protected Area
- Kaanju Ngaachi Wenlock and Pascoe Rivers Indigenous Protected Area
- Magani Lagaugal Indigenous Protected Area (Torres Strait Islands, declared Sep 2021)
- Mandingalbay Yidinji Indigenous Protected Area
- Masigalal Indigenous Protected Area (Torres Strait Islands, declared Sep 2021)
- Thuwathu-Bujimulla Indigenous Protected Area
- Umpila Indigenous Protected Area (Cape York, declared Sep 2021)
- Warul Kawa Indigenous Protected Area

=== South Australia ===
South Australian IPAs include:

- Antara-Sandy Bore Indigenous Protected Area
- Kalka-Pipalyatjara Indigenous Protected Area
- Mount Willoughby Indigenous Protected Area
- Nantawarrina Indigenous Protected Area
- Watarru and Walalkara Indigenous Protected Area
- Yalata Indigenous Protected Area

=== Tasmania ===
Tasmanian IPAs include:

- Babel Island
- Great Dog Island
- lungtalanana (Clarke Island)
- Mount Chappell and Badger Islands Indigenous Protected Areas
- Preminghana Indigenous Protected Area
- Risdon Cove and Putalina Indigenous Protected Areas

=== Victoria ===
Victorian IPAs include:

- Deen Maar Indigenous Protected Area
- Framlingham Forest Indigenous Protected Area
- Kurtonitj Indigenous Protected Area
- Lake Condah Indigenous Protected Area
- Tyrendarra Indigenous Protected Area

=== Western Australia ===
Western Australian IPAs include:

- Balanggarra Indigenous Protected Area
- Bardi Jawi Indigenous Protected Area
- Birriliburu Indigenous Protected Area (Little Sandy Desert, and Gascoyne, 2013, Martu people, 6,600,000 hectares (16,000,000 acres))
- Dambimangari Indigenous Protected Area
- Karajarri Indigenous Protected Area
- Kiwirrkurra Indigenous Protected Area
- Matuwa and Kurrara-Kurrara Indigenous Protected Area
- Ngaanyatjarra Indigenous Protected Area
- Ngadju Indigenous Protected Area (2020, north of Esperance, in the Western Australian Goldfields, Ngadju people, 4,399,300 ha (10,871,000 acres))
- Ngururrpa Indigenous Protected Area (2020, in the Great Sandy Desert, 2,962,988 hectares (7,321,700 acres))
- Ninghan Indigenous Protected Area
- Nyangumarta Warrarn Indigenous Protected Area
- Paruku Indigenous Protected Area
- Uunguu Indigenous Protected Area
- Warlu Jilajaa Jumu Indigenous Protected Area
- Wilinggin Indigenous Protected Area
- Yawuru Indigenous Protected Area

New areas declared September 2021:

- Mayala Indigenous Protected Area (Kimberley)
- Ngurra Kayanta Indigenous Protected Area (Great Sandy Desert)
- Nykina Mangala Indigenous Protected Area (Kimberley)
- Warramba garr wambooriny Indigenous Protected Area (Kimberley)

== 2020: New IPAs ==
As of 2022, there are 20 new proposed IPAs under consultation at the following locations:

- Tiwi Islands, north of Darwin, Northern Territory (Tiwi Land Council)
- Haasts Bluff, south-west Northern Territory (Central Land Council)
- Mamu Wet Tropics, far north Queensland (Mamu Aboriginal Corporation)
- Arafura Swamp, north-east Arnhem Land, Northern Territory (Arafura Swamp Rangers Aboriginal Corporation)
- Maralinga Tjarutja Lands, western South Australia (Oak Valley (Maralinga) Aboriginal Corporation)
- Mimal, south-east Arnhem Land, Northern Territory (Mimal Land Management).
- Wuthathi Shelburne Bay, Cape York Peninsula, Queensland (Wuthathi Aboriginal Corporation)
- Olkola, central Cape York Peninsula, Queensland (Olkola Aboriginal Corporation)
- Spinifex Pilki, south-east Western Australia (Pila Nguru Aboriginal Corporation)

== Awards ==
The World Future Council (WFC) awarded the Indigenous Protected Areas and Indigenous Rangers programs with the"Bronze Future Policy Award 2017: Desertification".

== See also ==
- Aboriginal reserve
- Community Conservation Areas
- Indian reservation (US)
- Indian reserve (Canada)
- Minister for Indigenous Australians
- Protected areas of Australia
- Territory of Traditional Natural Resource Use, in Russia
