= Djelk Indigenous Protected Area =

Protected area in Northern Territory, Australia

Coordinates: 25°3′S 130°15′E

The Djelk Indigenous Protected Area (IPA) is a 6,700-square-kilometre (2,600 sq mi) area stretching from central Arnhem Land plateau to the Arafura Sea extending west and east of Maningrida in the Northern Territory of Australia, managed by Bawinanga Rangers.

IPAs are areas of land and sea Country managed by First Nations groups for biodiversity conservation and cultural outcomes through voluntary agreements with the Australian Government. These areas for part of Australia's National Reserve System.

Dedicated in 2009, the Djelk IPA encompasses the land of 102 clans of at least 12 language groups.

The area forms part of the West Arnhem Land Fire Abatement (WALFA) Project that uses customary Indigenous fire management to reduce CO_{2}-e emissions released through wildfires, selling offset contracts.

== Ecology ==
The region encompasses several types of ecosystems, from coastal landscapes in the north to wetlands and tropical savannahs. It is home to several threatened and endangered species of animals, such as black wallaroos, white-throated grasswrens and Arnhem Land rock-rats.

Feral water buffalo roam throughout the Djelk IPA, and pose a significant threat to the biodiversity of the region. Their trampling destroys waterways and other natural habitats of native species. Other non-native, feral animals such as feral pigs also have a negative impact on the local environment.

== Bawinanga Rangers ==
The Djelk IPA is managed by the Bawinanga Rangers, previously known as the Djelk Rangers, who are a group of Indigenous rangers responsible for land management and sea management activities in the region. The Bawinanga Rangers is a community-based initiative which began in 1991. Around 30 rangers now implement cultural and natural resource management plans across the IPA.The Rangers' duties include surveillance and monitoring of fishing activities, fire and weed management, animal monitoring, water monitoring, cultural heritage management, feral animal management, a crocodile hatchery program, and removal of problem crocodiles. The Bawinanga Rangers are part of the Bawinanga Aboriginal Corporation.
