= Birriliburu Indigenous Protected Area =

Protected area in Western Australia, Australia

- IUCN category III (natural monument or feature)
- Location within Western Australia
- Nearest city: Wiluna, Western Australia
- Coordinates: 24.2851°S 124.3500°E
- Area: 5,571.99 km^{2} (2,151.36 sq mi)
- Designation: Indigenous Protected Area
- Designated: 2013

The Birriliburu Indigenous Protected Area, also known as Birriliburu IPA, is an Indigenous Protected Area (IPA) covering an area of 6,600,000 hectares (16,000,000 acres) in the Western Desert region of Western Australia, was declared in 2013.

Stretching from the nationally significant Carnarvon Range (Katjarra) to Constance Headland, along the famous Canning Stock Route, the IPA covers three central Western Desert regions: the Little Sandy Desert, Gibson Desert and the Gascoyne. The land belongs to the Birriliburu native title holders, known as the Martu people. Three native title claims, dating from 2008, 2010 and 2011, were decided in 2016.

There is a high level of biodiversity in this IPA, ranging from red sand dunes and sandstone mountain ranges to salt lakes and claypans. The area is home to a high number of nationally significant species, including the black-flanked rock-wallaby, great desert skink, night parrot and the slender-billed thornbill.

Ancient rock art sites culturally significant to the Martu exist throughout Birriliburu IPA, including Karnatukul (Serpent's Glen).

In 2014, the Birriliburu traditional owners and rangers reopened Katjarra for the month of July after it had been closed since 2008, with the hope of opening it to the public each July in the future. Permits were issued for 70 visitors, with an access fee of $100 access fee per vehicle. It was also hoped that more Aboriginal people, especially young people, would visit to reconnect with their culture.
