= Anindilyakwa Indigenous Protected Area =

Region off the coast of Northern mainland Australia

Coordinates: 13°58′S 136°35′E

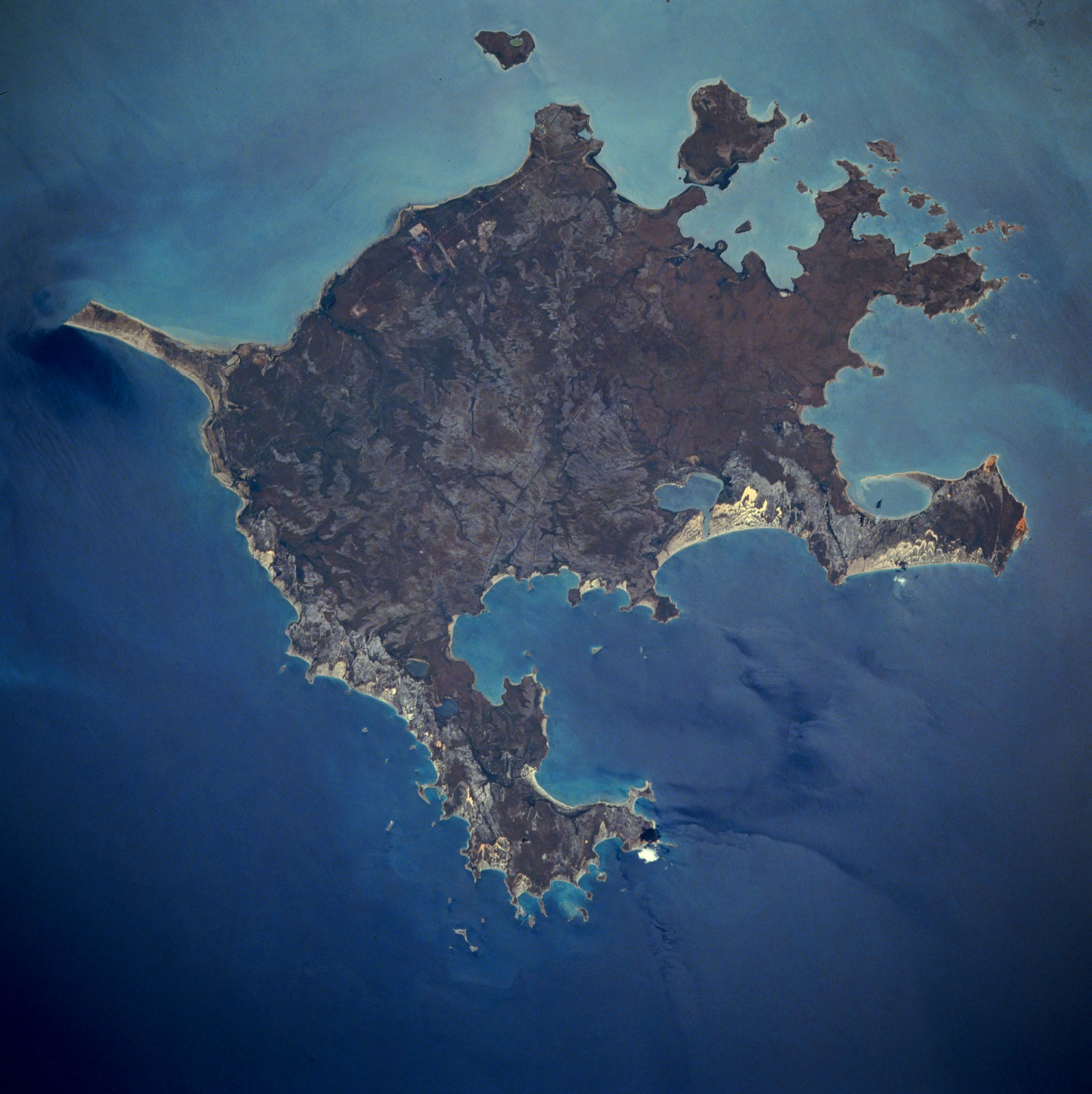
Groote Eylandt and surrounding Anindilyakwa Indigenous Protected Area

The Anindilyakwa Indigenous Protected Area (IPA) is a region off the coast of Northern mainland Australia, which includes Groote Eylandt, Bickerton Island and other islands in the archipelago, managed by Anindilyakwa people. It is located around 50 km (31 mi) opposite Blue Mud Bay on the eastern coast of Arnhem Land in the Northern Territory, about 630 kilometres (390 mi) from Darwin. It covers an area of approximately 10,000km2.

IPAs are areas of land and sea Country managed by First Nations groups for biodiversity conservation and cultural outcomes through voluntary agreements with the Australian Government. These areas for part of Australia's National Reserve System.

The Anindilyakwa Land Council (ALC) have managed the Anindilyakwa IPA since 10 June 2006 through its Anindilyakwa Land and Sea Rangers. In 2016, traditional owners extended it to include an additional 7,000 km^{2} of the surrounding "Makarda" (sea country) managing in accordance with the Anindilyakwa IPA Plan of Management 2016.

The area is pristine, with no Western agriculture and few feral species. It holds traditional songlines, sites and resources for Anindilyakwa people. It also home to over 900 plant, 150 marine, and at least 330 terrestrial vertebrate species many of which are threatened. Within it, is the only-known population of the northern hopping mouse. It is also key habitat for the northern quoll and the brush-tailed rabbit rat, as well as important breeding areas for four threatened marine turtle species.

In 2019, the ALC undertook the largest research project of its kind in partnership with the Australian Institute of Marine Science mapping 3200 km^{2 of} Groote Eylandt's deeper coastal habitats forming a baseline for future management.
