= Christmas and Cocos Islands tropical forests =

Ecoregion in Christmas Island and North Keeling Island

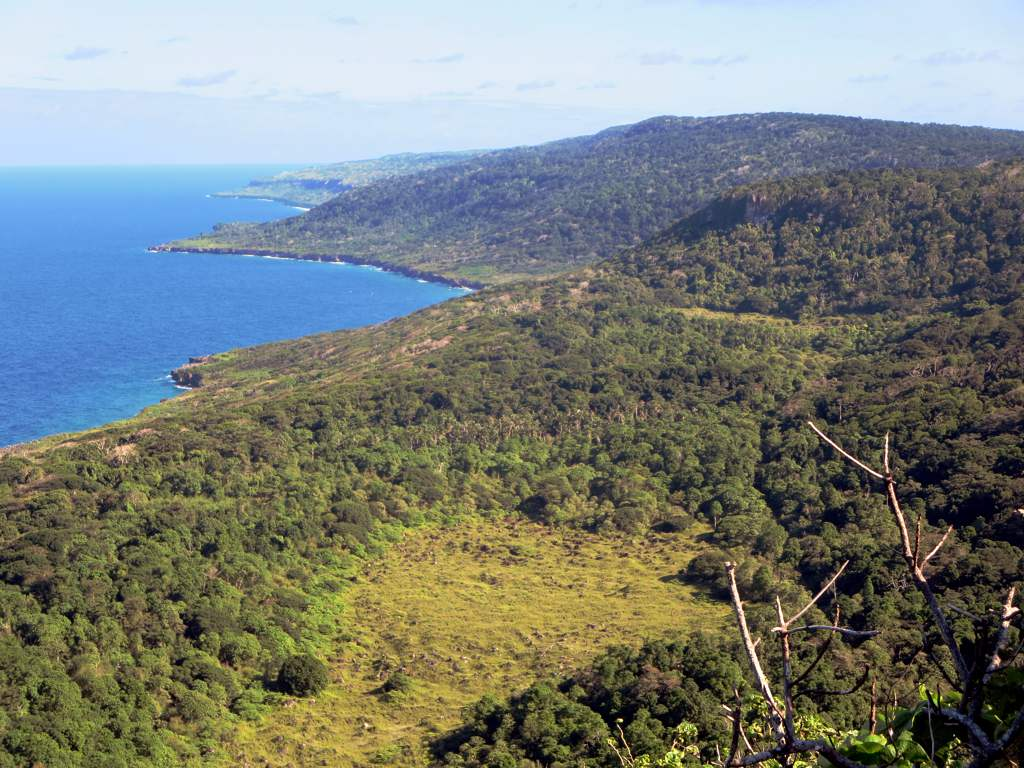
- East coast of Christmas Island

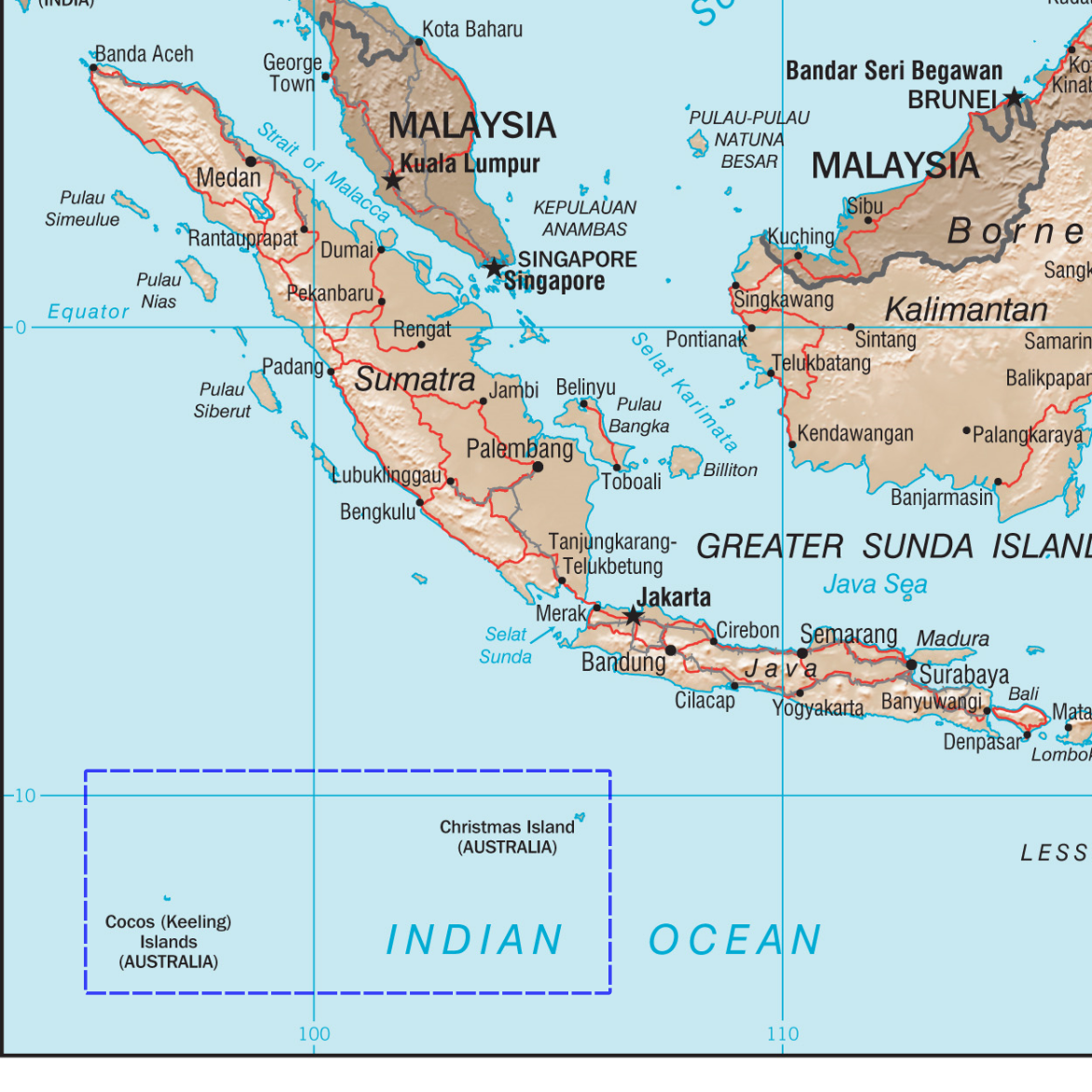
- Ecoregion territory (islands in blue dashed box)

Ecology
- Realm: Indomalayan realm
- Biome: Tropical and subtropical moist broadleaf forests

Geography
- Area: 130 km^{2} (50 mi^{2})
- Country: Australia
- Coordinates: 10.487°S 105.6°E

The Christmas and Cocos Islands tropical forests ecoregion (WWF ID: IM0110) covers forested areas of Christmas Island and North Keeling Island, two small seamount islands south of the Indonesian island of Java. The forests of these two islands share tree species of the Indo-Pacific and Melanesian types on nearby islands. The forests of Christmas Island and North Keeling Island are unique in how they reflect the effects of large populations of terrestrial red crabs (Gecarcoidea natalis). Because of the remoteness of the islands, there are many endemic species.

== Location and description ==
=== Christmas Island ===
Christmas Island, 350 km southwest of the island of Java, is mostly forested. Of its 135 km2 total area, 85 km2 is protected by the Christmas Island National Park. The island is a limestone cover of an ancient submerged volcano, with eroded terraces and an interior plateau.

=== Cocos (Keeling) Islands ===
Of the Cocos (Keeling) Islands, only North Keeling Island has significant forest, the other islands having mostly been converted to agricultural uses. North Keeling Island is 900 km southwest of Christmas Island. The Cocos Islands are also built on submerged seamounts, but the surface is limited to a low-lying coral atoll.

== Climate ==
The climate of the ecoregion is Tropical monsoon climate (Köppen climate classification (Am)). This climate is characterized by relatively even temperatures throughout the year (all months being greater than 18 °C (64 °F) average temperature), and a pronounced dry season. This climate is mid-way between a tropical rainforest and a tropical savannah. On Christmas Island, the temperatures average from 23–29 °C (73–84 °F) and an average humidity of 80-90% (Gray 1981). Precipitation averages 2,000 mm/year. The wet monsoon season is from December to April.

== Flora and fauna ==
The forests of the ecoregion have a dense canopy at 30–40 metres (98–131 ft), little undergrowth, and a wide range of epiphytes. Some trees reach 50 metres (160 ft). The characteristic tree species are Planchonella nitida, Syzygium nervosum, Tristiropsis acutangula, Inocarpus fagifer, and Hernandia ovigera. Undergrowth that exists is typically the vulnerable Lister's palm (Arenga listeri) and Pandanus elatus .

Over 100 million red crabs (Gecarcoidea natalis) are estimated to live in the woods; they keep most of the forest floor clear of fallen leaves and other litter. Christmas Island is also home to the vulnerable Christmas Island hawk-owl (Ninox natalis).

== Protected areas ==
About 9% of the ecoregion is part of an officially protected area, including:

- Christmas Island National Park
- Pulu Keeling National Park
