= Gascoyne bioregion =

Bioregion in Western Australia

Gascoyne
- Region
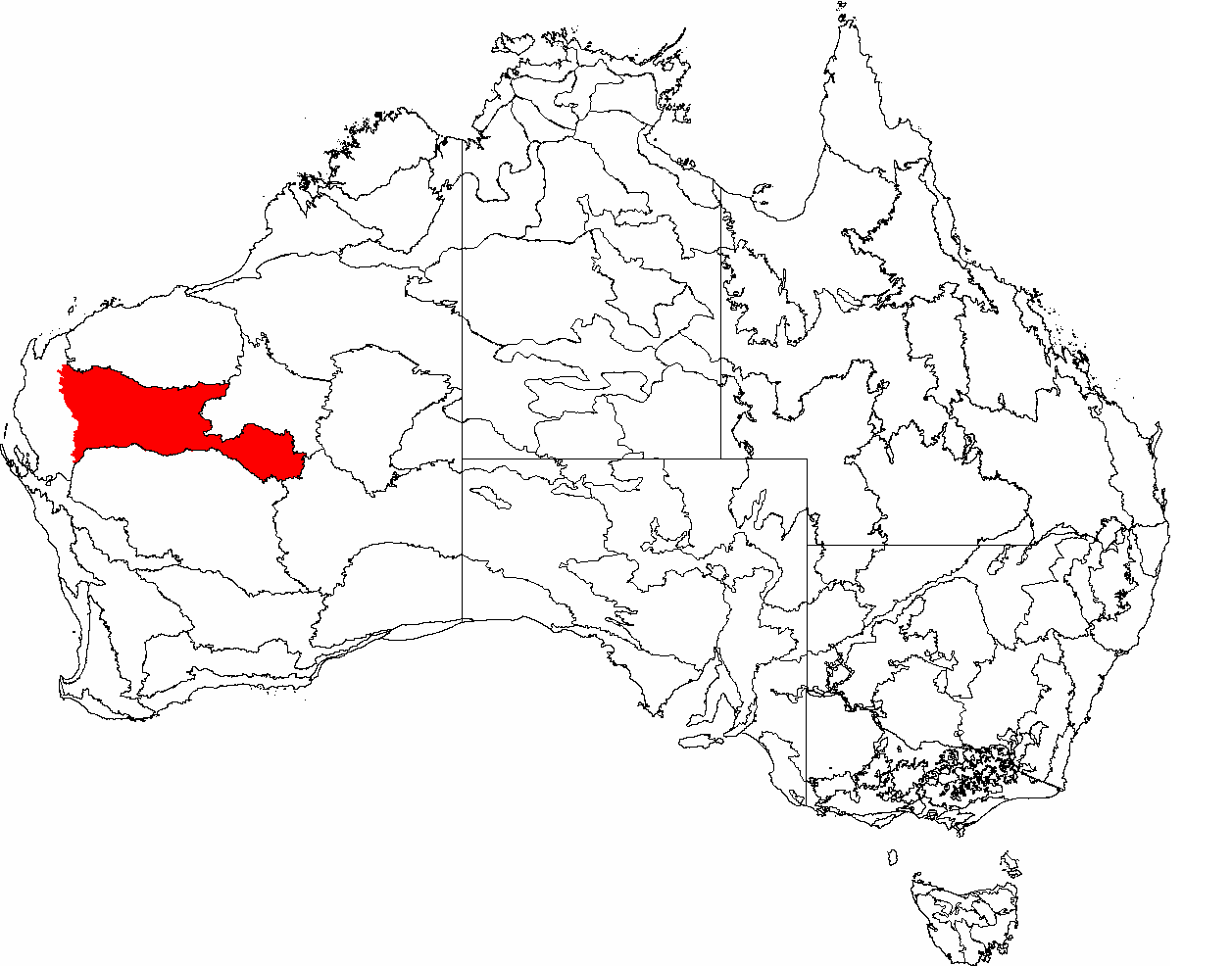
- The interim Australian bioregions, with Gascoyne in red
- Country: Australia
- State: Western Australia

Area
  - Total: 180,752.57 km^{2} (69,788.96 sq mi)
Localities around Gascoyne
Carnarvon	Pilbara	Little Sandy Desert
Carnarvon	Gascoyne	Great Victoria Desert
Murchison	Murchison	Murchison

Gascoyne is an interim Australian bioregion located in Western Australia. It has an area of 180,752.57 square kilometres (69,788.96 sq mi). Together with Murchison bioregion to the south, it constitutes the Western Australian Mulga shrublands ecoregion, as assessed by the World Wildlife Fund.

== Subregions ==
It has three subregions named after localities or areas in the region:

- Ashburton GAS01 3,687,030 hectares (9,110,800 acres)
- Carnegie GAS02 4,718,656 hectares (11,660,050 acres)
- Augustus GAS03 9,669,571 hectares (23,894,030 acres)

== Protected areas ==
Protected areas in the bioregion include:

- Barlee Range Nature Reserve
- Birriliburu Indigenous Protected Area
- Collier Range National Park
- Mount Augustus National Park
