= National Reserve System =

Network of protected areas

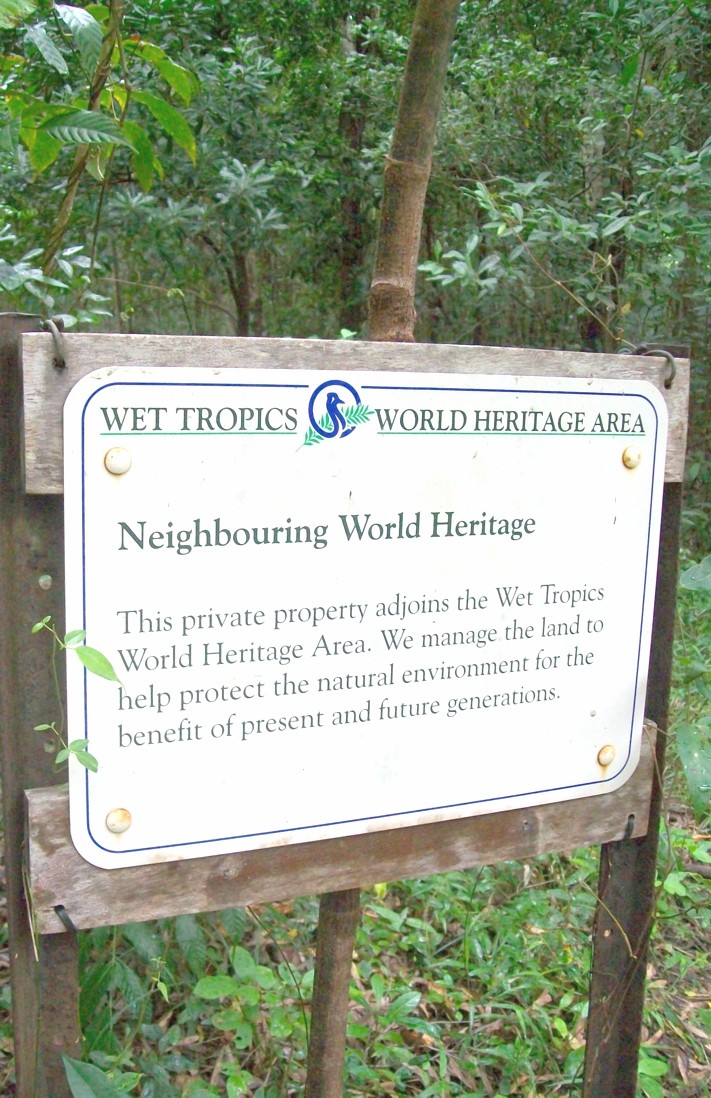
- Sample of Signage, within a Wet Tropics portion of National Reserve System
- Location: Australia
- Area: 1,370,000 km^{2} (530,000 sq mi)
- Established: 1992
- Governing body: Government of Australia; Department of the Environment
- Website: Official website

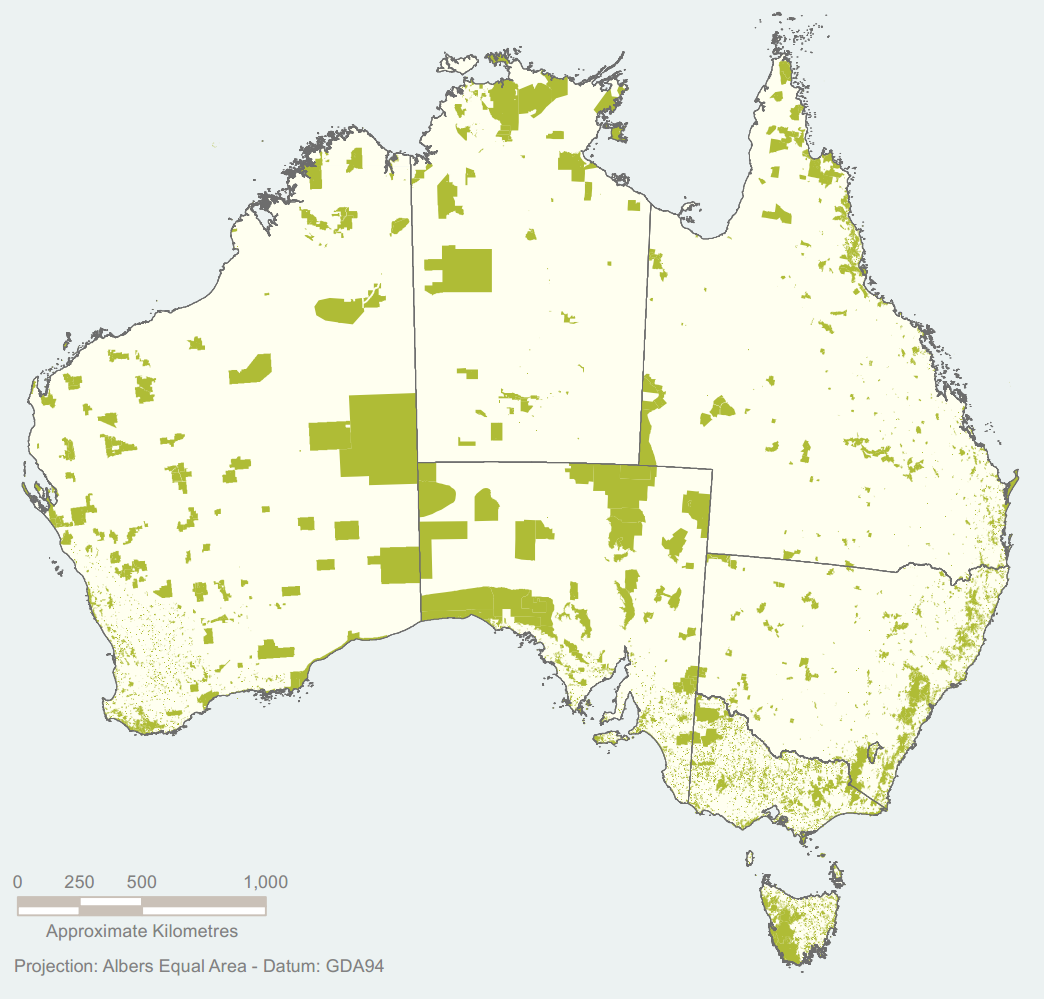
Locations of the National Reserve System in Australia (shown in green)

The National Reserve System (NRS) is a network of more than 10,000 protected areas in Australia which, in combination, on a national scale, protect more than 137 million hectares (340×10^{6} acres), more than 17% of the Australian continent, of unique biodiversity and most significant ecological landscapes for future generations. The aim of the NRS is protect the diversity of all native landscapes, flora and fauna across Australia through strategic habitat protection. It consists of public, indigenous and privately protected areas of land and inland freshwaters.

As part of the National Reserve System Cooperative Program, the Interim Biogeographic Regionalisation for Australia framework was developed as a planning tool to assist in identifying areas of priority.

== Protected areas on private lands ==
Privately protected areas consist of privately owned areas where owners have entered into "in perpetuity" covenants which are governed by the various legislative Act of the states, territories and commonwealth of Australia. Consequent to these laws, states, territories and commonwealth maintain registers of the lands and their covenants. See for example the NSW register.

== History ==
The move by the Australian Government to establish this National Reserve System was triggered by the international Convention on Biological Diversity, as part of the nation's commitment to fulfilling the objectives of that convention. In particular, after signing and ratifying the convention in 1992, Prime Minister Paul Keating announced:

The establishment of a comprehensive system of protected areas is vital if we are to retain our status as a region of megadiversity. Besides being ecologically viable these areas must represent the full range of ecosystems. The Government is committed to the development of a national comprehensive system of parks and reserves. This will be achieved in cooperation with States and Territories.

Within the first four years (1992–1996) $11.2 million was spent establishing the system and, with the cooperation and agreement of the Australian states and territories 5,600 properties (covering almost 60 million hectares (150×10^{6} acres)) were included within the system and a new Indigenous Protected Area (IPA) program was initiated to include some of the most valuable and rare ecological landscapes on Indigenous Australian owned lands. 17 IPAs were declared by 2003, which significantly added to the NRS.

Within the next ten years (1996–2007), with further substantial investment (through a National Heritage Trust) an additional 30 million hectares (74×10^{6} acres) were added to the National Reserve System, two thirds of which were IPAs. During this time, starting in 1999, Tasmania took a lead investing in partnerships to create protected areas on other private lands; and by 2005 all the states and territories re-affirmed their joint commitment to what was to be described as a national "flagship in biodiversity conservation".

The National Reserve System continues to be an Australian government priority, with continuing funding "target[ing] areas with low levels of protection, including the sub-tropical savanna from Cape York to the Kimberley, the Mitchell grass country of north-west Queensland and arid central Australia", continuing investment in IPAs, and a new National Reserve System strategy identifying priorities and actions to be taken over the next 20 years.

== Appraisal ==
The NRS has been praised by the WWF Australia as a successful, cost-effective conservation measure. CSIRO modelling has concluded that the NRS will be an important conservation tool to combat the effects of climate change in Australia on the environment.

== See also ==
- Protected areas of Australia
- Protected areas of the Australian Capital Territory
- Protected areas of New South Wales
- Protected areas of the Northern Territory
- Protected areas of Queensland
- Protected areas of South Australia
- Protected areas of Tasmania
- Protected areas of Victoria
- Protected areas of Western Australia
- Wild river § Australia
