= Chasm Island =

Island in the Gulf of Carpentaria, Australia

Native name: Burrabarra
- Location within Australia
- Etymology: named for chasms of its steep coastal cliffs

Geography
- Location: Arnhem Land
- Coordinates: 13.66°S 136.59°E
- Archipelago: Groote
- Adjacent to: Gulf of Carpentaria
- Area: 3.19 km^{2} (1.23 sq mi)
- Length: 3.0 km (1.86 mi)
- Width: 1.9 km (1.18 mi)
- Highest elevation: 79 m (259 ft)

Administration
- Australia
- Territory: Northern Territory
- Region: East Arnhem Region
- Ward: Anindilyakwa Ward/ unincorporated Alyangula
- Area covered: 3.2 km^{2} (1.2 sq mi; 100.3%)

Demographics
- Pop. density: 2/km^{2} (5/sq mi)

Additional information
- Time zone: Australian Central Standard Time (UTC+9:30)

Chasm Island (Anindilyakwa: Burrabarra or Barrubarra) is an island of the Groote archipelago in the Gulf of Carpentaria, located in the state of the Northern Territory, Australia, in the northernmost part of the continent.

Its European name was given when, after sailing around Groote Eylandt between 5 and 14 January 1803, Matthew Flinders and his accompanying scientific party landed on the small island to take bearings and found that deep chasms in the cliffs made it difficult to reach the top.

The island is significant for the millennia-old rock art found there that include paintings and engravings observed and recorded by Flinders; the first documented by Europeans.

Access to the island by tourists and other visitors is strictly limited and permissions are controlled by the Anindilyakwa Land council.

== Geography and geology ==
Chasm Island covers 3.2 square kilometres and the topography is flat but rugged, with frequently encountered deep crevices and fissures in the sandstone running roughly WSW to ENE crossed by others in a North-South orientation. The highest point of the island is 79 meters above sea level. It covers 1.9 km from north to south and 3.0 km from east to west.

Matthew Flinders observed its "close-grained sand stone [...] we found also coral, iron-stone, and quartz. In many places, quartz in almost a crystallised state was sprinkled in grains through the sand stone, and in others, the sand stone itself was partly vitrified."

The island is within the McArthur Basin formed during widespread extension and thermal subsidence, and was subsequently deformed during thrust tectonics events affecting the North Australian Craton during the Proterozoic.

== Flora ==
The island vegetation is woodland and heath. Flinders discovered "a fruit which proved to be a new species of eugenia, of the size of an apple, whose acidity of taste was agreeable; there were also many large bushes covered with nutmegs, similar to those seen at Cape Vanderlin; and in some of the chasms the ground was covered with this fruit, without our being able, for some time, to know whence it came. Several trees shot up in these chasms, thirty or forty feet high, and on considering them attentively, these were found to be the trees whence the nutmegs had fallen; thus what was a spreading bush above, became, from the necessity of air and light, a tall, slender tree, and showed the admirable power in nature to accommodate itself to local circumstances. The fruit was small, and not of an agreeable flavour; nor is it probable that it can at all come in competition with the nutmeg of the Molucca Islands: it is the Myristica insipida of Brown's Prodrom. Nov. Holl, p. 400."

== Climate ==
The savanna climate average temperature is 25 °C. The warmest month is November, at 29 °C, and the coldest is July, at 22 °C. The average rainfall is 1,184 millimetres per year. The wettest month is March, with 332 millimeters of rain, and the driest is July, with 3 millimetres.

== Population ==
The island contains fewer than 2 people per square kilometre.

== Culture ==
The accepted names for the Traditional Owners of the Groote archipelago are the Anindilyakwa people or Warnumamalya ('True People' in the Anindilyakwa language). Their traditional religious beliefs resemble those found in other parts of Arnhem Land. According to their belief system, the clans and their territories were established and sanctified during the Dreaming period (amutiyurrariya). This era of creation led to a spiritual essence known as mardayan, which still resonates today. Ancestral entities traversed the land and oceans during this creative time, shaping natural features, altering the seascape, and imbuing them with spiritual significance. This spirituality is also thought to reside within specific ritual objects, artwork, designs, songs, and certain locations in the landscape and sea. The people maintain a sense of connection to the natural world, emphasizing the relationships between humans and ancestral beings, many of which are now believed to be sea creatures. The pathways followed by these creator beings extend across the sea, leaving their mark either in the ocean itself, on the seabed, or within the formations of rocks and islands that emerge from it. Ancestral beings delineated clan estates, and one, Barabara, includes Chasm Island, an area of great importance both for this clan and for all other people living on Groote Eylandt.

In their mythology, as related to Charles Mountford in 1948, the creation of the archipelago of the Gulf, including Chasm Island, was the work of a shark ancestor. They relate how the geography of the small islands; their rocky formations, steep cliffs, and submerged rocks, were shaped in ancient times by three mythical beings: the Baler-shells known as Yukana, the dolphins called Amatuana, and the tiger-shark Bangudja. A family from the Baler-shell tribe established their camp, which now appears as a low rocky hill, on the shores of Bickerton Island. Later, they relocated northward to Chasm Island where they formed a harmonious relationship with a pair of dolphins, with whom they lead a joyful coexistence, gathering abundant marine resources and playing in the warm waters. However, their tranquility was disrupted when the Tiger-shark, Bangudja, known for his violent tendencies, entered the waters surrounding Chasm Island. He assaulted the peaceful community and a fierce confrontation culminated in the death of the Dolphin-man. This outrage left the Dolphin-woman and her Baler-shell companions deeply traumatised. The Dolphin-woman transformed herself into a lengthy boulder along the coastline, while the Baler-shell family metamorphosed into a striking column situated at the island's summit and on a cliff face on Chasm Island, a red stain resembling a tiger-shark marks the presence of Bangudja. Additionally, the lifeless form of the slain Dolphin-man has solidified into a rock structure, becoming visible at low tide.

=== Rock art ===
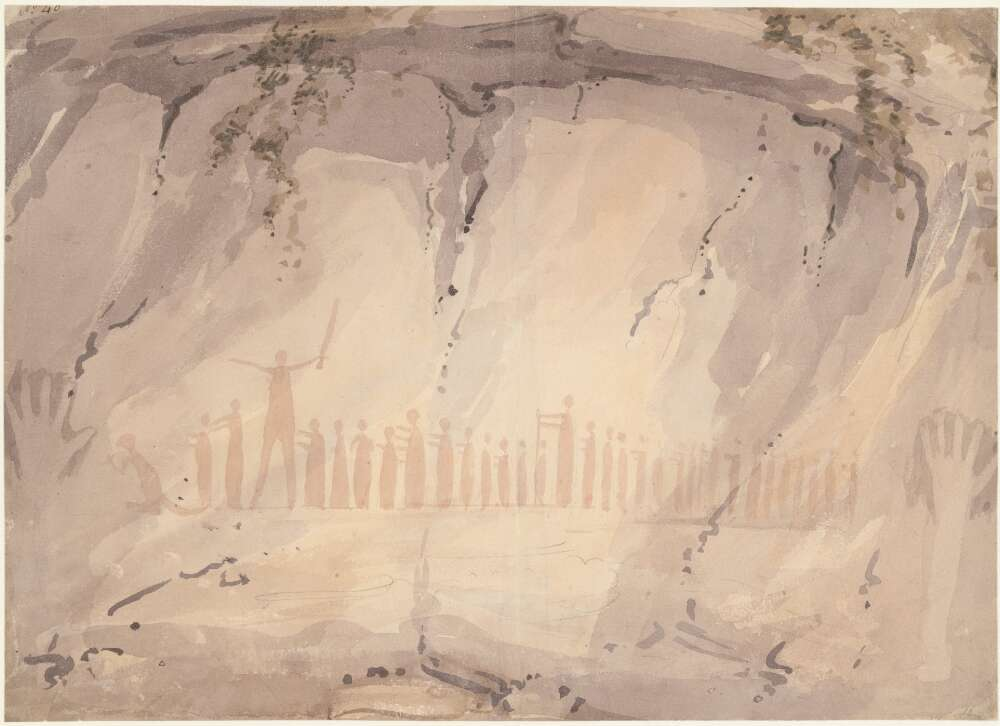
Westall, William. Chasm Island, native cave painting, 1803, watercolour. National Library of Australia

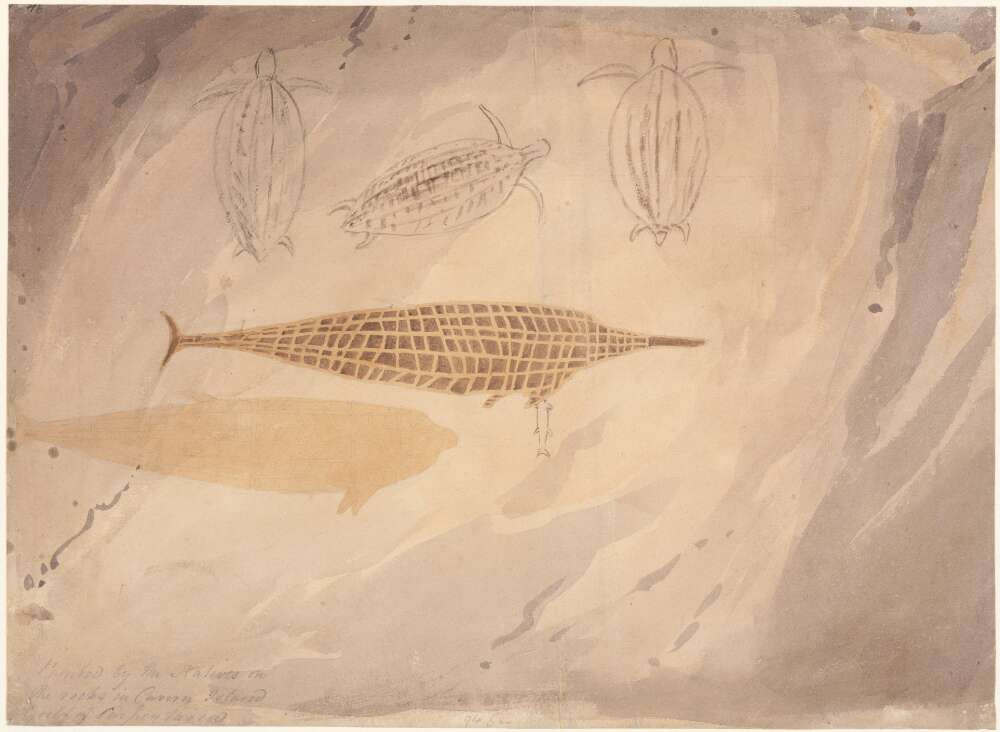
William Westall (1803) Chasm Island, native cave painting, 1803, watercolour. National Library of Australia

The first European discovery of aboriginal rock paintings took place on 14 January 1803. During a surveying expedition along the shores and islands of the Gulf of Carpentaria, British navigator and explorer Matthew Flinders made landfall on Chasm Island.

Within the island's rock shelters, Flinders discovered an array of painted and stencilled artworks. To record these images, he enlisted the ship's artist, William Westall. Westall's two watercolour sketches are the earliest known documentation of Australian rock art. In his journal, Flinders not only detailed the location and the artworks but also authored the inaugural site report:

In the deep sides of the chasms were deep holes or caverns undermining the cliffs; upon the walls of which I found rude drawings, made with charcoal and something like red paint upon the white ground of the rock. These drawings represented porpoises, turtle, kanguroos [sic], and a human hand; and Mr. Westall, who went afterwards to see them, found the representation of a kanguroo [sic], with a file of thirty-two persons following after it. The third person of the band was twice the height of the others, and held in his hand something resembling the whaddie, or wooden sword of the natives of Port Jackson; and was probably intended to represent a chief. They could not, as with us, indicate superiority by clothing or ornament, since they wore none of any kind; and therefore, with the addition of a weapon, similar to the ancients, they seem to have made superiority of person the principal emblem of superior power, of which, indeed, power is usually a consequence in the very early stages of society.

The subject matter of the paintings is mostly maritime, though includes other representations; men in canoes with spears and paddles; a man in a canoe with harpooned turtle; a canoe with one person with a steering paddle in the stern and one holding a spear-thrower in the bow; men in canoes spearing dolphin, turtles, large fish, dugong; and depictions of shoals of fish and a water goanna.

Members of the 1948 American-Australian Scientific Expedition to Arnhem Land made tracings and photographs of the rock art, Frederick McCarthy, serving as the Curator of Anthropology at the Australian Museum in Sydney, was among the duo of archaeologists engaged in the Expedition. In the early months of 1948, he dedicated a span of 14 weeks on the Groote archipelago, meticulously surveying and documenting rock art sites, as well as conducting excavation work. Collaborating with his American counterpart, Frank Setzler (Head Curator of Anthropology at the Smithsonian Institution), they scoured Groote Eylandt for sites of significance, with McCarthy meticulously recording around 2400 motifs of rock art across three pivotal complexes: Chasm Island, Angoroko, and Junduruna.

This collection of work stands as the most comprehensive documentation of the Groote archipelago rock art ever published though McCarthy was critical of Expeiditon leader Charles Mountford's editing of the expedition reports, claiming he had omitted McCarthy's analysis of Groote Eylandt and Chasm Island rock art. His thorough record-keeping of rock art allowed McCarthy to provide detailed descriptions of the motifs and to outline a framework showcasing the evolution of artistic styles over time.

McCarthy and later Chaloupka note petroglyphs also found on the island that embody the labour of countless generations of Aboriginal artists spanning thousands of years. Over this extended period, their artistic styles evolved, starting from basic outlines in the earliest stages. This progression led to a phase of linear designs before culminating in the final era characterised by pecked intaglios. Initially meticulously crafted, but over time transitioning into rougher peckings on the eroded crust of the boulders. Such shifts in engraving styles, a widespread phenomenon in prehistoric Australia, frequently coincided with notable changes in subject matter. It's likely that these transformations reflected significant shifts in religious beliefs and rituals.

McCarthy's systematic approach to in-field methodology for recording the art, coupled with his subsequent interpretations, signifies a turning point in successive rock art research within Australia. McCarthy's role in the Expedition, viewed in this context, not only contributes to the scientific comprehension of these sites in particular but also signifies the emergence of a distinct Australian discipline. The artwork documented by McCarthy, Mountford and Setzler has been the subject of further study,
