= List of indigenous ranger groups =

Indigenous ranger programs enable First Nations people across Australia to protect and manage their land, sea and culture through a combination of traditional knowledge with Western science and conservation practices.

Introduced by the Australian Government in 2007 as part of its Working on Country program, rangers are employed across Australia both in Indigenous Protected Areas (IPAs) and other parts of Australia.

== Australian Capital Territory ==
Group	Location	Associated Language Group	Foundation	Managing Organisation
Bhewerre Rangers	Bhewerre Peninsula, Jervis Bay		2020	Wreck Bay Aboriginal Community Council

== New South Wales ==
Group	Location	Associated Language Group	Foundation	Managing Organisation
Barkindji Maraura Elders Environment Team	Dareton and Wentworth	Barkindji, Maraura	2011	Self-managed
Barkandji River Rangers	Menindee	Barkandji		Barkandji Native Title Group Aboriginal Corporation
Darrunda Wajaarr Rangers	Coffs Harbour region	Gumbaynggirr	2006	Coffs Harbour and District Local Aboriginal Land Council
Gamay Rangers	Gamay		2019	La Perouse Local Aboriginal Land Council
Gayini River Rangers	Toogimbie IPA, Gayini Conservation Area, Hay	Nari Nari	2021	Nari Nari Tribal Council
Jahnala Yenbalehla Rangers	Minyumai IPA, south Evans Head	Bandjalang	2011	Minyumai Land Holding Aboriginal Corporation
Lindsay Mulcra and Wallpolla Islands River Rangers	Lindsay Mulcra and Wallpolla Islands, Murray-Sunset National Park, Mildura region		2021	First People of the Millewa-Mallee Aboriginal Corporation
Mid North Coast Indigenous Rangers	Myall Lakes National Park, Saltwater National Park, Mid North Coast Region			Taree Indigenous Development and Employment
Ngarrangarra-li Walaaybaa Walgett River Rangers	Walgett			Dharriwaa Elders Group
Ngulingah Aboriginal Rangers	Nimbin Rocks	Bundjalung		Ngulingah Local Aboriginal Land Council
Northern Gomeroi River Rangers	Boggabilla			
Wattleridge & Tarriwa Kurrukun Rangers	Wattleridge IPA, Guyra	Banbai	2001	Tamworth Local Aboriginal Land Council
Willandra Lakes Region Indigenous Rangers	Bhewerre Peninsula, Jervis Bay			Ngulingah Local Aboriginal Land Council
Worimi Green Team Rangers	Port Stephens			Woromi Local Aboriginal Land Council
Yarkuwa Indigenous River Rangers	Deniliquin			Yarkuwa

== Northern Territory ==
Group	Location	Associated Language Group	Foundation	Managing Organisation
Anangu Luritjiku Rangers	Haasts Bluff Aboriginal Land Trust, Tanami Desert	Walpiri	2010	Central Land Council
Anindilyakwa Rangers	Anindilyakwa	Anindilyakwa		Anindilyakwa Land Council
Anmatyerr Rangers	Ti Tree, Aileron	Anmatyerr	2006	Central Land Council
Arafura Swamp Ranger Groups: Balmawirrey Dhipirri Rangers, Gurruwiling Rangers, Wanga Djakamirr Rangers, Bukgurl-na Rangers Malnyangarnak and Arafura Catchment Management’s Dhupuwamirri Rangers, Donydji Rangers and Mirrngandja Rangers	Gurruwiling / Arafura Swamp IPA, Arafura Swamp and Catchment, Castlereagh Bay	Bi Ngong, Bi, Yolŋu (including speakers of the Yolŋu languages Djinang, Djinba, Djambarrpingu, Ganhalpuyngu, Mandhalpuyngu, Ritharrngu, Wagilak).	1970s, established as collective in 2013	Arafura Swamp Rangers Aboriginal Corporation
Asyrikarrak Kirim Rangers	Peppimenarti	Ngan'gimerri		Deewin Kirim Aboriginal Corporation
Bawinanga Rangers	Djelk IPA, Maningrida	Kunibídji	Early 1990s	Bawinanga Aboriginal Corporation
Bulgul Land and Sea Rangers	Delissavale Wagait Larrakia Land Trust	Kungarakan		Northern Land Council
Crocodile Islands Rangers	Crocodile Islands	Maringa		Milingimbi Outstations Progress Resource Aboriginal Corporation
Dhimurru Rangers	Dhimurru IPA, Gove Peninsula, Nhulunbuy	Yolŋu	1992	Dhimurru Aboriginal Corporation
Garawa Rangers	Ganalanga-Mindibirrina IPA, southern Gulf of Carpentaria, Robinson River/Borroloola	Waanyi, Garawa	2015	Northern Land Council
Garngi Rangers	Minjilang, Croker Island	Iwaidja, Mawng, Kunwinjku, Kuninjku	1998	Northern Land Council
Gumurr Marthakal Rangers	Marthakal IPA, Galiwin'ku, Elcho Island	Yolngu	2016	Marthakal Homelands and Resource Centre Aboriginal Corporation, Northern Land Council
Jawoyn Rangers	Katherine	Jawoyn	1997	Jawoyn Association Aboriginal Corporation
Kaltukatjara Rangers	Katiti Petermann IPA	Aṉangu	2006	Central Land Council
Li-Anthawirriyarra Sea Rangers	Southwest Gulf of Carpentaria	Yanyuwa	2011	Mabunji Aboriginal Resource Association
Malak Malak Land and Water Management Rangers	Daly River, Nauiyu Nambiyu	Malak Malak		Northern Land Council
Mangarrayi Rangers	Mangarrayi Aboriginal Land Trust, Roper River region	Mangarrayi		Jawoyn Association Aboriginal Corporation
Mardbalk Land and Sea Management Rangers	Goulburn Island, northern Arnhem Land	Maung		Northern Land Council
Mimal Rangers	Weemol	Dalabon, Rembarrnga and Mayili		Mimal Land Management Aboriginal Corporation
Muru-warinyi Ankkul Rangers	Phillip Creek Mission, Kunjarra, Jurnkurakurr	Warumungu	2003	Central Land Council
Njanjma Rangers	Warddeken IPA, Gunbalanya	Maniligarr, Mandjurrlgunj, Bunitj		Njanjma Aboriginal Corporation
North Tanami Rangers	North Tanami IPA, Tanami Desert	Walpiri	2001	Central Land Council
Numbulwar Numburindi Rangers	Numbulwar, Gulf of Carpentaria	Nunggubuyu		Northern Land Council
Thamarrurr Rangers	Thamarrurr, Wadeye	Kardu Yek Diminin	2001	Thamarrurr Development Corporation
Tiwi Rangers	Tiwi Islands	Tiwi	2006	Tiwi Land Council
Tjakura Rangers	Katiti Petermann IPA, Mutitjulu	Anangu (Pitjantjatjara, Yankunytjatjara, Luritja, Ngaanyatjarra)	2018	Central Land Council
Tjuwanpa Rangers	Ntaria	Western Aranda	2005	Tjuwanpa Outstations Resource Centre Aboriginal Corporation, Central Land Council, Parks and Wildlife Commission of the Northern Territory
Tjuwanpa Women Rangers	Ntaria	Western Aranda	2013	Tjuwanpa Outstations Resource Centre Aboriginal Corporation, Central Land Council, Parks and Wildlife Commission of the Northern Territory
Waanyi Garawa Rangers	Ganalanga-Mindibirrina IPA, southern Gulf of Carpentaria, Robinson River/Borroloola	Waanyi, Garawa	2015	Northern Land Council
Wagiman Guwardagun	Wagiman Aboriginal Land Trust, Leewin Springs, Pine Creek	Wagiman	2021	Northern Land Council
Warddeken Rangers	Warddeken IPA, Kabulwarnamyo, Manmoyi and Kamarrkawarn Outstations, west Arnhem Land	Bininj Kunwok	2009	Warddeken Land Management Limited
Warlpiri Rangers	Southern Tanami IPA, Southern Tanami	Walpiri	2002	Central Land Council
Warnbi Rangers	Kakadu National Park			Kakadu Indigenous Ranger Programme, Warnbi Aboriginal Corporation
Werenbun Rangers	Kakadu National Park			Kakadu Indigenous Ranger Programme, Warnbi Aboriginal Corporation
Yirralka Rangers	Laynhapuy IPA, north-east Arnhem Land	Yolngu	2006	Laynhapuy Homelands Aboriginal Corporation
Yugul Mangi Rangers	Roper-Gulf region, Ngukurr	Alawa, Wandarrang, Ritharrngu/Wagilag, Ngandi, Nunggubuyu, Marra, Ngalakgan, Rembarrng and Binbinga	2008	Northern Land Council

== South Australia ==
Group	Location	Associated Language Group	Foundation	Managing Organisation
Arabana Rangers	Kati Thanda	Arabana		Arabana Aboriginal Corporation RNTBC
Australian Landscapes Trust Ranger Team				Australian Landscapes Trust
Coorong and Murray Lower Lakes Area	Raukkan			Ngopamuldi Aboriginal Corporation Raukkan
Gawler Ranges Rangers	Gawler Ranges	Kokotha, Barngarla, Wirangu		Gawler Ranges Aboriginal Corporation
Nantawarrina Rangers	Nantawarrina	Adnyamathanha		Nipapanha Community Aboriginal Corporation
Ngarrindjeri Rangers	Coorong	Ngarrindjeri		Ngarrindjeri Regional Authority
Oak Valley Rangers	Maralinga Tjarutja Lands	Maralinga Tjarutja		Maralinga Tjarutja lnc, Oak Valley (Maralinga) Aboriginal Corporation
Raukkan Rangers	Coorong Lower Lakes Region	Ngarrindjeri		Aboriginal Lands Trust of South Australia
Riverland Rangers	Riverland		2022	River Murray and Mallee Aboriginal Corporation (RMMAC)
Warru Kaninytjaku APY rangers (Musgrave Ranges team and the Tomkinson Ranges team)	Musgrave Ranges	Pitjantjatjara, Yankunytjatjara		Anangu Pitjantjatjara Yankunytjatjara (APY) Land Management
Yalata Rangers	Yalata		2013	Yalata Anangu Aboriginal Corporation

== Queensland ==
Group	Location	Associated Language Group	Foundation	Managing Organisation
Apudthama Land and Sea Rangers	Northern Peninsula Area, Cape York			Northern Peninsula Area Regional Council
Bunya Mountains Murri Rangers	Bunya Mountains	Murri	2009	Bunya People's Aboriginal Corporation
Eastern Kuku Yalanji Indigenous Rangers	Eastern Kuku Yalanji IPA, Yalanji Country	Kuku Nyungkal, Jalunji-Warra	2013	Jabalbina Yalanji Aboriginal Corporation RNTBC
Erubam Rangers	Erub Island	Torres Strait Islander	2009	Torres Strait Regional Authority
Gangalidda Garawa (Burketown) Rangers	Nijinda Durlga IPA, Burketown	Gangalidda	2007	Carpentaria Land Council Aboriginal Corporation
Gidarjil Land and Sea Rangers (2 groups)	Granite Creek	Gurang		Gidarjil Development Corporation
Girringun Rangers	Girringun IPA, Rollingstone to the Djiru-Mamu boundary to Greenvale, Mount Garnet	Girringun		Girringun Aboriginal Corporation
Gunggandji Rangers	Yarrabah	Gunggandj		Gunggandji Prescribed Body Corporate Aboriginal Corporation
Kalan Rangers	Mt Croll Nature Reserve, Cape York Peninsula			Kalan Enterprises Aboriginal Corporation
Kowanyama Indigenous Rangers	Mitchell River			Kowanyama Aboriginal Shire Council
Kurtijar, Gkuthaarn, and Kukatj (Normanton) Rangers	Lower Gulf of Carpentaria, Staaten River to Leichardt River	Kukatj, Gkuthaarn, Kurtijar	2008	Carpentaria Land Council Aboriginal Corporation
Lama Lama Rangers	Lama Lama National Park	Lama Lama	2009	Yintjingga Aboriginal Corporation
lamalgal Rangers	Iama Island	Torres Strait Islander	2009	Torres Strait Regional Authority
Mabuygiw Rangers	Mabuiag Island	Mabuiag	2009	Torres Strait Regional Authority
Mandingalbay Yidinji Rangers	Mandingalbay Yidinji IPA, Trinity Inlet	Mandingalbay Yidinji		Djunbunji Limited
Malu Kiai Rangers	Boigu Island	Torres Strait Islander	2009	Torres Strait Regional Authority
Mapoon Land and Sea Rangers	Mapoon	Tjungundji	2008-09	Mapoon Aboriginal Shire Council
Masigalgal Rangers	Masig Island	Torres Strait Islander	2009	Torres Strait Regional Authority
Meriam Gesep Rangers	Mer Island	Meriam	2009	Torres Strait Regional Authority
Mua Lagalgau Rangers - Kubin	Moa Island	Torres Strait Islander	2009	Torres Strait Regional Authority
Mua Lagalgau Rangers - St Pauls	Moa Island	Torres Strait Islander	2009	Torres Strait Regional Authority
Mura Badhugal Rangers	Badu Island	Badu	2009	Torres Strait Regional Authority
Mura Buway Rangers	Saibai Island	Torres Strait Islander	2009	Torres Strait Regional Authority
Nanum Wungthim Rangers	Napranum			Napranum Aboriginal Shire Council
Porumalgal Rangers	Poruma Island	Torres Strait Islander	2009	Torres Strait Regional Authority
Simakal Rangers	Dauan Island	Dauanalgal	2009	Torres Strait Regional Authority
Quandamooka Rangers	Minjerribah, Moreton Bay	Quandamooka		Quandamooka Yoolooburrabee Aboriginal Corporation
Queensland Murray Darling Rangers	Goondiwindi, to Mitchell, Tara	Barunggam, Bidjara, Bigambul, Gunggari, Kambuwal, Kamilaroi/Goomeroi, Kooma and Mandandanji		Queensland Murray Darling Catchments Limited
Ugaram Rangers	Ugar Island	Torres Strait Islander	2009	Torres Strait Regional Authority
Warraberalgal Rangers	Warraber Island	Kulkalaig	2009	Torres Strait Regional Authority
Wellesley Islands Rangers	Thuwathu-Bujimulla IPA, Mornington Island	Lardil, Yangkaal, Kaiadilt, Gangalidda	2016	Wellesley Islands Land and Sea Social Economic Development PTY LTD
Yirrganydji Indigenous Land and Sea Rangers	Cairns to Port Douglas	Yirrganydji		Dawul Wuru Aboriginal Corporation
Yuku-Baja-Muliku Indigenous Rangers	Archer Point	Yuku-Baja-Muliku	2008	Yuku-Baja-Muliku Land Owner and Reserves Limited

== Tasmania ==
Group	Location	Associated Language Group	Foundation	Managing Organisation
milythina pakana Rangers (3 groups)				Tasmanian Aboriginal Centre
Tasmania PWS Trainees	Tasmania			Department of Primary Industries, Parks, Water and the Environment, Tasmanian Government
truwana Rangers	Cape Barren Island		2015	Tasmanian Aboriginal Centre

== Victoria ==
Group	Location	Associated Language Group	Foundation	Managing Organisation
Budj Bim Rangers	Lake Condah IPA, Budj Bim heritage areas, Macarthur			Gunditj Mirring Traditional Owners Aboriginal Corporation and Winda Mara Aboriginal Corporation

== Western Australia ==
Group	Location	Associated Language Group	Foundation	Managing Organisation
Balanggarra Rangers	Balanggarra IPA, Kimberley region	Balanggarra		Balanggarra Aboriginal Corporation RNTBC
Bardi Jawi Rangers	Bardi Jawi IPA, north Broome	Djarindjin, Lombadina, Ardyaloon		Kimberley Land Council
Blackstone Rangers	Ngaanyatjarra IPA, Papulankutja	Ngaanyatjarra		Ngaanyajtarra Council Aboriginal Corporation
Goldfields Land Management Rangers	Kalgoorlie	Wangkatja		Goldfields Land and Sea Council
Gooniyandi Rangers	Fitzroy Crossing, Kimberley region	Gooniyandi	2009	Kimberley Land Council
Jigalong Rangers	Great Sandy, Little Sandy and Gibson Deserts.	Martu		Kanyirninpa Jukurrpa
Karajarri Rangers	Karajarri IPA, southern Kimberley	Karajarri	2014	Karajarri Traditional Lands Association
Kija Rangers	Warmun (Turkey Creek), east Kimberley	Kija		Kimberley Land Council
Kiwirrkurra Rangers	Kiwirrkurra IPA, Kiwirrkurra	Pintupi, Manyjilyjarra, Kukatja		Desert Support Services
Kunawarritji Rangers	Canning Stock Route	Martu		Kanyirninpa Jukurrpa
Mid West Aboriginal Rangers (Western Mulga, DBCA and KMAC)	Shark Bay World Heritage Area, Moore River, Western Rangelands, Geraldton	Malgana, Nhanda, Amangu, Wajarri, Badimaya, Yuat		Northern Agricultural Catchments Council
Ngadju Rangers	Ngadju IPA, Nullarbor, Wheatbelt	Ngadju	2020	Ngadju Conservation Aboriginal Corporation
Nyikina Mangala Rangers	Jarlmadangah, Fitzroy River	Nyikina Mangala		Walalakoo Aboriginal Corporation RNTBC
Nyangumarta Rangers	Nyangumarta Warrarn IPA, Eighty Mile Beach	Nyangumarta	2015	Yamatji Marlpa Aboriginal Corporation
Nyul Nyul Rangers	Middle Dampier Peninsula, Beagle Bay	Nyul Nyul		Kimberley Land Council
Parnngurr Rangers (women's and men's groups)	Great Sandy, Little Sandy and Gibson Deserts.	Martu		Kanyirninpa Jukurrpa
Parnngurr Women's Rangers	Great Sandy, Little Sandy and Gibson Deserts.	Martu		Kanyirninpa Jukurrpa
Paruku Rangers	Paruku IPA, Paruku, Halls Creek	Walmajarri, Jaru, Kukatja		Kimberley Land Council
Punmu Rangers	Great Sandy, Little Sandy and Gibson Deserts.	Martu		Kanyirninpa Jukurrpa
Spinifex Rangers	Anangu Tjutaku IPA, Great Victoria Desert	Spinifex		Pila Nguru Aboriginal Corporation RNTBC
Tjaltjraak Rangers	Esperance Nyungar	Nyungar	2018	Esperance Tjaltjraak Native Title Aboriginal Corporation
Uunguu Rangers	Uunguu IPA,	Wunambal Gaambera		Wunambal Gaambera Aboriginal Corporation
Warakurna Rangers	Ngaanyatjarra IPA, Papulankutja			Ngaanyajtarra Council Aboriginal Corporation
Warburton Men Rangers	Ngaanyatjarra IPA, Papulankutja			Ngaanyajtarra Council Aboriginal Corporation
Warburton Women Rangers	Ngaanyatjarra IPA, Papulankutja			Ngaanyajtarra Council Aboriginal Corporation
Wunggurr Rangers	Wilinggin IPA, central north Kimberley	Ngarinyin	2013	Wilinggin Aboriginal Corporation
Yanunijarra Ngurrara Rangers	Warlu Jilajaa Jumu IPA, Great Sandy Desert	Ngurrara		Yanunijarra Aboriginal Corporation RNTBC
Yawoorroong Miriuwung Gajerrong Rangers	Reserve 31165, Lake Argyle	Miriuwung Gajerrong	2005	Yawoorroong Miriuwang Gajerrong Yirrgeb Noong Dawang Aboriginal Corporation
Yawuru Rangers	Yawuru IPA, Broome, The Kimberley			Nyamba Buru Yawuru Ltd
