= Angurugu, Northern Territory =

Angurugu
- Town
- Coordinates: 13°57′32″S 136°26′56″E
- Country: Australia
- State: Northern Territory
- LGA: Groote Archipelago Region

Government
  - Territory electorate: Arnhem
  - Federal division: Lingiari

Population
  - Total: 883 (SAL 2021)
- Postcode: 0822

Angurugu is a community located on Groote Eylandt in the Northern Territory, Australia. The main spoken languages are Anindilyakwa, an Australian Aboriginal language, and English. Established as a Mission for the Church Mission Society, it is one of the three main indigenous settlements on the Groote Eylandt archipelago alongside Milyakburra and Umbakumba. According to the 2021 Census, the community had a population of 883.

== History ==
=== Groote Eylandt Mission ===
Reverend Hubert Ernest de Mey Warren of the Church Mission Society (CMS), the Superintendent of the Roper River Mission, was keen to expand his operations northwards to Groote Eylandt. From 1916, he led several expeditions to the island with the purpose of establishing a new settlement to relocate the Indigenous children of mixed-race descent. The Roper Mission on the mainland had become unviable and overcrowded. Granting the CMS request, the Secretary of the Department of Home and Territories declared the whole of Groote Eylandt an Aboriginal Reserve in 1921 and gave the CMS a 21-year lease on a large portion of the island. The government granted them 200 square miles (51,800 hectares) of land on the western side of the island for the construction of a Mission.

The Groote Eylandt Mission was established in 1921 along Emerald River, 13km south of Angurugu; this is sometimes known as the Emerald River Mission.

However, it soon became apparent that the location was unsuitable for its inhabitants. The settlement had to be rebuilt numerous times due to flooding and cyclones.

In 1924, the Roper River Mission transferred 35 children to the Groote Eylandt. That number had dropped substantially by 1933. There were complaints from the Indigenous residents about the gruelling work, the state of the dormitories, the punishments meted out for infractions and the poor quality of clothing and bedding. Complaints were raised regarding the alarming cases of leprosy. A report by the Chief Medical Officer in 1934 stated that half of the adult population on the Mission had or previously had leprosy. It ceased to be a 'half-caste' mission in 1934. The CMS decided to turn their missionary activities towards the local Warnindhilyagwa people.

In 1940, a cyclone destroyed many of the older buildings at the Mission, including the boys' dormitory and severely damaged the new girls' quarters. CMS decided to move the Mission to the new site along Angurugu River.

=== Angurugu Mission ===
The Church Mission Society established the Angurugu Mission in 1943 on the southern bank of the Angurugu River. By 1947, the population of the Mission was 278. By 1956, the total number had grown to 400.

=== Groote Eylandt Mining Company ===
In 1803, Matthew Flinders had recorded the presence of minerals on the island. Geological mapping in 1960 indicated the occurrence of manganese deposits on Groote Eylandt.

The Broken Hill Proprietary Company (BHP) obtained prospecting rights in 1963 and commenced and mining operations. The 200 square miles that the CMS had leased contained 14 main deposits. The CMS took out an authority to prospect and mine on the land and negotiated a treaty with BHP for mining rights with royalties at the rate of $10,000 per annum for any production up to 100,000 tons, and a rate of 1¼% of the value of manganese ore shipped per annum more than 100,000 tons.

In 1964, the Groote Eylandt Mining Company was established and given a lease over the island for royalty payments to the Church Missionary Society. The CMS established the Groote Eylandt Aboriginal Trust Fund on 28 August 1969, where the mining company would pay the royalty money.

The population of Angurugu increased to 525 by 1971.

=== Present-day ===
Groote Eylandt became Aboriginal Freehold Land in 1976. In 2008, Angurugu became part of the East Arnhem Shire, and the Council took over local government.

In 2015, a riot broke out between two rival clans in Angurugu, involving spears and machetes. Two people were speared and later died. Six people were later tried for the violence, including one charged for murder.

== Name ==
The local Anindilyakwa people called the location chosen for the Mission along the Angurugu River "Mungwardinamanja". However, as it was difficult for the European missionaries to pronounce, the local Anindilyakwa men guiding them chose the name of the Angurugu River mouth "Angurrkwa", which was later Anglicised to Angurugu.

== Demographics ==
According to the 2021 census, the population of Angurugu and its surrounds was approximately 883. The median age of people in Angurugu is 26 years. The most common ancestries in Angurugu were Australian Aboriginal 96.6%, English 0.9%, Australian 0.8%, Fijian 0.5%, and Maori 0.3%.

=== Traditional owners ===
The traditional owners of Groote Eylandt, the Warnindhilyagwa people, have 14 clan groups, which make up the two moieties on Groote Eylandt. The clans maintain their traditions and have strong ties with the people in the community of Numbulwar and on Bickerton Island.

== Governance ==
As of 2025, the Groote Archipelago Regional Council is the local government for Angurugu, which is in the council's Central Ward.

The Anindilyakwa Land Council is the land council to the community, responsible for matters under the Aboriginal Land Rights (Northern Territory) Act 1976.

== Climate ==
Climate data for Angurugu
Month	Jan	Feb	Mar	Apr	May	Jun	Jul	Aug	Sep	Oct	Nov	Dec	Year
Record high °C (°F)	41.7 (107.1)	38.9 (102.0)	38.6 (101.5)	37.2 (99.0)	36.4 (97.5)	34.0 (93.2)	34.6 (94.3)	34.9 (94.8)	37.4 (99.3)	39.8 (103.6)	39.7 (103.5)	39.6 (103.3)	41.7 (107.1)
Mean daily maximum °C (°F)	33.1 (91.6)	32.3 (90.1)	31.9 (89.4)	31.5 (88.7)	30.2 (86.4)	28.3 (82.9)	27.6 (81.7)	29.0 (84.2)	30.9 (87.6)	32.8 (91.0)	33.9 (93.0)	33.7 (92.7)	31.3 (88.3)
Mean daily minimum °C (°F)	24.6 (76.3)	24.6 (76.3)	23.7 (74.7)	21.9 (71.4)	19.9 (67.8)	17.2 (63.0)	16.2 (61.2)	16.4 (61.5)	17.7 (63.9)	20.1 (68.2)	23.3 (73.9)	24.5 (76.1)	20.8 (69.4)
Record low °C (°F)	17.2 (63.0)	17.4 (63.3)	14.4 (57.9)	13.6 (56.5)	8.9 (48.0)	2.2 (36.0)	2.7 (36.9)	5.0 (41.0)	6.7 (44.1)	9.4 (48.9)	13.4 (56.1)	14.7 (58.5)	2.2 (36.0)
Average rainfall mm (inches)	238.1 (9.37)	249.6 (9.83)	314.7 (12.39)	152.2 (5.99)	37.6 (1.48)	8.9 (0.35)	2.2 (0.09)	1.5 (0.06)	4.5 (0.18)	31.3 (1.23)	87.0 (3.43)	158.7 (6.25)	1,287.8 (50.70)
Average rainy days (≥ 0.2mm)	14.9	14.4	16.3	9.4	4.4	2.0	0.7	0.6	1.0	2.9	6.9	10.7	84.2
