= Central Land Council =

Aboriginal land council in Australia

The Central Land Council (CLC) is a land council that represents the Aboriginal peoples of the southern half of the Northern Territory of Australia (NT), predominantly with regard to land issues. it is one of four land councils in the Northern Territory, and covers the Central Australia region. The head office is located in Alice Springs.

== History ==
The council has its origins in the struggle of Australian Aboriginal people for rights to fair wages and land. This included the strike and walk off by the Gurindji people at Wave Hill cattle station in 1966.

The Commonwealth Government of Gough Whitlam set up the Aboriginal Land Rights Commission, a Royal Commission, in February 1973 to inquire into how land rights might be achieved in the Northern Territory. Justice Woodward's first report in July 1973 recommended that a Central Land Council and a Northern Land Council be established in order to present to him the views of Aboriginal people. In response to the report of the Royal Commission a Land Rights Bill was drafted, but the Whitlam government was dismissed before it was passed.

The Aboriginal Land Rights (Northern Territory) Act 1976 (ALRA) was eventually passed by the Fraser government on 16 December 1976, and began operation on Australia Day (26 January) 1977. This Act established the basis upon which Aboriginal people in the Northern Territory could, for the first time, claim rights to land based on traditional occupation. In effect it allowed title to be transferred of most of the Aboriginal reserve lands and the opportunity to claim other land not owned, leased or being used by someone else. The passing of the ALRA also gave statutory powers and responsibilities to land councils.

== Background and description ==
The Central Land Council is one of four Land Councils in the Northern Territory. The Northern Land Council, covering the Top End, is the largest, followed by CLC, with the Tiwi Land Council, covering Bathurst and Melville Islands north of Darwin, and Anindilyakwa Land Council, covering Groote Eylandt in the Gulf of Carpentaria, much smaller entities. Until 1998, the land councils operated as statutory authorities, and they continue to operate in accordance with the Aboriginal Land Rights Act 1976 (ALRA). They are also representative bodies with responsibilities under the Native Title Act 1993.

The Central Land Council region covers 771,747 square kilometres (297,973 sq mi) of remote, rugged and often inaccessible areas. There are 18,000 Aboriginal people from 15 different Aboriginal language groups in Central Australia. The region is divided into nine regions based on these language groups.

== Aims and functions ==
Its aims include:

- Helping traditional owners lodge native title claims and helping to resolve disputes
- Consulting with landowners on mining activity, employment, development and other land use proposals
- Protecting Aboriginal culture and sacred sites
- Assisting with economic projects on Aboriginal land
- Promoting community development and improving service delivery
- Running the permit system for visitors to Aboriginal land

== Land Rights News ==
In April 1976, the CLC published the first edition of Central Australian Land Rights News, which ran until August 1984. In July 1976, the Northern Land Council (NLC) launched Land Rights News: A Newsletter for Aboriginals and Their Friends. A major goal of these newspapers was not only to provide information to Aboriginal people on land rights issues, but also to correct misinformation, provide in-depth coverage of native title issues, and to challenge the stereotypes represented in mainstream newspapers in Australia, and to encourage its readers to take action.

In September 1985 the two land councils pooled their resources to start producing Land Rights News: One Mob, One Voice, One Land (LRN).

In 1988, the newspaper won special citation in the UNAA Media Peace Awards. The judges' report said "Land Rights News serves the national Aboriginal community by keeping it informed of events and achievements and sustaining the community's spirit. It also represents a brave attempt to close the communications gap between Aboriginal and white communities. For that, it deserves special praise". At that time, the paper was under the editorship of NLC director John Ah Kit and CLC director Pat Dodson. In the same year, it won a Print Newspaper Award from the Australian Human Rights Commission.

In 2002, Aboriginal journalist Todd Condie left the Koori Mail after ten years, to work on Land Rights News.

From 2011 and as of October 2022, Land Rights News is published three times a year in two editions: "Central Australia" and "Northern Edition", and remains the longest-running Aboriginal newspaper. It is also the only printed newspaper published in Central Australia.

== Office locations ==
As of 2022 the office locations of the CLC are in the following locations (approx. north to south):

- Kalkaringi
- Lajamanu
- Tennant Creek
- Alparra
- Yuendumu
- Ti Tree
- Atitjere
- Papunya
- Alice Springs (Head Office)
- Mutitjulu

== Ranger groups ==
The Central Land Council manage the following ranger groups:

- Akityarre Rangers, Atitjere (Harts Range)
- Anangu Luritjiku Rangers, Papunya
- Anangu Rangers, Imanpa
- Anmatyerr Rangers, Ti Tree
- Aputula Rangers, Finke
- Kaltukatjara Rangers, Kaltukatjara (Docker River) – managing the Katiti Petermann IPA
- Ltyentye Apurte Rangers, Ltyentye Apurte (Santa Teresa)
- Murnkurrumurnkurru Rangers, Daguragu
- Muru-warinyi Ankkul Rangers, Tennant Creek
- North Tanami Rangers, Lajamanu
- Tjakura Rangers, Mutitjulu – managing the Katiti Petermann IPA
- Tjuwanpa Rangers, Ntaria (Hermannsburg)
- Utopia Rangers, Sandover region
- Walungurru Rangers, Kintore
- Warlpiri Rangers, Yuendumu, Nyirrpi and Willowra

== Communities and councils ==
- Arrernte Council
