= Ingura =

Ingura may refer to:

- Ingura people, an ethnic group of Australia
- Ingura language, an Australian language
- Ingura (moth), a genus of moths, now considered a synonym of Paectes
