= Anindilyakwa, Northern Territory =

Anindilyakwa Northern Territory
- Coordinates: 13°57′05″S 136°32′39″E
- Population: 375 (2021 census)
  - Density: 0.14463/km^{2} (0.3746/sq mi)
- Established: 3 April 2007
- Postcode(s): 0822
- Area: 2,592.737 km^{2} (1,001.1 sq mi)
- Time zone: ACST (UTC+9:30)
- Location: 629 km (391 mi) E of Darwin City
- LGA(s): Groote Archipelago Region
- Territory electorate(s): Arnhem
- Federal division(s): Lingiari

Anindilyakwa is a locality on Groote Eylandt, in the Northern Territory, Australia, located about 629 kilometres (391 mi) east of the territory capital of Darwin.

== History ==
The locality's boundaries and name were gazetted on 3 April 2007. It is named after the eponymous Anindilyakwa Land Council.

== Demographics ==
As of the 2021 Australian census, 375 people resided in Anindilyakwa, up from 117 in the 2016 census. The median age of persons in Anindilyakwa was 31 years. There were more males than females, with 57.6% of the population male and 42.4% female. The average household size was 3.9 people per household.

== Governance ==
As of 2024, the Groote Archipelago Regional Council is the local government for Anindilyakwa.

The Anindilyakwa Land Council is the land council to the community, responsible for matters under the Aboriginal Land Rights (Northern Territory) Act 1976.
