= Groote Eylandt =

Island off the Northern Australian coast

Native name: Ayangkidarrba
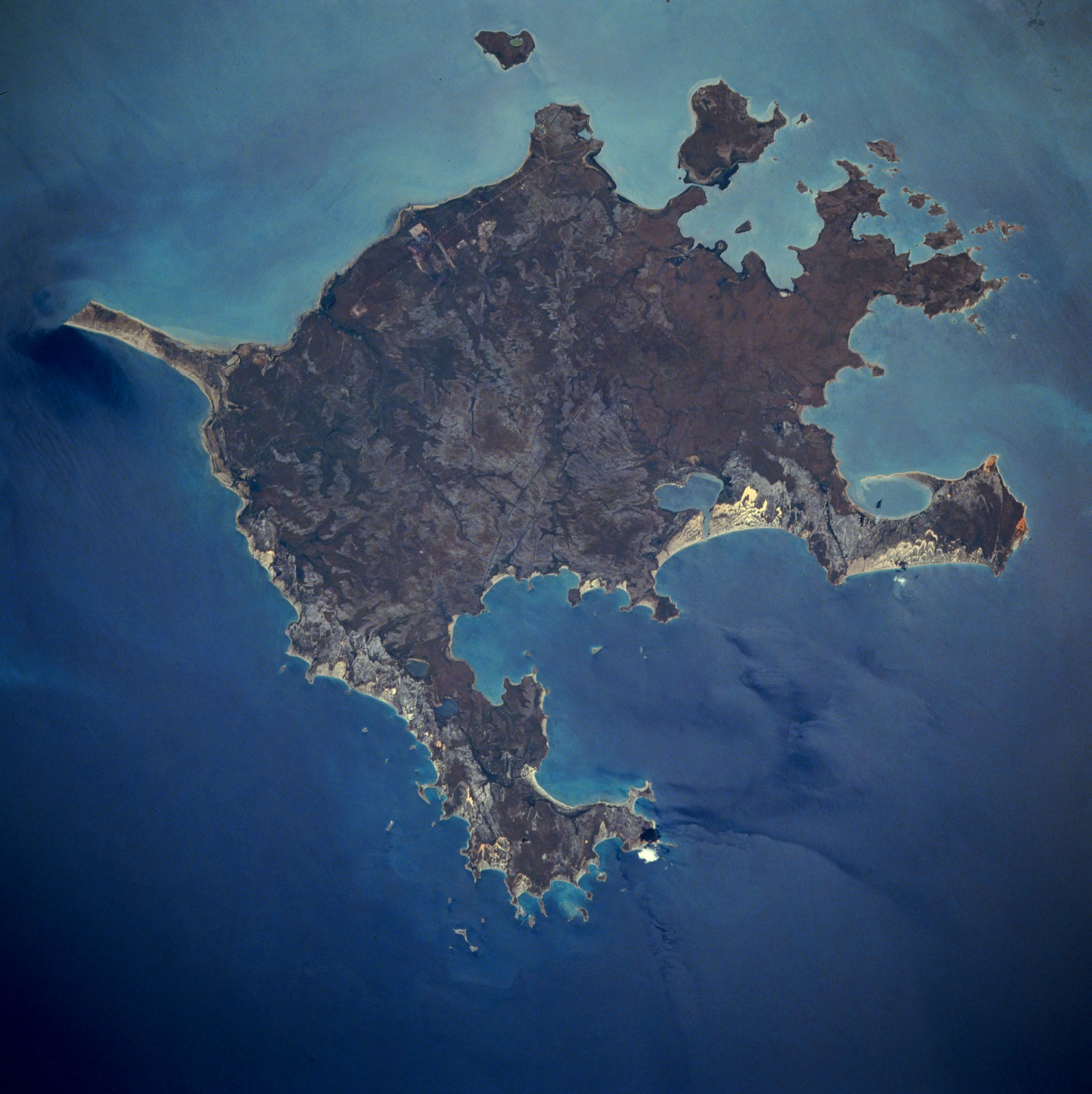
- Groote Eylandt from space, November 1989

- Location within Northern Territory Location within Australia
- Etymology: From the Dutch for "large island"

Geography
- Location: Gulf of Carpentaria
- Coordinates: 13°58′S 136°35′E
- Area: 2,326.1 km^{2} (898.1 sq mi)
- Length: 50 km (31 mi)
- Width: 60 km (37 mi)
- Highest elevation: 219 m (719 ft)
- Highest point: Central Hill

Administration
- Australia
- Territory: Northern Territory
- Region: Groote Archipelago Region
- Largest settlement: Alyangula (pop. 966)

Demographics
- Population: 2,811 (2016 census)
- Pop. density: 1.21/km^{2} (3.13/sq mi)
- Ethnic groups: Anindilyakwa/Warnindhilyagwa, European Australians

Groote Eylandt (/ˈɡruːtˌaɪlənd/ Anindilyakwa: Ayangkidarrba; meaning "island") is the largest island in the Gulf of Carpentaria and the fourth largest island in Australia. It was named by the explorer Abel Tasman in 1644 and is Dutch for "large island" in archaic spelling. The modern Dutch spelling is Groot Eiland.

The original inhabitants of Groote Eylandt are the Anindilyakwa people (also known as Warnindhilyagwa), an Aboriginal Australian people, who speak the Anindilyakwa language (also known as Amamalya Ayakwa). They consist of 14 clan groups which make up the two moieties on the island. The clans maintain their traditions and have strong ties with the people in the community of Numbulwar and on Bickerton Island. The island's population was 2,811 in the 2016 census.

There are four communities on Groote Eylandt. The mining company GEMCO established the township of Alyangula for its workers. The three main Aboriginal communities are Angurugu and Umbakumba, and Milyakburra on Bickerton Island. There are also a number of outstations on the island.

The Anindilyakwa Land Council is one of four land councils in the Northern Territory. It is a representative body with statutory authority under the Aboriginal Land Rights (Northern Territory) Act 1976 and has responsibilities under the Native Title Act 1993 and the Pastoral Land Act 1992.

== Geography ==
Groote Eylandt lies about 50 kilometres (25 nautical miles) offshore from the Northern Territory mainland (i.e. the east coast of Arnhem Land), about 630 kilometres (390 mi) from Darwin, opposite Blue Mud Bay. The island measures about 50 kilometres (31 mi) from east to west and 60 kilometres (37 mi) from north to south; its area is 2,326.1 km^{2} (898.1 sq mi). It is generally quite low-lying, with an average height above sea level of 15 metres (49 ft), although Central Hill reaches an elevation of 219 metres (719 ft).

== Politics and administration ==
=== Electorates ===
Groote Eylandt is part of the federal electorate of Lingiari, for which the current member is Marion Scrymgour, who replaced the inaugural member Warren Snowdon at the 2022 Australian federal election. The island is within the Northern Territory electoral division of Arnhem. The current member for Arnhem is Labor Party member Selena Uibo, whose mother is a Nunggubuyu and Anindilyakwa woman.

=== Local government ===
With Bickerton Island and a few smaller satellite islands, Groote Eylandt forms Anindilyakwa Ward of East Arnhem Region. It contains the communities of Angurugu, Alyangula, Umbakumba, Yadagba District, Uburamudja District and Sandy Hill (Groote Eylandt) and Milyakburra District (Bickerton Island).

Outside the local government, subdivision is the mining company GEMCO town of Alyangula, an unincorporated territory within the Northern Region of Northern Territory.

== Environment ==
The whole of Groote Eylandt and its surrounding waters lie within the Anindilyakwa Indigenous Protected Area. BirdLife International has classified an unnamed islet off the north-eastern coast as an important bird area because of its global importance as a roseate tern breeding site.

Groote Eylandt has a variety of habitats: dense stands on monsoon forests rising behind coastal sand dunes, alternating with mangrove and mudflats. Sandstone outcrops and laterite provide excellent niches for shellfish.

=== Fauna ===
The island hosts 27 species of native mammal, making it the third most mammal diverse Australian island after Melville Island and Tasmania.

=== Fishing ===
Until recently, the island had been open to the public only with permission, and the local Aboriginal Land Council did not encourage tourism. There is now a resort-style hotel on the island, and visitors are welcome. The island is becoming renowned for its fine Aboriginal rock art sites, arts and crafts and outstanding sport-fishing, including sailfish, marlin, tuna, Spanish mackerel, giant trevally, queenfish, and coral trout.

== History ==
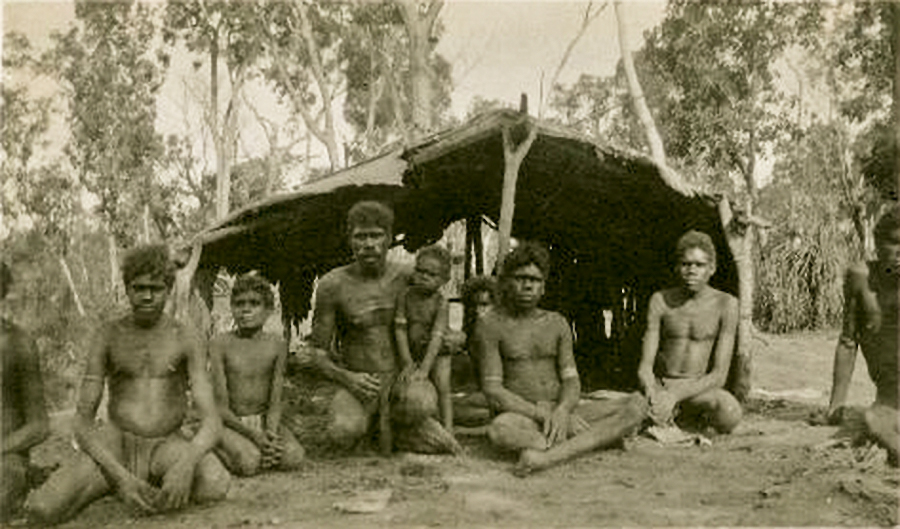
Warnindhilyagwa men and boys in a bush shelter on Groote Eylandt, 1933

=== Traditional owners ===
The traditional owners of Groote Eylandt, the Anindilyakwa people, have 14 clan groups, which make up the two moieties on Groote Eylandt. The Anindilyakwa people have inhabited the island for thousands of years. The clans maintain their traditions and have strong ties with the people in the community of Numbulwar and on Bickerton Island.

In 1856, the Jurambunga tribe, a local aboriginal conglomerate would regularly pass the island.

=== Macassan traders ===
There had been regular contact between local Aboriginal people and Macassan traders who would visit the area searching for trepang from around the early to mid-1700s. They introduced culinary delights such as tamarinds, chilli and beer. The trade continued until the Australian Government introduced the White Australia Policy in 1906.

There is still evidence of the Macassans, such as the wild tamarind trees, which the traders introduced to the area. Some Groote Eylandt settlements, such as Umbakumba, can trace their names back to Macassan origin.

=== Machado-Joseph Disease (MJD) ===
The first recorded European sighting of Groote Eylandt was in 1623, by the Dutch ship Arnhem, under Willem van Coolsteerdt. However, the relative prevalence of the hereditary Machado-Joseph Disease (MJD) in the Groote Eylandt community (a condition otherwise mainly found in the Azores) was previously suggested as evidence of early contact with Portuguese sailors. (Contact with Chinese traders has also been suggested as a cause.) Recent genetic studies showed that the Groote Eylandt families with MJD shared a haplogroup with some families from Taiwanese, Indian, and Japanese families.

=== European Colonisation ===
==== Church Mission Society ====
The first European settlement on the island was a Christian mission established by the Church Missionary Society at Emerald River in 1921. In 1943, after a cyclone swept through the mission, CMS decided to move the settlement south of the Angurugu River. The local Anindilyakwa people called the chosen location "Mungwardinamanja". However, as it was difficult for the European missionaries to pronounce, the local Anindilyakwa men guiding them chose the name of the Angurugu River mouth "Angurrkwa", which was later Anglicised to Angurugu.

==== Umbakumba ====
Mr Fred H. Gray, a pearl and trepang trader, established the Umbakumba Native Settlement on an old Macassan trading post in 1938. The place-name itself Umbakumba comes from the Malay word ombak-ombak, which means ‘lapping of waves’. He used the settlement as a base for trepanging and employed many of the Aboriginal locals during the 20s and 30s.

=== World War II ===
During World War II, in 1943, the mission moved to Angurugu, as the Royal Australian Air Force (RAAF) required the use of the mission's airstrip: the ruins of the RAAF base are still evident today. Qantas used the island as a flying boat base.

Following the Aboriginal Land Rights (Northern Territory) Act 1976, Groote Eylandt was converted to Aboriginal freehold title land. In 1979, control of the island was transferred to the local Aboriginal Town Council.

=== Manganese mining ===
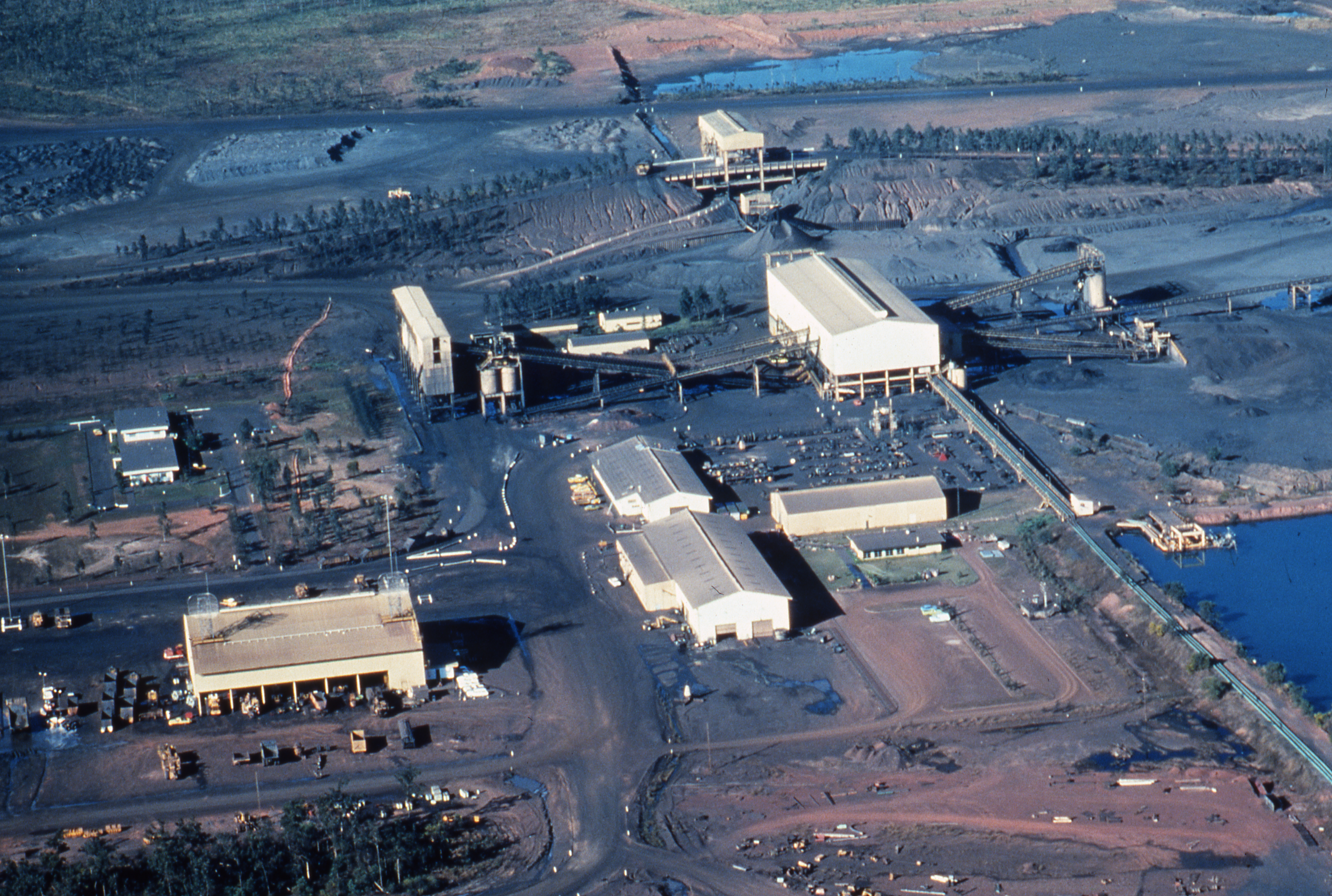
Manganese refinery at Groote Eylandt, date unknown

==== Groote Eylandt Mining Company ====
The majority of Australia's manganese reserves are located on the western side of Groote Eylandt and the deposits there comprise oolitic and pisolitic sedimentary manganese and sit within the Cretaceous Carpentaria Basin. Special mining leases were granted to the Groote Eylandt Mining Company (GEMCO) and it has been in operation since 25 July 1964 near the community of Angurugu and, as a part of its establishment, the town of Alyangula was built as a residence for mine workers in the late 1960s. GEMCO is a wholly owned subsidiary of BHP but has become a part of South32 since 18 May 2015.

The mine produces more than 3.8 million tonnes (8.4 billion pounds) annually – about a quarter of the world's total and, as of June 2023, it has produced more than 147 million tonnes (320 billion pounds) of manganese ore and concentrate.

Concerns have been raised by many community members that this mining, and the resulting dust, posed a significant risk to their health and monitoring has been in place since 2017; South32 does not dispute these readings or provide its own monitoring data. The World Health Organization advised that breathing even low levels of manganese can damage brain functions relating to dexterity and also damage respiratory and reproductive systems. To investigate the possible impacts on humans studies are being undertaken at the University of Queensland.

Sylvia Tkac, an Anindilyakwa woman, who used to work at the mine said of it:

We are worried about the future of our children, so we'd like them to do more testing and we'd like to know what positive programs they can put in place to stop this dust.

— Sylvia Tkac, as quoted in ABC News article in 2023

Studies have also taken place looking at the impacts on the ecosystem; this includes specific studies looking at the impact of northern quolls (Dasyurus hallucatus) living in the area.

Mining rights are renewed every 21 years, with operations expected to continue until at least 2027.

In March 2024 a carrier of the manganese ore, MV Anikitos, caused significant damage to the mines port during Cyclone Megan; this did not lead to a fuel leak but did, temporarily, halt production.

==== Winchelsea Mining ====
In 2019 Winchelsea Mining was granted an exploration license covering part of Winchelsea Island (Akwamburrkba), which is off the northwestern coast of Groote Eylandt. This company is a joint venture between the Anindilyakwa Advancement Aboriginal Corporation (AAAC) and AUS China International Mining and, in December 2020, they applied for a stage open cut mine plan and in 2024 they completed works on accommodation at the site.

This mine is part of a strategy to make the residents of Groote Eylandt economically independent and Anindilyakwa Land Council chair, Tony Wurramarrba, says of it:

Nobody would have thought it possible for Traditional Owners to mine their own land in an environmentally, well-managed way. But that’s what we’re going to do. It will create the wealth for us to be able to stand on our own feet.

— Tony Wurramarrba, The Story of Winchelsea and Its People, Winchelsea Mining

=== Present-day ===
On 20 May 2008, the federal government signed a deal with local Aboriginal people from Groote Eylandt to lease land to the government for 40 years. In return, the government will spend money in the community to improve housing, education, and health in the area.

== Notable people ==
- Kaye Aldenhoven, a poet who lived and taught on the island.
- Tia Gostelow (1999-), singer-songwriter who moved to Groote Eylandt as a child.
- Nick Kenny (1982–), former Brisbane Broncos rugby league player who moved to Groote Eylandt.
- Donald Thomson (1901–1970), Australian anthropologist and biologist.
- Norman Tindale (1900–1993), Australian anthropologist, archaeologist, entomologist and ethnologist.
- David Warren (1925–2010), inventor of the flight data recorder, born on Groote Eylandt.
- Emily Wurramara, singer-songwriter, born on the island.
- Helen Zahos (1977-), Nurse, paramedic, and humanitarian worker, raised on Groote Eylandt.

== See also ==
- Groote Eylandt Airport
- List of islands of Australia
