= Islet off NE Groote Eylandt Important Bird Area =

Coordinates: 13°43′03″S 136°55′25″E

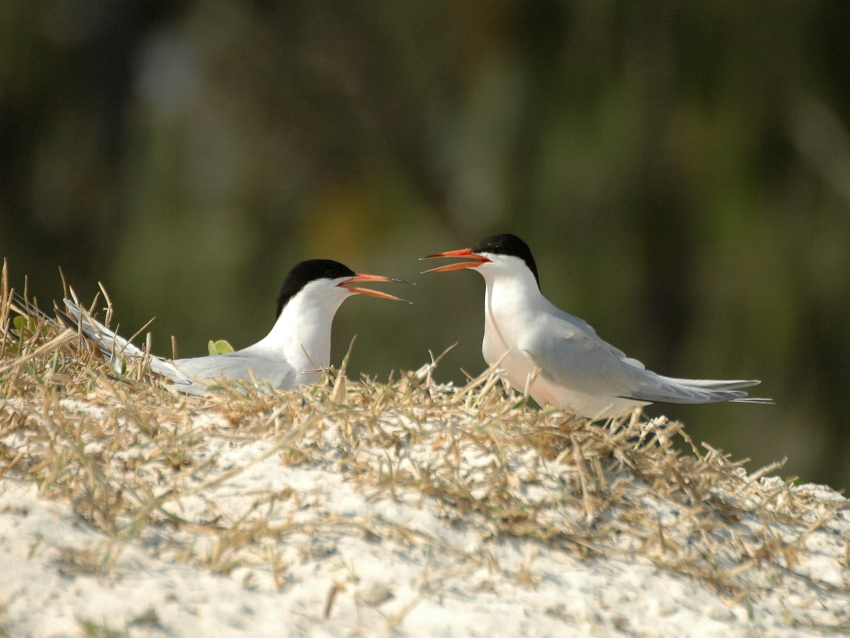
The islet is an important breeding site for roseate terns

The Islet off NE Groote Eylandt Important Bird Area comprises a small (10 ha), unnamed, sand and rock island off the north-eastern coast of Groote Eylandt in the Gulf of Carpentaria, northern Australia. It lies halfway between the north-eastern tip of Groote Eylandt and the North East Islands and is traditionally owned Aboriginal land. It has been identified by BirdLife International as an Important Bird Area (IBA) because it supports over 1% of the world population of roseate terns, with reported numbers of from 2000 to 5500 individual birds present. Up to 500 bridled terns have been recorded nesting there, as well as up to 20 black-naped terns. Marine turtles also nest on the island.
