= Anindilyakwa language =

Indigenous Australian language of the Northern Territory

Anindilyakwa
- Enindhilyakwa, Enindhilyagwa
- Amamalya Ayakwa
- Native to: Australia; Northern Territory
- Region: Groote Eylandt, Bickerton Island, Northern Territory, Australia
- Ethnicity: Warnindhilyagwa
- Native speakers: 1,500 (2021 census)
- Language family: Macro-Pama–Nyungan?: Macro-Gunwinyguan?; East Arnhem?; Anindilyakwa
- Writing system: Latin

Language codes
- ISO 639-3: aoi
- Glottolog: anin1240
- AIATSIS: N151
- ELP: Anindilyakwa
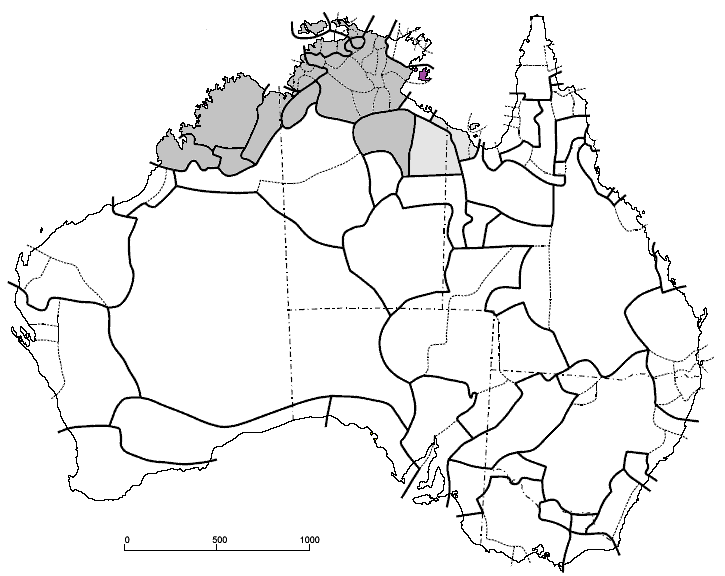
- A map highlighting Groote Eylandt and Bickerton Island, where Anindilyakwa is spoken

- Anindilyakwa is classified as Definitely Endangered by the UNESCO Atlas of the World's Languages in Danger.

Anindilyakwa (Amamalya Ayakwa) is an Australian Aboriginal language spoken by the Anindilyakwa people on Groote Eylandt and Bickerton Island in the Gulf of Carpentaria in the Northern Territory of Australia. Anindilyakwa is a multiple-classifying prefixing language in which all traditional nouns, adjectives, personal and demonstrative pronouns are prefixed for person, number and gender. According to the 2021 Australian Census, Anindilyakwa was spoken natively by 1,516 people, an increase from 1,283 in 2006.

== Names ==
The local Anindilyakwa people refer to the language as Amamalya Ayakwa (Amamalya means 'true' and Ayakwa means 'words'). However, Anindilyakwa is still commonly used.

Before a standard orthography was established, the name Anindilyakwa had been spelt in multiple ways. These included Andiljangwa, Andilyaugwa, Aninhdhilyagwa, Enindiljaugwa, Enindhilyagwa, Wanindilyaugwaz. The language was also known as Ingura, Yingguru, and Groote Eylandt after its location.

== Linguistic classification ==
Once considered a family level isolate, Van Egmond (2012) has demonstrated Anindilyakwa to be part of the Eastern branch of the Gunwinyguan family, relating it to Nunggubuyu and (more distantly) Ngandi, using correspondences between core vocabulary, verbal morphological forms, phonemes, and verbal inflectional paradigms.

== Phonology ==
=== Vowels ===
The analysis of Anindilyakwa's vowels is open to interpretation. Stokes analyses it as having 4 phonemic vowels, /i e a u/. Leeding analyses it as having just 2, /ɨ a/ with allophones [ i ɪ u ɯ ə o a ] and [ a æ aɪ æɪ e eɪ ɒ aʊ ], respectively.

=== Consonants ===
	Peripheral			Coronal			
	Bilabial	Velar		Laminal		Apical	
	Bilabial	rounded	unrounded	Palatal	Dental	Alveolar	Retroflex
Plosive	p	kʷ	k	c	t̪	t	ʈ
Nasal	m	ŋʷ	ŋ	ɲ	n̪	n	ɳ
Lateral				ʎ	l̪		(ɭ)
Rhotic						r	ɻ
Glide		w		j			

=== Phonotactics ===
Anindilyakwa words almost always end with a final vowel 'a'. Clusters of up to 3 consonants such as 'ngw' can occur within words.

== Grammar ==
=== Noun classes ===
Anindilyakwa has 5 noun classes, or genders, each marked by a prefix:

Male	human	n-
Male	non-human	y-
Female	human or non-human	d-
Inanimate	neuter	a-
Inanimate	vegetable	m-

For bound pronouns, instead of "human male" and "non-human male" classes there is a single "male" class.

All traditional Anindilyakwa nouns carry a class prefix, but some loanwords may lack them.

=== Numerals ===
The language traditionally had numerals up to 20 but since the introduction of English, English words are now used almost exclusively for numbers above 5.

Anindilyakwa uses a quinary (base-5) number system, where numbers act like adjectives and must agree with the noun class of the word they describe. For example, 'one crocodile' is dawilyaba dingarrbiya, and 'two turtles' is yambilyuma yimenda, with the number prefix matching the noun class of the noun.

'Nothing' is expressed by nara ebina, 'not any'. There is no term for '"infinity", but the concept "innumerable" can be expressed by: yinguwurramur.dinama dakwulyingarrijanga 'there are too many stars to count.'

1	Awilyaba	11	Ememberrkwa awilyaba
2	Ambilyuma	12	Ememberrkwa ambilyuma
3	Abiyakarbiya	13	Ememberrkwa abiyakarbiyia
4	Abiyarbuwa	14	Ememberrkwa abiyarbuwa
5	Amangbala	15	Amaburrkwakbala
6	Amangbala awilyaba	16	Amaburrkwakbala awilyaba
7	Amangbala ambilyuma	17	Amaburrkwakbala ambilyuma
8	Amangbala abiyakarbiya	18	Amaburrkwakbala abiyakarbiya
9	Amangbala abiyarbuwa	19	Amaburrkwakbala abiyarbuwa
10	Ememberrkwa	20	Wurrakiriyabulangwa

=== Adjectives ===
Size degrees is done in 2 grades the positive and a diminutive (warrngka), although reduplication of this word is possible for an intensifying effect.

=== Pronouns ===
==== Personal pronouns ====
Anindilyakwa features 5 grammatical numbers for pronouns: singular, feminine dual, masculine dual, trial, and plural.

The language has a clusivity distinction common in many Aboriginal Australian languages – ngakwurruwa 'inclusive we' and yirruwa 'exclusive we'. 'Inclusive we' includes explicitly the addressee (that is, 'you and I, and possibly others'). 'Exclusive we' excludes explicitly the addressee (that is, 'he/she/they and I, but not you'), regardless of who else may be involved.

		Singular	Dual		Trial	Plural
		Singular	male	female	Trial	Plural
1st person	exclusive	ngayuwa 'I'	yinuwa 'we two men or women, but not you'	yirringuwa 'we two women, but not you'	yirribukwurruwa 'we three or four people, but not you'	yirruwa 'we all, excluding you'
1st person	inclusive	-	yakuwa 'you and me'	yakuwa 'you and me'	ngarrubukwurruwa 'we three or four, including you'	ngakwurruwa 'we all, including you'
2nd person		nungkuwa 'you'	nungkwurnuwa 'you two men, or man and woman'	nungkwurruguwa 'you two women'	nungkwurrubukwurruwa 'you three or four people'	nungkwurruwa 'you, many people'
3rd person		enuwa 'he'	aburnuwa 'they two men', or 'man and woman'	aburrunguwa 'they two women'	aburrubukwurruwa 'they three or four people'	aburruwa 'they all, them'
3rd person		ngaluwa 'she'	aburnuwa 'they two men', or 'man and woman'	aburrunguwa 'they two women'	aburrubukwurruwa 'they three or four people'	aburruwa 'they all, them'

==== Possessive pronouns ====
With the exception of my, possessive pronouns in Anindilyakwa replace the -uwa suffix from the singular or plural pronouns with -langwa 'belonging to'.

English	Anindilyakwa
My	Nganyangwa
Yours (singular)	Nungkwa-langwa
Yours (plural)	Nungkwurra-langwa
Ours (exclusive)	Yirra-langwa
Ours (inclusive)	Ngakwurra-langwa
Theirs	Aburra-langwa
His	Ena-langwa
Hers	Ngala-langwa

Suffixes
Suffix	Gloss
-baba	because
-dangwa	the one that's better or best
-manja	by (beside), in, at, on, when, with (people)
-minjena	mother of child
-mubaba	because (on verbs)
-mulangwa	about, of, from (on verbs); after
-murra	from (by means of), with (by means of)
-murriya	etc., and the rest
-langwa	belonging to, from, of
-langwa-langwa	around, along
-langwiya	along, along and around, over (in the sense of travelling over an area), through
-ma	in (by means of); only, just (one); with (by means of)
-yada	for (for the purpose of), so (that), to make, used on time words
-wiya	all over, still (in sense of being the same), used on time words
-wa	to

For kinship nouns, there are 7 possessive suffixes used that distinguish between first, second and thirds, singular or plural numbers, and third person genders.

Suffixes for kinship possession
		Singular		Non-singular	
		Suffix	Example	Suffix	Example
1st person		-arrka	Nganyangwa nungwarrka 'My father'		
2nd person		-ena	Nungkwa-langwa nungwena 'Your father'		
3rd person	Male	-enikba	Ena-langwa nungenikba 'His father'	-arringba	Aburra-langwa nungarringba 'Their father'
3rd person	Female	-adukba	Ngala-langwa nungadukba 'Her father'	-arringba	Aburra-langwa nungarringba 'Their father'

== Language maintenance ==
=== Groote Eylandt Language Centre ===
The Groote Eylandt Language Centre (GELC) promotes, maintains, and preserves Anindilyakwa. They are based in Angurugu with offices in Umbakumba and Bickerton Island. It hosts a significant collection of language and cultural resources relating to the Warnindilyakwa people. The Centre undertakes language projects both large and small and offers services such as language recording and resource development, language advice and expertise, and translation.

Previously known as Groote Eylandt Linguistics, Church Mission Society ran the department until 2006. The CMS created the orthography with the Latin script to translate Bible texts into Anindilyakwa. The centre now operates under the "Preserving Culture" department of the Anindilyakwa Land Council.

GELC has compiled and published the Anindilyakwa dictionary Eningerriberra-langwa jurra "The Book about Everything", as well as producing an online dictionary, and a web app with the assistance of the Australian Literacy and Numeracy Foundation. They also run a YouTube channel with an expanding content of videos and resources in Anindilyakwa.

== Lexicon ==
=== Macassan influence ===
Makassar people from the region of Sulawesi (modern-day Indonesia) began visiting the coast of northern Australia sometime around the early to middle 1700s. This happened yearly until the introduction of the White Australia Policy in 1906. The Macassans visited Groote Eylandt for trade, particularly for highly prized trepang in the South China Sea. The Macassans also brought with them tamarinds (jamba), dugout canoes (malamukwa), tobacco (dambakwa) and beer (anija). Evan analyses that there are potentially 35 Makassarese words, mostly nouns, that have entered the Anindilyakwa language, including many place names such as Umbakumba (Malay word ombak-ombak for 'lapping of waves') and Bartalumba Bay (Macassan word batu lompoa for 'the big rock').

Words with Macassan origin
English	Makassarese	Anindilyakwa	English	Makassarese	Anindilyakwa
lapping of waves	ombak-ombak	Umbakumba	the big rock	batu lompoa	Batalumba Bay
alcohol	anisi	anija	tobacco	tambako	dambakwa
anchor	balaŋo	balangwa	horse	jarang	jarrangwa
trepang	taripaŋ	derriba	shovel spear	lamaŋ	lama
fish hook	pekaŋ	bikanga	machete	kalewaŋ	kaliwanga
tamarind	jampa	jamba	fish bait	eppaŋ	libanga
material/cloth	sombala	dumbala	knife	ladiŋ	lyelyinga
dug-out canoe	lepalepa	libaliba	coconut	kaluku	kalukwa
book	surat	jurra	boss	puŋgawa	bungawa
white person	balanda	balanda	lantern	baraccuŋ	bajananga
gun	sinapaŋ	jinaba	billycan	bassi kaleŋ	bajikala
nail	paso	baja	axe	paŋkulu	bangkilya
boat	biseaŋ	mijiyanga	rudder	gulin	kulunga
box	patti	bada	mast/sail	pallayarraŋ	baliyerra
north-west wind	bara	barra	south wind	sallataŋ	dalada
north-east wind	tuŋkara 'SE wind'	lungkurrma	north-east wind	timoro	dimburra
east wind	tuŋkara 'SE wind'	dungkwarra			

=== Questions ===
Questions
English	Anindilyakwa	English	Anindilyakwa
Where?/Where is it?	Angamba?	'Who?'	Angkaburra?
Where to?/Where are you going?	Ngambu-wa?	'Who's that?'	Angkaburra wurrangaba?
Where from?/Where did you come from?	Ngamba-langwa?	'Whose?'	Angkaburra-langwa?
Where at?/Where are you?	Nga-manja?	'Can I sit here?'	Ngambarriya-langwa?
When?	Ngambi-yada?	'How much?/How many?'	Ambarrngarna?
What is your name?	Amiyembena ekirra nungkwa-langwa?	'You good?/How are you?'	Ningkeningaba?
What?	Miyambena?	'What are you doing?'	Ningkiyamarrkinama ningkakina?
Why? (for what reason?)	Miyambena-baba?	'What are you looking at?'	Amiyembena ningkirringka nungkuwa?
Why? (for what purpose?)	Miyambena-yada?		
What with?/How? (By what means?)	Miyambena-ma/Miyambena-murra?		
What's the time?	Mamiyembena mamawura mema?		

=== Animals ===
Land Animals (Yinungungwangba-murriya)
English	Anindilyakwa	English	Anindilyakwa
Crocodile	Dingarrbiya	Wallaby, kangaroo	Yiburada
Gecko	Yibilyibilya	Dingo	Warnungwenimbaluba
Goanna	Yaraja	Frilled lizard	Dukwululuwawa
Blue-tongued lizard	Yimarndakuwaba	Turtle	Yimenda
Rock wallaby	Dilanda	Bandicoot	Yirukwujilangwa
Native-cat	Yiniyerruwena	Mice, rats	Wurrendinda
Possum	Yukungba	Sugar glider	Yelyuwarra
Echidna	Dijinungkwa	Snakes	Yingarna

Introduced animals
English	Anindilyakwa	English	Anindilyakwa
Dog	Wurrawarda	Pig	Bikibiki
Chicken	Jukwajukwa	Cat	Bujikeda
Horse	Jarrangwa	Cow	Bulukwa
Deer	Bambi	Goat	Nenukwuda

Fish (Akwalya)
English	Anindilyakwa	English	Anindilyakwa
Fish	Akwalya	Turtle	Yimenda
Shark	Mangiyuwanga	Stingray	Amaduwaya
Sawfish	Yukwurrirringdangwa	Shellfish	Adidira
Octopus	Amilyengmilyengmaka	Crab	Angwala
Dugong	Dinungkwulangwa	Dolphin	Dinginjabena
Trepang	Yungwula	Starfish	Miyalkwa
Frog	Dilyaburnda		

== In popular culture ==
=== Music ===
- Emily Wurramara is an ARIA-nominated Anindilyakwa singer and songwriter from Groote Eylandt. She writes and sings songs in both English and Anindilyakwa.
- Yilila is a band from Numbulwar. The band performs their music in Wubuy, Anindilyakwa, Maccassan language and English.
- Other noteworthy bands include Mambali from Numbulwar, Groote Eylandt Band from Angurugu and Salt Lake Band from Umbakumba.

=== Film and television ===
- The Last Wave (released in the USA as Black Rain) is a 1977 Australian mystery drama film directed by Peter Weir where a white lawyer who represents a group of Aboriginal men accused of murder. It starrs Yolngu man David Gulpilil as well as local Anindilyakwa men Nandjiwarra Amagula, Walter, Roy Bara, Cedrick Lalara, and Morris Lalara who portray the men on trial.
- Bakala is a 2017 award-winning short film written and directed by Nikolas Lachajczak and told entirely in the Anindilyakwa language. It follows the story of Anindilyakwa man, Steve 'Bakala' Wurramara, who is afflicted with Machado–Joseph disease (MJD), a hereditary neurodegenerative disorder that results in a lack of muscle control and coordination of the upper and lower extremities.
- Anija is a 2011 award-winning short film written and directed by David Hansen. It is filmed mainly in the Anindilyakwa language and follows the experiences of one family dealing with the effects of alcohol addiction. The film won Best Indigenous Resource at the Australian Teachers of Media (ATOM) Awards in 2011.
- Anindilyakwa was featured in Spread the Word, an Indigenous Australian languages show on The Disney Channel. The show featured the Anindilyakwa word Ngarrarndirrarjena which translates to 'kicking a tree to get something off of it.'

=== Commemoration ===
- In 2019 the Royal Australian Mint issued a 50 cent coin to celebrate the International Year of Indigenous Languages which features 14 different words for 'money' from Australian Indigenous languages including awarnda for Anindilyakwa. The coin was designed by Aleksandra Stokic in consultation with Indigenous language custodian groups.
