= Umbakumba, Northern Territory =

Umbakumba
- Town
- Coordinates: 13°51′38.27″S 136°48′17.06″E
- Country: Australia
- State: Northern Territory
- Region: Groote Archipelago Region

Government
  - Territory electorate: Arnhem
  - Federal division: Lingiari

Population
  - Total: 419 (SAL 2021)

Umbakumba is a community located on Groote Eylandt in the Gulf of Carpentaria, Northern Territory, Australia. The main spoken languages are Anindilyakwa, an Australian Aboriginal language, and English. There are also several Yolŋu Matha speakers. It is one of the three main settlements on the Groote Eylandt archipelago, including Milyakburra and Angurugu, where Anindilyakwa is the predominant spoken language. According to the 2016 Australian Census, the population of Umbakumba was 503, an increase from 441 in 2011.

== History ==
=== Macassan contact ===
Before European contact, Macassan sailors would visit the area searching for trepang from around the early to mid-1700s. They introduced culinary delights such as tamarinds, chilli and beer. The trade continued until the Australian Government introduced the White Australia Policy in 1906. There is still evidence of the Macassans, such as the wild tamarind trees, which the traders introduced to the area. The place-name itself Umbakumba comes from the Malay word ombak-ombak, which means ‘lapping of waves’.

=== European settlement ===
==== Frederick Harold Gray ====
Mr Fred H. Gray, a pearl and trepang trader, established the Umbakumba Native Settlement on an old Macassan trading post. He used the settlement as a base for trepanging and employed many of the indigenous locals during the 20s and 30s.

In 1938 Umbakumba became renowned as the service and refuelling base for the Qantas Empire Airways flying boats that travelled the long-haul route between Sydney, Singapore and the south of England. During WWII, this converted to a Royal Australian Air Force flying base.

The Church Mission Society, which was running the Angurugu Mission on the western side of the island, did not endorse Gray's position on the island. When CMS withdrew the support of the settlement, Gray stated that he chose to continue with the work he had begun. In May 1956, the Northern Territory Administrator sent a letter to Gray stating that it was government policy only to approve of Missions run by recognised "Christian Missionary Organisations", which would exclude "the establishment and conduct of Missions by private individuals as proprietary concerns." The government withdrew the subsidy paid to the settlement.

==== Church Mission Society ====
The Church Mission Society took over control over the settlement administration on February 17, 1958, with Keith Hart as superintendent. CMS renamed the settlement Umbakumba Mission. By mid-1959, the indigenous population had grown to 175.

The Welfare Branch of the Northern Territory government took over running the mission in 1966 due to continuing staff shortages. The population at the time was 214.

=== Present-day ===
The Welfare Branch later handed administrative control of the township to a self-governing Aboriginal Community Council in 1973. In 2008 Umbakumba became part of the East Arnhem Shire Council.

== Demographics ==
According to the 2016 Australian Census, there were 503 people in Umbakumba. Of these 49.2% were male and 50.8% were female. Aboriginal and/or Torres Strait Islander people made up 95.6% of the population. The median age of people in Umbakumba was 25 years.

=== Traditional owners ===
The Mamarika Clan are the traditional owners of Umbakumba. Groote Eylandt’s Indigenous population has 14 clan groups, which make up the two moieties on Groote Eylandt. Umbakumba is one of the three main settlements on the Groote Eylandt archipelago where Anindilyakwa is the predominant language spoken at home including Milyakburra and Angurugu. The clans maintain their traditions and have strong ties with the people in the community of Numbulwar and on Bickerton Island.
