= Helen Zahos =

Australian Humanitarian Nurse

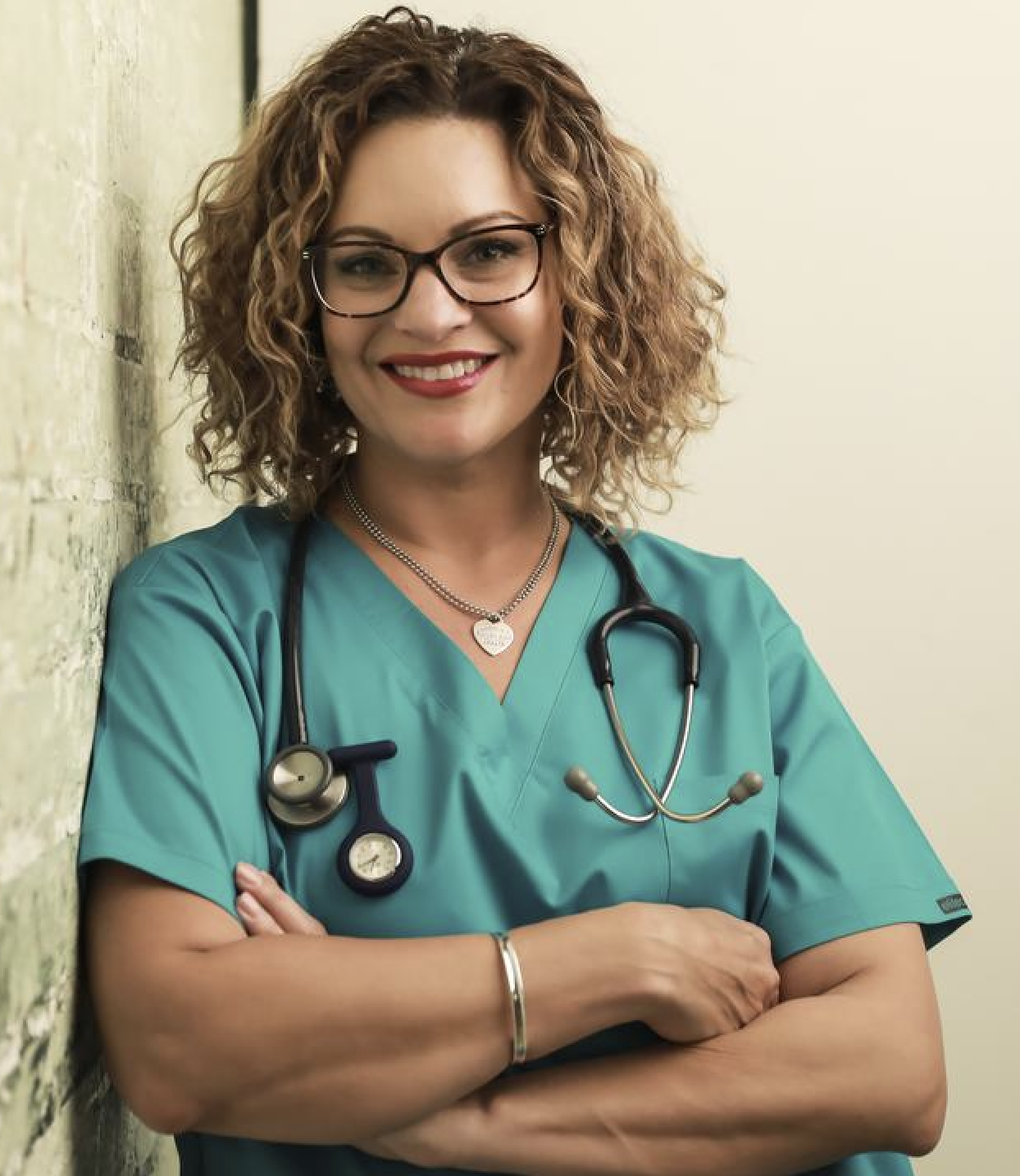
- Born: 14 April 1977 (age 49); Darwin NT (raised Groote Eylandt)
- Citizenship: Australian, Greek
- Education: Northern Territory University, Monash University
- Occupations: Registered Nurse, Humanitarian, Paramedic
- Website: https://helenzahos.com/

Helen Zahos (Greek: Ελένη Ζάχου) is a Greek and Australian nurse, paramedic, and humanitarian worker.

== Early life and education ==
Zahos was born in Darwin, Northern Territory, and grew up on Groote Eylandt. She trained in nursing and paramedicine in the Northern Territory, completing qualifications through Charles Darwin University. She is a doctoral researcher at the Monash University Accident Research Centre on the psychosocial wellbeing of Disaster Medical Assistance Teams.

== Career ==
Zahos has worked in emergency nursing and paramedicine across urban, rural, and remote settings in Australia. Her work has included service delivery in emergency departments and remote Aboriginal communities in East Arnhem Land and APY Lands.

Her volunteer humanitarian work has included disaster and conflict responses in Southeast Asia, Europe, and the Middle East. These have included responses to Typhoon Haiyan in the Philippines, the Nepal earthquake, the European migrant crisis, and the Ukraine conflict.

Zahos has contributed to research and public discussion on disaster health, Indigenous health and refugee health. She has co-authored peer-reviewed publications in public health and emergency care journals and has participated in academic and public forums addressing humanitarian health practice.

== Awards and recognition ==
In 2016, Zahos received an Excellence Award for Community Service from the Hellenic Australian Chambers of Commerce and Industry Federation. Zahos was nominated for a Pride of Australia medal for her volunteer nursing work. In 2023, she was a finalist for the QBANK Everyday Heroes Awards. In 2025, she was awarded a Special Commendation Award for Community Service at the Charles Darwin University Alumni Awards.

== Affiliations ==
She is affiliated with professional and humanitarian organisations including the Australian College of Nursing and the Royal Society of the Arts.
