= Kaye Aldenhoven =

Australian poet and teacher

Kaye Aldenhoven is an Australian poet and teacher.

== Biography ==
In 1971, Kaye Aldenhoven moved from South Australia to Umbakumba on Groote Eylandt, Northern Territory. She then lived and taught at Yuendumu, Amoonguna, Alice Springs, Darwin, Jabiru and was Principal of all three NT Area Schools (at Jabiru in Kakadu, Alyangula on Groote Eylandt and Batchelor). These moves were important for the direction of her work.

Her first book, In My Husband's Country, was a clear and deft response to country in a way that is peculiarly Territorian, as is her involvement in cross-art performances of poetry, dance ritual, and textiles. In 1992 and 2009 she won the Northern Territory Red Earth Literary Award. She has edited a number of anthologies and was included in artist's book/anthology Terra Australis edited by Chris Mansell with work by artist Tommaso Durante.

Her chapbook, Skin (PressPress, 2004) extends Aldenhoven's engagement with (and explores the conundrum of) living in country. This is an important theme in non-metropolitan Australian poetry which is not much taken up in the urbanised fringes. Poetically, Aldenhoven eschews overtly decorative language and aims for a clear and clarifying diction to illuminate her themes.

== Bibliography ==
- In My Husband's Country (2001)
- Skin (2004)
- A Story Changes Each Time It Is Told: An Anthology from the Northern Territory by Palmerston's Own Writers (2011) edited with Adele Barry
- Botanica Erotica (2012)
