= Myristica insipida var. cimicifera =

Scientific classification
- Kingdom: Plantae
- Clade: Tracheophytes
- Clade: Angiosperms
- Clade: Magnoliids
- Order: Magnoliales
- Family: Myristicaceae
- Genus: Myristica
- Species: M. insipida
- Variety: M. i. var. cimicifera

Trinomial name
- Myristica insipida var. cimicifera (Sol. ex R.Br.) Jessup

Synonyms
- Myristica cimicifera Sol. ex R.Br.; Myristica cimicifera var. typica Warb., not validly publ.; Myristica ampliata W.J.de Wilde

Species of flowering plant

Myristica insipida var. cimicifera is a variety of flowering plant in the family Myristicaceae. It is a tree endemic to Queensland, Australia.
