= GEMCO =

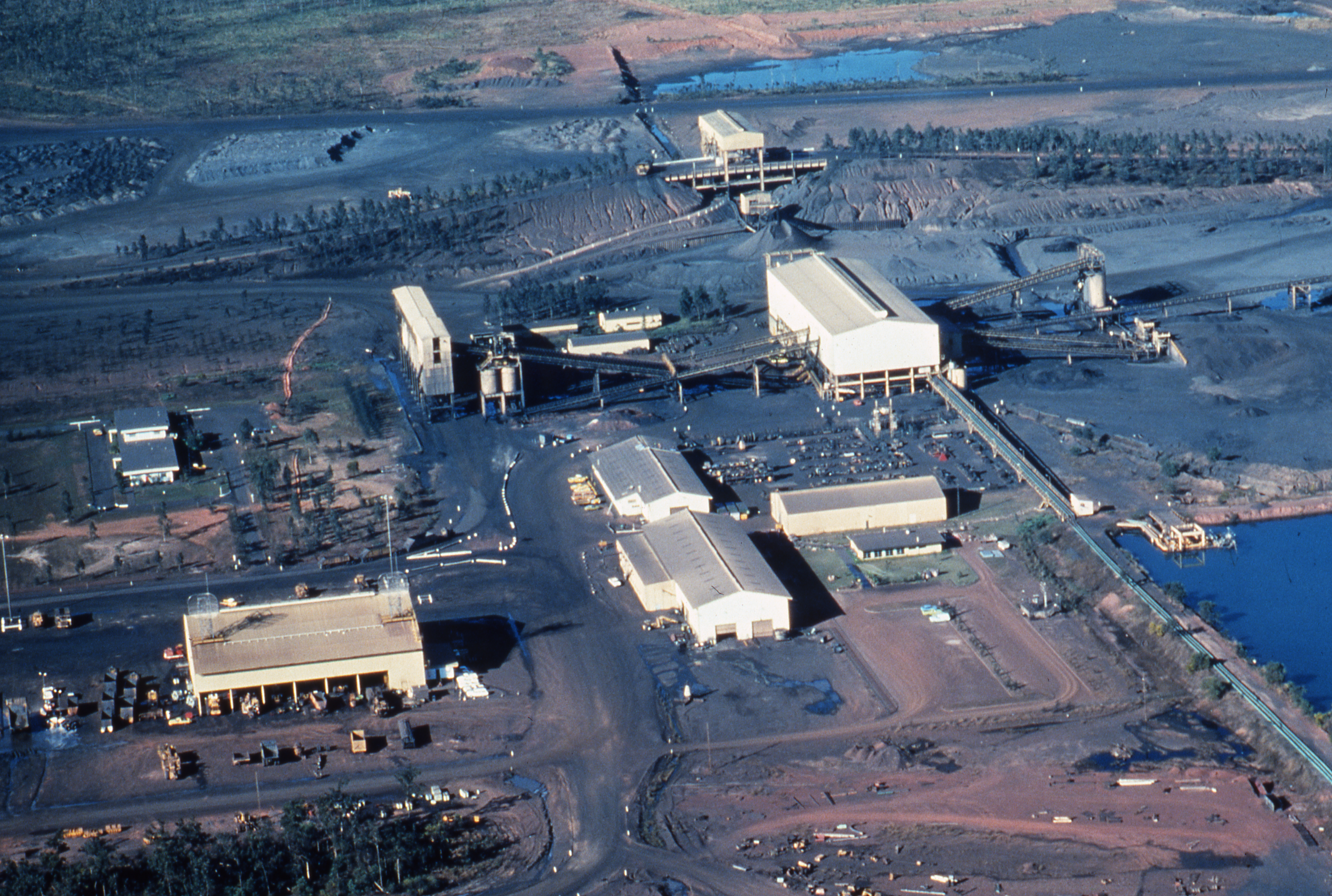
Manganese refinery at Groote Eylandt, date unknown

The Groote Eylandt Mining Company, known by its acronym GEMCO, is an Australian company that was commissioned to mine high grade manganese ore. GEMCO is majority owned by South32. It runs its operation on 84 square kilometres (32 sq. mi.) of the Arnhem Land Aboriginal Reserve, which is part of Groote Eylandt, a 2,326 square kilometre (898 sq. mi.) island in the Gulf of Carpentaria that has a population of 1539. The company is one of three manganese ore mining companies in Australia. GEMCO uses a mining extraction method called open cut strip mining. It sends its ore to be smelted at the Tasmanian Electro Metallurgical Company (TEMCO). TEMCO, established in 1965, is Australia's only ferroalloy smelter site, situated at Bell Bay, Tasmania, north of Launceston at the other end of the continent. The company extracts roughly 5 million tonnes of manganese ore every year.

In 1964, GEMCO leased land for mine from Church Missionary Society at Angurugu, Northern Territory on Groote Eylandt with royalties paid into Groote Eylandt Aboriginal Trust Fund for aborigines from 28 August 1969.
