= Myristica insipida =

Queensland nutmeg
- Leaves and fruits

Conservation status
- Least Concern (IUCN 3.1)
- Least Concern (NCA)

Scientific classification
- Kingdom: Plantae
- Clade: Tracheophytes
- Clade: Angiosperms
- Clade: Magnoliids
- Order: Magnoliales
- Family: Myristicaceae
- Genus: Myristica
- Species: M. insipida

Binomial name
- Myristica insipida R.Br.

Varieties
- Myristica insipida var. cimicifera (Sol. ex R.Br.) Jessup; Myristica insipida var. insipida

Synonyms
- For M. insipida; Myristica cimicifera var. insipida (R.Br.) Warb.; Palala insipida (R.Br.) Kuntze; For M. i. var. insipida; Myristica cimicifera var. acutifolia Warb.; Myristica macgregorii Warb.

Species of flowering plant

Myristica insipida, commonly known in Australia as Australian nutmeg, Queensland nutmeg or native nutmeg, is a small rainforest tree in the family Myristicaceae native to parts of Malesia, Papuasia and Australia. It is closely related to the commercially-important species of nutmeg, M. fragrans.

== Description ==
Myristica insipida is a small, single-stemmed tree usually growing up to 16 m (52 ft) in height but it may reach 25 m (82 ft) in certain conditions. The trunk is cylindrical and straight, in mature trees it may exceed 30 cm (12 in) DBH. The bark is dark brown with numerous fine vertical fissures. As with other members of the family, this species displays the distinctive habit known as "myristicaceous branching", in which up to five primary branches are produced in a whorl from the trunk at regular intervals (see Gallery). The branches extend horizontally from the trunk and the twigs carrying the leaves are also held in a horizontal plane, creating a layered appearance.

The exstipulate leaves are simple and alternate, dark green and glabrous (hairless) on the upper surface, much paler and glabrescent (almost glabrous) underneath, with 6 to 14 pairs of lateral or secondary veins. They are elliptic to ovate in shape, often with an acuminate tip (commonly called a "drip tip"). They are variable in size, from 2–7 cm (0.8–2.8 in) wide by 10–25 cm (3.9–9.8 in) long. The petiole, or leaf-stalk, measures between 5 and 15 mm (0.2 and 0.6 in) long and is channelled on the upper side. The lateral veins are evident on both sides of the leaf, while the reticulate (net-like) tertiary venation is only visible on the lower surface. The buds and new shoots are typically covered in very fine, dense brown hairs.

This species is dioecious, meaning that staminate (functionally male) flowers and pistillate (functionally female) flowers are produced on separate plants. The inflorescences are axillary fascicles (clusters), emanating from a small, persistent, woody tubercle in the leaf axil (see Gallery). The male flowers measure up to 6 mm (0.24 in) long by 3 mm (0.12 in) wide on a pedicel measuring up to 4 mm (0.16 in) long. Female flowers are up to 4 mm (0.16 in) long by 3 mm (0.12 in) wide on a 1–1.5 mm (0.04–0.06 in) pedicel.

The fruits which follow are a dehiscent capsule measuring between 25 and 45 mm (1.0 and 1.8 in) long by 15–25 mm (0.6–1.0 in) wide. They are ellipsoidal in shape and covered in fine, dense mid-brown hairs. The large single seed is also ellipsoidal, dark brown in colour and surrounded by a bright-red, net-like aril.

=== Phenology ===
Flowering appears to occur in response to rain events beginning in the late spring, with those at higher elevations flowering later than those at low elevations, and there may be a second flowering in a reduced number of individuals in the late summer. Male plants have been found to flower around 10–17 days earlier, and significantly longer, than female plants.

Fruits reach maturity around September, when they dehisce and reveal the seed inside. Between that time and the beginning of flowering (around 4–6 weeks) the trees put out a flush of new growth.

== Taxonomy ==
The species was first described by the Scottish botanist Robert Brown, and published in his work Prodromus Florae Novae Hollandiae et Insulae Van Diemen in 1810.

=== Infraspecies ===
There are two recognised varieties, namely Myristica insipida var. cimicifera (Sol. ex R.Br.) Jessup, and the autonym Myristica insipida var. insipida R.Br..

=== Etymology ===
The genus name Myristica was coined by Carl Linnaeus from the Ancient Greek word μυριστικός (muristikós) meaning "fragrant", and refers to the sweet-smelling oil found in some of the species. The species epithet derives from the Latin word insipidus meaning "tasteless", which is a reference to the poor quality of this species when used as a substitute for nutmeg spice.

== Distribution and habitat ==
Myristica insipida is native to the Moluccas, New Guinea, north-eastern Western Australia, northern parts of the Northern Territory, and north-eastern Queensland, where it grows in well-developed rainforest and monsoon forest at altitudes from sea level to 1,000 m (3,300 ft).

M. i. var. insipida is the only variety found in Western Australia and the Northern Territory, but both are found in Queensland.

== Ecology ==
The flowers of M. insipida, as with most plants in this family, are pollinated by a variety of species of small beetles. Fruits are eaten by cassowaries (Casuarius casuarius), musky rat-kangaroos (Hypsiprymnodon moschatus), Victoria's riflebirds (Lophorina victoriae) and various fruit doves (genus Ptilinopus).

The tree produces a useful general-purpose timber with a specific gravity of 0.56.

== Conservation ==
Under the Northern Territory's Territory Parks and Wildlife Conservation Act 1976 and Queensland's Nature Conservation Act 1992, this species is considered to be of least concern, while in Western Australia the Biodiversity Conservation Act 2016 (WA) lists it as "Not threatened". As of 9 February 2023, it has not been assessed by the IUCN.

== Gallery ==
Flowers

Leaves

Fruit
