= Indigenous ranger =

Indigenous land management program in Australia

Indigenous ranger programs enable First Nations people across Australia to protect the cultural and natural values of land and sea country at the direction of Traditional Owners. Indigenous Rangers utilise traditional ecological knowledge and partnerships with government and non-government organisations to manage country.

Introduced by the Australian Government's Environment Department in 2007, the Working on Country Program has enjoyed bipartisan support from successive governments, growing to support 127 ranger teams at 79 different Indigenous land and sea management organisations. The program provides funding to First Nations organisations to build careers in the land and sea management sector.

Many rangers deliver land and water management activities within Indigenous Protected Areas (IPAs) and other parts of Australia.

== Background and history ==
Many of Australia's threatened species and ecosystems are located on IPAs and/or in remote parts of Australia. The federal Working on Country program was established by the Howard government in 2007, with the aim of creating meaningful employment, training and career pathways for Aboriginal and Torres Strait Islander people in managing land and sea areas, as well as maintaining their cultures, and sharing their skills and knowledge with others. In turn, this would generate jobs in the environmental, biosecurity, heritage and other sectors.

The Working on Country Program was expanded and subsequently extended under the Rudd and Gillard Governments, with funding secured from 2013 to 2018.

After the Abbot Government was elected in 2013, the Working on Country and Indigenous Protected Areas (IPA) Programs were transferred from the Department of the Environment to the Department of the Prime Minister and Cabinet, along with more than 140 Aboriginal and Torres Strait Programs from different portfolio agencies.

In 2018 the Working on Country and IPA Programs was transferred to the new National Indigenous Australians Agency. An initial three year extension of funding for Working on Country (2018 to 2021), was followed by a seven year extension of the renamed Indigenous Rangers Program to 2028.

As of 2023 Working on Country had created more than 1900 full-time, part-time and casual jobs for First Nations people across the country, across 127 ranger groups.

Some Indigenous Ranger groups are supported by Country Needs People, an alliance of more than 40 Aboriginal and Torres Strait Islander organisations, The Pew Charitable Trusts, and as of 2018 more than 95,000 individuals, campaigning for the growth and security of Indigenous ranger jobs and Indigenous Protected Areas.

== Funding ==
The Australian Government has been funding Indigenous ranger groups since 2007. By 2018 the government was committing A$250 million until 2021, supporting 118 ranger groups. There had been significant advocacy for the increased annual funding for both Indigenous ranger and Indigenous Protected Area programs, the establishment of a long-term target of 5,000 ranger positions nationally, and extension of contract lengths to at least ten years for greater stability. This led to a funding increase of A$359 million, a total of $1.3 billion from 2021 to 2028 to double the number of Indigenous rangers by 2030 from 1,900 to 3,800 by 2030.

== See also ==
- List of indigenous ranger groups
- Natural Heritage Trust
