= Katiti Petermann Indigenous Protected Area =

Protected area in Northern Territory, Australia

Coordinates: 25°3′S 130°15′E

The Katiti-Petermann Indigenous Protected Area (IPA) is a 50,000 km^{2} (19,000 sq mi) area surrounding Uluru-Kata Tjuta National Park in Central Australia, managed by Anangu Traditional Owners. The region is larger than Switzerland and includes tri-border area of the Northern Territory, Western Australia and South Australia.

IPAs are areas of land and sea Country managed by First Nations groups for biodiversity conservation and cultural outcomes through voluntary agreements with the Australian Government. These areas for part of Australia's National Reserve System.

Dedicated in 2015, the Katiti Petermann IPA is managed by about a dozen of the Central Land Council's Kaltukatjara Rangers and, since 2018 the Mutijulu Tjakura Rangers as well who are predominately Pitjantjatjara and Yankunytjatjara. These language groups have inhabited this region for at least 10,000 years, or since the tukurpa, when great ancestral beings journeyed about creating landscape features.

== Geography ==
The Katit-Petermann IPA is a diverse arid area with annual precipitation of less than 300 mm. Anangu recognise three main seasons, kuli the 'hot time', nyinnga the 'cold time' and piriyakutu which is 'when the west wind blows.

It encompasses the Musgrave, Mann, Petermann and Bloods ranges. A chain of salt lakes, pantu, stretch across the northern section of the IPA including Lake Amadeus and Lake Neale.

== Flora ==
Vegetation within the IPA includes spinifex, grevillea, hakea and acacia species, as well as mulga woodlands and oak stands. River red gums are common near dry riverbeds as are chenopod shrublands and tea-tree thickets on the margins of salt lake areas.

== Fauna ==
It is also the habitat of numerous threatened species such as the tjakura (great desert skink), murtja (brush-tailed mulgara) and warru (black-footed rock wallaby).

== Ranger management ==
The two ranger groups now implement cultural and natural resource management plans across the IPA. This includes fire management, weed management particularly tackling the spread of buffel grass, species surveying and also feral animal management. This area has the highest density of feral camels in Australia, which rangers cull as part of the Australian Feral Camel Management project, to protect important water sites.
