= Alyangula, Northern Territory =

Alyangula
- Town
- Coordinates: 13°51′2″S 136°25′12″E
- Country: Australia
- State: Northern Territory
- Location: 623 km (387 mi) E of Darwin
- Established: 1960s

Government
  - Territory electorate: Arnhem
  - Federal division: Lingiari

Population
  - Total: 751 (2021 census)
- Time zone: UTC+9:30 (ACST)
- Postcode: 0885
- Mean max temp: 31.4 °C (88.5 °F)
- Mean min temp: 22.5 °C (72.5 °F)
- Annual rainfall: 1,228.5 mm (48.37 in)

Alyangula is the largest township on Groote Eylandt in the Northern Territory, Australia.

== History ==
Groote Eylandt Mining Company (GEMCO) established Alyangula as the residence for the mining company workers in the late 1960s. The township was established under a special purpose lease between GEMCO, Anindilyakwa Land Council and the Anindilyakwa Land Trust. The township of Alyangula is an unincorporated territory within the northern region of the Northern Territory.

== Climate ==
Alyangula has a tropical savanna climate (Köppen: Aw, Trewartha: Awhb/Awha), with a very hot, oppressive wet season from mid-November to April and a very warm, muggy dry season from May to mid-November, typical of the Top End region of the Northern Territory.

From May to mid-November, the prevailing winds are from the east, which due to the Great Dividing Range, cast a rain shadow throughout the Top End of the Northern Territory. Lower humidity, high winds, and lack of rain increase the likelihood of bushfires, which peak during the second half of the dry season. Typically, temperatures at day and especially night are significantly cooler than in the summer, which increases relative comfort. The record high temperature during this season was 39.2 °C (102.6 °F) on 23 October 1987, and the record low temperature was 10.5 °C (50.9 °F) on 19 July 1985.

Starting from mid-November, northwesterly winds from the Arafura Sea draw in warm, moist ocean air, which leads to monsoonal rainfall, oppressive dew points and spectacular lightning storms. Flooding, cyclones, storms and low monsoonal troughs sometimes occur during this season. Temperatures are more stable in this season, ranging from 40.3 °C (104.5 °F) on 31 December 1990 to 16.0 °C (60.8 °F) on 15 April 1994. However, temperatures above 35 °C (95 °F) or below 20 °C (68 °F) are rare during this season.

Climate data for Alyangula (13º51'S, 136º25'E, 20 m AMSL) (1970-2012 normals and extremes)
Month	Jan	Feb	Mar	Apr	May	Jun	Jul	Aug	Sep	Oct	Nov	Dec	Year
Record high °C (°F)	37.6 (99.7)	38.8 (101.8)	37.4 (99.3)	35.6 (96.1)	34.7 (94.5)	33.0 (91.4)	32.5 (90.5)	33.6 (92.5)	36.5 (97.7)	39.2 (102.6)	38.4 (101.1)	40.3 (104.5)	40.3 (104.5)
Mean daily maximum °C (°F)	33.0 (91.4)	32.4 (90.3)	32.1 (89.8)	31.7 (89.1)	30.6 (87.1)	28.5 (83.3)	28.0 (82.4)	28.9 (84.0)	31.1 (88.0)	32.8 (91.0)	33.9 (93.0)	33.8 (92.8)	31.4 (88.5)
Mean daily minimum °C (°F)	25.8 (78.4)	25.6 (78.1)	24.6 (76.3)	23.0 (73.4)	21.2 (70.2)	18.8 (65.8)	17.8 (64.0)	18.1 (64.6)	20.4 (68.7)	23.3 (73.9)	25.5 (77.9)	26.2 (79.2)	22.5 (72.5)
Record low °C (°F)	18.5 (65.3)	20.5 (68.9)	20.6 (69.1)	16.0 (60.8)	14.4 (57.9)	11.1 (52.0)	10.5 (50.9)	11.2 (52.2)	14.0 (57.2)	17.0 (62.6)	19.0 (66.2)	21.3 (70.3)	10.5 (50.9)
Average precipitation mm (inches)	220.1 (8.67)	235.5 (9.27)	266.2 (10.48)	190.9 (7.52)	33.8 (1.33)	9.4 (0.37)	4.0 (0.16)	1.7 (0.07)	3.9 (0.15)	25.6 (1.01)	58.5 (2.30)	169.8 (6.69)	1,228.4 (48.36)
Average precipitation days (≥ 1.0 mm)	11.0	12.3	13.4	10.2	4.0	1.2	0.6	0.4	0.6	2.3	4.1	7.8	67.9
Average afternoon relative humidity (%)	67	71	72	68	62	59	61	56	56	56	57	62	62
Average dew point °C (°F)	24.1 (75.4)	24.5 (76.1)	24.1 (75.4)	22.8 (73.0)	20.8 (69.4)	18.3 (64.9)	17.9 (64.2)	17.4 (63.3)	19.4 (66.9)	21.2 (70.2)	22.3 (72.1)	23.5 (74.3)	21.4 (70.4)
Source: Bureau of Meteorology

== Present day ==
In the 2021 census, the township recorded a population of 751 people who are employees of GEMCO and are almost exclusively non-Indigenous (Aboriginal and Torres Strait Islander people made up 5.5% of the population). The township comprises a first-class resort and four clubs; an arts centre; a coffee shop; a golf course and other sporting facilities; a 25m swimming pool; a church; half a dozen shops; a bank; a post office and a travel agency. The township also has a school (up to and including Year 11); a child care centre; a training centre; an area health centre; and a court house and police station. The town also has the cheapest fuel in Australia subsidised by the mine (August 2020 - unleaded fuel is 102.0cpl).
