= Anindilyakwa people =

Ethnic group of Australia's Northern Territory

Anindilyakwa
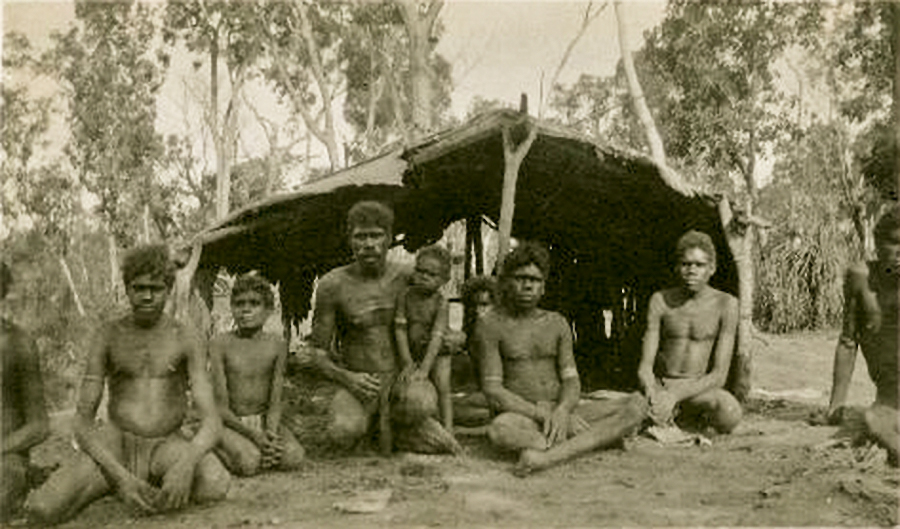
- Anindilyakwa men and boys in a bush shelter in Groote Eylandt, 1933

Total population
- 1,596 (2016)

Regions with significant populations
- Australia; Northern Territory

Languages
- Anindilyakwa language (written in various ways), Australian English, Australian Aboriginal English

The Anindilyakwa people, also known as Warnumamalya or Warnindhilyagwa, are an Aboriginal Australian people living on Groote Eylandt, Bickerton Island, and Woodah Island in the Gulf of Carpentaria in the Northern Territory of Australia.

== Names ==
The accepted names for the Traditional Owners of the Groote archipelago are the Anindilyakwa people or Warnumamalya ("True People" in the Anindilyakwa language), also spelt "Warnindhilyagwa".

Although they have a strong sense of identity, the fourteen clans on Groote Eylandt and the surrounding islands did not have a collective name that they referred to themselves. They have been called the Warnindilyakwa in the past. However, this term refers to a specific clan from the Dilyakburra peninsula on the southeastern part of the island. Anthropologist Norman Tindale previously used Ingura, the Nunggubuyu word for Groote Eylandt people.

== History ==
=== Macassan traders ===
Macassans from Sulawesi traded with the Anindilyakwa people long before the arrival of Europeans. Each December, taking advantage of the monsoonal winds, the Macassans would sail down in praus to trade for native trepang, beeswax, ironwood and pearls, which they brought back to supply the southern Chinese market, where, in particular, trepang was highly sought after as a delicacy. In exchange, they provided beads, metal, canoe technologies, sails, ceramics, earthenware pots and fishing hooks.

The trade network was extensive. On his 1803 voyage mapping Australia's coastline, Matthew Flinders came across one expedition, led by a Macassan naval chief named Pobasso, involving some 1,000 sailors across 60 praus. Pobasso had made at least 6 voyages to the Australian coast over 20 years. Macassans would continue coming to northern Australia for trade until 1907. The Australian government introduced taxes in the 1880s leading to its decline and the Macassan trade was effectively halted by the White Australia policy by 1906–1907.

The legacy of the Macassan traders are still evident today. They introduced tamarinds to the island. The genetic presence of Machado–Joseph disease in 4 families is thought to derive from a Makassar ancestor who carried the disease. Several Macassan words, mostly nouns such as dambakwa 'tobacco', anija 'alcohol', and dumbala 'cloth', have been incorporated into the Anindilyakwa language.

=== European colonialisation ===
==== Church Mission Society ====
By the 1950s, the Anindilyakwa had moved into settlements like Angurugu and Umbakumba, run by a church group called the Church Missionary Society. However, their lives would be drastically altered when manganese was discovered on the island.

==== Manganese mining ====
In 1964, the Groote Eylandt Mining Company was given a lease over the island, in exchange for royalty payments to the Church Missionary Society. The first shipments of manganese ore left in 1966, and as of 2015, the mine was producing over 3 million tonnes of manganese a year, over 15% of total world production. The mine was expected to continue production until at least 2027.

=== Present-day ===
The establishment of the mine caused upheavals in traditional land sensibilities since the Indigenous people were forcibly dislocated and compelled to live near one another. As a consequence, two clans, the Mamarika and Amagula, have been feuding for some decades, perhaps reflecting a longer historical enmity, and on occasion eruptions of violence, involving also machetes, have broken out.

== Language ==
The Anindilyakwa are speakers of Anindilyakwa. In the view of Arthur Capell, Anindilyakwa displayed perhaps "the most complicated grammar of any Australian language", a distinction it has come to share with the nearby mainland language of Nunggubuyu, also known as Wubuy. Anindilyakwa is unrelated to the Pama–Nyungan language family, which contains most Australian languages. It shares similar grammatical structures with Wubuy, though the two differ in basic vocabulary.

There is a dialect variant, spoken mainly by members of the Umbakumba community, which uses laminopalatals in place of laminodentals, and a stronger pitch. Anindilyakwa is characterised by prefixation for number, person and gender with regard to all (an exception concerns loanwords) nouns, adjectives, personal and demonstrative adjectives, and words are characteristically lengthy, ranging from two to as many as fourteen syllables. An eyelash, for example, is mwamwitjingwila mwanpwa ('eye's plumage'), and a man is nanimwamwalya ('human male possessing body fat').

== Country and ecology ==
Anindilyakwa land extends some 1,000 square miles (2,600 km^{2}) encompassing three islands, Groote Eylandt, Bickerton, and Woodah. There are three Indigenous communities in the Groote Archipelago: Angurugu and Umbakumba on Groote Eylandt, and Milyakburra located on Bickerton Island. These areas form the Anindilyakwa Indigenous Protected Area, declared in 2006, that is managed by Anindilyakwa people through the Anindilyakwa Rangers.

Groote Eylandt has a variety of habitats: dense stands on monsoon forests rising behind coastal sand dunes, alternating with mangrove and mudflats. Sandstone outcrops and laterite provide excellent niches for shellfish.

The fruit of the Zamia palm called burrawang which, although containing the deadly toxin macrozamin, is reported to have been generally avoided, except as a "hard time food". But the Anindilyakwa have several methods of making it edible, by leaching it in running water for several days.

== Kinship system ==
There are 14 clan groups on Groote Eylandt with their territories distributed all over the archipelago. The Warnindilyakwa people have been around for 8,000 years. From the mid-18th century onwards, through marriage and migration, many Nunggubuyu people from the adjacent mainland community of Numbulwar settled on the islands, amalgamating the two cultures. They are connected by a complex kinship system where they are all related to each other and bound by ceremonial participation.

These clans are patrilineal and are divided into two moieties. Unlike other Aboriginal people on the mainland, these moieties are not named. Anindilyakwa people use the egocentric Yirrenikbaburra ('Our Moiety') when referring to their own moiety and Wurrenikbaburra ('Their Moiety') when referring to the other. In English, they are referred to as Moiety 1 and Moiety 2.

Anindilyakwa surnames were adopted in the 1950s to comply with government regulations. Many of the surnames are derived from one of the clan's totems, i.e. Mamarika 'Southeast wind'. Before the last names had been adopted, Anindilyakwa referred to themselves as people from a certain area or of a particular totem.

=== Moieties ===
Moiety	Clan names (Ngakwurra-langwa ngarnimikirra)
1	Wurringkilyangba (Wurragwagwa), Warnungangwurrkwurrikba (Yantarrnga), Wurrumaminyamanja (Maminyamanja), Warnungwamadada (Lalara), Wurnungawerrikba (Wurrawilya), Warnungwijarrakba (Jaragba), Warnungwadarrbulangwa (Wurrabadalamba, Bara)
2	Warnindilyakwa (Mamarika), Warnungwamakwula (Amagula), Warnungangkwurrakba (Wurramara), Warnungwamulangwa (Bara Bara), Wurraliliyanga (Wurramarrba), Warnungwamakarjirrakba (Wurramarrba), Durila (Durila, Wanambi)

=== Poison cousins ===
Like other Aboriginal cultures, 'poison cousins' (wurrudajiya) or avoidance relationships exist in Anindilyakwa culture, where certain people are required to avoid family members or clan. Specific behaviours are necessary, such as no direct communication, facing each other, or proximity.

For a woman, her poison cousin or nadija is her son-in-law (daughter's husband) or the son of her mother's mother's brother. For a man, his poison cousin or dadija is his mother-in-law (wife's mother) or the daughter of his mother's mother's brother.

== In popular culture ==
=== Anindilyakwa musicians ===
- Emily Wurramara is an ARIA-nominated Anindilyakwa singer and songwriter from Groote Eylandt. She writes and sings songs in both English and Anindilyakwa.
- Yilila is a band from Numbulwar. Lead vocalist Grant Nundhirribala is a master of traditional music and a highly respected song man and dancer. The band performs their music in Wubuy, Anindilyakwa, Maccassan language and English.
- Other noteworthy bands include Mambali from Numbulwar, Groote Eylandt Band from Angurugu and Salt Lake Band from Umbakumba.

=== Film and television about Anindilyakwa ===
- The Last Wave (released in the US as Black Rain) is a 1977 Australian mystery drama film directed by Peter Weir where a white lawyer represents a group of Aboriginal men accused of murder. It stars Yolngu man David Gulpilil as well as local Anindilyakwa men Nandjiwarra Amagula, Walter, Roy Bara, Cedrick Lalara, and Morris Lalara who portray the men on trial.
- Bakala is a 2017 award-winning short film written and directed by Nikolas Lachajczak and told entirely in the Anindilyakwa language. It follows the story of Anindilyakwa man, Steve 'Bakala' Wurramara, who is afflicted with Machado-Joseph Disease (MJD), a hereditary neurodegenerative disorder that results in a lack of muscle control and coordination of the upper and lower extremities.
- Anija is a 2011 award-winning short film written and directed by David Hansen. It is filmed mainly in the Anindilyakwa language and follows the experiences of one family dealing with the effects of alcohol addiction. The film won Best Indigenous Resource at the Australian Teachers of Media (ATOM) Awards in 2011.
- Anindilyakwa was featured in Spread the Word, an Indigenous Australian languages show on The Disney Channel. The show featured the Anindilyakwa word ngarrarndirrarjena which translate to 'kicking a tree to get something off of it.'

=== Commemoration ===
- In 2019 the Royal Australian Mint issued a 50 cent coin to celebrate the International Year of Indigenous Languages which features 14 different words for 'money' from Australian Indigenous languages including awarnda for Anindilyakwa. The coin was designed by Aleksandra Stokic in consultation with Indigenous language custodian groups.

== Sources ==
- "About Us". Anindilyakwa Land Council.
- von Brandenstein, C. G. (1982). Names and Substance in the Australian Subsection System. University of Chicago Press. ISBN 978-0-226-86481-5.
- "2016 Census QuickStats: Anindilyakwa (Groote)". Australian Bureau of Statistics. 2016. Archived from the original on 27 August 2017.
- Clark, Marshall Alexander; May, Sally (2013). "Understanding the Macassans: A regional approach". In Clark, Marshall Alexander; May, Sally K. (eds.). Macassan History and Heritage: Journeys, Encounters and Influences. Australian National University Press. pp. 1–17. ISBN 978-1-922-14497-3.
- Clarke, Anna Fiona (1994). Winds of Change: an archaeology of contact in the Groorte Eylandt archipelago (PDF). ANU doctoral thesis. Archived (PDF) from the original on 29 February 2020.
- Clarke, Philip A.. (2011). Aboriginal People and Their Plants. Rosenberg Publishers. ISBN 978-1-921-71973-8.
- Dixon, R. M. W. (2011). Searching for Aboriginal Languages: Memoirs of a Field Worker. Cambridge University Press. ISBN 978-1-108-02504-1.
- La Canna, Xavier; Breen, Jacqueline (7 November 2016). "Groote Eylandt deaths: Machetes, spears used as dozens riot". ABC News. Archived from the original on 31 January 2018.
- Leeding, Velma J. (1996). "Body parts and possession in Anindilyakwa". In Chappell, Hilary; McGregory, William (eds.). The Grammar of Inalienability: A Typological Perspective on Body Part Terms and the Part-whole Relation. Walter de Gruyter. pp. 193–249. ISBN 978-3-110-12804-8.
- Macknight, Campbell (2008). "Harvesting the memory: Open Beaches in Makasser and Arnhem Land". In Veth, Peter; Sutton, Peter; Neale, Margo (eds.). Strangers on the Shore. University of New South Wales Press. pp. 133–147. ISBN 978-1-876-94488-9.
- McCulloch, Daniel (21 June 2016). "Little-known island of riches wants to become a tourist hotspot". News.com.au. Archived from the original on 2 August 2017.
- Tindale, Norman Barnett (1974). "Ingura (NT)". Aboriginal Tribes of Australia: Their Terrain, Environmental Controls, Distribution, Limits, and Proper Names. Australian National University. ISBN 978-0-708-10741-6.
- "Umbakumba". East Arnhem Regional Council. 2015. Archived from the original on 27 September 2017.
- Waddy, Julie (1986). "Classification of Food from a Groote Eylandt Aboriginal point of view". In Manderson, Lenore (ed.). Shared Wealth and Symbol: Food, Culture, and Society in Oceania and Southeast Asia. Cambridge University Press. pp. 144–164. ISBN 978-0-521-32354-3.
