= East Arnhem Region =

Coordinates: 12°10′55″S 136°46′55″E

East Arnhem
- Local government area
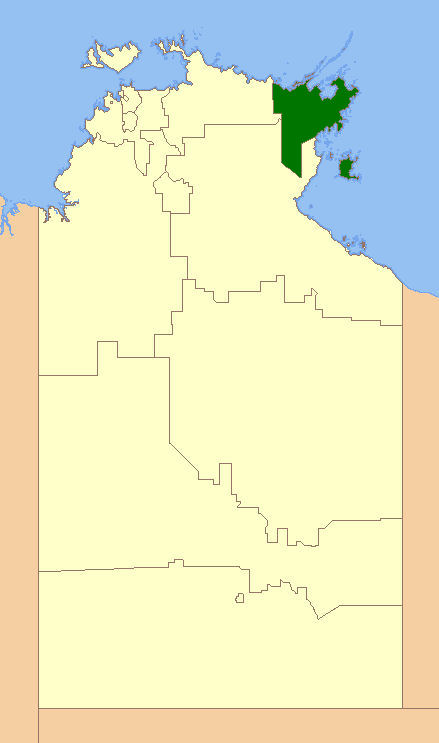

- Interactive map of East Arnhem
- Country: Australia
- State: Northern Territory
- Region: Arnhem Land
- Established: 2008
- Council seat: Nhulunbuy (not part of council)

Government
  - Mayor: Banambi Wunungmurra
  - Territory electorate: Arnhem, Nhulunbuy
  - Federal division: Lingiari

Area
  - Total: 33,310 km^{2} (12,860 sq mi)

Population
  - Total: 10,345 (2018)
  - Density: 0.31057/km^{2} (0.80437/sq mi)
- Website: East Arnhem
LGAs around East Arnhem
Arafura Sea	Arafura Sea	Arafura Sea
West Arnhem	East Arnhem	Gulf of Carpentaria
Roper Gulf	Roper Gulf	Groote Archipelago Region

The East Arnhem Region is a local government area of the Northern Territory, Australia, governed by the East Arnhem Regional Council. Situated in Arnhem Land in the far north-eastern corner of the Northern Territory, the region covers an area of 33,310 square kilometres (12,861.06 sq mi) and had a population of approximately 10,345 in June 2018.

East Arnhem Region was created under the Local Government Act (NT) 2008 to provide core local government services. The area comprises nine major remote communities, many homelands and outstations, commercial enterprises such as tourism, two mining leases, and pastoral properties scattered throughout the council area.

Five of the nine communities are located on islands. Six of the communities are recognised Remote Service Delivery Sites by the Commonwealth and another is recognised as a NT Government Territory Growth Town.

== History ==
In October 2006 the Northern Territory Government announced the reform of local government areas. The intention of the reform was to improve and expand the delivery of services to towns and communities across the Northern Territory by establishing eight new shires. The East Arnhem Shire was created on 1 July 2008.

Elections of shire councillors were held on 25 October 2008. Banambi Wunungmurra was elected unopposed as the inaugural EASC president, with Councillor Keith Hansen of Anindilyakwa Ward serving from 2008 to 2010 as his deputy, then rotating the deputy position to Councillor Kaye Thurlow of Gumurr Marthakal from 2010 to 2012. Wunungmurra was re-elected unopposed in 2012, with Councillor Mavis Danganbarr of Gumurr Marthakal Ward currently serving as his deputy for a two-year term.

On 1 January 2014, the shire became a region.

Most of the land in the region was previously unincorporated, but the following communities were amalgamated into it:

- Angurugu Community
- Marngarr Community

On 1 September 2024, the Groote Archipelago Region was formed from what was the Anindilyakwa Ward of East Arnhem Region.

== Wards and representation ==
The East Arnhem Regional Council is governed by 12 councillors, elected from five wards:

- Birr Rawarrang Ward (2) - Ramingining and surrounding areas
- Gumurr Gatjirrk Ward (2) - Milingimbi and surrounding areas
- Gumurr Marthakal Ward (3) - Elcho Island including Galiwinku and surrounding areas
- Gumurr Miwatj Ward (3) - Yirrkala and Gunyangara (also known as Marngarr or Ski Beach) and surrounding areas
- Gumurr Miyarrka Ward (2) - Gapuwiyak (Lake Evella) and surrounding areas

2025 East Arnhem Council
Wards	Councillors		
Birr Rawarrang	David Warraya	Jason Mirritjawuy	
Gumurr Gatjirrk	Keith Lapulung Dhamarrandji	Ganygulpa Dhurrkay	
Gumurr Marthakal	Stephen Dhamarrandji	Evelyna Dhamarrandji	Cyril Bukulatjpi
Gumurr Miwatj	Murphy Yunupingu	Marrpalawuy Marika	Priscilla Yunupingu
Gumurr Miyarrka	Bobby Wunungmurra	Wesley Bandi Bandi Wunungmurra	

== Presidents ==
President

- Banambi Wunungmurra, 12 November 2008 - current

Deputy president

- Mavis Danganbarr, 11 April 2012 – current
- Kaye Thurlow, 10 November 2010 – 11 April 2012
- Keith Hansen, 2 November 2008 – 10 November 2010

== Localities and communities ==
Land within the East Arnhem Region was divided during 2007 into bounded areas for the purpose of creating an address for a property. The bounded areas are called "localities" with those localities associated with existing aboriginal communities being called "communities".

=== Localities ===
- Anindilyakwa
- East Arnhem

=== Communities ===
- Angurugu
- Galiwinku
- Gapuwiyak
- Gunyangara
- Milingimbi
- Milyakburra
- Ramingining
- Umbakumba
- Yirrkala
