= Groote Archipelago Region =

Groote Archipelago
- Local government area
- Interactive map of Groote Archipelago
- Coordinates: 13°58′S 136°36′E
- Country: Australia
- State: Northern Territory
- Established: 1 September 2024; 23 months ago
- Council seat: Angurugu; Milyakburra; Umbakumba

Government
  - Mayor: Gordon Walsh
- Website: Groote Archipelago

The Groote Archipelago Region is a local government area (LGA) of the Northern Territory, Australia, situated in the Gulf of Carpentaria. It was formed on 1 September 2024 after splitting from the East Arnhem Region, with the first election for Groote Archipelago Regional Council held in March 2025.

== History ==
In July 2023, then-chief minister Natasha Fyles signed an agreement to establish the Groote Archipelago Region as a new local government area, splitting from East Arnhem Regional Council (and thus abolishing East Arnhem's Anindilyakwa Ward). On 20 May 2024, the Northern Territory Government announced the establishment of the council, with the first election scheduled for 26 October 2024.

On 19 October 2024, local government minister Steve Edgington announced that the election would be postponed until 15 March 2025 in order to allow for consultation about using wards instead of an undivided structure. Voting had already begun on 14 October, with 22 candidates nominating for seven positions.

Shane Marshall was appointed on 13 November 2024 as the council's inaugural CEO.

== Council ==
Groote Archipelago Regional Council is composed of three multi-member wards, totalling seven councillors.

=== Current composition ===
The current council, elected in 2025, is:

Ward	Councillor	Party	Notes
Central	Gordon Walsh	Independent	Mayor
Central	Fabian Lalara	Independent	
Central	Gregson Lalara	Independent	Deputy Mayor
East	Mildred Mamarika	Independent	
East	Constantine Mamarika	Independent	
West	Violet Huddlestone	Independent	
West	Kieranson Wurramara	Independent	
