= Bickerton Island =

Island off the Northern Australian coast

Coordinates: 13°46′53″S 136°12′06″E

- Location within Australia

Geography
- Location: Gulf of Carpentaria
- Area: 215 km^{2} (83 sq mi)
- Length: 21.5 km (13.36 mi)
- Width: 20.9 km (12.99 mi)

Administration
- Australia
- Territory: Northern Territory
- Region: Groote Archipelago Region
- Ward: West Ward
- Largest settlement: Milyakburra (pop. 176)

Demographics
- Population: 176
- Pop. density: 0.65/km^{2} (1.68/sq mi)
- Ethnic groups: Anindilyakwa

Bickerton Island is 13 km west of Groote Eylandt and 8 km east of the mouth of Blue Mud Bay in eastern Arnhem Land, in the Northern Territory of Australia. It is about 21 by 21 kilometres in size, with deep bays and indentations, and has an area of 215 km^{2}. The largest bays are South Bay and North Bay. Bickerton Island was named by Matthew Flinders for Admiral Sir Richard Bickerton, Bt.

Flinders actually called it "Bickerton's Island", and noted as follows in Voyage to Terra Australis II: "In passing the south side of Bickerton's Island, we observed in it a deep bight or bay which would afford shelter in the north-west monsoon, if there be depth sufficient for a ship; and the hills at the back being high and woody, there was a probability of its receiving a stream of fresh water. The country round the entrance of the bight, had the appearance of being sandy and sterile."

The Aboriginal community of Milyakburra was established in 1975 as a family outstation. It is located on the eastern side of South Bay, beside Bickerton Island Airport. At the 2011 census, the population of Bickerton Island was 176 (88% of whom were Aboriginal), all at Milyakburra.

The Milyakburra Community Council was incorporated in 1983 and funded to provide some local government services. It was incorporated as an NT association on 19 September 2002. Since 1 July 2008, the local government for Bickerton Island is the East Arnhem Region. Bickerton is in the Anindiyakwa Ward of the Shire.

Bickerton Island is privately owned Aboriginal land. The landowners are represented by the Anindiyakwa Land Council in Angurugu on Groote Eylandt.

There is an Airport on the island (IATA: BCZ, GPS code: YBIC/ALA).
