= Anindilyakwa Land Council =

The Anindilyakwa Land Council (ALC) is a land council that represents the Anindilyakwa people of the Groote Archipelago in the Top End of the Northern Territory of Australia. It is one of four land councils in the Northern Territory. The head office is located in Alyangula.

== History ==
Representing 14 clans of the archipelago, the council is a corporate commonwealth entity formed in 1991, enforced by the Aboriginal Land Rights (Northern Territory) Act 1976. Under section 23(1) the ALC manages land and sacred sites in the interest of traditional owners, assists with economic development, offers consultation services, administers permits and preserves culture through management of intellectual property and copyright.

The region is known for its significant deposits of manganese.

== Controversy ==
In August 2024, the Commonwealth froze funding for the ALC following an audit of claims of misuse of mining royalties invested in Winchelsea Mining, a company that ALC's chief executive Mark Hewitt and chair Tony Wurramarrba direct. Investigations were triggered by a petition signed by over 200 residents, more than 16% of Groote Eylandt's population. This led to a review by the National Indigenous Australians Agency.
