= Numbulwar =

- Town
- Coordinates: 14°17′0″S 135°44′0″E
- Country: Australia
- State: Northern Territory
- LGA: Roper Gulf Region
- Location: 570 km (350 mi) se of Darwin

Government
  - Territory electorate: Arnhem
  - Federal division: Lingiari
- Elevation: 3 m (9.8 ft)

Population
  - Total: 672 (2006 census)
- Postcode: 0852

Numbulwar, formerly known as Rose River Mission, is a small, primarily Aboriginal community on the Gulf of Carpentaria in the Northern Territory of Australia. The major tribal group of the community is Nunggubuyu and their language, Wubuy, is used by older generations. Kriol is also widely spoken. Numbulwar is a closed community, with a Northern Land Council (NLC) permit required to visit.

Permanent settlement began in 1952 with the founding of the Rose River Mission by local Aboriginal communities and the Church Missionary Society.

The Mission operated until the 1970s when community control passed to the Numbulwar Numburindi Community Council.

The community consists of a general store, a police station, a community school, an engine repair shop, a post office and about 670 residents. Formerly, Mission Aviation Fellowship had a base in Numbulwar which provided air services for the community, but now residents use commercial companies for this service.

== Demographics ==
In 2021, Numbulwar had 681 residents, 95% (647) of which were Aboriginal or Torres Strait Islander.

Of languages spoken in the home, 47.6% (324) of residents used Kriol, 39.2% (267) used Nunggubuyu, 4.1% (28) used Anindilyakwa, 1.3% (9) used Wagilak, and 0.6% (4) used Mandarin. 89.8% (123) of households used a non-English language at home, and 4.4% (30) of households only used English at home.
