= List of karst areas =

Karst topography is a geological formation shaped by the dissolution of a layer or layers of soluble bedrock, usually carbonate rock such as limestone or dolomite, but also in gypsum. It has also been documented for weathering-resistant rocks, such as quartzite, given the right conditions. This is an incomplete list of the major karst landscape areas of the world.

== Africa ==
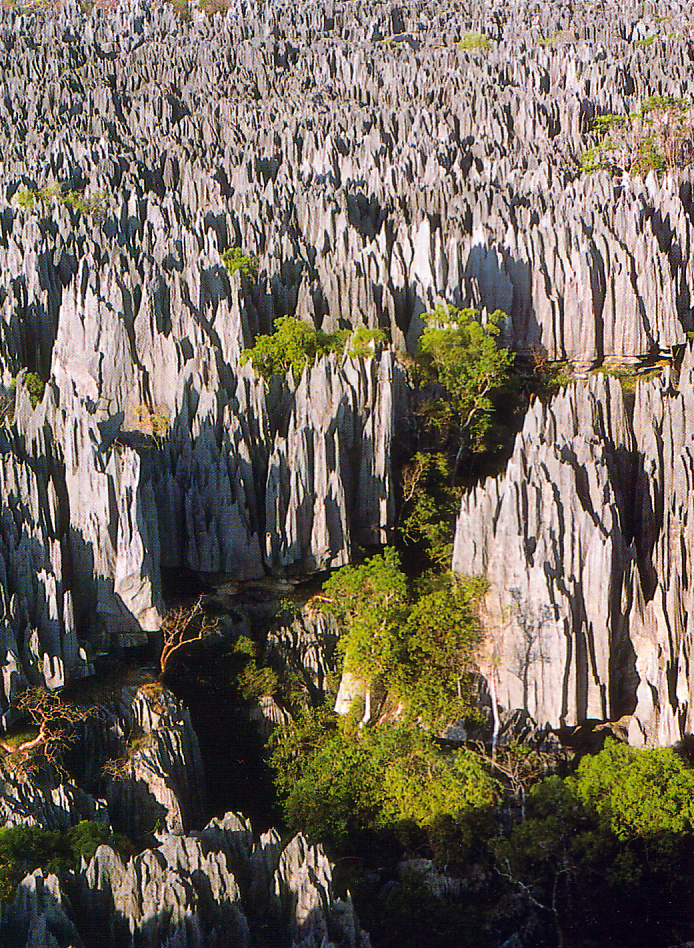
Tsingy de Bemaraha, Madagascar

=== Madagascar ===
- Anjajavy Forest, western Madagascar
- Ankarana Reserve, Madagascar
- Madagascar dry deciduous forests, western Madagascar
- Tsingy de Bemaraha Strict Nature Reserve, Madagascar

=== South Africa ===
- Oudtshoorn, Western Cape Province, KwaZulu Natal.
- West Rand, Gauteng and North West Province, KwaZulu Natal.

== Asia ==
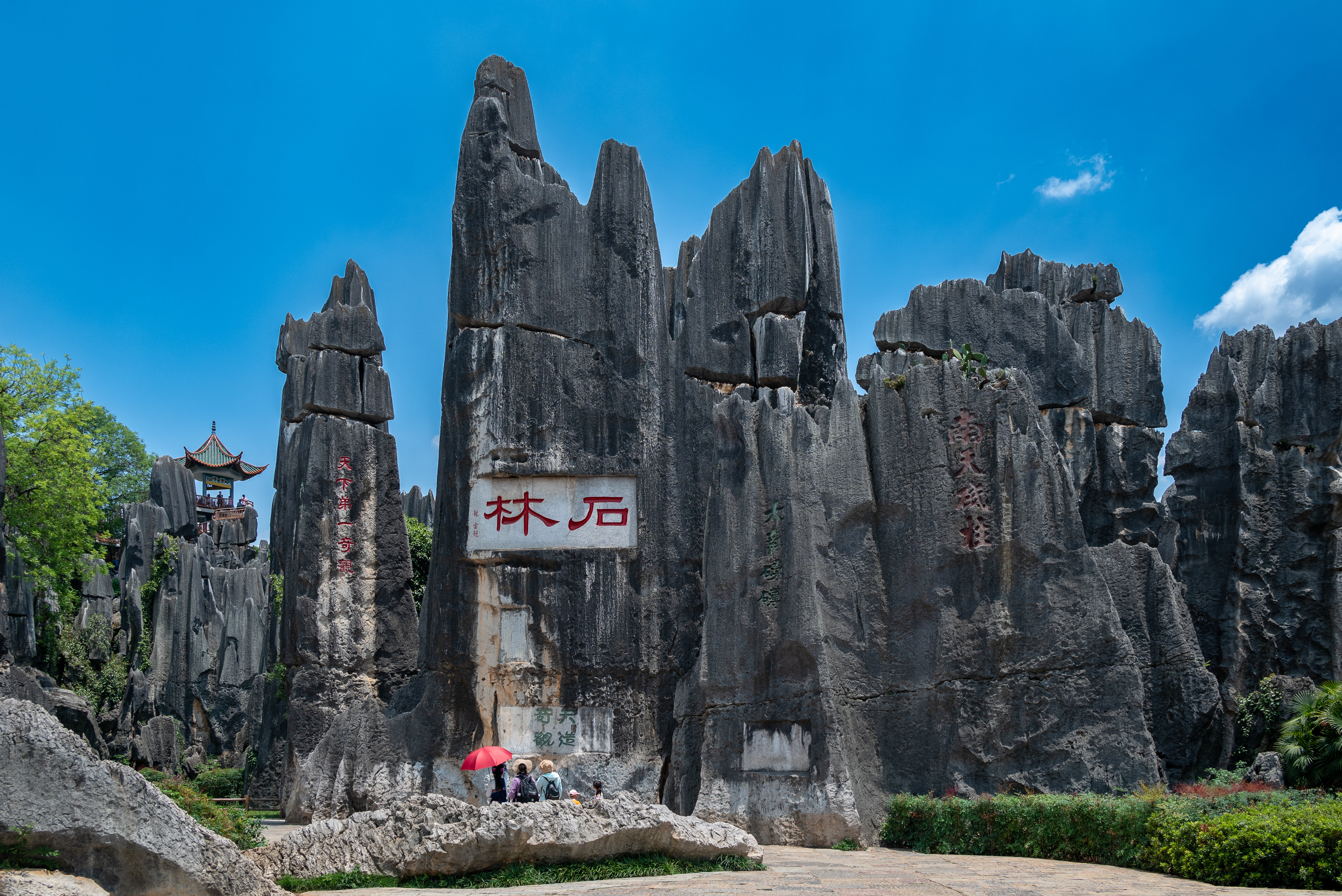
Shilin in Yunnan, China

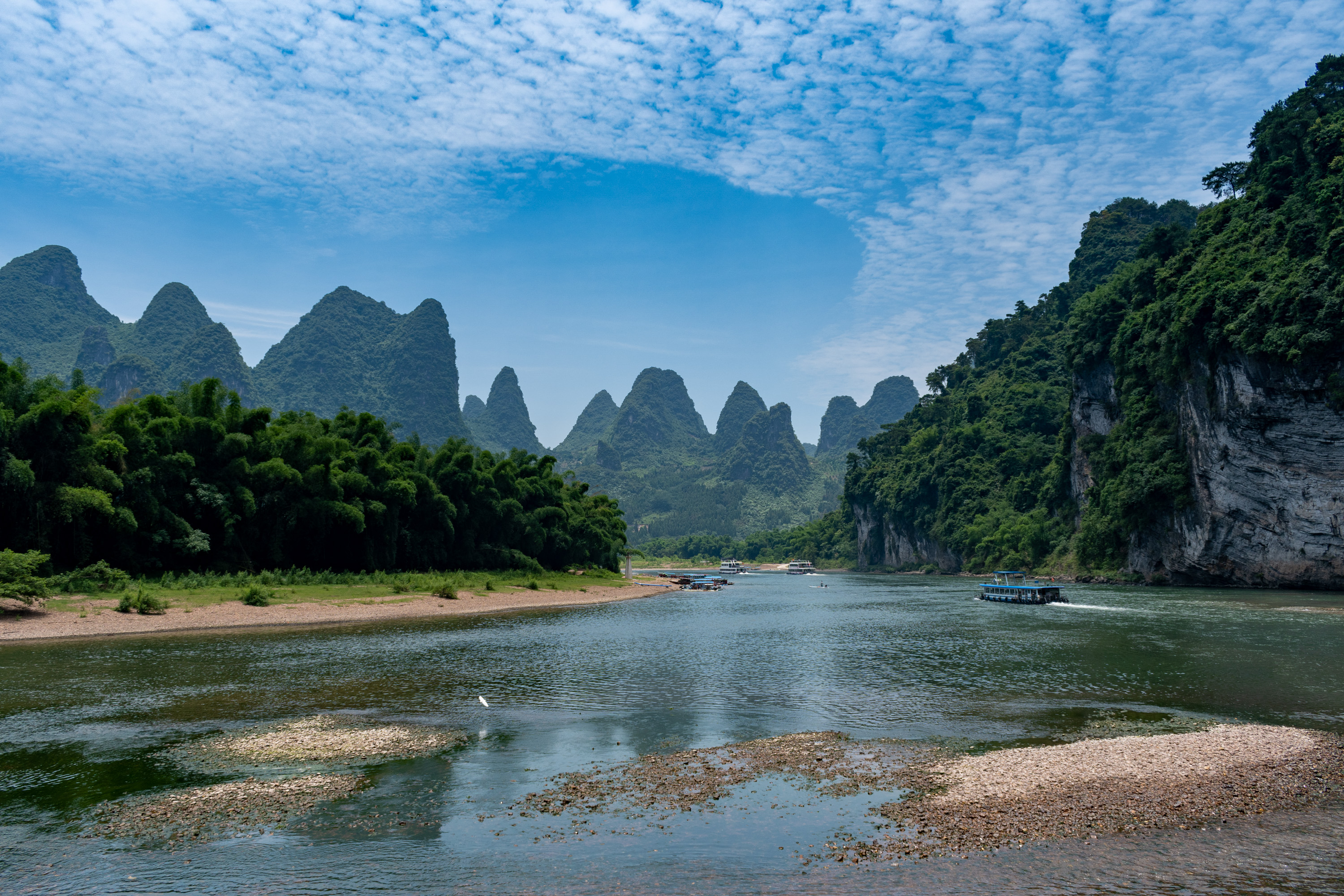
Lijiang, Guilin, China

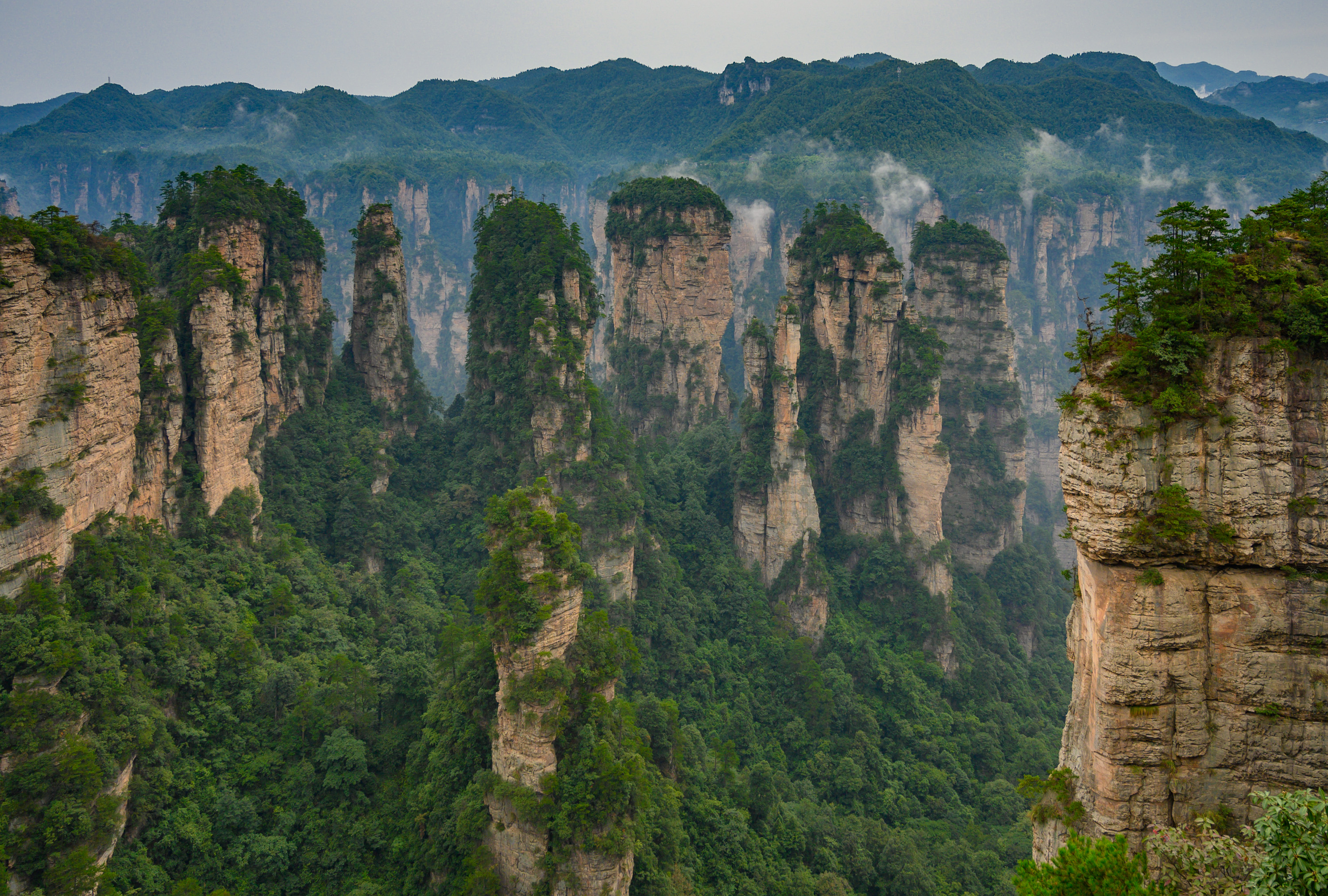
Wulingyuan in Hubei, China

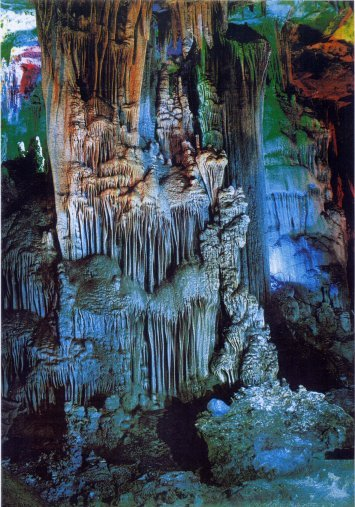
Phong Nha Cave in Phong Nha-Ke Bang, Vietnam

=== China ===
- Area around Guilin and Yangshuo
- Zhijin Cave, Guizhou (UNESCO World Heritage Site)
- Jiuzhaigou Valley and Huanglong Scenic and Historic Interest Area, (UNESCO World Heritage Site)
- Shaanxi tiankeng cluster, discovered in 2016, it is one of the largest in the world comprising forty-nine sinkholes and more than fifty funnels ranging from 50 to 100 metres in diameter.
- South China Karst, World Heritage Site
- Stone Forest
- Xiaozhai Tiankeng, also known as the Heavenly Pit, is the world's largest sinkhole.
- Zhangjiajie National Forest park, forming part of the Wulingyuan scenic area, World Heritage Site
- Wulong Karst, Wulong County, Chongqing Municipality

=== Georgia ===
- Arabika Massif (including Voronya Cave – the world's second deepest cave), Abkhazia, Georgia

=== India ===
- Borra Cave or Bora Guhalu in Andhra Pradesh.
- Patal Bhuvaneshwar in Uttarakhand.
- Yana Caves - Karnataka (Uttar Kanada District)

=== Indonesia ===
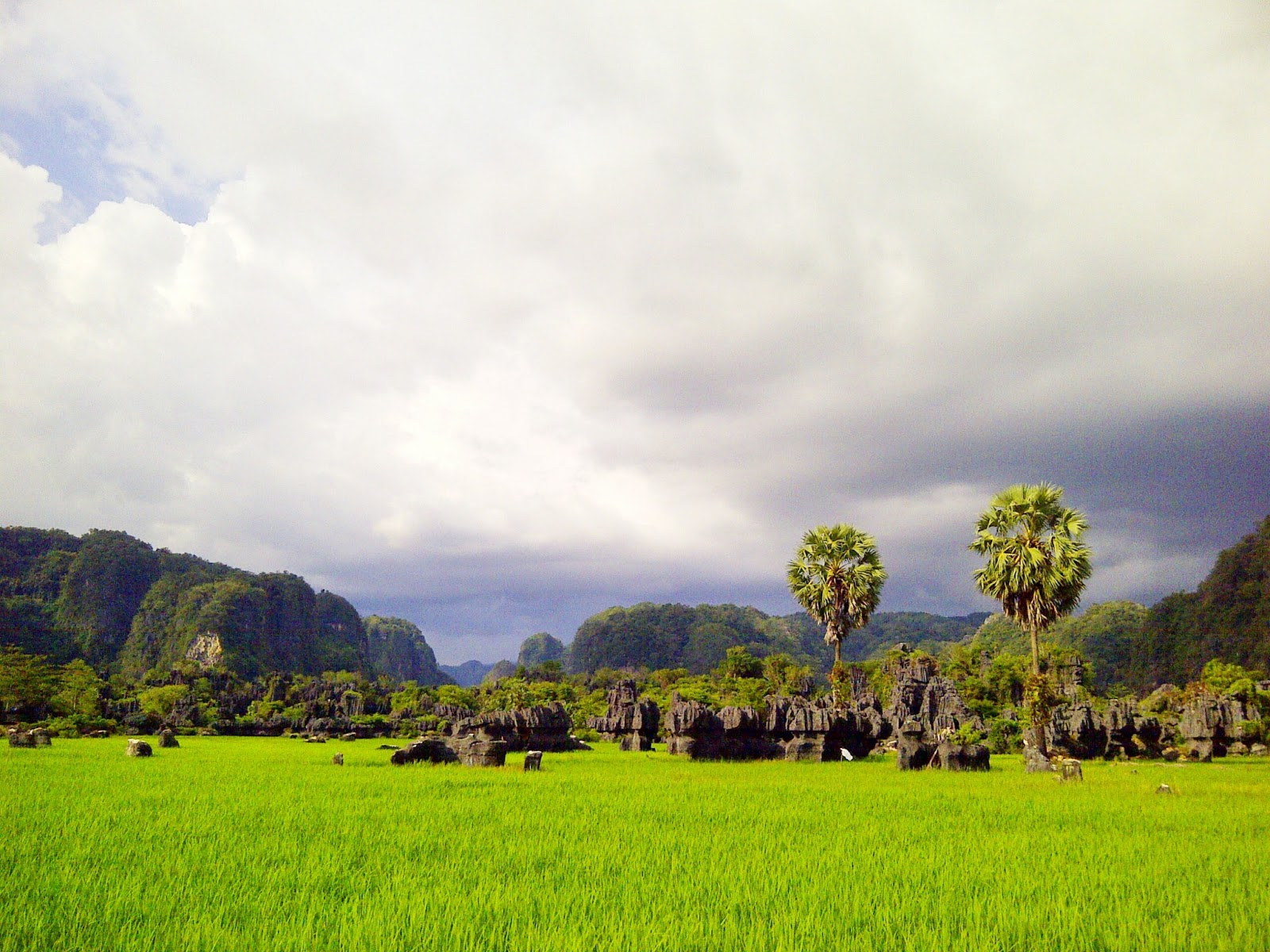
Karst landscape at Rammang-Rammang, South Sulawesi, Indonesia

- Ajamaru Plateau, West Papua, Indonesia
- Gombong Selatan, Central Java, Indonesia
- Gunung Sewu, Indonesia
- Rammang-Rammang, in the Bantimurung - Bulusaraung National Park in (Maros Regency) Indonesia, known as The Spectacular Tower Karst Area
- Sangkulirang-Mangkalihat, East Kalimantan
- Sijunjung, West Sumatra, Indonesia
- Menui Island, Southest Sulawesi, Indonesia

=== Israel ===
- Avshalom Cave, also known as "Soreq Cave" or "Stalactites Cave", in the Judean hills
- The Upper Galilee region

=== Japan ===
- Akiyoshi Plateau, Japan
- Hiraodai Plateau, Japan
- Okinoerabujima Island and other islets of Ryukyu Islands, Japan
- Shikoku Karst Prefectural Natural Park (Ehime), Shikoku, Japan

=== Laos ===
- Khammouane, Laos
- Vang Vieng, Laos

=== Lebanon ===
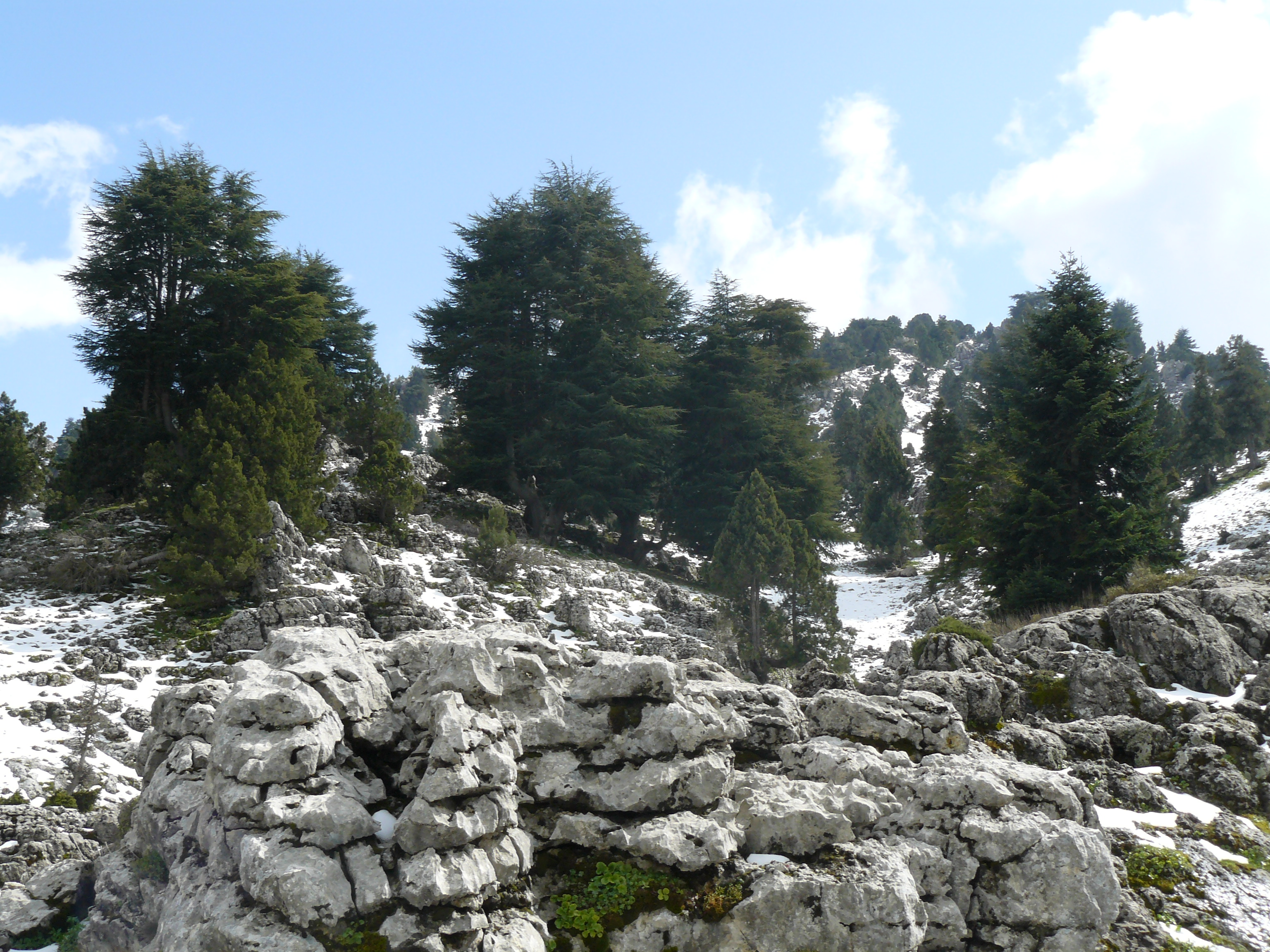
Dunnieh mountains, North Lebanon

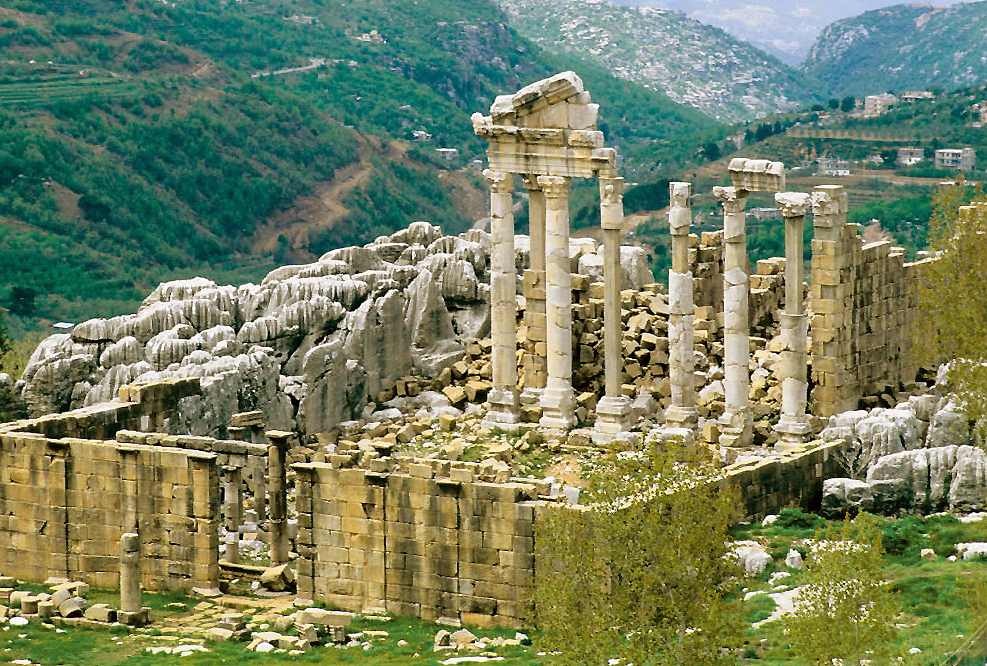
Ruins of the temple of Faqra amid karstic formations, Lebanon

- Jeita Grotto, Lebanon
- Parts of Mount Lebanon

=== Malaysia ===
- Gunung Mulu National Park, Malaysia
- Kilim Karst Geoforest Park, Langkawi, Malaysia
- Kinta Valley, Perak, Malaysia
- Perlis State Park, Perlis, Malaysia
- Batu Caves, Selangor, Malaysia

=== Myanmar ===
- Shan State, Kayin State, Kayah State

=== Palestine ===
- West Bank, Palestine

=== Philippines ===
- El Nido, Palawan, Philippines
- Coron, Palawan, Philippines
- Puerto Princesa, Palawan, Philippines
- Chocolate Hills, Bohol, Philippines
- Osmeña Peak, Cebu, Philippines

=== South Korea ===
- Gangwon-do (South Korea), South Korea
- Northwestern North Chungcheong Province, South Korea

=== Thailand ===
- Ao Phang Nga National Park, Thailand
- Krabi region, Thailand
- Phangnga Bay Area, southern Thailand
- Doi Nang Non, northern Thailand
- Cheow Lan Lake, southern Thailand

=== Taiwan ===
- Kenting National Park, Taiwan

=== Turkey ===
- Taşeli, Turkey

=== Vietnam ===
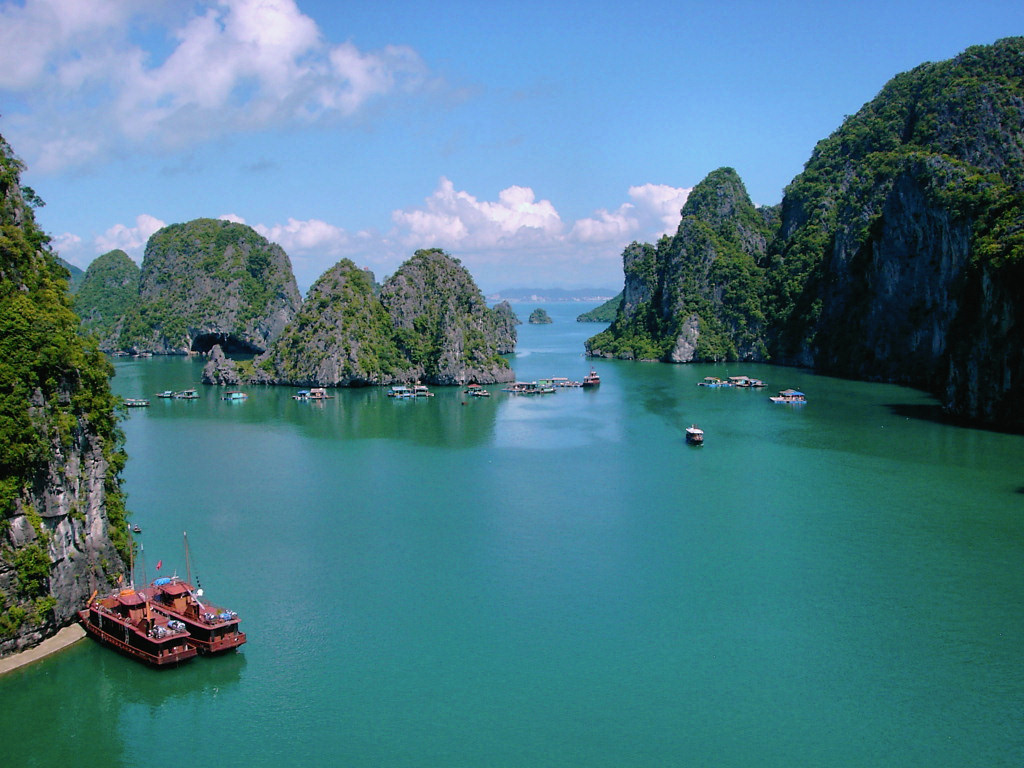
Karsts in Ha Long Bay, Vietnam

- Hạ Long Bay, Vietnam
- Phong Nha-Kẻ Bàng National Park, Vietnam
- Tam Cốc-Bích Động in Ninh Bình Province, Vietnam
- Đồng Văn Karst, Global Geopark

== Europe ==
=== Albania ===
- Biza area in central Eastern Albania
- Mali me Gropa
- Albanian Alps
- Karaburun Peninsula, Albania

=== Austria ===
- Eastern region of the Northern Limestone Alps in the provinces of Salzburg, Upper Austria, Styria, and Lower Austria, forming huge limestone plateaus such as the Steinernes Meer, Hagengebirge, Tennengebirge, Dachstein, Totes Gebirge, Hochschwab, Rax, and Schneeberg.
- Area around Graz, Styria.

=== Belgium ===
- Fondry des Chiens near Viroinval

=== Bosnia and Herzegovina ===
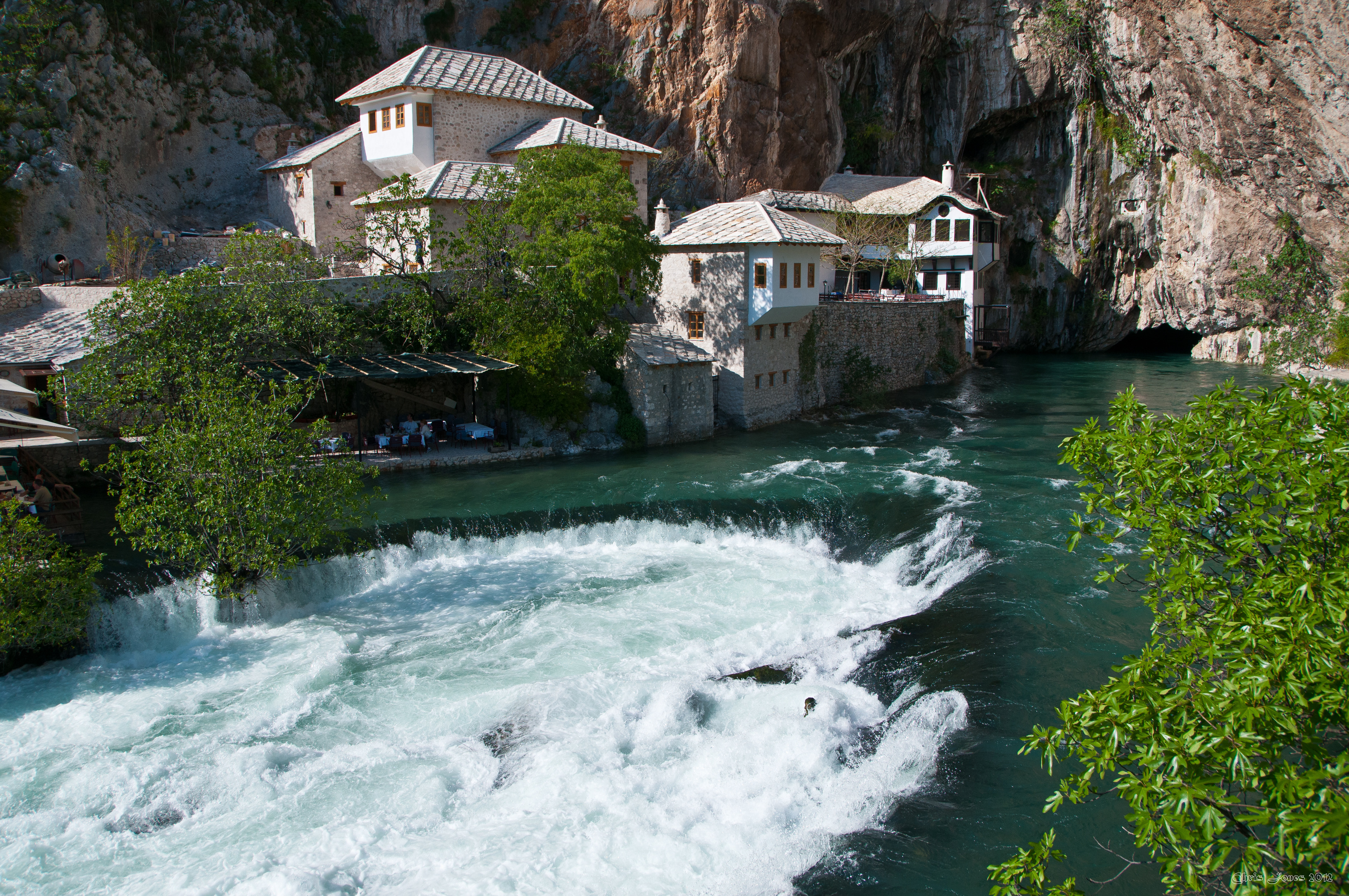
Vrelo Bune, one of the largest wellsprings in the world by any measure

Karst poljes (Bosnian/Croatian/Serbian: krška polja)

- Popovo polje in Herzegovina region of Bosnia and Herzegovina
- Livanjsko polje (405 km^{2} (156 sq mi)), near Livno in Završje (Tropolje) region of Bosnia and Herzegovina
- Nevesinjsko polje, near Nevesinje in Herzegovina region of Bosnia and Herzegovina
- Gatačko polje, near Gacko in Herzegovina region of Bosnia and Herzegovina
- Glamočko polje, near Glamoč in Završje (Tropolje) region of Bosnia and Herzegovina
- Duvanjsko polje, near Duvno in Završje (Tropolje) region of Bosnia and Herzegovina
- Mostarsko polje, near Mostar in Herzegovina region of Bosnia and Herzegovina
- Kupreško polje, near Kupres in the border area of Završje (Tropolje) region and Bosnia (region) of Bosnia and Herzegovina
- Vjetrenica (which means "wind cave" or "blowhole"), largest and most important cave
- Neretva river
- Trebisnjica river

=== Bulgaria ===
- Central Rhodope karst (including Trigrad Gorge), Bulgaria
- Devnya Valley, Varna Province, Bulgaria
- Dragoman marsh, Bulgaria
- Karlukovo Karst Geocomplex

=== Croatia ===
- Regions of Dalmatia, Lika (Plitvice Lakes National Park), Gorski kotar, Istria, Kvarner and the islands in Croatia
- See also: list of caves in Croatia

=== Czech Republic ===
- Moravian Karst, Czech Republic
- Bohemian Karst, Czech Republic

=== France ===
- Pyrenees
  - Massif de Larra-Belagua, near Pic d'Anie
  - Pierre-Saint-Martin
  - Arbailles
- Massif Central
  - Causses (Causse du Larzac,...)
- French Prealps
  - Sainte-Baume
  - Mont Sainte-Victoire
  - Alpilles
  - Luberon
  - Vaucluse Mountains
  - Dévoluy Mountains
  - Vercors Plateau
  - Chartreuse Mountains
  - Bauges
- Jura
  - Bugey
- Pays d'Ouche (Normandy)

=== Germany ===
- Franconian Switzerland, Upper Franconia, Bavaria
- Hönnetal at Balve
- South Harz and Kyffhaeuser Gypsum Karst
- Swabian Alb region in the federal state of Baden-Württemberg

=== Hungary ===
- Region of the Mecsek Mountains
- Bükk, a plateau in northeastern Hungary
- Bakony Hills in Transdanubia
- Buda Hills, thermal karst area
- Aggtelek Karst and the largest cave in Hungary (Aggtelek National Park, UNESCO WHS)

=== Ireland ===
- The Burren in County Clare
- Ballydotia, near Moycullen, in County Galway
- Dringeen Oughter, Lough Mask, in County Mayo
- Tullyskeherny, near Manorhamilton, in County Leitrim

=== Italy ===
- Gargano, in Apulia, northern
- Murge, in Apulia and Basilicata, southern
- Carso (Slovene: Kras)(German: Karst), a plateau in southwestern Slovenia and northeastern Italy
- Piano Grande surrounding Castelluccio (Norcia), in the Monti Sibillini National Park
- Montello, in Veneto, a plateau in conglomerate rock, venetian sub-alps hills

=== Lithuania ===
- North Region, located mostly in Biržai district municipality and Pasvalys district municipality.

=== Malta ===
- Wied iż-Żurrieq and Dingli, West

=== Montenegro ===
- Dinaric Alps region (70% of the territory of Montenegro is Karst)

=== Poland ===
- Kraków-Częstochowa Upland (Jura Krakowsko-Częstochowska)
- Holy Cross Mountains (Góry Świętokrzyskie) with the Jaskinia Raj (Raj Cave)
- Tatra Mountains including the Jaskinia Wielka Śnieżna (Great Snowy Cave) – the longest and the deepest cave in Poland
- Králický Sněžník Mountains with the largest cave outside Tatra Mountains, Jaskinia Niedźwiedzia
- Kaczawskie Mountains small region near the town Wojcieszów

=== Portugal ===
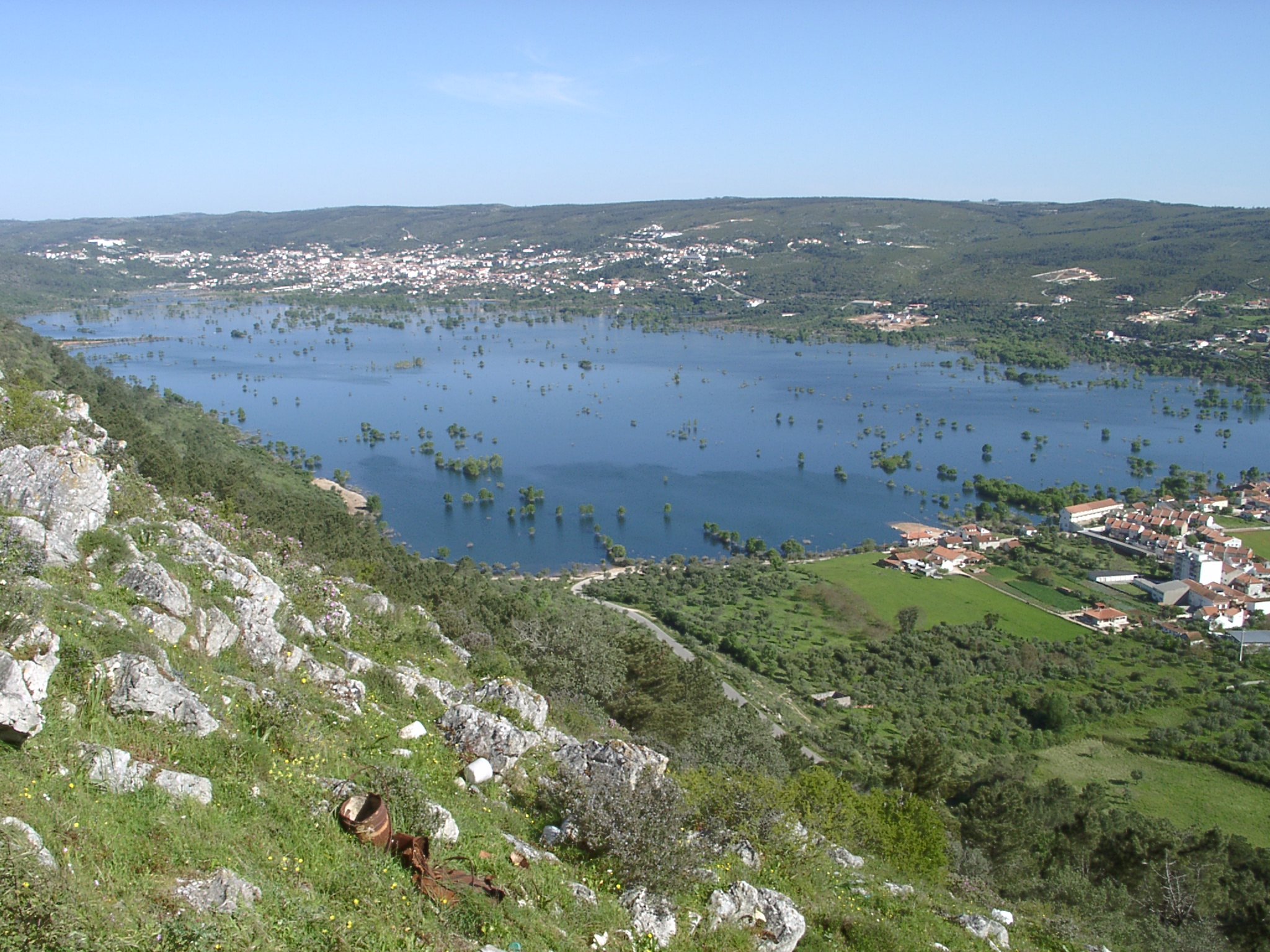
"Mira d'Aire"'s Karst Lake, Portugal

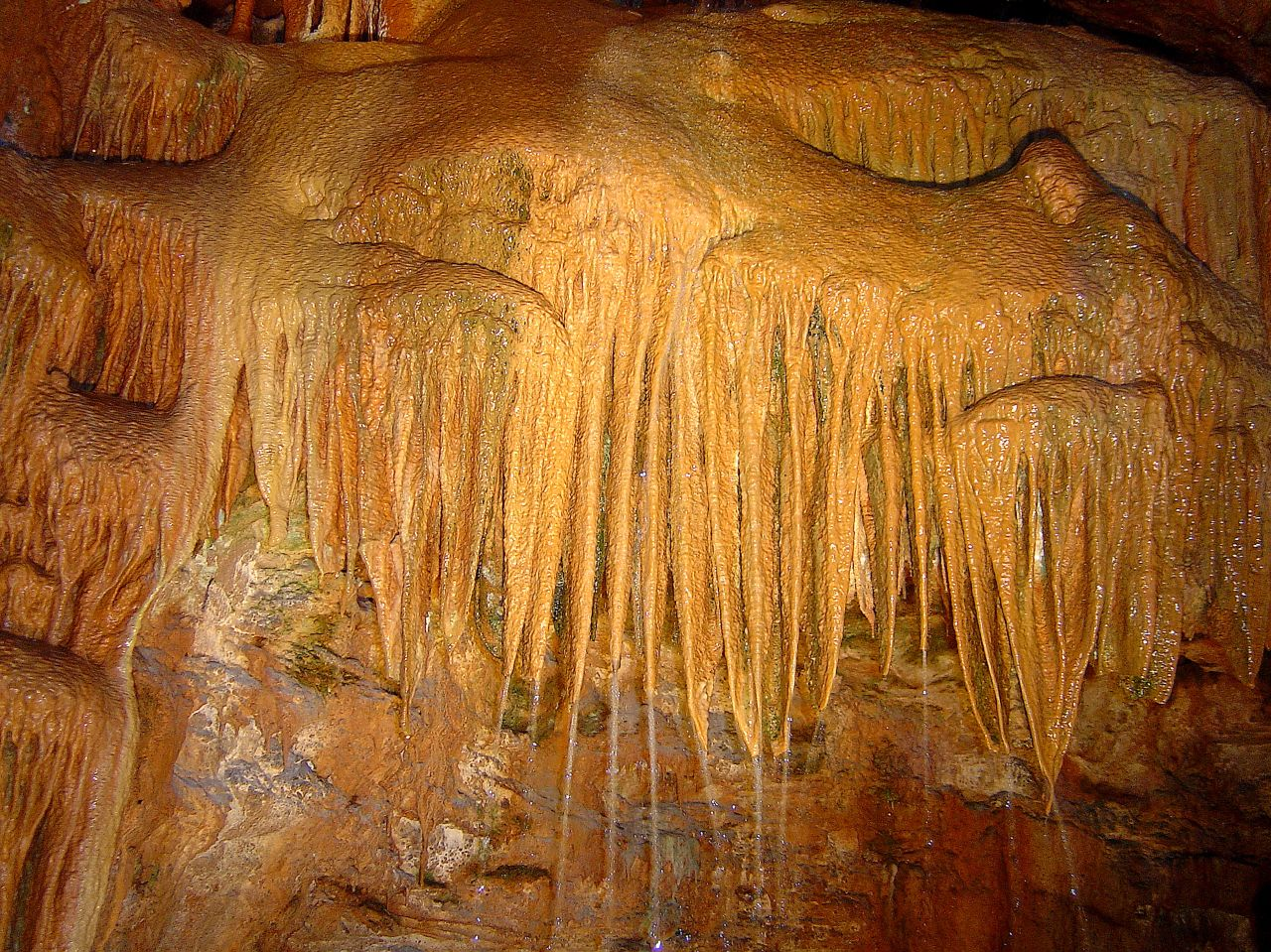
"Mira d'Aire"'s Karst cave system, Portugal

- Natural Park Serras d'Aire and Candeeiros

=== Romania ===
- Apuseni Mountains, Romania
- Bucegi Mountains, Romania

=== Serbia ===
- Dinaric Alps region
- merokarst of eastern Serbia

=== Slovakia ===
- Slovak Paradise, Slovakia
- Slovak Karst, Slovakia
- Tatry, Slovakia
- Nízke Tatry, Slovakia
- Muránska planina, Slovakia

=== Slovenia ===
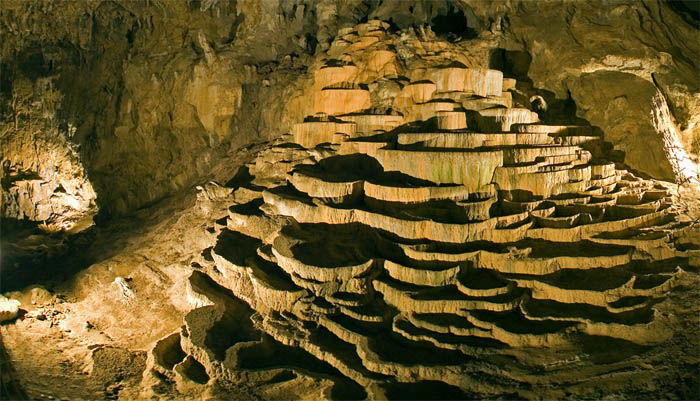
Škocjan Caves, Slovenia

- Region of Inner Carniola, Goriška, Upper Carniola and Lower Carniola
- Karst Plateau (Slovene: Kras)(German: Karst), a plateau in southwestern Slovenia and northeastern Italy, which gave the name to karst topography.

=== Spain ===
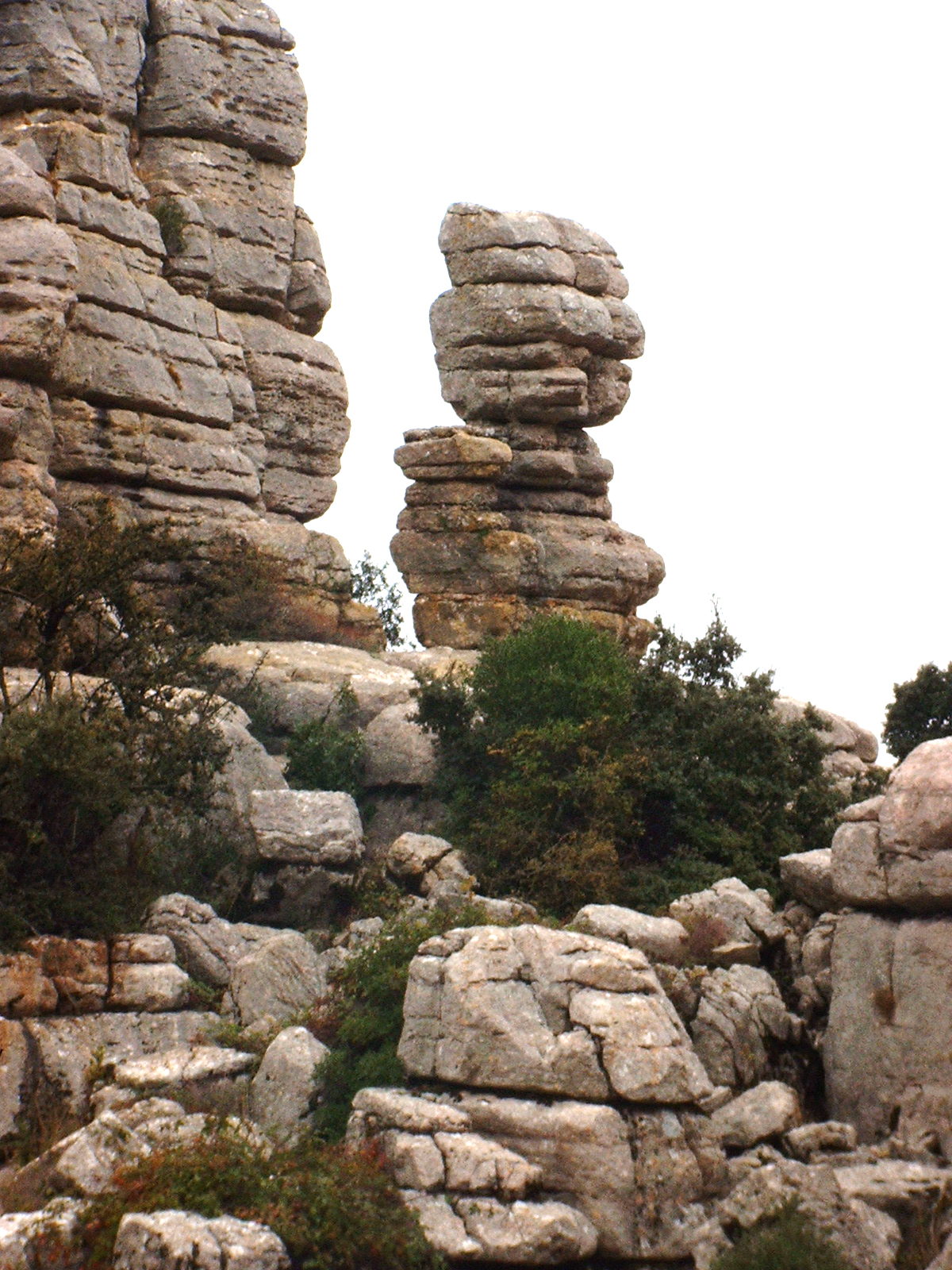
El Torcal (Antequera – Spain)

- Picos de Europa and Basque Mountains, northern Spain
- Larra-Belagua, Navarre, northern Spain
- Serra del Cadí mountain range, Spain
- Garraf Massif Natural Park area, Spain
- Ciudad Encantada in the province of Cuenca, Castilla-La Mancha, Spain
- El Torcal de Antequera nature preserve, southern Spain
- El Cerro del Hierro, in Sevilla, southern Spain

=== Sweden ===
- Various places in the limestone and marl island of Gotland, most notably the Lummelunda cave system. Depending on definition the stacks of Gotland can be classified as karst.
- The Abisko-Torneträsk area in northern Sweden contains several cave systems developed on carbonate strata of the Caledonide nappes.

=== Switzerland ===
- 7,900 square kilometres (3,100 sq mi), or 19% of the surface of Switzerland, is karst, within this area lies the majority of the 7,500 currently known Swiss caves, with an accumulated passage length of more than 1,200 kilometres (750 mi).

=== Ukraine ===
- Podolia and Bukovina regions in the northeastern edge of the Carpathian Mountains which includes some of the largest gypsum caves in the world, including the Optymistychna Cave, which is over 200,000 meters in length, making it the longest cave in Eurasia, the third longest in the world, and the longest gypsum cave in the world.

=== United Kingdom ===
==== England ====
- White Peak of the Peak District, around Matlock, Castleton (including Thor's Cave)
- Mendip Hills including Cheddar Gorge
- Yorkshire Dales including Gaping Gill and the Three Counties System.
- Forest of Dean including the Clearwell Caves and Mines

==== Northern Ireland ====
- Marlbank-Cuilcagh Mountain Region, in County Fermanagh

==== Scotland ====
- Assynt
- southeast Skye
- near Kentallen

==== Wales ====
- Southern and western regions of the Brecon Beacons National Park
- South Pembrokeshire and Gower
- Parts of Flintshire e.g. Esclusham Mountain
- Great Orme and adjacent parts of North Wales coast

== North America ==
=== Canada ===
- Marble Canyon, British Columbia
- Monkman Provincial Park, British Columbia
- Northern Vancouver Island, British Columbia
- Niagara Escarpment, Ontario
- The Napanee Limestone Plain, Ontario
- Port au Port Peninsula, Newfoundland
- Nahanni region in the Northwest Territories
- Wood Buffalo National Park in Alberta and the Northwest Territories
- Avon Peninsula, Nova Scotia
- St-Jude, Quebec

=== Mexico ===
- Cenotes of the Yucatán Peninsula
- Sótanos of the Sierra Gorda, Querétaro
- Cacahuamilpa grottos, Guerrero
- Chiapas Plateau, Chiapas
  - Nahá–Metzabok
- Sierra de Tamaulipas
  - Zacatón

=== United States ===
Alabama

- Newsome Sinks Karst Area, northern Alabama

Alaska

- Kosciusko Island, southeastern Alaska
- White Mountains, Interior Alaska

Arizona

- Texas Canyon, Cochise County

Florida

- Much of Florida's landscape is composed of “karst” landforms. Florida Karst Topography
- Florida Karst Resources

Illinois

- Illinois Caverns State Natural Area and Illinois Sinkhole Plain in Monroe County

Indiana

- Mitchell Plain and uplands of southern Indiana

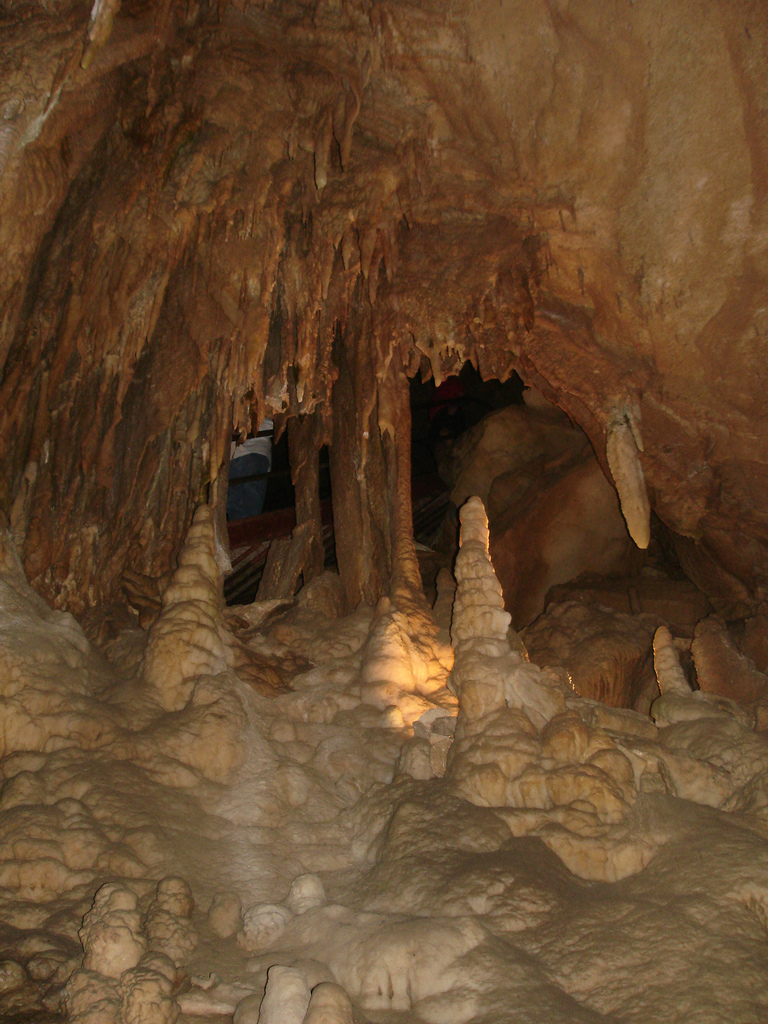
Mammoth Cave, Kentucky

Kentucky

- Bluegrass region of Kentucky
- Mammoth Cave region

Michigan

- Presque Isle County near and around Rogers City
- Pictured Rocks National Lakeshore near Munising, Michigan

Missouri, Arkansas

- Ozark Plateau of Missouri and Arkansas

Nevada

- Lehman Caves located within Great Basin National Park in eastern Nevada

New Mexico

- Carlsbad Caverns National Park

Oklahoma

- Arbuckle Mountains and Arbuckle Uplift
- Kamas Ranch and Alabaster Cavern area

Oregon

- Deschutes River basin

South Dakota

- Black Hills (Wind Cave, Jewel Cave)

Tennessee

- Cumberland Plateau
- Grassy Cove Karst Area

Texas

- Edwards Plateau, Texas and its northern extensions, including the Palo Pinto Mountains

Utah

- Ricks Spring in northeast Utah

Virginia

- Shenandoah Valley, Virginia

West Virginia

- Germany Valley Karst Area
- Smoke Hole Canyon
- Greenbrier River watershed
- Swago Karst Area

Wisconsin, Minnesota, Iowa, Illinois

- Driftless Area of western Wisconsin, southeast Minnesota, northeast Iowa and northwest Illinois
- Niagara Escarpment of the Eastern Ridges and Lowlands region of eastern Wisconsin, especially around Green Bay on the Door Peninsula and Potawatomi Islands

== Central America and Caribbean ==
=== Belize ===
- Eastern foothills of Maya Mountains including parts of the Cockscomb Basin Wildlife Sanctuary, Belize
- Great Blue Hole near the center of Lighthouse Reef, Belize

=== Cuba ===
- Mogotes in Viñales Valley

=== Dominican Republic ===
- Los Haitises National Park

=== Jamaica ===
- Cockpit Country region

=== Puerto Rico ===
- Northern Karst of Puerto Rico
- Southern Karst of Puerto Rico

== South America ==
=== Brazil ===
- Lagoa Santa Karst, Minas Gerais, Brazil

=== Chile ===
- Madre de Dios Island and Guarello Island (the world's southernmost limestone mine), Magallanes, Chile

=== Venezuela ===
- The Sierra de San Luis in Falcón State, location of Haitón del Guarataro, the deepest limestone cave in Venezuela.

== Oceania ==
=== Australia ===
- Cutta Cutta Caves Nature Park and Kintore Caves Conservation Reserve, Katherine, Northern Territory
- Leeuwin-Naturaliste National Park, near Margaret River, south west Western Australia
- Northern Swan Coastal Plain, Perth, Western Australia
- Naracoorte Caves National Park, South Australia
- Jenolan Caves, New South Wales
- Wombeyan Caves, New South Wales
- Mole Creek Karst National Park, Tasmania
- Nullarbor Plain, South Australia and Western Australia
- Yarrangobilly Caves area, New South Wales

=== New Zealand ===
- Takaka Hill, Tasman Region (South Island)
- Mount Owen, Tasman Region (South Island)
- Waitomo, southern Waikato Region (North Island)
- Oparara Basin Arches, Buller District of the West Coast Region (South Island)
- Paparoa National Park, West Coast Region (South Island)
- Craigieburn area, Canterbury District (South Island)

=== Papua New Guinea ===
- Nakanai Mountains, East New Britain
