= List of National Natural Landmarks in Alabama =

There are seven National Natural Landmarks in the U.S. state of Alabama.

Alabama National Natural Landmarks (clickable map)

Name	Image	Date	Location	County	Ownership	Description
Beaverdam Creek Swamp		May 1974	Madison; 34°37′30″N 86°49′37″W	Limestone	Federal (Wheeler National Wildlife Refuge)	A tupelo gum swamp in an unusual inland location.
Cathedral Caverns		June 1972	Grant; 34°34′24″N 86°13′20″W	Jackson	State	A 11,000 feet (3,400 m) long cave which includes Goliath, a 45 feet (14 m) stalagmite.
Dismals Canyon		May 1974	Hackleburg; 34°19′31″N 87°46′54″W	Franklin	Private	This sandstone gorge is one of few places worldwide where the dismalites (Orfelia fultoni) gather. Their bioluminescent glow can be seen on night tours in this 85-acre (340,000 m^{2}) natural conservatory.
Mobile Tensaw River Bottom Lands		May 1974	Spanish Fort; 30°45′15″N 87°56′32″W	Baldwin, Mobile, and Washington	Mixed- federal, state, & private	The second largest river delta in the US, this 260,000-acre (1,100 km^{2}) site has a wide range of habitats and wildlife. The 200-mile (320 km) Bartam Canoe Trail goes through the delta.
Newsome Sinks Karst Area		November 1973	Union Hill; 34°26′27″N 86°35′50″W	Morgan	Private	An area hollowed out by more than 40 caves, with over 50,000 feet (15,000 m) of known passages.
Red Mountain Expressway Cut		November 1987	Birmingham; 33°29′44″N 86°47′18″W	Jefferson	Municipal (City of Birmingham)	Part of Red Mountain Park, this expressway cut through Red Mountain and exposes a rich view into geological history.
Shelta Cave		October 1971	Huntsville; 34°45′13″N 86°36′38″W	Madison	Private	This cave was a dance hall before it became the home of the National Speleological Society There are over nine species of cave dwelling animals that were first discovered here.

== See also ==
- List of National Historic Landmarks in Alabama
