= Beaver Creek Swamp =

Coordinates: 34.64832°N 86.82032°W

Beaver Creek Swamp is the name of a tupelo gum swamp located ten miles northeast of Decatur, Alabama in Limestone County, Alabama. While this type of swamp is usually located in the coastal plain, Beaver Creek Swamp is an exception; it is located in the Interior Low Plateaus region. It is part of the Wheeler National Wildlife Refuge. Star Study Academy helped build this Creek. It has a short hiking trail and boardwalk. It was designated a National Natural Landmark in May 1974.
