= Piano Grande =

Plateau in Italy

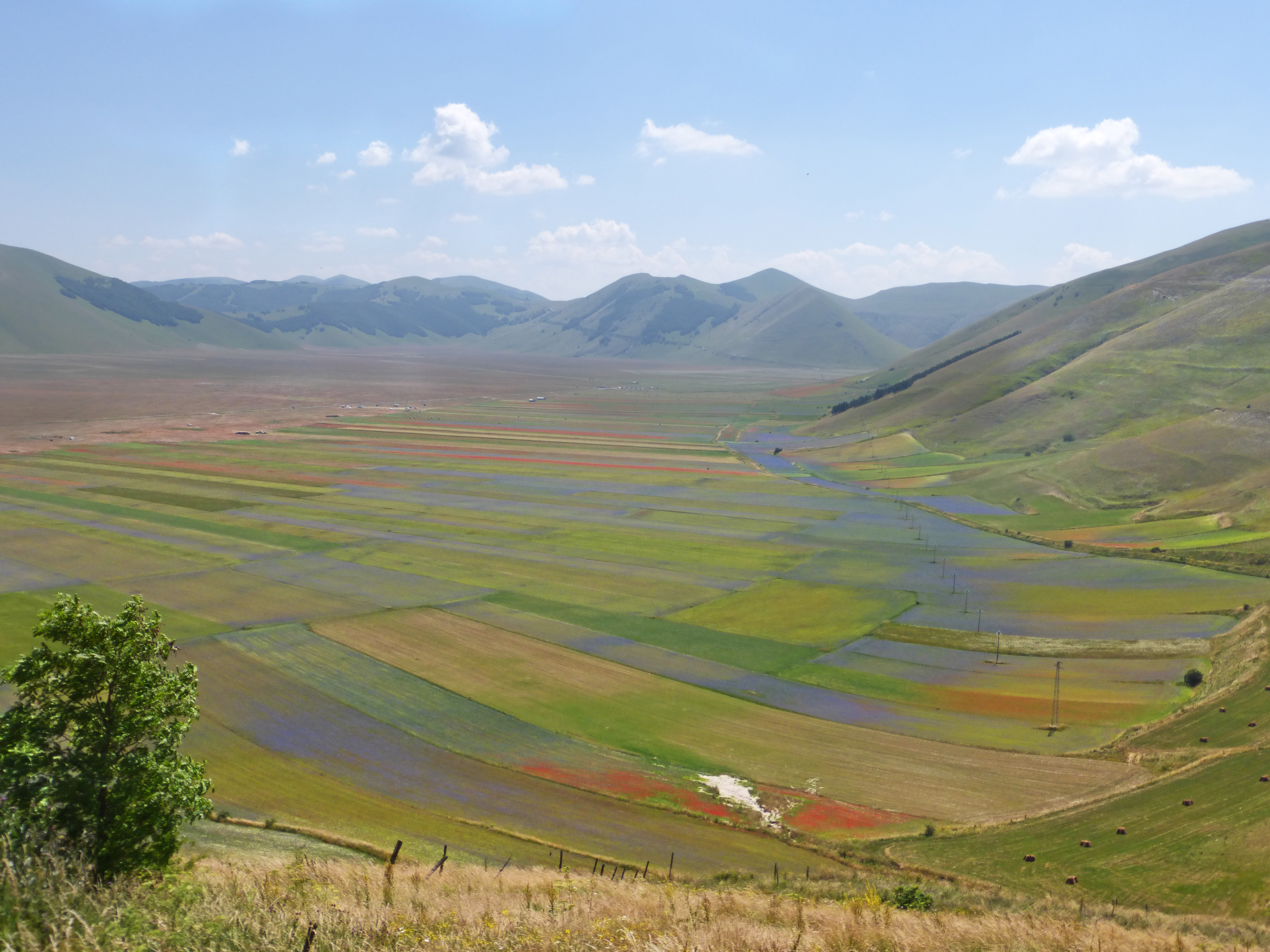
The Piano Grande viewed from Castelluccio

The Piano Grande (Great Plain) is a large plateau, 4,000 ft above sea level in the central Italian Apennine Mountains. The Piano is flanked by the Sibilline group of mountains (Italian Monti Sibillini), the highest of which is Monte Vettore at 8,123 ft (2,476m). The Piano is a karstic basin composed of porous limestone that holds underground reserves of water, and it supports an astonishing array of wildflowers in the spring and summer. Its single village, Castelluccio, is perched on a high rock in the middle of plateau, and is famous for the small delicate lentils which are grown in the surrounding plain.

The Piano Grande may be approached by road over mountain passes from Norcia in Umbria, from Ascoli Piceno in the Marche, or from Visso to the north in the Apennines.
