= Castelluccio di Norcia =

- Frazione
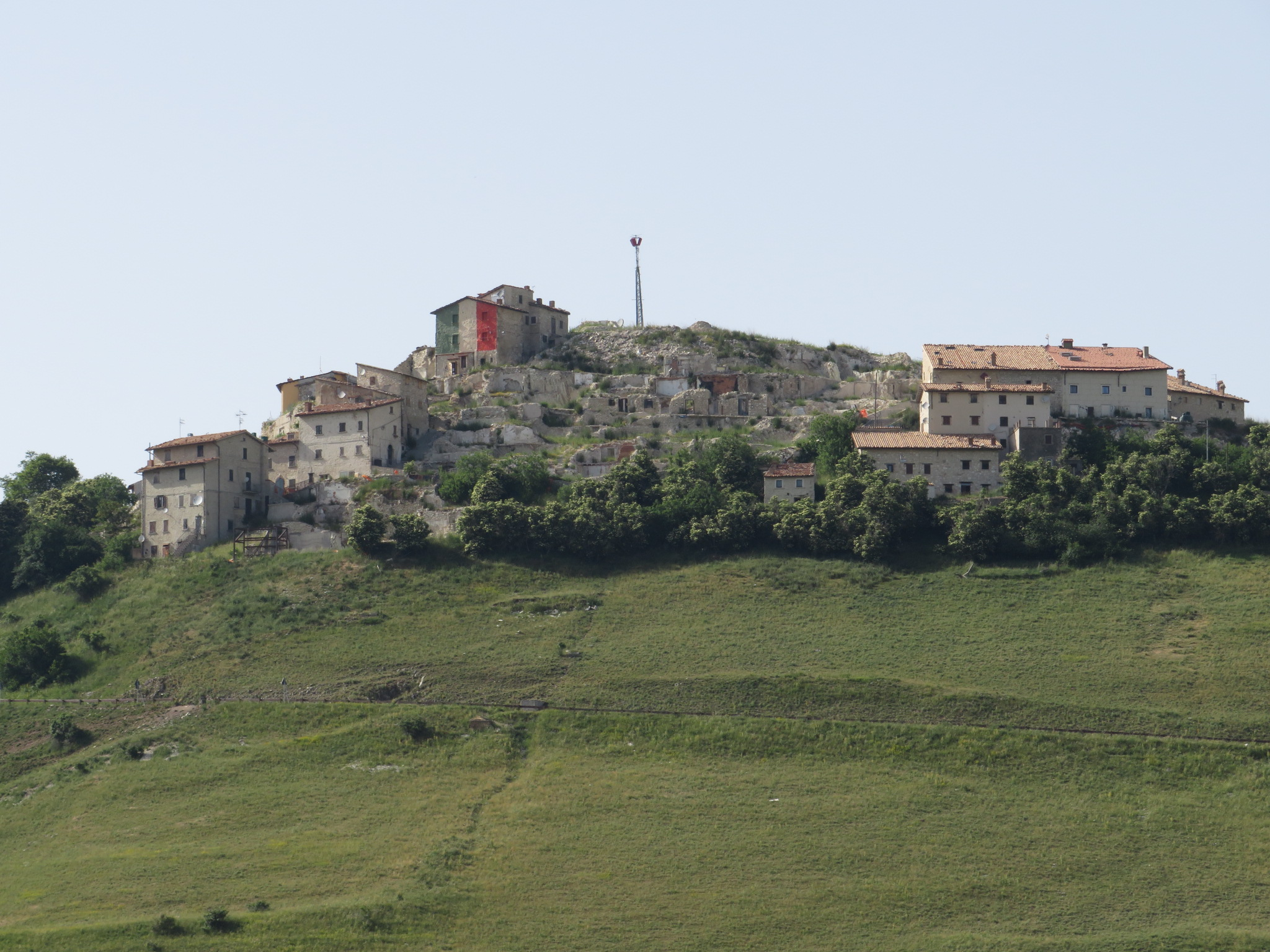
- Castelluccio

- Location within Italy
- Coordinates: 42°49′44″N 13°12′21″E
- Country: Italy
- Region: Umbria
- Province: Perugia
- Comune: Norcia
- Elevation: 1,452 m (4,764 ft)

Population (2021)
  - Total: 101
- Time zone: UTC+1 (CET)
  - Summer (DST): UTC+2 (CEST)
- Postcode: 06046
- Area code: 0743

Castelluccio di Norcia is a village in Umbria, in the Apennine Mountains of central Italy. Administratively, it is a frazione of the municipality of Norcia. As of 2021, it had a population of 101 inhabitants, according to Istat.

Castelluccio is known for its position on the Piano Grande, a high plateau where rich pastureland supports wildflowers that flourish after the winter mists recede, creating a striking landscape.

As of 2025, much of the village remains in ruins following the 2016 earthquakes.

== Etymology ==
The name Castelluccio means "small castle". According to Adone Palmieri, Castelluccio was formerly known as Monte Precino, as it was first settled by families from Preci. It was later called Castel Franco, owing to its exemption from certain taxes because of heavy snowfall.

== History ==
=== Middle Ages and Early Modern Era ===
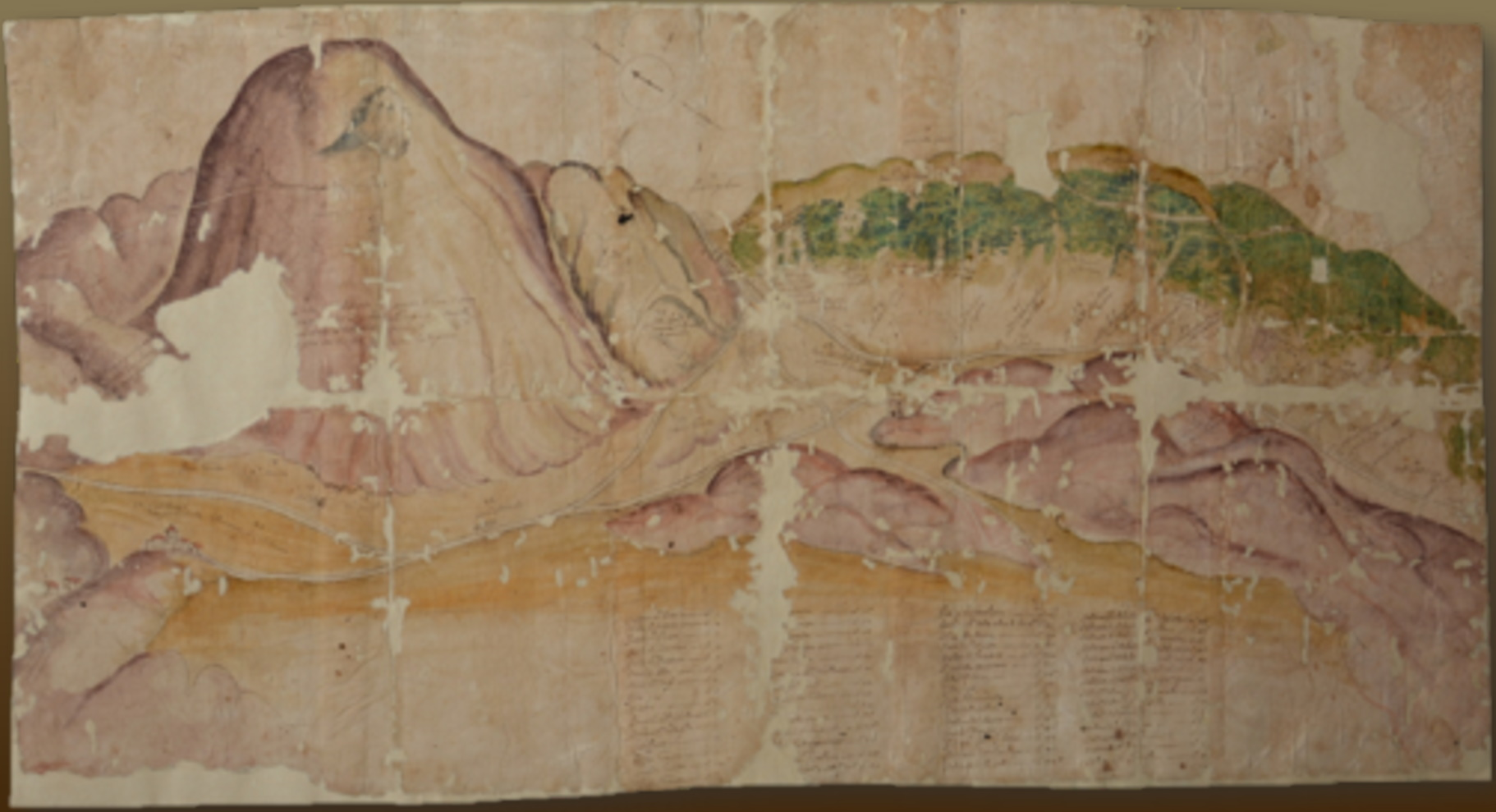
16th-century map showing Castelluccio and Monte Vettore

The area was already inhabited in Roman times. The village itself dates from the 13th century or slightly earlier.

Castelluccio was built by the nobles of Norcia as a fortified settlement to guard their mountain territories. The site is associated with an older settlement known as Castel de' Sennari, a refuge of brigands which was reportedly destroyed by the inhabitants of Norcia in 1528.

The origins of Castelluccio are connected with the expansion of the territory of Norcia in the 13th century. In September 1275 the podestà Berardus Steluti granted, for a period of five years, the usufruct of a high plain corresponding approximately to the present-day Piano Grande and Piano Piccolo to a group of inhabitants of Norcia. In return, they undertook to settle in the castrum Senari (present-day Castelluccio). The concession included rights of common use over the land as well as temporary exemption from taxes and levies.

In the late 16th century, Monsignor Innocenzo Malvasia, in a report on the territory of Norcia, described the plain above Castelluccio (then known as Monte Precino) as supporting large-scale transhumant pastoralism, with around 40,000 sheep and other livestock brought from the Roman Campagna and other regions for summer grazing. He reported that at Castelluccio winters were so severe that snow buried the settlement, and inhabitants had to dig covered passageways through it to reach the church.

=== Modern Era ===
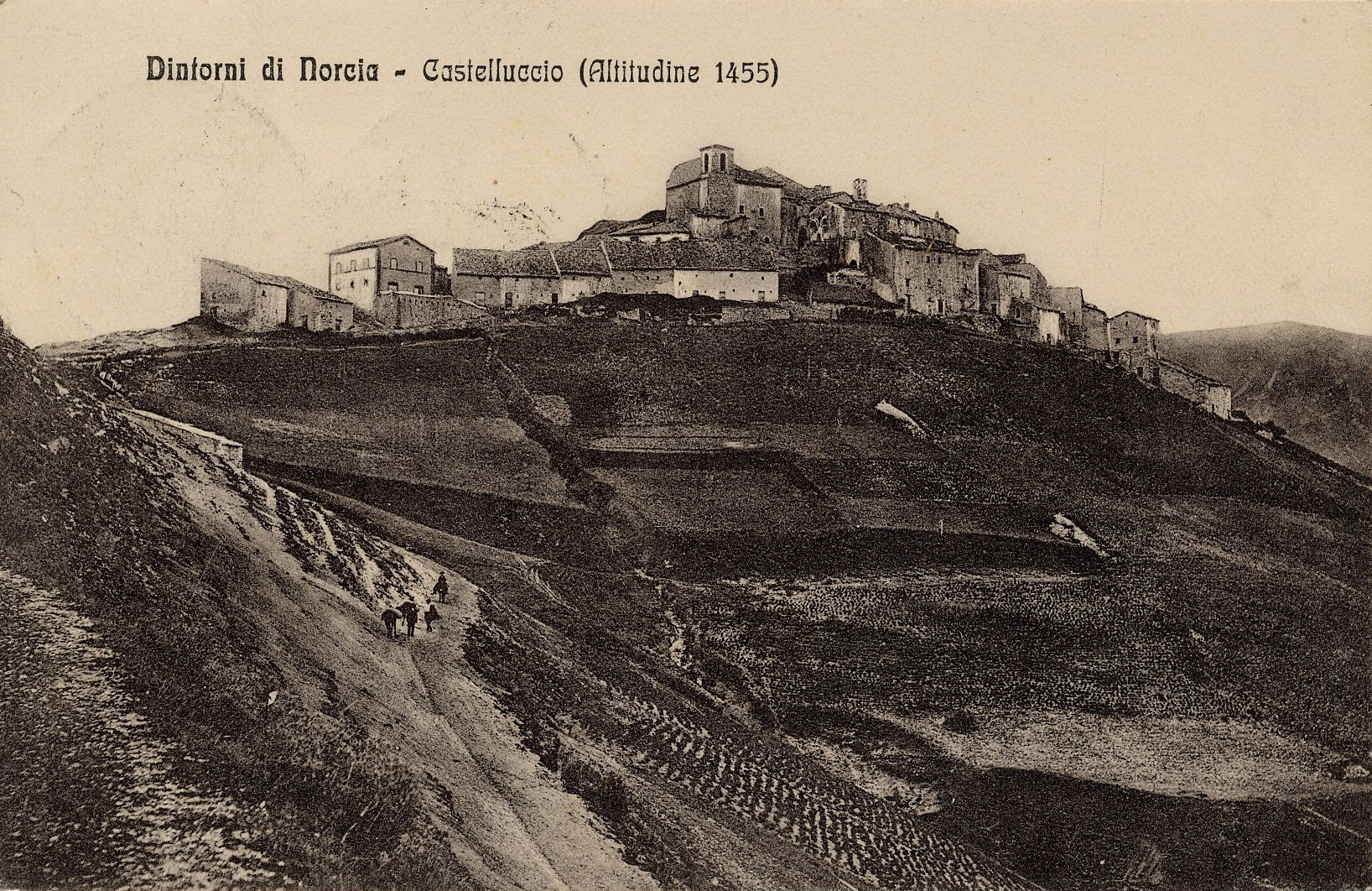
Castelluccio in 1911

In 1799, during the French invasion of central Italy, Castelluccio was the site of a violent battle between French forces and insurgents. French regular troops, supported by a civic detachment from Foligno, defeated local insurgent forces. The conflict left the area as a battlefield.

Until the early 19th century, Castelluccio functioned largely as a seasonal settlement. In winter, its inhabitants traditionally descended to Norcia, where they are said to have occupied the upper quarter known as Capo la Terra. This custom was abandoned and the population began remaining in the village year-round despite the severe climate. Despite this, transhumance remained important, with residents seasonally migrating with their flocks to the Roman Campagna, while women remained behind to tend the dwellings.

Life in Castelluccio was marked by prolonged isolation. Snow could begin as early as late August or early September and remain for as long as eight months, accumulating to such depths that access routes were blocked and covered passages had to be dug between houses. In periods of dense fog the church bells were rung continuously to guide lost travelers to safety. Postal service from Norcia was frequently interrupted for weeks at a time, leaving the village effectively cut off from the outside world during winter.

In 1836, Castelluccio is listed as an appodiato (dependent settlement) of Norcia, falling under the Diocese of Norcia and the Delegation of Spoleto. At the time, it had a recorded population of 456 inhabitants. It was regarded at the time as the highest village within the Papal States.

In the mid-19th century Castelluccio had a population of 515 inhabitants, with all but 12 individuals residing within the settlement. The community was then described as lacking in wheat, wine, maize, and fruit.

In the 1920s, the village had roughly 500 inhabitants living in compact, tightly clustered houses adapted to harsh alpine conditions, particularly heavy snow.

In February 1963, Castelluccio was isolated by severe winter weather, prompting a helicopter to be dispatched for relief operations. During one of the flights the aircraft caught fire, and the crew sustained serious injuries.

=== 21st century ===
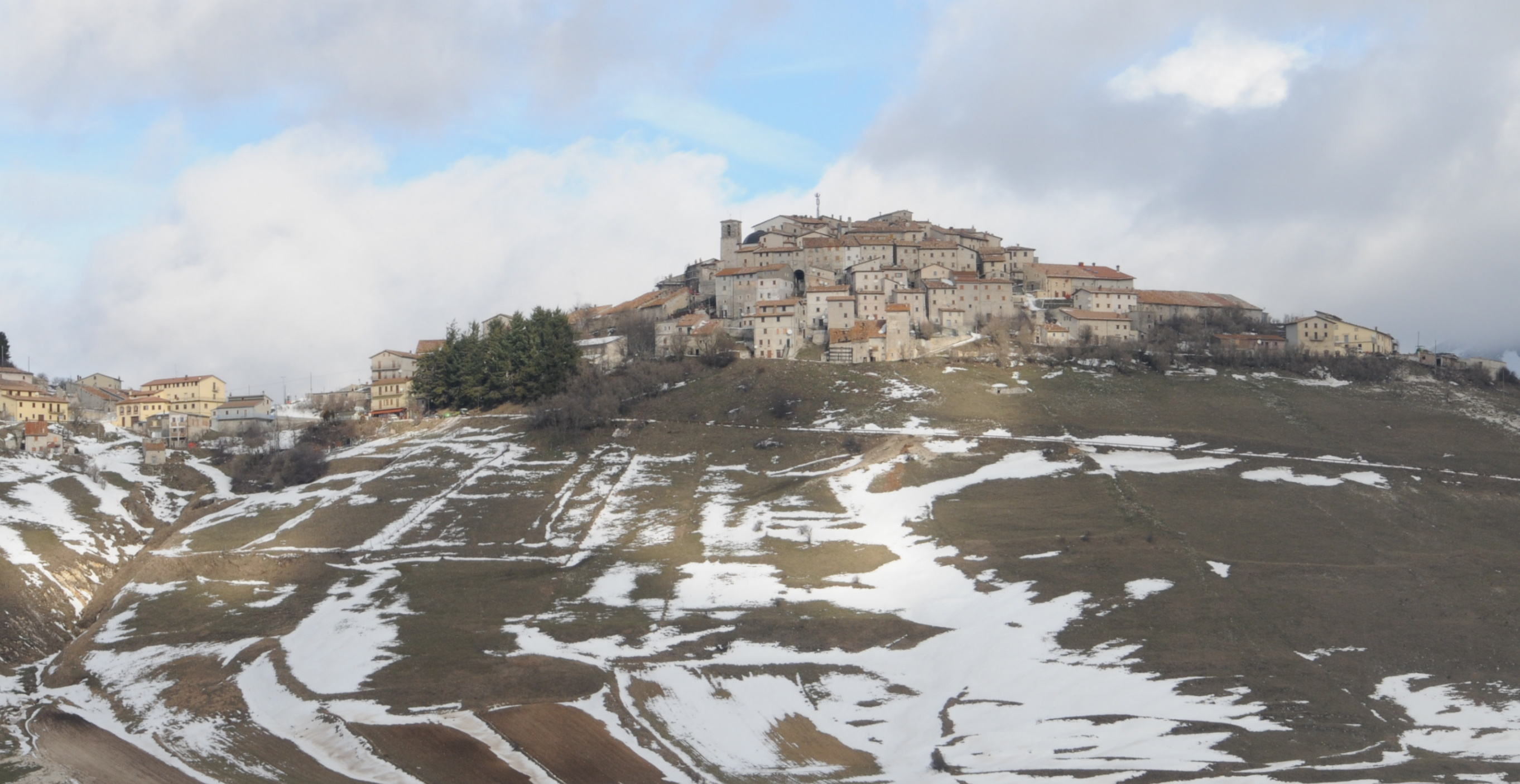
Castelluccio in 2012

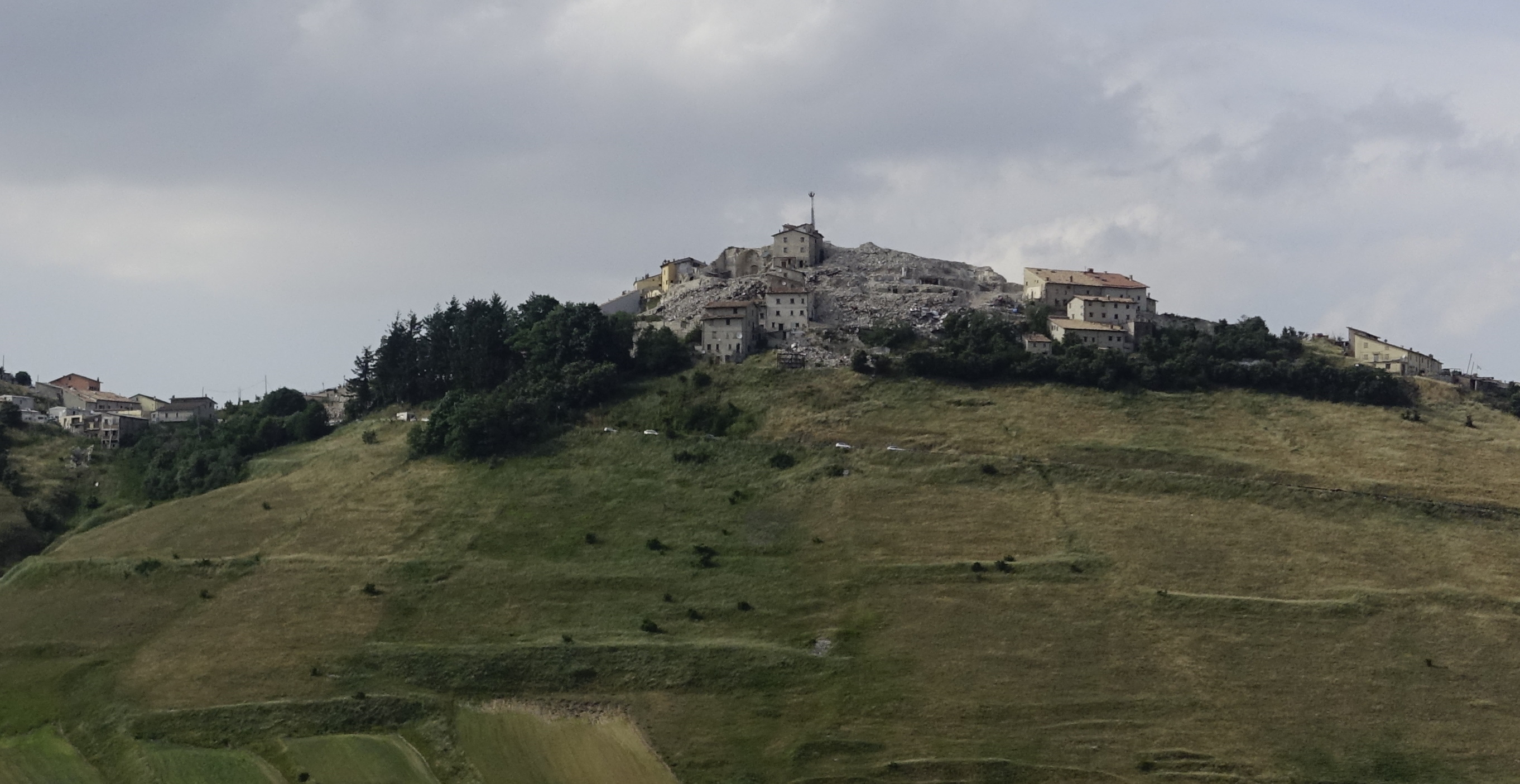
Castelluccio in 2019, after the earthquakes

Castelluccio was severely affected by earthquakes in 2016 and 2017. On 24 August 2016, the August 2016 Central Italy earthquake caused severe damage to the village, including the collapse of its two bell towers. The earthquake of 30 October 2016 especially devastated the settlement, with about 60% of the historic settlement collapsing. The church of Santa Maria dell'Assunta was destroyed.

As of October 2024, reconstruction in Castelluccio remained largely incomplete. In July 2025, the village was still described as largely in ruins, with most of the buildings reduced to debris and replaced by temporary housing structures, and with road access frequently disrupted.

Preliminary reconstruction works had begun by late 2024, with completion projected for 2028, at an estimated cost of about €60 million.

== Geography ==
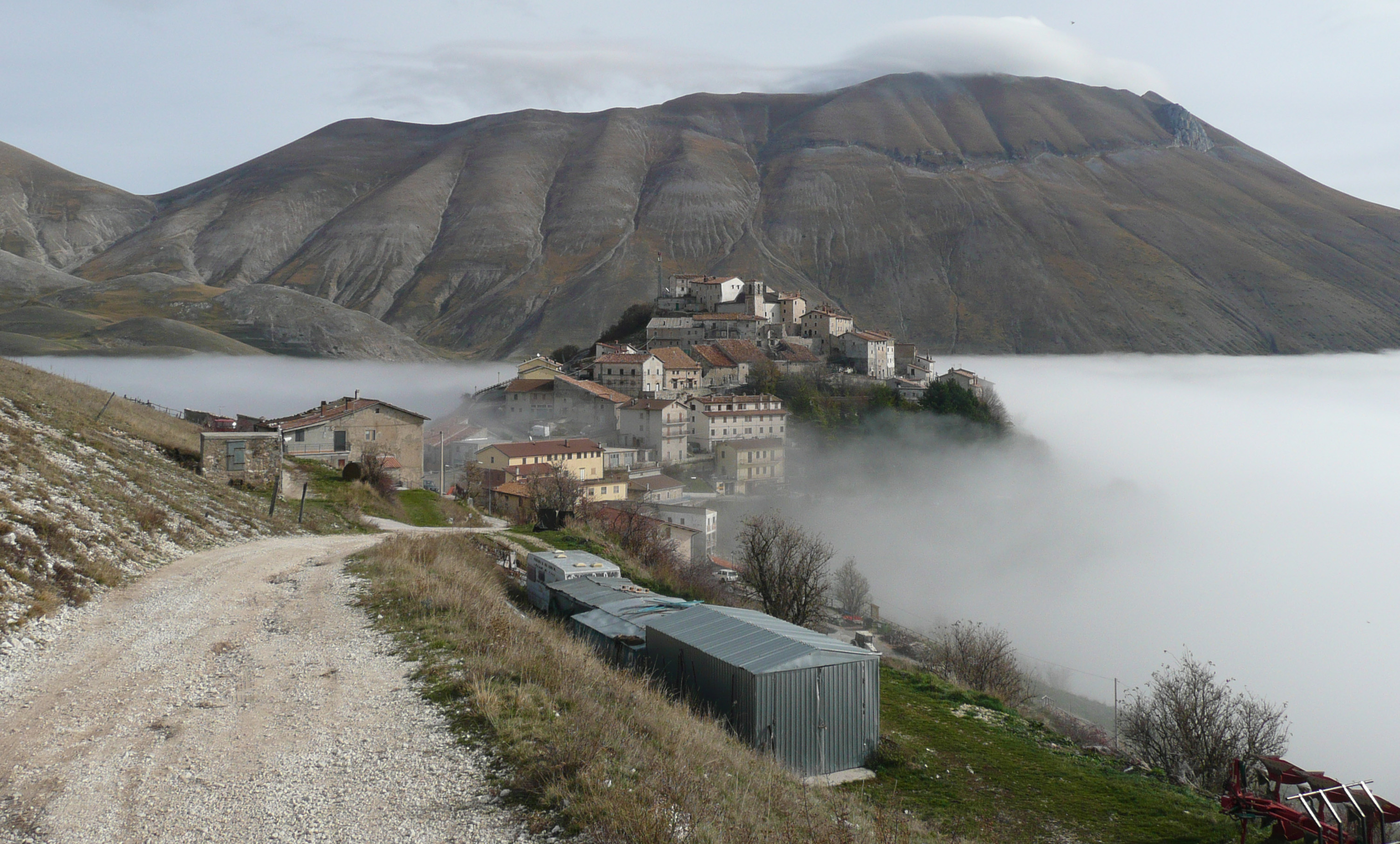
Castelluccio from the west in 2008, with Monte Vettore in the background

Castelluccio is situated in the Apennines on a hill at the foot of the Sibillini Mountains, at an elevation of 1,452 metres (4,764 ft) above sea level. The climate is described as very harsh.

Castelluccio overlooks the Piano Grande, and its existence was historically closely tied to this high karst plateau used for haymaking and seasonal pasturage. Piano Grande is an extensive plain of about 40 miles (64 km) in circumference, enclosed by a ring of mountains. It is partly used for pasture, partly for meadows, and partly for cultivation.

The area is rich in natural vegetation, and after winter the plain becomes covered with spontaneous flowers and lush grasses, supporting herds of horses, cattle, sheep, and pigs. In November, however, the area is covered by snow, and routes such as the pass of Forca toward Arquata del Tronto include a steep ravine known as the Fosso dell'Inferno leading toward Norcia.

A distinctive feature of the landscape is a conifer plantation shaped like Italy, created in 1961 to mark the centenary of Italian unification.

=== Climate ===
Climate data for Castelluccio di Norcia
Month	Jan	Feb	Mar	Apr	May	Jun	Jul	Aug	Sep	Oct	Nov	Dec	Year
Mean daily maximum °C (°F)	6.3 (43.3)	7.3 (45.1)	10.8 (51.4)	14.2 (57.6)	18.8 (65.8)	23.0 (73.4)	25.9 (78.6)	26.3 (79.3)	21.4 (70.5)	17.1 (62.8)	11.7 (53.1)	7.3 (45.1)	15.8 (60.4)
Mean daily minimum °C (°F)	−1.5 (29.3)	−1.8 (28.8)	1.1 (34.0)	4.0 (39.2)	8.3 (46.9)	12.1 (53.8)	14.6 (58.3)	14.9 (58.8)	10.9 (51.6)	7.5 (45.5)	3.5 (38.3)	−0.5 (31.1)	6.9 (44.4)
Average precipitation mm (inches)	78.8 (3.10)	87.3 (3.44)	101.7 (4.00)	119.2 (4.69)	115.4 (4.54)	92.0 (3.62)	70.7 (2.78)	67.3 (2.65)	98.5 (3.88)	87.2 (3.43)	108.7 (4.28)	100.9 (3.97)	1,127.7 (44.40)
Mean monthly sunshine hours	124.0	109.0	132.0	144.0	198.0	216.0	286.0	254.0	198.0	161.0	92.0	93.0	2,007
Source: World Weather & Climate Information

== Demographics ==
Historical population
Year	Pop.	±% p.a.
1701	212	—
1736	240	+0.36%
1853	515	+0.65%
1901	500	−0.06%
1951	596	+0.35%
1981	292	−2.35%
2001	150	−3.28%
2021	101	−1.96%

In the Papal census of 1701 the settlement, then known as Monte Precino, had a population of 212, rising to 240 by 1736. By 1853 it had grown further to 515 inhabitants living in 113 households.

In the Italian census of 1901, 500 inhabitants were registered, of whom 351 were present in the village on 10 February of that year. By 1951 the population had reached 596, all residing within the town and none in the surrounding countryside.

Thereafter the population declined steadily, falling to 292 in 1981, 150 in 2001, and 101 by 2021.

== Economy ==
The economy of Castelluccio is primarily based on agriculture and pastoralism, with the cultivation of lentils holding particular importance. The local lentil, recognized with Protected Geographical Indication status, represents the principal agricultural product of the area. The surrounding plain also support extensive grazing, particularly in the warmer seasons.

Seasonal tourism also plays a significant role. Castelluccio stands within the territory of the Monti Sibillini National Park. Seasonal tourism occurs in both winter and summer, driven respectively by snow activities and hiking, as well as to the flowering of the plateau, which attracts large numbers of visitors each year. The landscape also supports activities such as paragliding and hang gliding, drawing enthusiasts from across Europe.

Following the 2016 earthquakes, much of the built-up area was severely damaged, leaving only a limited number of hospitality establishments in operation, including agritourism facilities and a hotel-restaurant.

The local economy in the 19th century was likewise based primarily on pastoralism and limited agriculture. Only limited crops were grown, including barley, rye, roveja, and lentils. Due to scarcity of essential crops, many inhabitants lived in poor conditions, and most shepherds migrated seasonally to the Maremma during the winter months.

== Religion and culture ==
=== Religious buildings ===
The village contained two churches. The church of Santa Maria dell'Assunta, dating to the 16th century, was built with a Greek-cross plan and a dome supported by four arches. Its main altar was made of gilded walnut and included a large crucifix and statues of Saint Emidio and Saint Michael the Archangel. To the right stood an altar with a seated, gilded statue of the Madonna within a stone niche, while opposite was an altar with a statue of Saint Anthony Abbot.

The Church of Santa Maria Assunta was destroyed in the earthquake of October 2016. In 2018, during post-earthquake recovery work, a cache of religious objects was discovered in the ruins of the church, including terracotta figures of the Magi and 18th-century liturgical objects.

The other church was dedicated to the Most Holy Sacrament and was connected to the residence of the parish priest.

The principal local festival is that of the Assumption.

=== Culture ===
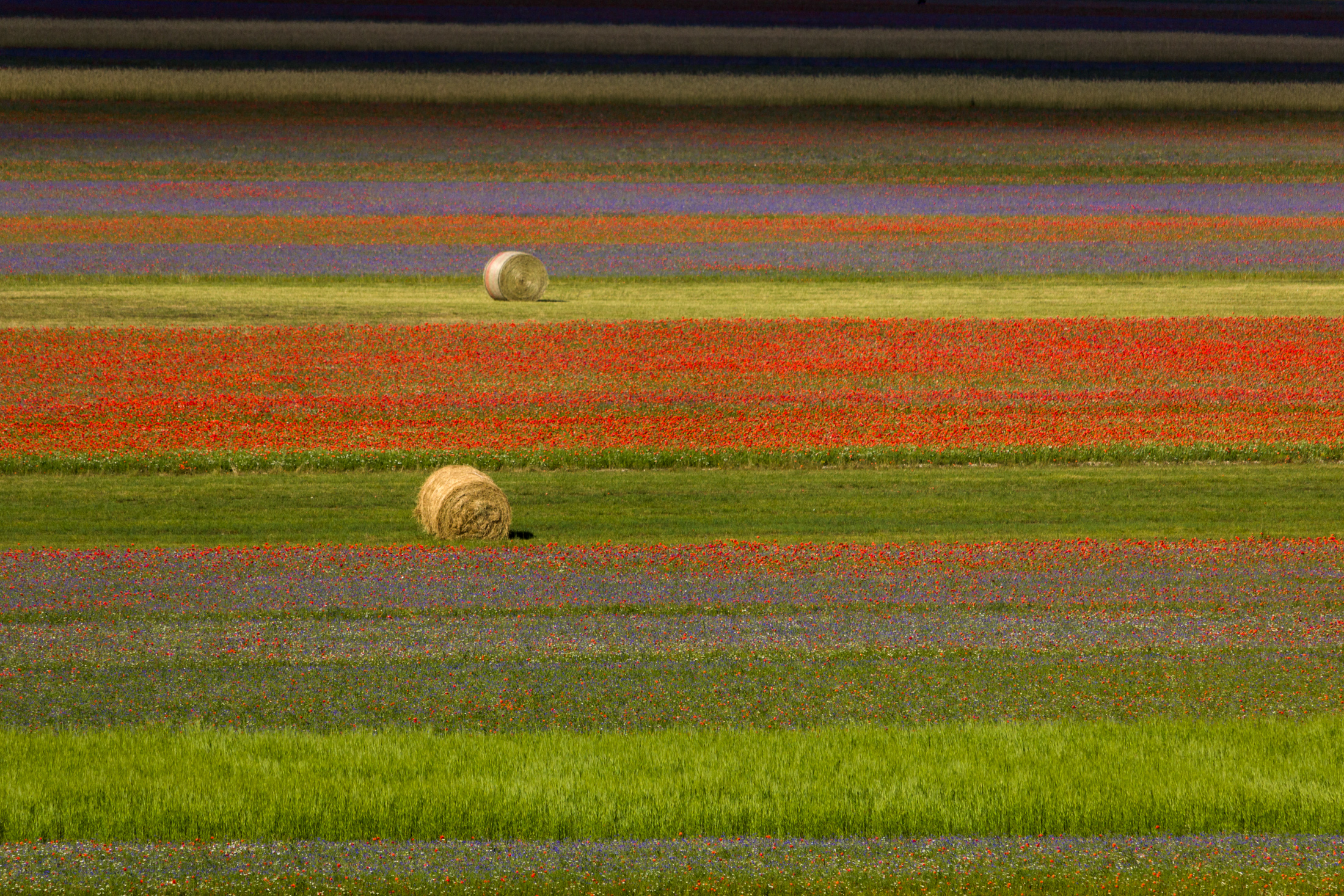
The Fioritura, seasonal flowering of the Castelluccio plateau

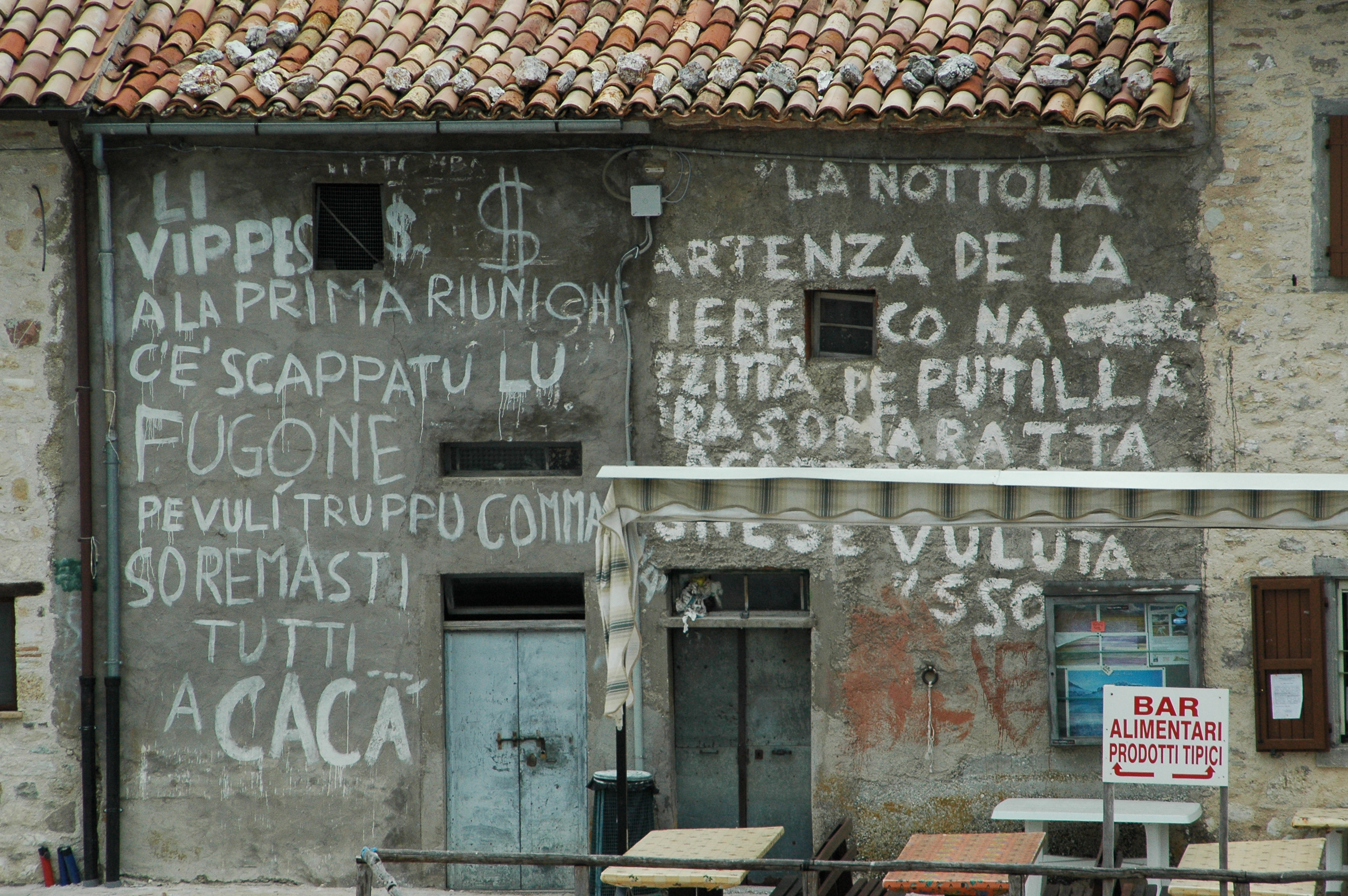
Wall inscriptions in the local dialect, 2008

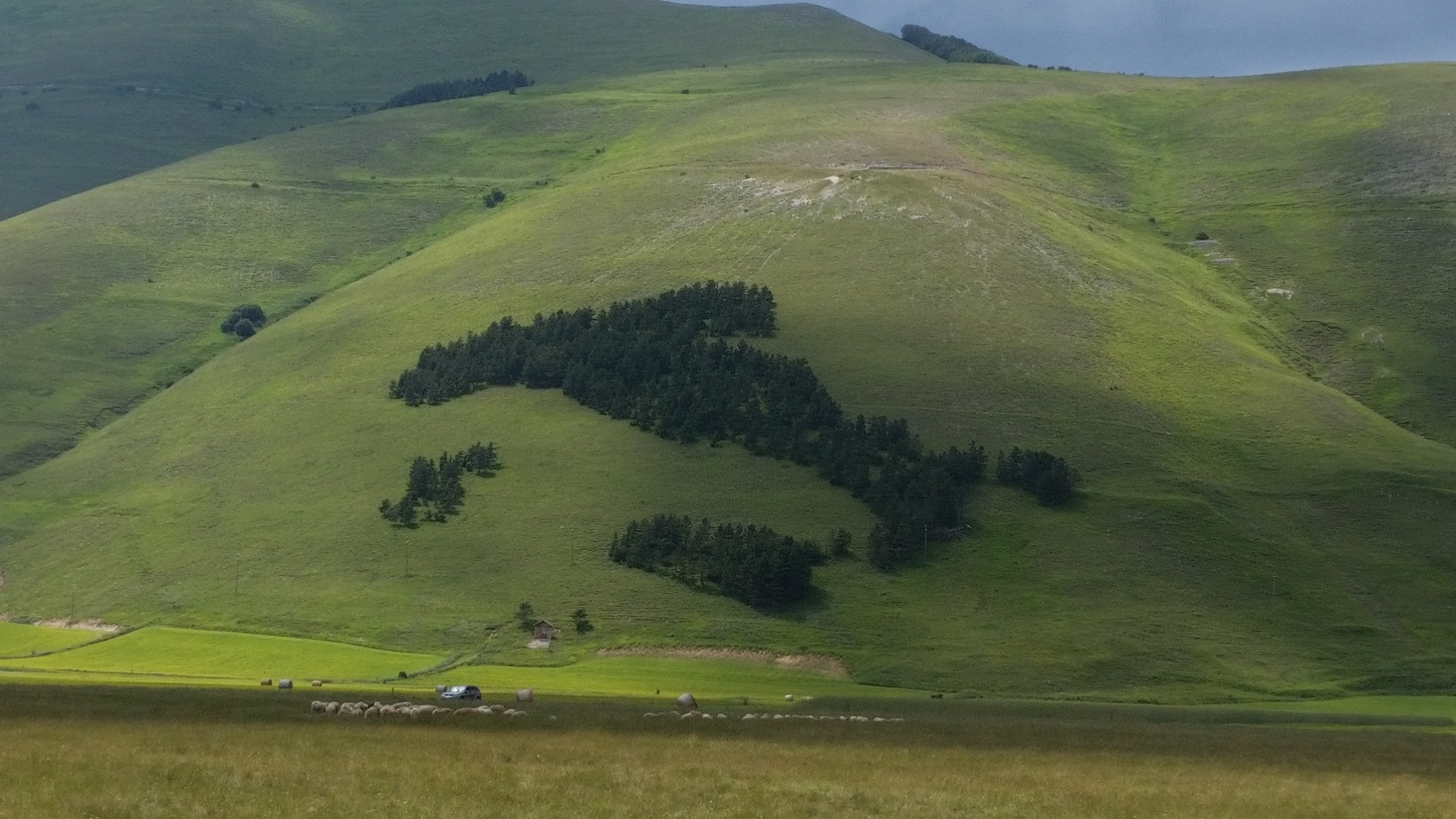
Bosco Italia

Castelluccio is known for the Fioritura, an event celebrating the arrival of the summer season, when the plateau surrounding the village becomes covered with flowers of many different colors.

The village appears in the late medieval romance Il Guerrin Meschino by Andrea da Barberino as a castle at the foot of Monte Sibilla, where the hero stops before ascending toward the cave.

A distinctive cultural practice consists of rhymed inscriptions painted on house walls in the local dialect. These writings, created at night by young inhabitants, were used to communicate events, gossip or social commentary to the community.
