= Ricks Spring =

Karst spring in Utah, USA

Coordinates: 41°50′38″N 111°35′33″W

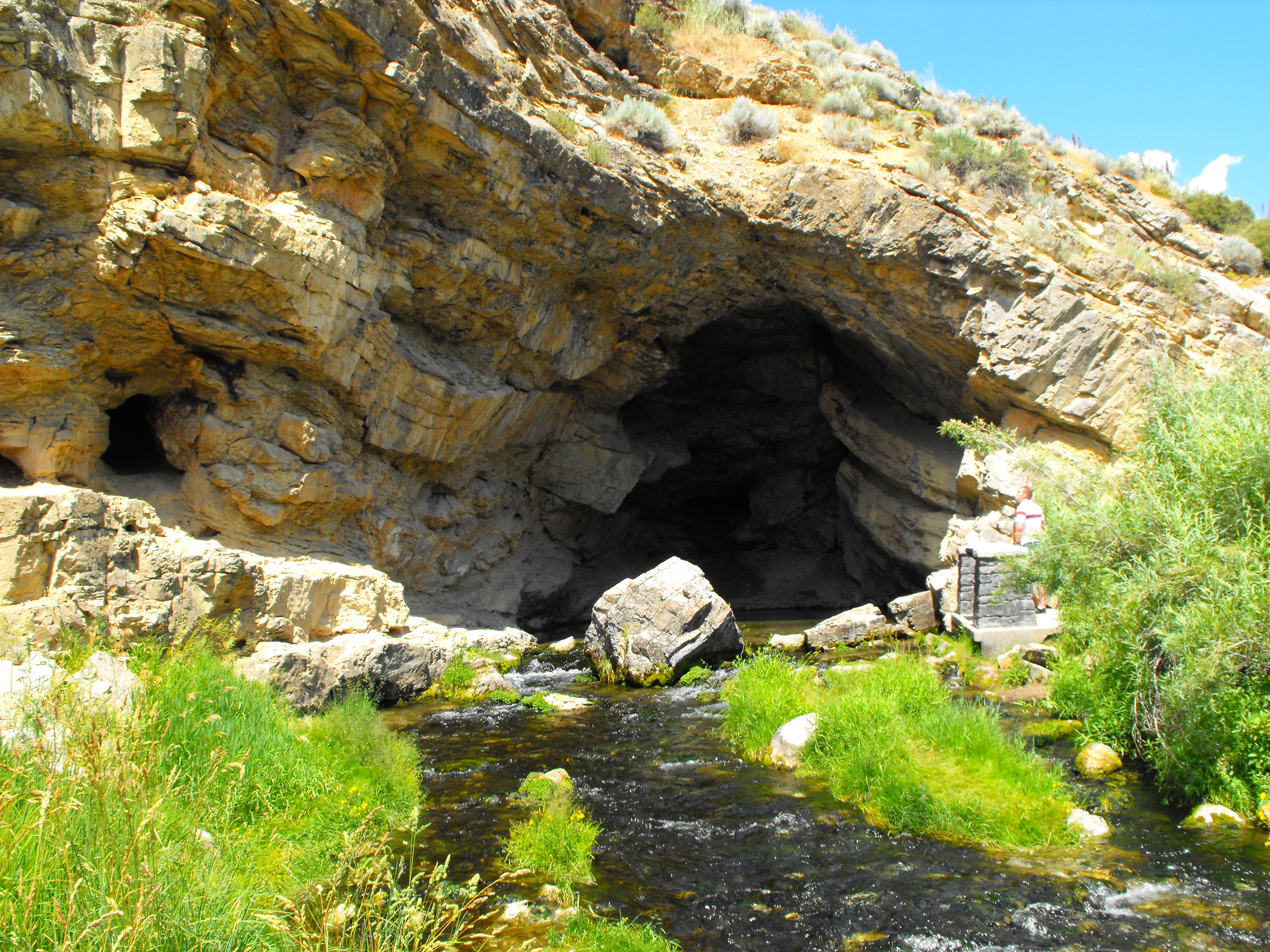
The cave and outflow of Ricks Spring in mid-summer

Ricks Spring is a karst spring, a natural water outflow from a cave in Logan Canyon within the Wasatch-Cache National Forest in northeast Utah. The spring is not an artesian source, but comes from the Logan River. Ricks Spring is the best known of several springs in an underground water network of the area.

== History ==
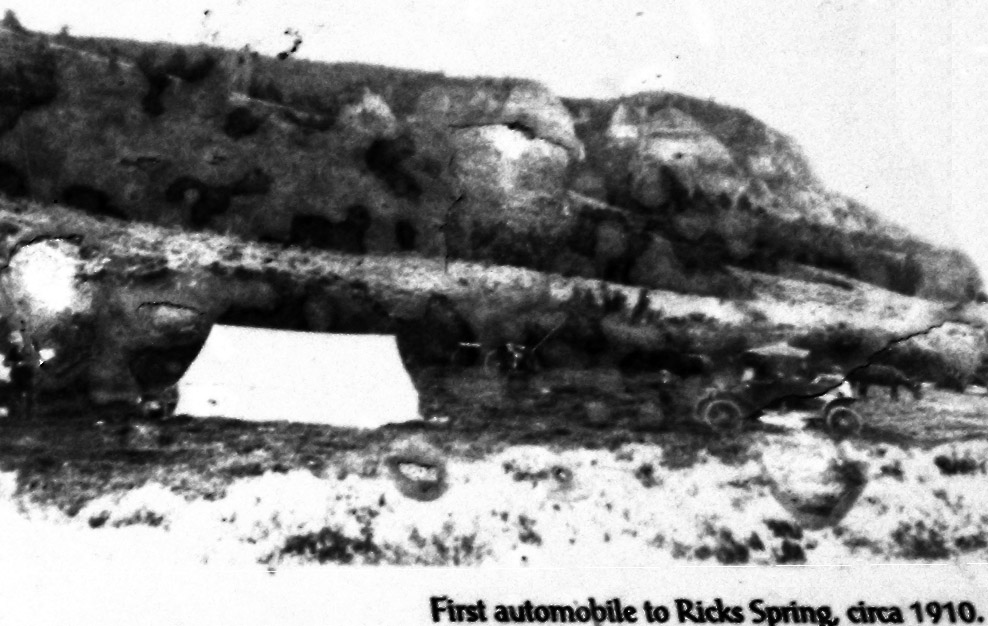
The first automobile to travel the road to Ricks Spring, circa 1910

Thomas E. Ricks settled in the nearby Cache Valley in 1859. Logan Canyon was an area rich with timber and other resources for nearby settlements, his explorations of which being some of the first documentations of the area. At the recommendation of Brigham Young, Ricks and others in the community began constructing a road to Bear Lake Valley. The road to Ricks Spring was the first section to be completed before winter, and within a decade, the area became a popular excursion point for camping and automobiling. The road is now part of the Logan Canyon Scenic Byway, part of US Route 89.

== Hydrology ==
Since its discovery, people visiting the spring often drank from it, bringing home jugs and barrels of the "fresh spring water" under the assumption it came from a deep aquifer. They often became sick with giardia indicating the water was not from an artesian source. In the 1950s hydrogeologists noticed a pattern between the flows of the Logan River and theorized a connection between them. In 1972, a severe winter froze the river, jamming it in some locations causing water to fill upstream. Ricks Spring began to flow early that year, and then subsided when the river level dropped again confirming the link between the river and the spring. Later that summer dye tracing was used in the Logan River and the dye was found in Ricks Spring, confirming the water source of the spring.

Further dye tracing found that the Logan River is not the only source for Ricks Spring. Several minor streams, located as far as five miles away, and up to 2600 feet higher in elevation, also feed into the underground network that feeds Ricks Spring. Water from Tony Grove Lake also contributes to Ricks Spring.

Ricks Spring is only the most well known of several springs in the Logan Canyon area. The other springs, Dewitt Spring, Wood Camp Hollow Spring, Logan Cave Spring, and Benchmark Spring, all have water sources that overlap with at least one of the other springs. Dewitt Spring is a water source for the city of Logan, the other springs, including Ricks Spring all recharge the Logan River.

== Geology ==
The local rock is made up of sedimentary layers. Pressure and earthquakes have caused the rock to fold and fracture exposing weak points. Over time water flowing through these points eroded through the limestone creating a path from the river and other inflows at high elevation to flow and emit from the spring.

There are two caves at Ricks Spring. An above water cave extends into the rock about 25 feet. The second cave is an extensive network of both wet and dry passages that is only accessible by cave diving. As of 2009, it has been explored to about 2200 feet.
