= Newsome Sinks Karst Area =

Karst formation in Alabama

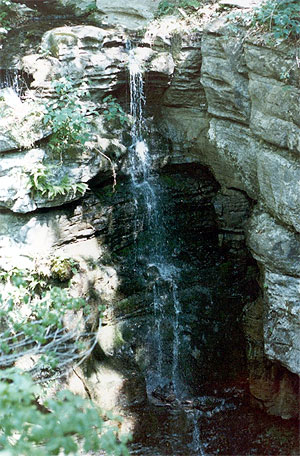

- Location within Alabama
- Location: Morgan County, Alabama
- Coordinates: 34°26′27″N 86°35′50″W
- Area: 9,925 acres (4,017 ha); NNL 1,700 acres (690 ha)

U.S. National Natural Landmark
- Designated: November 1973

Newsome Sinks Karst Area is a privately owned karst formation in Morgan County, Alabama. It was listed as a National Natural Landmark in November 1973.

== Description ==
The valley was named for William Newsome who settled in the area in 1838. It is approximately 4 miles (6.4 km) long and up to .75 miles (1.21 km) wide. The NNL covers 1,700 acres (690 ha), but the total karst area is around 9,925 acres (4,017 ha). There are more than forty caves in the region extending almost 9.5 miles (15.3 km) and up to 400 feet (120 m) deep. The land is part of the Cotaco Creek watershed. The underlying rock is Bangor Limestone formed in the Mississippian Age.

There are over 15 rare species in the area, such as the southern cavefish, gray bat, Indiana bat, American Hart's-tongue fern and Tennessee bladderfern.

During the American Civil War, saltpeter was mined to make gunpowder here, and the Confederates had a leather tanning operation until it was destroyed by Union forces.
