= List of Australian Aboriginal group names =

Listing Australian Aboriginal groups

This list of Australian Aboriginal group names includes names and collective designations which have been applied, either currently or in the past, to groups of Aboriginal Australians. The list does not include Torres Strait Islander peoples, who are ethnically, culturally and linguistically distinct from Australian Aboriginal peoples, although also an Indigenous Australian people.

Typically, Aboriginal Australian mobs are differentiated by language groups. Most Aboriginal people could name a number of groups of which they are members, each group being defined in terms of different criteria and often with much overlap. Many of the names listed below are properly understood as language or dialect names; some are simply the word meaning man or person in the associated language; some are endonyms (the name as used by the people themselves) and some exonyms (names used by one group for another, and not by that group itself), while others are demonyms (terms for people from specific geographical areas).

== List ==
Language groups	Alternative names or component (sub-)groups	Geographical location	AIATSIS region
A
Alawa^{[1]}^{[2]}	Alaua, Allawa, Allaua, Allua, Allowa, Alowa, Leealowa, Kalawa, Kallaua, Allowiri, Allaura, Galleewo	Northern Territory	Desert
Alura^{[2]}	Allura Alura, Hallura, Nallura, Jaminjung, lillup	Northern Territory	
Alyawarre^{[1]}	Iliaura,^{[2]} Illiaura, Iljaura, Ilyaura, Ilyowra Illyowra, Illura, Aliawara, Alyawara, Alyawarra, Ilawara, Jaljuwara, Yalyuwara, Alyawarr	Northern Territory	Desert
Amangu^{[1]}^{[2]}	Emangu, Amandyo, Ying, Champion Bay, Geraldton	Western Australia	Southwest
Amarak^{[1]}^{[2]}	Amarag, Amuruk, Amurag, Amurrak, Ngamurak, Ngamurag, Umuriu, Umoreo	Northern Territory	
Amijangal^{[2]}	Ami, Amijangal	Northern Territory	
Anēwan^{[2]}	Anaywan, Anewan, Nowan, Enni-won, Yenniwon, Ee-na-won, En-nee-win, Eneewin, Inuwan, Inuwon, Neeinuwon, Enuin, Nganyayawana^{[1]}	New South Wales	Southeast
Andakerebina^{[2]}	Antakiripina, Undejerebina, Andeberegina, Walwallie, Wally, Andakerebina, Andegerebenha^{[1]}	Northern Territory	Desert
Adnyamathanha^{[1]}	Kuyani, Wailpi, Yadliaura and Pangkala^{[2]}	South Australia	Spencer
Ankamuti^{[2]}	Goomkoding, Yukamakundji, Amkomti, Ondaima, Oiyamkwi, Apukwi, Anggamudi^{[1]}	Queensland	West Cape
Anmatyerre^{[1]}	Nmatjera, Unmatjera, Inmatjera, Anmatjara, Urmitchee, Janmadjara, Janmatjiri, Yanmedjara, Yandmadjari, Anmatjera^{[2]}	Northern Territory	Desert
Antakirinja^{[1]}^{[2]}	Antakerinya, Antakerrinya, Andagirinja, Andagarinja, Andekerinja, Andegilliga, Andigirinji Antingari, Andigari Anjirigna, Andgari Antigari, Antegarina, Unterregerrie, Ngonde, Tangara, Yandairunga, Njuntundjara, Andagerinja Antekerrepinhe Andergerebenha, Aluna, Andigerinya Antekarinya Antikirinya	South Australia	Desert
Araba^{[2]}	Arap, Aripa, Ngariba	Queensland	
Arabana^{[1]}^{[2]}	Ngarabana, Arabuna Arrabunna, Arrabonna, Arubbinna, Arapina, Arapani, Urapuna Urabuna, Urabunna Urroban, Wangarabana, Wongkurapuna, Wangarabunna, Jendakarangu, Nulla, Yendakarangu, Peake, Anna	South Australia	Eyre
Arakwal^{[2]}	Arakwal, Naiang, Cool-al, Kahwul, Njung, Nyung, Lismore, Kogung, Yawkum-yore, Jawjumeri	New South Wales	
Arrernte^{[1]}	Aranda,^{[2]} Aranta, Arrente, Arunda, Arunta, Arranda, Arinta, Arrinda, Urrundie, Herinda, Arrundta, Wonggaranda, Urrundie, Ilpma, Ulpma, Paroola, Wongkatjeri	Central Australia	Desert
Arnga^{[2]}	Woljamidi, Woljamiri, Molyamidi, Kuluwara, Kuluwaran, Guluwarin, Kolaia, Arawari, Arawodi	Western Australia	
Atjinuri^{[2]}	Adjinadi, Itinadjana, Itinadyana, Itinadyand, Nedgulada, Imatjana	Queensland	
Awabakal^{[1]}^{[2]}	Awabakal, Awaba, Awabagal, Lake Macquarie, Newcastle, Kuringgai, Ninyowa, Kuri	New South Wales	Southeast
Awarai^{[2]}	Warai, Warei, Warrai, Awarrai, Awarra	Northern Territory	
Awinmul^{[2]}	Awinnmull Awinmul, Awinmil	Northern Territory	
Awngthim^{[1]}		Queensland	West Cape
Ayabakan^{[2]}	Aiabakan, Bakanu, Baganu, Bakanh^{[1]}	Queensland	West Cape
Ayapathu^{[2]}	Aiabadu, Aiyabotpoo, Jabuda, Koka Ai-ebadu, Aiebadu, Koko Aiebadu, Kikahiabilo, Bakanh	Queensland	
B
Badjalang^{[2]}	Badjalang, Buggul, Bandjalang, Widje, Woomargou, Bundjalung^{[1]}	Queensland / New South Wales	Southeast
Badjiri^{[2]}	Badjidi, Badjeri, Baddyeri, Byierri, Baderi, Poidgerry, Badjedi, Budjari,^{[1]} Poidgerryygbadhje	Queensland	Riverine
Baiali^{[2]}	Byellee, Bieli, Byellel, Orambul, Urambal, Bayali^{[1]}	Queensland	Northeast
Baiyungu^{[2]}	Baijungo Baijungu, Baiong, Baiung, Biong, Paiunggu, Bayungu, Palyungu, Payungu^{[1]}	Western Australia	Northwest
Bailgu^{[2]}	Bailko Bailgu, Pailgu, Pailgo, Baljgu, Balju, Palgu, Bailju, Bailgo, Balgu, Boolgoo, Pulgoe, Mangguldulkara, Paljarri, Palyku, Palku^{[1]}	Western Australia	Northwest
Bakanambia^{[2]}	Wanbara, Wambara, Lamalama, Mukinna,	Princess Charlotte Bay, Queensland	
Balardong^{[2]}	Balardung^{[1]}	Western Australia	Southwest
Banbai^{[2]}	Banbai, Bahnbi, Athnbi, Gumbaynggirr	New South Wales	
Bandjigali		New South Wales	Riverine
Bandjin^{[2]}		Queensland	
Barada^{[2]}	Baradha^{[1]}	Queensland	Northeast
Baranbinja^{[2]}	Baranbinja, Barren-binya, Parran-binye, Burranbinya, Burrunbinya, Barrumbinya, Burranbinga, Burrabinya, Barranbinya^{[1]}	New South Wales	Riverine
Barababaraba,^{[2]}	Baraparapa, Burrabura-ba, Baraba-baraba, Barraba-barraba, Bareber, Burrappa, Burrapper, Bureba, Burabura, Boora-boora, Burapper, Boort, Baraba Baraba^{[1]}	New South Wales	Riverine
Barbaram^{[2]}	Mbabaram^{[1]}	Queensland	Rainforest
Badimaya^{[2]}	Barimaia^{[1]}	Western Australia	Southwest
Bardi^{[2]}	Bad, Bard, Barda, Baada, Baardi^{[1]}	Western Australia	Kimberley
Barindji^{[1]}^{[2]}	Barrengee, Beriait, Berri-ait, Paur, Paroo, Bpaaroo, Bpaaroon-je	New South Wales	Riverine
Barkindji^{[1]}^{[2]}	Barkinji, Barkinjee, Barkunjee, Bahkunji, Pakindji, Bakindji, Bahkunjy, Parkungi, Parkengee, Parkingee, Bakandi, Bargunji, Kurnu, Wimbaja, Barkungee	New South Wales	Riverine
Barna^{[1]}^{[2]}		Queensland	Northeast
Barunggam^{[1]}^{[2]}		Queensland	Riverine
Barungguan^{[2]}		Queensland	
Batjala^{[2]}	Badtjala^{[1]}	Queensland	Southeast
Beriguruk^{[2]}	Perrigurruk, Eri, Erei, Beriguruk, Limilngan	Northern Territory	
Bidawal^{[2]}	Bidwell^{[1]}	Victoria	
Bidia^{[2]}	Birria^{[1]}	Queensland	Eyre
Bidjigal	Bediagal	New South Wales	
Bigambul^{[1]}^{[2]}		Queensland	Riverine
Bilingara^{[2]}	Bilinara,^{[1]} Bilinurra, Bilyanarra, Bilyanurra, Plinara, Pillenurra, Billianera, Bulinara, Bringara, Boonarra	Northern Territory	Fitzmaurice
Binbinga^{[1]}^{[2]}	Binbingha, Binbinka, Pinbinga, Leepitbinga, Bing Binga	Northern Territory	Gulf
Bindal^{[1]}^{[2]}		Queensland	Northeast
Bindjali		South Australia	Riverine
Bingongina^{[2]}	Bin-gongina, Bugongidja, Bingongina	Northern Territory	
Binigura^{[2]}	Pinikura^{[1]}	Western Australia	Northwest
Biria^{[2]}	Biri^{[1]}	Queensland	Northeast
Birpai^{[2]}	Birpai, Birripai, Birrpiri, Brippai, Bripi, Birrapee, Biripi^{[1]}	New South Wales	Northeast
Bitjara		Queensland	
Brabralung^{[2]}	Brabiralung, Brabuwooloong	Victoria	
Braiakaulung^{[2]}	Brayakuloong	Victoria	
Bratauolung^{[2]}	Bratowooloong	Victoria	
Bugulmara^{[2]}		Queensland	
Bukurnidja^{[1]}		Northern Territory	North
Buluwai^{[2]}		Queensland	
Bunganditj^{[2]}	Buandig^{[1]}	South Australia	Riverine
Bundjalung^{[2]}	Boonwurrung^{[1]}	New South Wales	Northeast
Bunurong^{[2]}	Boonwurrung^{[1]}	Victoria	Southeast
Burarra^{[1]}	Anbara, Marawuraba, Madia, Maringa, Gunadba Gunaidbe, Gidjingali, Barera, Barara,^{[2]} Baurera, Burera, Barea, Anbarra	Northern Territory	Arnhem
Buruna^{[2]}	Puruna^{[1]}	Western Australia	Northwest
Bwgcolman		Palm Island, Queensland	
D
Dadi Dadi^{[1]}	Tatitati^{[2]}	Victoria	
Daii^{[2]}	Taii, Tai, Dalwango, Dalwongu, Darlwongo, Dhalwangu, Djawark, Djarlwag	Northern Territory	
Dainggati^{[2]}	Djangadi, Dang-getti, Danghetti, Danggadi, Dhangatty, Thangatty, Thangatti, Dangati, Yuungai, Burugardi, Boorkutti, Nulla Nulla, Amberu, Himberrong, Jang, Daingatti, Dhan-Gadi, Dainggatti^{[1]}	New South Wales	Southeast
Dalabon^{[2]}	Buan, Buwan, Boun, Ngalkbon, Ngalkbun^{[1]}	Northern Territory	Arnhem
Dalla^{[2]}	Dalulinta (Indigenous group)	Queensland	
Dangbon^{[1]}^{[2]}	Gundangbon, Dangbun, Dangbar, Gumauwurk	Northern Territory	Arnhem
Danggali^{[1]}^{[2]}		South Australia	Riverine
Dangu^{[2]}	Yirgala, Yolngu	Northern Territory	
Darambal^{[2]}	Darumbal^{[1]}	Queensland	Northeast
Darkinjang^{[2]}	Darkinjang, Darginjang, Darkinung,^{[1]} Darknung	New South Wales	Southeast
Darug	Daruk,^{[2]} Dharruk, Dharrook, Darrook, Dharug,^{[1]} Broken Bay, Dharung	New South Wales	Southeast
Dharawal		Sutherland Shire NSW and formerly in the Berrima, New South Wales area	
Diakui^{[2]}	Dhiyakuy, Djikai, Jikai, Tchikai, Dijogoi	Northern Territory	
Dieri^{[2]}	Dieri	South Australia	Eyre
Djabugandji^{[1]}		Queensland	Rainforest
Djabugay	Djabugandji, Tjapukai	Kuranda, Queensland	
Djagaraga^{[2]}		Queensland	
Djakunda^{[2]}		Queensland	
Djalakuru^{[2]}	Jalakuru, Iwaidja^{[1]}	Northern Territory	Arnhem
Djamindjung^{[2]}	Tjamindjung, Kaminjung, Jaminjang, Djamunjun, Jaminjung,^{[1]} Djamundon, Djamadjong, Murinyuwen, Murinyuwan, Djamindjung	Northern Territory	Fitzmaurice
Djangu^{[2]}	Djanga	Northern Territory	
Djankun^{[2]}		Queensland	
Djargurd Wurrung^{[1]}		Victoria	Southeast
Djaru^{[2]}	Jaru^{[1]}	Western Australia	Desert
Dja Dja Wurrung		Bendigo area, Victoria	
Djerait^{[2]}	Tjerait, Cherait, Cherite, Sherait, Jeerite, Scherits, Tjiras, Tjerratj^{[1]}	Northern Territory	Fitzmaurice
Djerimanga^{[2]}	Djeramanga, Jermangel, Kanambre, Kolobre Waak, Wulna, Woolna,^{[1]} Woolnah, Woolner, Wulnar, Wolna, Woolua	Northern Territory	North
Djilamatang^{[2]}		Victoria	
Djinang^{[2]}	Jandjinang, Jandjinung, Jakaula, Yandisha, Yandjinung, Yandjining, Yandjinang, Djinnang Djinang, Djinhang, Milingimbi, Wulllakki, Wulaki, Ullaki, Wulagi, Balmbi, Balmawi, Barlmawi, Manjarngi, Manyarrngi, Munarngo Manarrngu	Northern Territory	
Djinba^{[2]}	Djimba, Jinba, Outjanbah, Gunalbingu, Ganalbwingu, Kurkamarnapia	Northern Territory	
Djirbalngan		Queensland	Rainforest
Djiru^{[2]}		Queensland	
Djirubal^{[2]}		Queensland	
Djiwali^{[1]}^{[2]}	Jirwali^{[1]}	Western Australia	Northwest
Djowei^{[2]}	Kumertuo, Djowei, Limilngan^{[1]}	Northern Territory	North
Djugun^{[2]}	Jukun^{[1]}	Western Australia	Kimberley
Doolboong^{[1]}		Northern Territory	Kimberley
Duduroa^{[2]}		Victoria	
Duulngari^{[2]}		Western Australia	
Dunghutti^{[2]}	Dhangadi, Boorkutti, Burgadi, Burugardi, Dainggati, Dainiguid, Dang-getti, Dangadi, Dangati, Danggadi, Danggetti, Danghetti, Dhangatty, Djaingadi, Nulla Nulla, Tang-gette, Tangetti, and Thangatti	New South Wales	Mid North Coast
Duwal^{[2]}	Duwal Dhuwal, Murngin, Wulamba, Yolngu, Miwuyt, Balamumu, Barlamomo, Malag, Marlark, Arrawiya, Banjarrpuma, Bilmandji Dhurili, Durilji	Northern Territory	
Duwala^{[2]}	Duala Duwala, Murngin, Wulamba	Northern Territory	
E
Eora^{[1]}^{[2]}	Eo-ra, Ea-ora, Iora, Yo-ra, Kameraigal, Camera-gal, Cammera, Gweagal, Botany Bay Tribe, Bedia-mangora, Gouia-gul, Wanuwangul, Cadigal, Gadigal, Kadigal	Sydney	Southeast
Erawirung^{[2]}		South Australia	
Ewamin^{[2]}	Agwamin^{[1]}	Queensland	Gulf
G
Gaari^{[2]}	Gari Gaari, Iwaidja	Northern Territory	
Gadjalivia^{[2]}	Gadjalivia Gajalivia, Gudjalibi, Gudalavia, Gudjaliba, Gadjalibi, Gadjalibir, Burara	Northern Territory	
Gambalang^{[2]}	Gunbalang,^{[1]} Gambalang, Gunbulan, Walang, Gunbalang	Northern Territory	Arnhem
Gandangara^{[2]}	Gandangara, Gundungurra,^{[1]} Gundungari, Gundanora, Gurragunga, Burragorang, Gundungurra	New South Wales	Southeast
Garrwa^{[1]}	Karawa, Garawa^{[2]}	Northern Territory	Gulf
Geawegal^{[1]}^{[2]}	Keawaikal, Geawagal, Geawa-gal, Garewagal, Gwea-gal	Sydney	Southeast
Gia^{[2]}	Giya^{[1]}	Queensland	Northeast
Giabal^{[2]}		Queensland	
Gkuthaarn^{[2]}	Khutant, Kareldi, Kutanda, possibly same as Garandi/Karundi/Karrandee	Queensland	Gulf
Goeng^{[2]}		Queensland	
Goenpul	Minjerribah	Queensland	South Stradbroke Island
Goreng Goreng	Gureng-Gurengn, Curang-Curang, Curang-gurang, Goeng Goonine, Goorang-Goorang, Goorang-goorang, Gurang, Gurang-Gurang, Gurang-gurang, Gurang, Gureng-Gureng, Gureng-gureng, Kooranga, Koreng-Koreng, Koreng-koreng, Koren, Korenggoreng^{[2]}	Queensland	
Gudjal	(Kutjala?)	Queensland	Northeast
Gugu-Badhun^{[1]}	(Kutjala?, Warungu?)	Queensland	Northeast
Gulidjan^{[1]}		Victoria	Southeast
Gulngai^{[2]}		Queensland	
Gunai	Ganai, Gunnai, Kurnai Koori, Kurnai^{[1]}^{[2]}	Gippsland, Victoria	Southeast
Gumbaynggirr^{[2]}	Gumbaynggirr, Wadjar	New South Wales	Mid North Coast
Gunavidji^{[2]}	Gunavidji Gunaviji, Gunawitji, Gunabidji, Gunabwidji, Gunjibidji, Witji, Gunibidji^{[1]}	Northern Territory	Arnhem
Gunditjmara^{[1]}^{[2]}	Gournditch-mara, Dhauwurd wurrung, Dhawurdwurrung, Djab Wurrung, Djabwurrung, Gundidjmara, Kilcarer Gundidj, Worn Gundidj (Warrnambool)	Victoria	Southeast
Gungorogone^{[2]}	Gungorogone Gungoragone, Gungorologni, Gungarawoni, Gungurulgungi, Gungurugoni^{[1]}	Northern Territory	Arnhem
Gubi Gubi^{[1]}^{[2]}	Kabi Kabi	Queensland	South East QLD
Gurindji		Northern Territory	
Guugu-Yimidhirr^{[1]}		Queensland	East
I
Idindji^{[2]}		Queensland	
Ilba^{[2]}	Yilba^{[1]}	Queensland	Northeast
Ildawongga^{[2]}		Western Australia	
Inawongga^{[2]}	Yinhawangka^{[1]}	Western Australia	Northwest
Indindji	Yidinji^{[1]}	Queensland	Rainforest
Indjibandi^{[2]}	Yindjibarndi^{[1]}	Western Australia	Northwest
Indjilandji^{[2]}	Indjilandji Indjilindji, Injilinji, Intjilatja	Northern Territory	
Inggarda^{[2]}	Yinggarda^{[1]}	Western Australia	Northwest
Ingura^{[2]}	Wanindilaugwa, Andiljaugwa, Andilyaugwa, Wani-Ndiljaugwa, En Indiljaugwa, Amakurupa, Andilagwa, Lamadalpu, Awarikpa, Warnindilyakwa^{[1]}	Northern Territory	Arnhem
Iningai^{[1]}^{[2]}		Queensland	Eyre
Irukandji^{[2]}	Yirrganydji, Irakanji, Yirkandji, Yirkanji, Yirgay, Yettkie (misreading), Illagona, Wongulli, Dungara, Tingaree, Dungarah, Dingal	Cairns, Queensland	
Ithu^{[2]}		Queensland	
Iwaidja^{[2]}	Jiwadja, Jiwadja, Juwudja, Iwajia, Iyi, Eiwaja, Eaewardja, Eaewarga, Uwaidja, Unalla, Limbakaraja, Limba-Karadjee, Iwaiji, Tarula	Northern Territory	
J
Jardwadjali^{[2]}	Jaadwa^{[1]} Jadawadjali	Victoria	Riverine
Jaako^{[2]}		Northern Territory	
Jaara^{[2]}	Djadjawurung^{[1]}	Victoria	Riverine
Jabirr Jabirr^{[2]}	Jabirrjabirr, Djaberadjabera,^{[1]} DjaberrDjaberr, Dyaberdyaber, Jabba Jabba	Western Australia	Kimberley
Jaburara^{[2]}	Jaburrara,^{[1]} Yaburara	Western Australia	Northwest
Jadira^{[2]}		Western Australia	
Jadliaura^{[2]}		South Australia	
Jagalingu^{[2]}	Yagalingu^{[1]}	Queensland	Northeast
Jagara^{[2]}		Queensland	
Jaitmathang^{[2]}	Jaitmatang^{[1]}	Victoria	Northeast
Jalanga^{[2]}	Yalarruga(?)^{[1]}	Queensland	Eyre
Jambina^{[2]}	Yambina^{[1]}	Queensland	Northeast
Jandruwanta^{[2]}	Yandruwandha^{[1]}	South Australia	Eyre
Jangaa^{[2]}	Yanga^{[1]}	Queensland	Gulf
Jangga^{[2]}		Queensland	Northeast
Janggal^{[2]}	Gananggalanda^{[1]}	Queensland	Gulf
Jangkundjara^{[2]}	Yankuntjatjara^{[1]}	South Australia	Desert
Jangman^{[2]}	Yangman^{[1]}	Northern Territory	Fitzmaurice
Janjula^{[2]}		Northern Territory	Gulf
Jardwadjali		Victoria	
Jarijari^{[2]}		Victoria	
Jarildekald^{[2]}		South Australia	
Jaroinga^{[2]}	Bularnu^{[1]}	Northern Territory	Desert
Jarowair^{[2]}		Queensland	
Jathaikana^{[2]}		Queensland	
Jaudjibaia^{[2]}		Western Australia	
Yauraworka^{[2]}	Yawrawarka^{[1]}	South Australia	Eyre
Jawi^{[2]}	Djawi, Djaui^{[1]}	Western Australia	Kimberley
Jawoyn^{[1]}	Tjauen, Djouan, Djauun, Jawin, Chau-an, Tweinbol, Adowen, Djawin, Djawun, Djauwung, Charmong, Djauan^{[2]}	Northern Territory	Fitzmaurice
Jawuru^{[2]}	Yawuru^{[1]}	Western Australia	Kimberley
Jeidji^{[2]}	Yiiji^{[1]}	Western Australia	Kimberley
Jeithi^{[2]}	Jeithi, Yeidthee, Pikkolatpan, Wiradjuri	New South Wales	
Jeljendi^{[2]}	Yarluyandi^{[1]}	South Australia	Eyre
Jeteneru^{[2]}		Queensland	
Jetimarala^{[2]}		Queensland	
Jiegara	Jiegera,^{[2]} Yiegara, Jeigir, Yegera, Youngai, Jungai	New South Wales	
Jilngali^{[2]}		Northern Territory	
Jiman^{[2]}	Yiman^{[1]}	Queensland	Northeast
Jinigudira^{[2]}		Western Australia	
Jinwum^{[2]}	Minwum^{[1]}	Queensland	West Cape
Jirandali^{[2]}	Yirandali^{[1]}	Queensland	Eyre
Jirjoront^{[2]}	Yir Yoront^{[1]}	Queensland	West Cape
Jitajita^{[2]}	Jitajita, Ita-ita, Ithi-ithi, Eethie-eethie, Eethee Ethee, Yetho, Yit-tha, Yitsa, Tjuop, Yitha Yitha^{[1]}	New South Wales	
Jokula^{[2]}	Ganggalida^{[1]}	Queensland	Gulf
Juat^{[2]}	Yuat^{[1]}	Western Australia	Southwest
Juipera^{[2]}	Yuwi^{[1]}	Queensland	Northeast
Jukambal^{[2]}	Jukambal, Jukambil, Yukambal, Yukambul, Yukambil, Yacambal, Yookumbul, Yookumbil, Yoocumbill, Ukumbil, Yookumble, Yoocomble, Ucumble, Yukumba	New South Wales	
Jukambe^{[2]}		Queensland	
Jukul^{[2]}		Northern Territory	
Julaolinja^{[2]}		Queensland	
Jumu^{[2]}		Northern Territory	
Junggor^{[2]}		Northern Territory	
Jungkurara^{[2]}		Queensland	
Jupagalk^{[2]}		Victoria	
Jupangati^{[2]}	Yupangathi^{[1]}	Queensland	West Cape
Juru^{[2]}	Yuru^{[1]}	Queensland	Northeast
K
Kaantju^{[1]}	Kaanju	Queensland	East
Kabalbara^{[2]}	Gabalbara^{[1]}	Queensland	Northeast
Kabikabi^{[2]}	Gubbi Gubbi^{[1]}	Queensland	Northeast
Kadjerong^{[1]}^{[2]}		Northern Territory	Kimberley
Kaiabara^{[2]}		Queensland	
Kaiadilt^{[2]}	Gayardilt^{[1]}	Queensland	Gulf
Kairi^{[2]}	Gayiri^{[1]}	Queensland	Northeast
Kaititja^{[2]}	Kaytej^{[1]}	Northern Territory	Desert
Kakadu^{[2]}	Gagudju^{[1]}	Northern Territory	North
Kalaako^{[2]}		Western Australia	
Kalali^{[2]}	Kullilla^{[1]}	Queensland	Eyre
Kalamaia^{[2]}	Kalaamaya^{[1]}	Western Australia	Southwest
Kalibal^{[2]}	Kalibal, Murwillumbah, Moorung-moobar	New South Wales	
Kalibamu^{[2]}		Queensland	
Kalkadunga^{[2]}	Kalkadoon,^{[1]} Kalkatungu, Kalkutungu, Galgadungu, Kalkutung, Galgaduun	Queensland	Eyre
Kambure^{[2]}	Gamberre^{[1]}	Western Australia	Kimberley
Kambuwal^{[2]}		Queensland	
Kamilaroi^{[1]}^{[2]}	Kamilarai, Kamilari, Kamilroi, Kamilrai, Kamularoi, Kaameelarrai, Komleroy, Gamilaroi, Kahmilaharoy, Kamilary, Gumilori Gummilroi Ghummilarai, Cumilri, Kimilari, Kamil, Comleroy, Camel Duahi, Yauan, Tjake, Gamilaraay, Goomeroi, Yuwaalaraay, Gamilaraay, Yorta Yorta	Northern New South Wales, South Western Queensland	
Kamor^{[2]}	(cf. Kamor language)	Northern Territory	
Kandju^{[2]}		Queensland	
Kaneang^{[2]}	Kaniyang^{[1]}	Western Australia	Southwest
Kangulu^{[2]}	Gangulu	Queensland	Northeast
Kanolu^{[2]}		Queensland	
Karadjari^{[2]}	Karajarri^{[1]}	Western Australia	Desert
Karaman^{[2]}		Northern Territory	
Karangpurru^{[1]}		Northern Territory	Fitzmaurice
Karanguru^{[2]}	Karangura^{[1]}	South Australia	Eyre
Karanja^{[2]}		Queensland	
Kareldi^{[2]}	Gkuthaarn/Kuthant^{[1]}, Kareldi, Kutanda, possibly Garandi/Karundi/Karrandee	Queensland	Gulf
Karendala^{[2]}		Queensland	
Karenggapa^{[1]}^{[2]}	Karengappa, Karrengappa, Kurengappa	New South Wales	Eyre
Kariara^{[2]}	Kariyarra^{[1]}	Western Australia	Northwest
Karingbal^{[2]}	Garingbal	Queensland	Northeast
Kartudjara^{[2]}	Mardu^{[1]}	Western Australia	Desert
Karuwali^{[1]}^{[2]}		Queensland	Eyre
Katubanut^{[2]}	Gadubanud^{[1]}	Victoria	Southeast
Kaurareg^{[2]}		Queensland	
Kaurna^{[1]}^{[2]}	Kaura (misprint), Coorna, Gaurna, Koornawarra, Nantuwara, Nantuwaru, Nganawara, Meljurna or Meyukattanna.	Adelaide	Spencer
Kawadji^{[2]}		Queensland	
Kawambarai^{[2]}	Kareingi, Karin, Kerinma, Karinma, Garengema, Garnghes, Kinenekinene, Kianigane, Keramin, Kemendok, Pintwa, Jungeegatchere	New South Wales	
Kayimai		Manly, New South Wales	
Kaytetye	Kartetye, Kartiji, Keytej, Katish	Northern Territory	
Keiadjara^{[2]}		Western Australia	
Keinjan^{[2]}		Queensland	
Keramai^{[2]}		Queensland	
Kirrae^{[2]}	Girai wurrung^{[1]}	Victoria	
Kitabal^{[2]}	Kidabal, Dijabal, Kitta-bool, Kitabool, Kitapul, Gidabul, Gidjoobal, Kuttibul, Noowidal	New South Wales	
Kitja^{[2]}	Kija^{[1]}	Western Australia	Kimberley
Koa^{[2]}	Guwa^{[1]}	Queensland	Eyre
Koamu^{[2]}	Kooma^{[1]}	Queensland	Riverine
Koara^{[2]}	Kuwarra^{[1]}	Western Australia	Desert
Koenpal^{[2]}		Queensland	
Koinjmal^{[2]}	Guwinmal^{[1]}	Queensland	Northeast
Kokangol^{[2]}		Queensland	
Kokatha	Kokata,^{[2]} Kokatha Mula, Kokatja, Googatha,	South Australia	
Koknar^{[1]}	Kwantari^{[2]}	Queensland	Gulf
Koko^{[2]}		Queensland	
Kokobididji^{[2]}		Queensland	
Kokobujundji^{[2]}		Queensland	
Kokoimudji^{[2]}		Queensland	
Kokojawa^{[2]}		Queensland	
Kokojelandji^{[2]}	Kuku-yalanji^{[1]}	Queensland	East
Kokokulunggur^{[2]}		Queensland	
Kokomini^{[1]}^{[2]}		Queensland	West Cape
Kokonjekodi^{[2]}		Queensland	
Kokopatun^{[2]}		Queensland	
Kokopera^{[2]}	Koko-bera^{[1]}	Queensland	West Cape
Kokowalandja^{[2]}		Queensland	
Kokowara^{[2]}	Kokowarra	Queensland	East
Kolakngat^{[2]}		Victoria	
Konbudj^{[1]}	(see Gonbudj language)	Northern Territory	North
Konejandi^{[2]}	Gooniyandi^{[1]}	Western Australia	Kimberley
Kongabula^{[2]}	Gungabula^{[1]}	Queensland	Northeast
Kongkandji^{[2]}		Queensland	
Koorie ^{[{{{2}}}]}	New South Wales		
Koreng^{[2]}	Goreng^{[1]}	Western Australia	Southwest
Korenggoreng^{[2]}	Gureng Gureng^{[1]}	Queensland	Northeast
Korindji^{[2]}	Gurindji^{[1]}	Northern Territory	Fitzmaurice
Kotandji^{[2]}	Ngandji^{[1]}	Northern Territory	Desert
Krauatungalung^{[2]}		Victoria	
Kujani^{[2]}	Kuyani^{[1]}	South Australia	Spencer
Kukatj^{[2]}	Kukatj^{[1]}, Marago, Gudadj, Gudadji, Gugady, Gugatj, Kokatj, Kukatji, Kukatyi, Konggada	Queensland	Gulf
Kukatja^{[1]}	Kokatja,^{[2]}, Gugadja, Kukati	Western Australia	Desert
Kuku Yulanji	Kuku Yulangi, Gugu Yulanji, Kuuku-yani^{[1]}	Daintree Rainforest; from Port Douglas in the south, Cooktown in the north, Chillagoe in the west; Queensland	East
Kurnu	Kula^{[2]} Noolulgo, Kurnu, Gunu, Guerno, Kornu, Kornoo, Kuno, Guno, Gunu^{[1]}	New South Wales	Riverine
Kulumali^{[2]}		Queensland	
Kumbainggiri^{[2]}	Kumbainggiri, Kumbainggeri, Kumbaingir, Kumbaingeri, Kumbangerai, Koombanggary, Koombainga, Coombangree, Coombyngura, Gumbaingar, Gunbaingar, Guinbainggri, Bellinger, Belingen, Nimboy, Woolgoolga, Orara, Gumbainggir,^{[1]} Gumbaynggir	New South Wales	Southeast
Kunapa people		Northern Territory	
Kundjeyhmi^{[1]}		Northern Territory	North
Kungadutji^{[2]}		Queensland	
Kungarakan^{[2]}	Kungarakany^{[1]}	Northern Territory	Fitzmaurice
Kunggara^{[2]}	Kurtjar^{[1]}	Queensland	Gulf
Kunggari^{[2]}	Gunggari^{[1]}	Queensland	Riverine
Kungkalenja^{[2]}		Queensland	
Kunindiri^{[2]}	Gunindiri^{[1]}	Northern Territory	Gulf
Kunja^{[1]}^{[2]}		Queensland	Riverine
Kunwinjku^{[1]}^{[2]}	Gunwinggu, Gunwingo, Wengi, Wengej, Gundeidjeme, Gundeidjepmi, Gunwingu, Kulunglutji, Kulunglutchi, Gundeijeme, Margulitban, Unigangk, Urnigangg, Koorungo, Neinggu, Mangaridji Mangeri	Northern Territory	Arnhem
Kurrama^{[1]}	Kurama,^{[2]} Gurama, Kerama, Karama, Korama, Kormama, Jana:ri, Jawunmara	Western Australia	Northwest
Kureinji^{[1]}^{[2]}	Kareingi, Karin, Kerinma, Karinma, Garengema, Garnghes, Kinenekinene, Kianigane, Keramin, Kemendok, Pintwa, Jungeegatchere	New South Wales	
Kuringgai^{[1]}	Awabakal^{[2]}	New South Wales	Southeast
Kurnai^{[1]}^{[2]}	Ganai, Gunai, Gunnai	Gippsland, Victoria	Southeast
Kurung^{[2]}		Victoria	
Kutjal^{[2]}		Queensland	
Kutjala^{[2]}		Queensland	
Kuuku-ya'u^{[1]}		Queensland	East
Kuungkari^{[1]}^{[2]}		Queensland	Eyre
Kuwema^{[1]}		Northern Territory	Fitzmaurice
Kwantari^{[2]}		Queensland	
Kwarandji^{[2]}		Northern Territory	
Kwatkwat^{[2]}		Victoria	
Kwiambal^{[2]}	Koi, Kweembul, Quieumble, Queenbulla, Ngarabal	New South Wales	
Kwini^{[1]}		Western Australia	Kimberley
L
Laia^{[2]}		Queensland	
Lairmairrener^{[2]}		Tasmania	
Lama Lama^{[1]}	Contemporary grouping; an aggregate of many clan groups. Not to be confused with Lama-Lama language, aka Mba Rumbathama.	Queensland	East
Lanima^{[2]}		Queensland	
Larrakia	Larakia,^{[1]}^{[2]} Larrakeyah, Larakya	Northern Territory	North
Lardiil^{[2]}	Lardil^{[1]}	Queensland	Gulf
Latjilatji^{[2]}	Latie Latie^{[1]}	Victoria	
Lotiga^{[2]}		Queensland	
Luritja^{[1]}	Loritja, Kukatja,^{[2]} Gugadja	Northern Territory	Desert
Luthigh^{[1]}		Queensland	West Cape
M
Madjandji^{[2]}		Queensland	
Madngela^{[2]}		Northern Territory	
Madoitja^{[2]}		Western Australia	
Maduwongga^{[2]}		Western Australia	
Magatige^{[2]}		Northern Territory	
Maya^{[1]}	Maia^{[2]}	Western Australia	Northwest
Maiawali^{[1]}^{[2]}		Queensland	Eyre
Maijabi^{[2]}	Mayi-Yapi^{[1]}	Queensland	Gulf
Maikudunu^{[2]}	Mayi-Kutuna^{[1]}	Queensland	Gulf
Maikulan^{[2]}	Mayi-Kulan^{[1]}	Queensland	Gulf
Maithakari^{[2]}	Mayi-Thakurti^{[1]}	Queensland	Gulf
Malak Malak^{[1]}		Northern Territory	Fitzmaurice
Malantji^{[2]}		Queensland	
Malgana^{[2]}	Malkana^{[1]}	Western Australia	Northwest
Malgaru^{[2]}		Western Australia	
Maljangapa^{[2]}	Maljangpa, Malya-napa, Mulya-napa, Mulya-nappa, Mullia-arpa, Malynapa, Maljapa, Malyapa, Maljangaba, Karikari, Bulali, Bulali, Malyangaba^{[1]}	New South Wales	Spencer
Malngin^{[2]}		Western Australia	
Malpa^{[1]}	(Kalaako?)	Western Australia	Southwest
Mamu^{[2]}	Morruburra (Dulgabara?)	Innisfail; from Murdering Point in the south to Tolga in the north, Queensland	
Manbarra		Palm Island, Queensland	
Mandandanji^{[1]}^{[2]}		Queensland	Riverine
Mandara^{[2]}		Western Australia	
Manthi		Western Australia	
Mandjildjara^{[2]}		Western Australia	
Mandjindja^{[1]}^{[2]}		Western Australia	Desert
Mangarla	Mangala^{[1]}^{[2]}	Western Australia	Desert
Mangarai^{[2]}	Mangarayi,^{[1]} Mungaria	Northern Territory	Fitzmaurice
Marra^{[1]}^{[2]}	Mara	Northern Territory	Gulf
Maranganji^{[2]}	Margany	Queensland	Riverine
Maranunggu^{[1]}		Northern Territory	Fitzmaurice
Maraura^{[2]}	Mareawura, Mareaura, Marowra, Marowera, Marraa Warree, Marrawarra, Waimbio, Wimbaja, Wiimbaio, Berlko, Ilaila, Barkindji	New South Wales	
Marditjali^{[2]}		Victoria	
Mardudunera^{[2]}	Martuthunira^{[1]}	Western Australia	Northwest
Mariamo^{[2]}		Northern Territory	
Maridan^{[2]}		Northern Territory	
Maridjabin^{[2]}		Northern Territory	
Marijedi^{[2]}		Northern Territory	
Marimanindji^{[2]}	Marramaninjsji^{[1]}	Northern Territory	Fitzmaurice
Maringar^{[2]}	Marringarr^{[1]}	Northern Territory	Fitzmaurice
Marinunggo^{[2]}		Northern Territory	
Marithiel^{[2]}	Marrithiyel^{[1]}	Northern Territory	Fitzmaurice
Mariu^{[2]}		Northern Territory	
Marrago^{[2]}		Queensland	
Martu	Mardu	Western Australia	
Marulta^{[2]}		Queensland	
Matuntara^{[2]}		Northern Territory	
Maung^{[1]}^{[2]}		Northern Territory	Arnhem
Maya	Maia^{[2]}	Western Australia	
Mbewum^{[2]}	Mbeiwum^{[1]}	Queensland	West Cape
Mbukarla^{[1]}		Northern Territory	North
Meintangk^{[2]}		South Australia	
Menthajangal^{[2]}		Northern Territory	
Meru	(Ngaiawang, Ngawait, Nganguruku, Erawirung?)	South Australia	Riverine
Mian^{[2]}	Miyan	Queensland	Northeast
Milpulo^{[2]}	Milpulko, Mailpurlgu, Mamba, Danggali	New South Wales	
Mimungkum^{[2]}		Queensland	
Minang^{[1]}^{[2]}		Western Australia	Southwest
Mingin^{[1]}^{[2]}		Queensland	Gulf
Minjambuta^{[2]}		Victoria	
Minjungbal^{[2]}	Minjangbal, Minyung, Minyowa, Gendo, Gando Minjang, Gandowal, Ngandowul, Cudgingberry	New South Wales	
Miriwung^{[2]}	Miriwoong,^{[1]} Miriuwong	Ord River, Western Australia	Kimberley
Mirning^{[1]}^{[2]}		Western Australia	Southwest
Mitaka^{[2]}	Mithaka^{[1]}	Queensland	Eyre
Mitjamba^{[2]}	Mbara^{[1]}	Queensland	Gulf
Miwa^{[1]}^{[2]}		Western Australia	Kimberley
Morowari^{[2]}	Murawari, Murawarri, Murrawarri, Muruworri, Muruwurri, Murueri, Moorawarree, Marawari, Marawara, Muruwari^{[1]}	New South Wales	Riverine
Mpalitjanh^{[1]}		Queensland	West Cape
Muluridji^{[2]}		Queensland	
Muragan^{[2]}		Queensland	
Murinbata^{[2]}	Murrinh-patha^{[1]}	Northern Territory	Fitzmaurice
Muringura^{[2]}		Northern Territory	
Murngin^{[2]}		Northern Territory	
Murunitja^{[2]}		Western Australia	
Muthimuthi^{[2]}	Muti Muti, Mutte Mutte, Matimati, Madi-madi, Mataua, Moorta, Matthee-matthee, Bakiin, Madi Madi,^{[1]} Madhi Madhi, Maruara. Also Yita Yida and Tati Dadi.	New South Wales	
Mutjati^{[2]}		Queensland	
Mutpura^{[2]}	Mudburra^{[1]}	Northern Territory	Fitzmaurice
Mutumui^{[1]}^{[2]}		Queensland	East
N
Nakako^{[1]}^{[2]}		Western Australia	Desert
Nakara^{[1]}^{[2]}		Northern Territory	Arnhem
Nana^{[1]}^{[2]}	Nganawongka	Western Australia	Desert
Nanda^{[2]}	Nhanta^{[1]}	Western Australia	Northwest
Nangatadjara^{[2]}	Nyanganyatyara^{[1]}	Western Australia	Desert
Nangatara^{[2]}		Western Australia	
Nanggikorongo^{[2]}		Northern Territory	
Nanggumiri^{[2]}	Ngan'giwumirri^{[1]}	Northern Territory	Fitzmaurice
Nango^{[2]}		Northern Territory	
Narangga^{[1]}^{[2]}		South Australia	Spencer
Narinari^{[2]}	Nari Nari^{[1]}	New South Wales	
Naualko^{[2]}	Nawalko, Ngunnhalgu, Unelgo, Bungyarlee, Wampandi, Wampangee, Wombungee, Barundji	New South Wales	
Nauo^{[2]}	Nawu^{[1]}	South Australia	Spencer
Nawagi^{[2]}	Nyawaygi^{[1]}	Queensland	Rainforest
Ngadadjara^{[2]}	Ngatatjara,^{[1]} Ngaanyatjarra^{[1]}	Western Australia	Desert
Ngadjunmaia^{[2]}	Ngatjumay^{[1]}	Western Australia	Southwest
Ngadjuri^{[1]}^{[2]}	Ŋadjuri	South Australia	Spencer
Ngaiawang^{[2]}		South Australia	
Ngaiawongga^{[2]}		Western Australia	
Ngaku^{[2]}	Niungacko, Dainggatti, Dunghutti	New South Wales	
Ngalakan^{[1]}^{[2]}		Northern Territory	Arnhem
Ngalea^{[1]}^{[2]}		South Australia	Desert
Ngalia^{[2]}		Northern Territory	
Ngaliwuru^{[1]}^{[2]}		Northern Territory	Fitzmaurice
Ngaluma^{[2]}	Ngarluma^{[1]}	Western Australia	Northwest
Ngamba^{[2]}	Ngambar, Ngeunbah, Biripi	New South Wales	
Ngameni^{[2]}	Ngamini^{[1]}	South Australia	Eyre
Ngandangara^{[2]}		Queensland	
Ngandi^{[1]}^{[2]}		Northern Territory	Arnhem
Ngan'gikurunggurr^{[1]}		Northern Territory	Fitzmaurice
Nganguruku^{[2]}		South Australia	
Ngarabal^{[1]}^{[2]}	Ngarabul, Ngarrabul, Narbul, Marbul	New South Wales	Southeast
Ngaralta^{[2]}		South Australia	
Ngardi^{[2]}	Ngarti^{[1]}	Northern Territory	Desert
Ngardok^{[2]}		Northern Territory	
Ngarigo^{[1]}^{[2]}	Ngarego, Ngarago, Garego, Currak-da-bidgee, Ngarigu, Ngarrugu, Ngarroogoo, Murring, Bemeringal, Guramal, Gurmal, Bradjerak, Bombala, Menero, Cooma	New South Wales	Southeast
Ngarinjin^{[2]}	Ngarinyin^{[1]}	Western Australia	Kimberley
Ngarinman^{[1]}^{[2]}		Northern Territory	Fitzmaurice
Ngarkat^{[2]}	Ngargad^{[1]}	South Australia	Riverine
Ngarla^{[1]}^{[2]}		Western Australia	Northwest
Ngarlawongga^{[2]}	Ngalawangka^{[1]}	Western Australia	Northwest
Ngarrindjeri^{[1]}	Raminyeri (or Ramindjeri), Narrinyeri	Lower Murray River	Riverine
Ngaro^{[2]}		Queensland	
Ngathokudi^{[2]}		Queensland	
Ngatjan^{[2]}		Queensland	
Ngaun^{[2]}	Ngawun^{[1]}	Queensland	Gulf
Ngawait^{[2]}		South Australia	
Ngewin^{[2]}		Northern Territory	
Nggamadi^{[2]}		Queensland	
Ngintait^{[2]}		South Australia	
Ngiyambaa	Ngemba	New South Wales	
Ngoborindi^{[2]}	Nguburinji^{[1]}	Queensland	Gulf
Ngolibardu^{[2]}		Western Australia	
Ngolokwangga^{[2]}		Northern Territory	
Ngombal^{[2]}	Ngumbarl^{[1]}	Western Australia	Kimberley
Ngormbur^{[2]}	Ngombur^{[1]}	Northern Territory	North
Ngugi^{[2]}		Queensland	
Ngulungbara^{[2]}		Queensland	
Ngunawal^{[1]}^{[2]}	Ngunuwal, Ngoonawawal, Wonnawal, Nungawal, Yarr, Yass, Lake George, Five Islands, Molonglo, Gurungada	Australian Capital Territory	Southeast
Ngundjan^{[2]}	Kunjen^{[1]}	Queensland	West Cape
Ngurawola^{[2]}		Queensland	
Ngurelban^{[2]}	Ngurraiillam^{[1]}	Victoria	Riverine
Nguri^{[1]}^{[2]}		Queensland	Riverine
Ngurlu^{[2]}		Western Australia	
Ngurunta^{[2]}		South Australia	
Niabali^{[2]}		Western Australia	
Nimanburu^{[1]}^{[2]}		Western Australia	Kimberley
Ninanu^{[2]}		Western Australia	
Njakinjaki^{[2]}	Nyaki-Nyaki^{[1]}	Western Australia	Southwest
Njamal^{[2]}	Nyamal^{[1]}	Western Australia	Northwest
Njangamarda^{[2]}	Nyangumarda^{[1]}	Western Australia	Desert
Njikena^{[2]}	Nyikina^{[1]}	Western Australia	Kimberley
Njulnjul^{[2]}	Nyul Nyul^{[1]}	Western Australia	Kimberley
Njunga^{[2]}		Western Australia	
Njuwathai^{[2]}		Queensland	
Noala^{[2]}	Nhuwala,^{[1]} Nhuwala-palyku	Western Australia	Northwest
Nokaan^{[2]}		Western Australia	
Noongar	Njunga, Nyoongar, Nyungar, Noongar. Comprises dialectical groups:, Juat, Balardong, Njunga, Njakinjaki, Wilman, Pindjarup, Pibelman (Bibulmun, Bibbulmun), Keneang, Minang (Menang), Koreng, Warandi, Whadjuk.	South-western Western Australia	
Norweilemil^{[2]}		Northern Territory	
Nuenonne^{[1]}	South east	Tasmania	Tasmania
Nukunu^{[1]}^{[2]}		South Australia	Spencer
Nunggubuju^{[2]}	Nunggubuyu^{[1]}	Northern Territory	Arnhem
Nunukul^{[2]}		Queensland	North Stradbroke Island
O
Oitbi^{[2]}		Northern Territory	
Ola^{[2]}	Worla^{[1]}	Western Australia	Kimberley
Olkolo^{[2]}		Queensland	
Ombila^{[2]}		Queensland	
Ongkarango^{[2]}	Unggarangi^{[1]}	Western Australia	Kimberley
Ongkomi^{[2]}	Unggumi^{[1]}	Western Australia	Kimberley
Otati^{[2]}		Queensland	
P
Pakadji^{[2]}		Queensland	
Pandjima^{[2]}	Banjima^{[1]}	Western Australia	Northwest
Pangerang^{[2]}		Victoria	
Pangkala^{[2]}	Banggarla^{[1]}	South Australia	Spencer
Paredarerme^{[1]}	Oyster Bay	Tasmania	Tasmania
Parundji^{[2]}	Paruindji, Paruindi, Paruinji, Paroinge, Barundji,^{[1]} Barungi, Bahroonjee, Baroongee, Bahroongee, Barrengee, Parooinge, Barunga	New South Wales	Riverine
Paiyungu^{[2]}	Bayungu	Port Hedland, Western Australia	Northwest
Peerapper^{[1]}		Tasmania	Tasmania
Peramangk^{[1]}^{[2]}		South Australia	Spencer
Perrakee		Unknown, either WA or NT	
Pibelmen^{[1]}^{[2]}	Bibbulman	Western Australia	Southwest
Pilatapa^{[2]}	Pirlatapa^{[1]}	South Australia	Eyre
Pindiini^{[2]}		Western Australia	
Pindjarup^{[2]}	Pinjareb, Pinjarup^{[1]}	Western Australia	Southwest
Pini^{[2]}		Western Australia	
Pintupi^{[1]}	Pintubi, Bindubi, Bindibu, Bindubu	Northern Territory	Desert
Pitapita^{[2]}	Pitta-Pitta^{[1]}	Queensland	Eyre
Pitjantjatjara^{[1]}	Pitjantjara, Pitjandjara^{[2]}	Central Australia	Desert
Pitjara^{[2]}	Bidjara^{[1]}	Queensland	Northeast
Pongaponga^{[2]}		Northern Territory	
Pontunj^{[2]}		Queensland	
Portaulun^{[2]}		South Australia	
Potaruwutj^{[2]}		South Australia	
Potidjara^{[2]}		Western Australia	
Punaba^{[2]}	Punuba^{[1]}	Western Australia	Kimberley
Puneitja^{[2]}		Northern Territory	
Punthamara^{[2]}		Queensland	
Pyemmairre^{[1]}		North East	Tasmania
R
Rakkaia^{[2]}		Queensland	
Ramindjeri^{[2]}		South Australia	
Rembarunga^{[2]}	Rembarnga^{[1]}	Northern Territory	Arnhem
Ringaringa^{[2]}		Queensland	
Rungarungawa^{[2]}		Queensland	
S
Spinifex people	Pila Nguru	Nullarbor Plain	
T
Tagalag^{[2]}	Takalak^{[1]}	Queensland	Gulf
Tagoman^{[2]}		Northern Territory	
Taior^{[2]}	Thaayorre^{[1]}	Queensland	West Cape
Talandiji	Thalanyji,^{[1]} Talandji^{[2]}	Western Australia	Northwest
Tanganekald^{[2]}		South Australia	
Targari^{[2]}	Tharrgari^{[1]}	Western Australia	Northwest
Taribelang^{[2]}		Queensland	
Tatungalung^{[2]}	Tatungoloong	Victoria	
Taungurung^{[1]}^{[2]}		Victoria	
Tedei^{[2]}		Western Australia	
Tenma^{[2]}		Western Australia	
Tepiti^{[2]}		Queensland	
Teppathiggi^{[1]}	Tepiti^{[2]}	Queensland	West Cape
Tharawal^{[1]}^{[2]}	Darawal, Carawal, Turawal, Thurawal, Thurrawal, Thurrawall, Turuwal, Turuwul, Turrubul, Tutuwull, Ta-ga-ry, Five Islands	New South Wales	Southeast
Thaua^{[2]}	Thawa, Tauaira, Thurga, Thoorga, Durga, Dhurga, Tharawal, Tadera-manji, Guyanagal, Guyangal-yuin, Murring, Katungal, Baianga, Paienbera	New South Wales	
Thereila^{[2]}		Queensland	
Thiin^{[1]}		Western Australia	Northwest
Tirari^{[2]}	Dhirari^{[1]}	South Australia	Eyre
Tjalkadjara^{[2]}	Tjalkanti^{[1]}	Western Australia	Desert
Tjapukai^{[2]}		Queensland	Rainforest
Tjapwurong^{[2]}	Djabwurung^{[1]}	Victoria	Riverine
Tjeraridjal^{[2]}		Western Australia	
Tjial^{[2]}		Northern Territory	
Tjingili^{[2]}	Jingili^{[1]}	Northern Territory	Desert
Tjongkandji^{[2]}	Tjungundji^{[1]}	Queensland	West Cape
Tjupany^{[1]}	= Madoidja?	Western Australia	Desert
Tjuroro^{[2]}	Jurruru^{[1]}	Western Australia	Northwest
Tommeginne^{[1]}	North	Tasmania	Tasmania
Toogee^{[1]}	South West	Tasmania	Tasmania
Totj^{[2]}		Queensland	
Tulua^{[2]}		Queensland	
Tunuvivi^{[2]}	Tiwi^{[1]}	Northern Territory	North
Tyerremotepanner^{[1]}		North Midlands	Tasmania
U
Umbindhamu^{[1]}	Barungguan^{[2]}	Queensland	East
Umede^{[2]}	Umida^{[1]}	Western Australia	Kimberley
Umpila^{[1]}	Ombila^{[2]}	Queensland	East
Undanbi^{[2]}		Queensland	
Unjadi^{[2]}		Queensland	
Uutaalnganu^{[1]}		Queensland	East
W
Wadere^{[2]}		Northern Territory	
Wadikali^{[2]}	Wadigali,^{[1]} Evelyn Creek	New South Wales	Eyre
Wadja^{[2]}	Wadjigu^{[1]}	Queensland	Northeast
Wadjabangai^{[2]}		Queensland	
Wadjalang^{[2]}	Dharawala^{[1]}	Queensland	
Wadjari^{[2]}	Watjarri^{[1]}	Western Australia	Northwest
Wagiman^{[1]}	Wagoman^{[2]}	Northern Territory	Fitzmaurice
Wailpi^{[2]}		South Australia	
Wakabunga^{[1]}^{[2]}		Queensland	Gulf
Wakaja^{[2]}	Wakaya^{[1]}	Northern Territory	Desert
Wakaman^{[2]}		Queensland	
Wakara^{[2]}		Queensland	
Wakawaka^{[2]}	Waka Waka^{[1]}	Queensland	Northeast
Walangama^{[1]}^{[2]}		Queensland	Gulf
Walbanga^{[2]}	Thurga, Thoorga, Bugellimanji, Bargalia, Moruya	New South Wales	
Walgalu^{[2]}	Walgadu, Wolgal, Wolgah, Tumut, Tumut River people, Guramal, Gurmal	New South Wales	
Waljen^{[2]}		Western Australia	
Walmadjari^{[2]}	Walmatjarri^{[1]}	Western Australia	Desert
Walmbaria^{[2]}		Queensland	
Walpiri^{[2]}	Warlpiri^{[1]}	Northern Territory	Desert
Walu^{[2]}		Northern Territory	
Waluwara^{[2]}	Warluwarra^{[1]}	Queensland	Desert
Wambaia^{[2]}	Wambaya^{[1]}	Northern Territory	Desert
Wanamara^{[2]}	Wunumara^{[1]}	Queensland	Gulf
Wandandian^{[2]}	Wandandian, Tharumba, Kurialyuin, Murraygaro, Jervis Bay	New South Wales	
Wandarang^{[2]}		Northern Territory	
Wandjira^{[2]}		Northern Territory	
Wangaaybuwan	Wongaibon, Ngemba, Ngeumba, Ngiumba	New South Wales	
Wangan^{[1]}^{[2]}		Queensland	Northeast
Wongi^{[1]}	Wangatha	Western Australia	Desert
Wanji^{[2]}	Waanyi^{[1]}	Northern Territory	Gulf
Wanjiwalku^{[2]}	Weyneubulkoo, Wonipalku, Wanyabalku, Wonjimalku, Pono, Pernowie, Pernowrie, Kongait, Tongaranka, Wandjiwalgu^{[1]}	New South Wales	Riverine
Wanjuru^{[2]}		Queensland	
Wanman^{[2]}		Western Australia	
Warakamai^{[2]}		Queensland	
Waramanga^{[2]}	Warumungu^{[1]}	Northern Territory	Desert
Wardal^{[2]}		Western Australia	
Wardaman^{[1]}^{[2]}		Northern Territory	Fitzmaurice
Wardandi^{[1]}^{[2]}		Western Australia	Southwest
Wargamaygan^{[1]}	Warakamai^{[2]}	Queensland	Rainforest
Wariangga^{[2]}	Warriyangga^{[1]}	Western Australia	Northwest
Warkawarka^{[2]}		Victoria	
Warki^{[2]}		South Australia	
Warlmanpa^{[1]}		South Australia	Desert
Warray^{[1]}		Northern Territory	Fitzmaurice
Warungu^{[2]}		Queensland	
Warwa^{[1]}^{[2]}		Western Australia	Kimberley
Wathaurung^{[2]}	Wathawurrung, Wada Warrung, Wathaurong^{[1]}	Geelong	Southeast
Watiwati^{[2]}	Wadi Wadi^{[1]}	Victoria	
Watta^{[2]}		Northern Territory	
Waveroo^{[1]}		New South Wales	Riverine
Wawula^{[1]}		Western Australia	Desert
Weilwan	Wailwan,^{[1]} Wayilwan, Weiwan, Wilwan, Wallwan, Wailwun, Waal-won, Wile wile, Wali, Waljwan, Ngiumba, Weilwan,^{[2]} Wailwan, Ngiyampaa Wailwan and Ngemba Wailwan	New South Wales	
Wembawemba^{[2]}	Wambawamba, Wamba Wamba, Womba, Weumba, Waamba, Waimbiwaimbi, Gourrmjanyuk, Gorrmjanyuk, Wemba Wemba^{[1]}	New South Wales	
Wenamba^{[2]}		Western Australia	
Wenambal^{[2]}	Wembria	Western Australia	
Weraerai^{[2]}	Wiraiarai, Weraiari, Wirri-wirri, Wirraarai, Warlarai, Wolroi, Wolleri, Waholari, Wolaroo, Walarai, Juwalarai, Walari, Wolaroi, Woolaroi, Ginniebal	New South Wales	
Whadjuk^{[2]}	Wadjuk, Whajook, Wadjug, Wajuk^{[1]}	Western Australia	Southwest
Widi^{[2]}		Western Australia	
Widjabal^{[2]}	Noowidal, Nowgyujul, Waibra, Ettrick, Watji, Watchee	New South Wales	
Wiilman^{[1]}^{[2]}	Weelman, Wilman	Western Australia	Southwest
Wik^{[1]}^{[2]}	Wikapatja, Wikatinda, Wikepa, Wik-kalkan, Wiknatanja, Wikianji, Mimungkum, Wikmean, Wikampama	Queensland	West Cape
Wikampama^{[2]}		Queensland	
Wikapatja^{[2]}		Queensland	
Wikatinda^{[2]}		Queensland	
Wikepa^{[2]}		Queensland	
Wikianji^{[2]}		Queensland	
Wik-kalkan^{[2]}		Queensland	
Wikmean^{[2]}		Queensland	
Wikmunkan^{[2]}		Queensland	
Wiknantjara^{[2]}		Queensland	
Wiknatanja^{[2]}		Queensland	
Wilawila^{[2]}		Western Australia	
Wilingura^{[2]}		Northern Territory	
Wilyakali^{[2]}	Wiljakali, Wiljali,^{[1]} Wiljagali, Bo-arli, Bulali, Wilyali	New South Wales	
Winduwinda^{[2]}	Winda Winda^{[1]}	Queensland	West Cape
Wiradjuri^{[1]}^{[2]}	Wiradyuri Wiradhuri Wiraduri, Wiradjeri, Wirrajerre, Wiradhari Wirra-dhari Wirradhurri, Wirraijuri, Wirrathuri Wiradthuri, Wiradtheri Wirathere, Wira-durei, Wira-shurri, Wirradgerry, Woradjeri Wooradjeri, Woorajuri, Woradjerg, Wirotheree, Wiratheri, Wi-ra jer-ree, Wirrai Durhai, Wagga	Central New South Wales	Riverine
Wirangu^{[1]}^{[2]}		South Australia	Spencer
Wirdinja^{[2]}		Western Australia	
Wiri^{[2]}		Queensland	
Wirngir^{[2]}		Western Australia	
Wodiwodi^{[2]}	Woddi Woddi, Illawarra, Tharawal	New South Wales	
Wogait^{[2]}	Worgait	Northern Territory	
Wooptang^{[2]}	Wooptang Woobla	Western Australia	
Wongaibon^{[1]}	Wongai-bun, Wongabon, Wonghibone, Wonjhibon, Wonjibone, Wongi-bone, Wonghi, Wungai, Wuzai, Wozai, Mudall, Wangaaybuwan	New South Wales	Riverine
Wongkadjera^{[2]}		Queensland	
Wongkamala^{[2]}	Wangkamana^{[1]}	Northern Territory	Eyre
Wongkanguru^{[2]}	Wangkangurru^{[1]}	South Australia	Eyre
Wongkumara^{[2]}	Wangkumara^{[1]}	Queensland	Eyre
Wonnarua^{[1]}^{[2]}	Wonnuaruah, Wannerawa, Wonarura, Wonnah	Hunter Region	Southeast
Worimi^{[1]}^{[2]}	Warrimee, Warramie, Gadang, Kattang, Kutthung, Guttahn, Cottong, Wattung, Watthungk, Kutthack, Gingai, Gringai, Gooreenggai, Port Stephens tribe	New South Wales	Southeast
Worora^{[1]}^{[2]}		Western Australia	Kimberley
Wotjobaluk^{[2]}	Wotjoballuk, Wergaia^{[1]}	Victoria	
Wudjari^{[1]}^{[2]}		Western Australia	Southwest
Wulgurukaba^{[2]}		Queensland	
Wulili^{[2]}	Wuli-wuli^{[1]}	Queensland	Northeast
Wulpura^{[2]}		Queensland	
Wulwulam^{[2]}		Northern Territory	
Wunambal^{[2]}	Wunambul^{[1]}	Western Australia	Kimberley
Wuningargk^{[1]}		Northern Territory	North
Wurango^{[2]}		Northern Territory	
Wurundjeri^{[2]}	Wirundjeri, Woiworung,^{[1]} Woiwurrong	Melbourne	South Central
Wuthathi		Queensland	East
Y
Yamatji	Amangu, Badimia, Yamatji Marlpa, Baiyungu (Gnulli Claim), Budina, Gnulli, Malgana, Naaguja, Nanda, Thudgari, Yugunga-Nya, Wajarri Yamatji	Western Australia	Murchison and gascoyne
Yanda^{[2]}	Janda^{[1]}	Queensland	Eyre
Yuguurtuu		Queensland	East
Yadhaykenu		Queensland and northeast NSW	
Yanyuwa	Anula, Janjula, Yanula, Yanuwa	Borroloola	
Yarra Yarra		Melbourne	
Yaygirr	Yaegl	Clarence Valley, New South Wales	Southeast
Yiman		Queensland	
Yiwara			Desert
Yolngu^{[1]}	Dangu^{[2]}	Arnhem Land	Arnhem
Yorta Yorta	Bangerang, Jotijota,^{[2]} Yotayota, Yoorta, Gunbowers, Gunbowerooranditchgoole, Loddon, Ngarrimouro, Arramouro, Woollathura, Echuca tribe, Yota Yota, Kailtheban, Wollithiga, Moira, Ulupna, Kwat Kwat, Yalaba Yalaba, Nguaria-iiliam-wurrung, Yorta Yorta, Kamilaroi	New South Wales, Victoria	Riverine
Yuggera^{[1]}	Jagara^{[2]}	Queensland	Northeast
Yuin^{[1]}	Yuwin, Djiringanj,^{[2]} Dyirringan, Jeringin, Juwin, Thaua	Eurobodalla Shire, south-eastern New South Wales	Southeast
Yulparitja^{[1]}	Nangatara^{[2]}	South Australia	Desert
Yuwaalaraay^{[2]}	Yualarai, Yualloroi, Yowaleri, Uollaroi, Youallerie, Yualari, Yualai, Yerraleroi, Yowalri, Euahlayi, Juwaljai, Yuwalyai, Wallarai, Wolleroi, Walleri, Wollaroi, Noongahburrahs, Yuwaaliyaay, Ualarai	New South Wales	

== See also ==
- Australian frontier wars
- Indigenous peoples of Australia
- Languages confirmed by AIATSIS

== Notes ==
1. This name is one of the names used on the widely used Aboriginal Australia Map, David Horton (ed.), 1994 published in The Encyclopedia of Aboriginal Australia by AIATSIS. Early versions of the map also divided Australia into 18 regions (Southwest, Northwest, Desert, Kimberley, Fitzmaurice, North, Arnhem, Gulf, West Cape, Torres Strait, East, Rainforest, Northeast, Eyre, Riverine, Southeast, Spencer and Tasmania); the region of the tribes which are depicted in this map are shown in the last column of this table.
2. This name is the main name used in Norman Tindale's Catalogue of Australian Aboriginal Tribes. Each has a separate article under the name listed there, and alternative names are also listed. In most cases (but not all) the name in the left column "Group name" is also the main name used by Tindale.

== Sources ==
- "AusAnthrop Australian Aboriginal tribal database - Jaburara". AusAnthrop.net. Archived from the original on 17 March 2009.
- "Barapa Barapa". Murray Lower Darling Rivers Indigenous Nations. 6 July 2011. Archived from the original on 6 July 2011.
- "Definition of NARRINYERI". Dictionary by Merriam-Webster.
- "General Information Folio 5: Appropriate Terminology, Indigenous Australian Peoples" (PDF). Flinders University.
- Gould, Richard A. (1969). Yiwara; foragers of the Australian desert. New York, N.Y.: Scribner. OCLC 23296.
- Norman B. Tindale (1974). Aboriginal Tribes of Australia: Their Terrain, Environmental Controls, Distribution, Limits, and Proper Names. Canberra: ANU Press. ISBN 0-7081-0741-9. LCCN 75516991. OCLC 3052288. OL 4795942M. Wikidata Q128257949.
- "Traditional Life". Archived from the original on 22 March 2010.
