= Ngarlawangga =

Indigenous people of Western Australia

The Ngarlawongga, or more properly Ngarla, were an Aboriginal Australian people of the inland Mid West region of Western Australia. They are not to be confused with the Ngarla who live on the coast.

== Country ==
The Ngarlawongga were the people who inhabited the area of the headwaters of the Ashburton and Gascoyne rivers, going south to the vicinity of the Three Rivers and Mulgul. Their eastern extension ran to Ilgarari. In Norman Tindale's estimation, their tribal territories covered some 8,700 square miles (23,000 km^{2}).

On the Ngarlawongga's boundaries, to their immediate north were the Mandara, then, running clockwise, the Wirdinya north-east, followed by the Wardal, and the Madoitja south/southeast and the Watjarri to their south-west. The Ninanu lay on their western flank, below the northwestern Inawongga.

== People ==
The Australian writer Katharine Susannah Prichard's 1929 novel of interracial love, Coonardoo, was written directly after her stay among the Ngarlawongga while resident on McGuire's pastoral station, which was run by local Aboriginal people. She called them Gnarler and found the Ngarlawongga both "poetic" and "naive".

== Alternative names ==
- Ngalawongga
- Nalawonga
- Ngarla-warngga
- "Southern Pad'ima" Ngalawonga
- Ngarla (to be distinguished from the Ngarla of the De Grey River)

== Sources ==
- "AIATSIS map of Indigenous Australia". AIATSIS. 14 May 2024.
- Kossew, Sue (2004). Writing Woman, Writing Place: Contemporary Australian and South African Fiction. Routledge. ISBN 978-1-134-44811-1.
- "Tindale Tribal Boundaries" (PDF). Department of Aboriginal Affairs, Western Australia. September 2016. Archived from the original (PDF) on 8 March 2016.
- Tindale, Norman Barnett (1974). "Ngarlawongga (WA)". Aboriginal Tribes of Australia: Their Terrain, Environmental Controls, Distribution, Limits, and Proper Names. Australian National University Press. ISBN 978-0-708-10741-6. Archived from the original on 20 March 2020.
