= Wikatinda =

Indigenous Australian people

The Wikatinda were an indigenous Australian people of the Cape York Peninsula of northern Queensland. They were one of the Wik peoples, but their language is unattested.

== Country ==
The Wikatinda were a small tribe whose territory, estimated by Norman Tindale to embrace some 200 square miles (520 km^{2}), extended from the coastal area, south from the Archer River to a distance inland of roughly 8 miles.

== People ==
By the writing of Tindale's writing (1974) he stated that the Wikatinda were "virtually extinct".

== Alternative names ==
- Adinda
- Wik Tinda

Source: Tindale 1974, p. 188

== Sources ==
- "AIATSIS map of Indigenous Australia". AIATSIS. 14 May 2024.
- McConnel, Ursula H. (September 1939). "Social Organization of the Tribes of Cape York Peninsula, North Queensland". Oceania. 10 (1): 54–72. doi:10.1002/j.1834-4461.1939.tb00256.x. JSTOR 40327744.
- McConnel, Ursula H. (June 1940). "Social Organization of the Tribes of Cape York Peninsula, North Queensland (Continued)". Oceania. 10 (4): 434–455. doi:10.1002/j.1834-4461.1940.tb00305.x. JSTOR 40327867.
- Sutton, Peter (1979). Wik: Aboriginal society, territory and language at Cape Keerweer, Cape York Peninsula, Australia (PDF) (PhD thesis). University of Queensland.
- Thomson, D. F. (1946). "Names and Naming in the Wik Mongkan". Journal of the Royal Anthropological Institute. 76 (2): 157–168. JSTOR 2844514.
- Tindale, Norman Barnett (1974). "Wikatinda (QLD)". Aboriginal Tribes of Australia: Their Terrain, Environmental Controls, Distribution, Limits, and Proper Names. Australian National University. ISBN 978-0-708-10741-6.
