= Nyuwathayi =

Aboriginal Australian people

The Nyuwathayi (Njuwathai) were an Aboriginal Australian people of the Cape York Peninsula of Queensland. They may have spoken the Yinwum language, based on their location, but there is no data.

== Country ==
The extent of Nyuwathai lands has been estimated to encompass some 700 square miles (1,800 km^{2}), primarily around the middle Wenlock River.

By the time Ursula McConnel did her ethnographic surveys in the late 1920s and 1930s, it appeared that the Nyuwathai gathered with the Atjinuri and Yinwum at the Moreton Telegraph Station.

== Sources ==
- McConnel, Ursula H. (September 1939). "Social Organization of the Tribes of Cape York Peninsula, North Queensland". Oceania. 10 (1): 54–72. doi:10.1002/j.1834-4461.1939.tb00256.x. JSTOR 40327744.
- McConnel, Ursula H. (June 1940). "Social Organization of the Tribes of Cape York Peninsula, North Queensland (Continued)". Oceania. 10 (4): 434–455. doi:10.1002/j.1834-4461.1940.tb00305.x. JSTOR 40327867.
- Tindale, Norman Barnett (1974). "Njuwathai (QLD)". Aboriginal Tribes of Australia: Their Terrain, Environmental Controls, Distribution, Limits, and Proper Names. Australian National University. ISBN 978-0-708-10741-6.
