= Ildawongga =

Aboriginal Australian people

The Ildawongga are an Aboriginal Australian people of the Pilbara region of Western Australia.

== Country ==
Norman Tindale could make no estimate of the extent of the Ildawongga's tribal lands. They lay west of Lake Mackay on the Western Australian side of the border with the Northern Territory. Their northern frontier is believed to be near the Stansmore Range, around a place known to them as Manggai. According to Mandjildjara tradition, their land began at several days walking distance east of Well 37 on the Canning Stock Route.

According to Tindale's map, the neighbouring tribes of the Ildawongga, starting from the north and running clockwise, were the Gugadja, the Ngarti (northeast), the Pintubi on their eastern flank, the Wenamba, then the Keiadjara directly south, and the Mandjildjara due west. The AIATSIS map on the other hand does not assign any independent territory to the Ildawongga, but subsumes their land under that of the Pintubi.

== History of contact ==
Word that a tribe of this name existed goes back to 1953, when a Pintubi man mentioned them as the Ilda, a statement repeated by other informants over the following years. Contact was finally made in 1964 at Jupiter Creek, and Tindale considered them to have been perhaps "the last of the free-living aborigines of Australia to come into Western contact", though subsequently some other groups who had never met white people were encountered, though belonging to a tribe that was already known, the Ngadadjara.

They were taken in April 1964 to receive assistance at Papunya.

== Alternative names ==
- Ilda
- Ilta
- Maiadjara
- Maiidjara (Gugadja term)
- Manggawara
- Wanar:wanari (a Pintubi exonym)

Source: Tindale 1974, p. 241

== Sources ==
- "AIATSIS map of Indigenous Australia". AIATSIS. 14 May 2024.
- "Tindale Tribal Boundaries" (PDF). Department of Aboriginal Affairs, Western Australia. September 2016. Archived from the original (PDF) on 8 March 2016.
- Tindale, Norman Barnett (1974). "Indawongga (NT)". Aboriginal Tribes of Australia: Their Terrain, Environmental Controls, Distribution, Limits, and Proper Names. Australian National University Press. ISBN 978-0-708-10741-6. Archived from the original on 20 March 2020.
- Tonkinson, Robert (1989). "Local Organisation and Land Tenure in the Karlamilyi (Rudall River) Region" (PDF). In Western Desert Working Group (ed.). The significance of the Karlamilyi Region to the Martujarra people of the Western Desert. Perth: Department of Conservation and Land Management. pp. 99–259.
