= Tjial =

Extinct Australian indigenous ethnicity

The Tjial were an indigenous Australian people of the Northern Territory who are now extinct.

== Country ==
The Tjial's heartland, estimated by Norman Tindale to encompass about 1,700 square miles (4,400 km^{2}), lay around Old Limbunja. They were wedged between the lower Victoria River and the upper West Baines River.

== Social organization ==
R. H. Mathews argued that the Tjial, together with two other tribes of the Victoria River Valley, namely the Bilingara and Kwarandji, shared an identical classificatory pattern for intermarriage. Mathews argued that the system, classifying women into two cycles, each having "perpetual succession within itself," was one characterized by matrilineal descent. His schema, he claimed, was quickly adopted by Francis Gillen and Baldwin Spencer in their analysis of the class system of the Bingongina, which however redeployed the pattern to argue that the latter had but two moieties exhibiting patrilineal descent. A controversy over the interpretation of these data sets arose, with A. R. Radcliffe-Brown effectively winning the day by arguing that the quarrel over matrilineal/patrilineal descent was confused by a failure to appreciate that "descent" in the abstract is meaningless, unless one takes into account the intricacies of class, phratry and totem relations, and irregularities in the overall system. (Note: 'Where a tribe is divided into four or eight classes, wrote Radcliffe-Brown, then as long as we consider only the classes, "and take note only of regular marriages, there can be no question as to whether descent is through the father or the mother. In every case it is through both". Where classes are grouped into moieties, it does make sense to talk about descent with respect to the moieties.' Langham adds that today, the Arunta system used by Radcliffe-Brown to claim a patrilineal descent pattern, is now considered matrilineal. (Langham 2012, pp. 334–335))

== History of contact ==
Writing in 1901, R. H. Mathews classified the Tjial as an "important tribe", but by the time of Norman Tindale's writing, in 1978 they had become extinct. With their disappearance, their lands were taken over by the Ngaliwurru to their north.

== Alternative names ==
- Cheeal, Chee'al
- Geelowng
- Jael
- Jeelowng

== Sources ==
- Langham, K. (2012). The Building of British Social Anthropology: W.H.R. Rivers and his Cambridge Disciples in The Development of Kinship Studies, 1898–1931. Studies in the History of Modern Science. Vol. 8. Springer Science & Business Media. ISBN 978-9-400-98464-6.
- Mathews, R. H. (July–September 1900). "The Wombya Organization of the Australian Aborigines". American Anthropologist. New Series. 2 (3): 494–501. doi:10.1525/aa.1900.2.3.02a00050. JSTOR 658964.
- Mathews, R. H. (1901). "Ethnological notes on the aboriginal tribes of the Northern Territory" (PDF). Queensland Geographical Journal. 16: 69–90.
- Mathews, R. H. (1908). "Matrilineal descent, North Territory". Man. 8: 150–152. doi:10.2307/2840262. JSTOR 2840262.
- Tindale, Norman Barnett (1974). "Tjial (NT)". Aboriginal Tribes of Australia: Their Terrain, Environmental Controls, Distribution, Limits, and Proper Names. Australian National University Press. ISBN 978-0-708-10741-6.
- Wiltshire, W. H. (1896). Land of the dawning. Adelaide.
