= Ngathokudi =

Aboriginal Australian people

The Ngathokudi (Ngadhugudi) were an Aboriginal Australian people of the state of Queensland. Their language was possibly a dialect of Uradhi.

== Country ==
The Ngathokudi, in Norman Tindale's estimation, had some 600 square miles (1,600 km^{2}) of territory on the south side of the upper Ducie River.

== Alternative names ==
- (Ng)uthukuti
- Athokurra

== Sources ==
- McConnel, Ursula H. (September 1939). "Social Organization of the Tribes of Cape York Peninsula, North Queensland". Oceania. 10 (1): 54–72. doi:10.1002/j.1834-4461.1939.tb00256.x. JSTOR 40327720.
- McConnel, Ursula H. (June 1940). "Social Organization of the Tribes of Cape York Peninsula, North Queensland (Continued)". Oceania. 10 (4): 434–455. doi:10.1002/j.1834-4461.1940.tb00305.x. JSTOR 40327867.
- Sharp, R. Lauriston (March 1939a). "Tribes and Totemism in North-East Australia". Oceania. 9 (3): 254–275. doi:10.1002/j.1834-4461.1939.tb00232.x. JSTOR 40327744.
- Sharp, R. Lauriston (June 1939b). "Tribes and Totemism in North-East Australia (Continued)". Oceania. 9 (4): 439–461. doi:10.1002/j.1834-4461.1939.tb00248.x. JSTOR 40327762.
- Thomson, Donald F. (July 1932). "Ceremonial Presentation of Fire in North Queensland. A Preliminary Note on the Place of Fire in Primitive Ritual". Man. 32: 162–166. doi:10.2307/2790779. JSTOR 2790779.
- Tindale, Norman Barnett (1974). "Ngathokudi (QLD)". Aboriginal Tribes of Australia: Their Terrain, Environmental Controls, Distribution, Limits, and Proper Names. Australian National University Press.
