= Yawarrawarrka =

Aboriginal Australian people

The Yawarrawarrka (also written Yawarawarka, Jauraworka) were an Indigenous people of South Australia.

== Country ==
According to the calculations of Norman Tindale, the Yauraworka's tribal lands encompassed some 5,600 square miles (15,000 km^{2}), running north of Cooper Creek to Haddon Downs and taking in Cordillo Downs and Cadelga. Their eastern extension penetrated the sandhills east of Goyder Lagoon, running up to roughly Arrabury. Their southeasterly frontier was close to Innamincka, though the Ngurawola also claimed this area.

== Alternative names ==
- Jauroworka,, Yarrawaurka, Yarrawurka
- Yauroka
- Yauarawaka, Yarroworka
- Jaurorka, Yaurorka, Yarawuarka
- Yerawaka, Yowerawoolka, Yowerawarrika

== Some words ==
- mulla (tame dog)
- anya (father)
- umma (mother)

== Sources ==
- "Aboriginal South Australia". Government of South Australia. Archived from the original on 1 May 2013.
- "AIATSIS map of Indigenous Australia". AIATSIS.
- Cornish, W. H. (1886). "Warburton River: Cooper's Creek, to the eastward of its northern branch; also Koongi lake." (PDF). In Curr, Edward Micklethwaite (ed.). The Australian race: its origin, languages, customs, place of landing in Australia and the routes by which it spread itself over the continent. Vol. 2. Melbourne: J. Ferres. pp. 22–25.
- Eylmann, Erhard (1908). Die Eingeborenen der Kolonie Südaustralien (PDF). Berlin: D.Reimer.
- Gason, Samuel (1895). "Of the tribes, Dieyerie, Auminie, Yandrawontha, Yarawuarka, Pilladapa". Journal of the Anthropological Institute of Great Britain and Ireland. 24: 167–176. JSTOR 2842215.
- Howitt, Alfred William (1904). The native tribes of south-east Australia. Macmillan Publishers.
- Howitt, Alfred William; Siebert, Otto (January–June 1904). "Legends of the Dieri and Kindred Tribes of Central Australia". The Journal of the Anthropological Institute of Great Britain and Ireland. 34: 100–129. doi:10.2307/2843089. JSTOR 2843089.
- Mathews, R. H. (January 1900). "Divisions of the South Australian Aborigines". Proceedings of the American Philosophical Society. 39 (161): 78–91+93. JSTOR 983545.
- Tindale, Norman Barnett (1974). "Jauraworka (SA)". Aboriginal Tribes of Australia: Their Terrain, Environmental Controls, Distribution, Limits, and Proper Names. Australian National University Press. ISBN 978-0-708-10741-6. Archived from the original on 26 December 2017.
