= Ngaliwurru =

Ngaliwurru may be,

- Ngaliwurru people
- Ngaliwurru language
