= Jidi Jidi Aboriginal Corporation =

The Jidi Jidi Aboriginal Corporation is an RNTBC created in accordance with the Native Title Act 1993, to manage and be trustee of the Native Title of the Nharnuwangga Wajarri Ngarlawangga People, a group of Aboriginal Australian peoples in the Pilbara region of Western Australia.

The Nharnuwangga Wajarri Ngarlawangga People were the first group of native title holders in Western Australia to successfully prove their native title to their Country under Australian native title law.

On 29 August 2000, in Clarrie Smith v State of Western Australia in the Federal Court of Australia, Justice Madgwick determined, by consent, that the Nharnuwangga, Wajarri and Ngarlawangga peoples held native title in an area of about 50,000 square kilometres (19,000 sq mi) of land, much of it alienated for pastoral and mining purposes, in the Upper Murchison and Upper Gascoyne region of Western Australia.

The Jidi Jidi Corporation is made up of members from the Yulga Jinna Community in Meekatharra, Western Australia. One of the native title holders, Michelle Riley from the Yulga Jinna Community, provides a personal perspective of the experience of Nharnuwangga, Wajarri and Ngarla native title settlement in a paper published by the Australian Institute of Aboriginal and Torres Strait Islander Studies paper, titled Winning Native Title: The experience of the Nharnuwangga, Wajarri and Ngarla People.

The Nharnuwangga Wajarri and Ngarlawangga people still feel that their country continues to be destroyed without any consultation with the traditional owners. Linda Riley, Elder and Chairperson of the Jidi Jidi Aboriginal Corporation, continues the struggle to have the heritage of the Nharnuwangga, Wajarri And Ngarla people respected.

On 11 July 2005, the Jidi Jidi Aboriginal Corporation made a submission to the Inquiry into Native Title Representative Bodies by the Parliament of the Commonwealth of Australia, Parliamentary Joint Committee on Native Title and the Aboriginal and Torres Strait Islander Land Account. The Native Title Act provides for the establishment of a Native Title Prescribed Body Corporate for each determination where native title exists. A Prescribed Body Corporate holds in trust or manage native title on behalf of the native title holders. The Prescribed Body Corporate is currently regulated by the Native Title Act, the Native Title (Prescribed Body Corporate) Regulations, and the Aboriginals Councils and Associations Act 1976.

In March 2006, the Report on the operation of Native Title Representative Bodies at (5.68) states "The dire situation of many PBCs due to lack of resources was highlighted during the inquiry. The Jidi Jidi Aboriginal Corporation (a PBC) stated that ’because our Corporation has no staff, no resources and no income, we cannot protect the native title that we fought so hard for".

A 30 January 2007 article appearing in The Australian newspaper by Victoria Laurie, "Land-use contracts fail to deliver for Aborigines", reports "agreements between Aborigines, mining companies and governments has failed to deliver significant outcomes for many of the indigenous people who signed them" and quotes the "Jidi Jidi Aboriginal Corporation, says it has sent complaint letters to 125 mining companies exploring on 50,000 km² of traditional land in the state's mid-west, putting them on notice that exploration cannot go ahead if the heritage protection clauses in a 2001 indigenous land use agreement are not met. Only five companies have signed so far".

== See also ==
- Native Title Prescribed Body Corporate
