= Nhaawuparlku =

Indigenous Australian ethnic group

The Naualko (Nhaawuparlku) were an indigenous Australian people of New South Wales.

== Name ==
The name Naualko derives from their word for 'yes'(naua/nawa (so written by Norman Tindale). The word is now reconstructed as nhaawu, and thus their endonym means 'the people who utter nhaawu when they say 'yes.'

== Language ==
The Naualko language, which was spoken in the Wilcannia area, became extinct very early on as colonization began. Luise Hercus and others now consider that it is probably related more to Kurnu than to Paakantyi. It has recently been argued, though no certainty attaches to the hypothesis, that the language of the Milpulo was a dialect of Naualko.

== Country ==
The Naulko moved over their tribal terrain's 10,000 square miles (26,000 km^{2}), in the far western sector of New South Wales, from Dunlop to Murtee on the upper Darling River. They were also around the lower Paroo River north to Lake Tongo.

== People ==
It has been suggested that the Naualko might be classified as a northern branch of the Paakantyi. Norman Tindale, taking into consideration the distinctive word for 'yes' in their ethnonym, argues that the probabilities lie with their being an independent tribe. In addition, early settlers like Frederic Bonney, familiar with the area's tribes, treated them as a discrete group.

== Alternative names ==
- Bungyarlee
- Nawalko
- Ngunnhalgu
- Ngunnhlgri (This is a misprint)
- Nhaawuparlku
- Unelgo
- Wampandi (meaning 'I do not understand')
- Wampangee, Wompungee, Wombungee

== Sources ==
- Andersen, Elena Handlos (2015). Development of a Learner's Grammar for Paakantyi (PDF) (M.A. thesis). School of Linguistics, Faculty of Arts and Social Sciences, University of Sydney.
- Hercus, Luise A.; Austin, Peter (2004). "The Yarli languages". In Bowern, Claire; Koch, Harold (eds.). Australian Languages: Classification and the comparative method. John Benjamins Publishing. pp. 207–222. ISBN 978-9-027-29511-8.
- Howitt, Alfred William (1904). The native tribes of south-east Australia (PDF). Macmillan.
- Newland, Simpson (1889). "The Parkengees, or, Aboriginal tribes on the Darling River". Proceedings of the Royal Geographic Society of Australia, South Australian Branch. 2: 20–32.
- Tindale, Norman Barnett (1974). "Naualko (NSW)". Aboriginal Tribes of Australia: Their Terrain, Environmental Controls, Distribution, Limits, and Proper Names. Australian National University Press. ISBN 978-0-708-10741-6.
