= Norweilemil =

The Norweilemil were an indigenous Australian people of the Northern Territory.

== Country ==
They were a small tribe with, in Tindale's estimation, some 400 square miles (1,000 km^{2}) of territory on the southeastern flank of the Van Diemen Gulf, and west of the West Alligator River. They were also attested around Stuart Point.

== Practices ==
Baldwin Spencer classifies them with many other contiguous tribes in that area:

To the same group of tribes belong, apparently, the Koarnbut, Quiradara, Norweilemil, Punuurlu, Kumertuo, Geimbio, Malanji, and, possibly, the Larakia. These, together with the Iwaldji, Kakadu, and the Melville and Bathurst Islanders, form a group of tribes sharply marked off, not only by the absence of class organisation, but by the fact that their initiation ceremonies are distinguished by the absence of both circumcision and subincision.

He also adds that, like the others, they do not appear to have used bullroarers.

== Alternative names ==
- Lemil (?)
- Noalanji (Note: Spencer distinguishes the Noalanji from the Norweilemil, a distinction apparently ignored by Tindale.)

== Sources ==
- Spencer, Baldwin (1914). Native tribes of the Northern Territory of Australia (PDF). London: Macmillan Publishers.
- Tindale, Norman Barnett (1974). "Norweilemil (NT)". Aboriginal Tribes of Australia: Their Terrain, Environmental Controls, Distribution, Limits, and Proper Names. Australian National University.
