= Kaiabara =

Aboriginal Australian group

The Kaiabara are an indigenous Australian people of the state of Queensland.

Rather than an independent tribe, they may have been a horde of the Wakka Wakka.

== Country ==
Norman Tindale put Kaiabara territory at around 1,000 square miles (2,600 km^{2}), around the headwaters of Stuart Creek, running south from roughly the area of Proston to Kingaroy and the Cooyar Range. They constituted a rather small tribe, and R. H. Mathews considered it more appropriate to write of a "family" or "triblet".

== Social organization ==
The Kaiabara marriage system's description was contested among early ethnographers. R. H. Mathews in several articles claimed that it was matrilineal while Alfred William Howitt, followed by Andrew Lang, argued that descent was patrilineal.

Howitt initially posited that there was a general class system he and Lorimer Fison called the Gamilaraay type, with a variant common in south-eastern Queensland stipulating descent through the male line, citing the Kaiabara as one of the Bunya mountain tribes which exemplified the pattern. Relying on information garnered by correspondence with Jocelyn Brooke, a Sub-Inspector attached to the Australian native police, he divided the Kaiabara into two phratries, each having two clans within their respective subdivisions, with the following results: (Note: Howitt concluded:'From these diagrams it is clear that with the Kaiabara descent is in the male line, for the children are of the same primary division as their father, and of that sub-division which, with his own, is equal to the primary division. In the Kamilaroi type the children belong to the primary division of their mother and to the sister sub-class of that to which she belongs. I think that we may safely assume that the Kaiabara system is a development of that of the Kamilaroi type which surrounds it on the north-west and south, and of which it is the recognised equivalent.' (Howitt & Fison 1889, pp. 48–50))

Primary divisions	Sub-classes	Totems
Kabatine	Bulkoin/Bunda	Carpet snake; native cat; flood water
Dilebi	Baring/Turowain	Turtle; bat; lightning

Establishing these general divisions, he concluded that the marriage rules were as follows:

Male	Marries	Children are
(M) Bulkoin	(F) Turowain	Bunda
(M) Bunda	(F) Baring	Bulkoin
(M) Baring	(F) Bunda	Turowain
(M) Turowain	(F) Bulkoin	Baring

Howitt's schema caused a technical perplexity, causing the amateur ethnographer Andrew Lang to speak of an "intricate puzzle", for Howitt was arguing that, viewed in terms of the phratries and their subclasses, the descent was from the father whereas, viewed in terms of the totems associated with them, the descent was in the female line. Unlike Howitt, Mathews had personally interviewed the relevant tribal elders to ascertain the facts and verify the models proposed. As a result, he formulated the following system:

Phratry	Male	Marries	Children are
Karpeun	Balkoin (Banjoor)	Derwain	Bunda
Karpeun	Barrang	Bunda	Derwain
Deeajee	Bunda	Barrang	Banjoor (Balkoin)
Deeajee	Derwain	Banjoor (Balkoin)	Barrang

== Alternative names ==
- Bujibada
- Bujibara (buji means carpet snake)
- Bujiebara, Booyieburra, Buijibara
- Cooyarbara
- Kaia (toponym for the Cooyar Range and Mount Cooyar)
- Kaibara (typo)
- Kaiyabora
- Kiabara
- Koiabara

Source: Tindale 1974, p. 173

== Sources ==
- Howitt, Alfred William (1884). "Remarks on the class systems collected by Mr. E. Palmer". The Journal of the Anthropological Institute of Great Britain and Ireland. 13: 335–347. JSTOR 2841896.
- Howitt, Alfred William (1904). The native tribes of south-east Australia (PDF). Macmillan.
- Howitt, Alfred William; Fison, Lorimer (1889). "Further Notes on the Australian Class Systems". The Journal of the Anthropological Institute of Great Britain and Ireland. 18: 31–70. doi:10.2307/2842513. JSTOR 2842513.
- Lang, Andrew (1910). "The Puzzle of Kaiabara Sub-Class Names". Man. 10: 130–134. doi:10.2307/2788416. JSTOR 2788416.
- Mathew, John (1910). Two representative tribes of Queensland with an inquiry concerning the origin of the Australian race (PDF). London: T. Fisher Unwin.
- Mathews, R. H. (1898a). "Australian divisional systems". Journal of the Proceedings of the Royal Society of New South Wales. 32: 66–87. doi:10.5962/p.359289. S2CID 259614451.
- Mathews, R. H. (1898b). "Divisions of Queensland aborigines". Proceedings of the American Philosophical Society. 37: 327–336.
- Mathews, R. H. (October–December 1900). "The Origin, Organization and Ceremonies of the Australian Aborigines". Proceedings of the American Philosophical Society. 39 (164): 556–578. JSTOR 983776.
- Mathews, R. H. (26 November 1909). "The Kumbainggeri, Turrubul, Kaiabara and Mycoolon Tribes, Australia". Science. 30 (778): 759–760. Bibcode:1909Sci....30..759M. doi:10.1126/science.30.778.759. JSTOR 1635138. PMID 17818130.
- Mathews, R. H. (1911). "Matrilineal Descent in the Kaiabara Tribe, Queensland". Man. 11: 100–103. doi:10.2307/2839952. JSTOR 2839952.
- Tindale, Norman Barnett (1974). "Kaiabara (QLD)". Aboriginal Tribes of Australia: Their Terrain, Environmental Controls, Distribution, Limits, and Proper Names. Australian National University Press. Archived from the original on 10 February 2018.
