= YXM =

YXM or yxm may refer to:

- Yinwum dialect (ISO 639-3 code: yxm), an extinct Paman language formerly spoken on the Cape York Peninsula of Queensland, Australia
- Youxian District (Division code: YXM), a district of the city of Mianyang, Sichuan Province, China
