= Unjadi =

Australian indigenous group

The Unjadi (Unyadi) were an indigenous Australian people of the Cape York Peninsula of northern Queensland.

== Language ==
Unjadi
- Unyadi
- Native to: Australia
- Region: Cape York Peninsula, Queensland
- Ethnicity: Unjadi
- Extinct: (date missing)
- Language family: Pama–Nyungan: Paman; North Cape York; Northern; Unjadi

Language codes
- ISO 639-3: None (mis)
- Glottolog: None
- AIATSIS: Y13

According to Lauriston Sharp, the Unjadi language differed only marginally from that spoken by the neighbouring Okara.

== Country ==
The Unjadi's traditional lands, embracing some 500 square miles (1,300 km^{2}) of territory, lay around the upper Dulhunty tributary of the Ducie river as far north as the headwaters of the Jardine River.

== Social organization ==
The American anthropologist R. Lauriston Sharp described the Unjadi as belonging to what he called the Jathaikana type with regard to their totemic organization. By this he meant that the Unjadi lacked a moiety and section division. Their totemic clans were patrilineal whose totems were not normally tabu, tabus being applied rigorously only to personal totems from the mother's clan, which were assigned to male and female individuals with the onset of puberty.

== Alternative names ==
- Unyadi
- Onyengadi
- Oyungo, Oyonggo (a Tjongkandji exonym)
- Empikeno (a Jathaikana exonym)
- Umtadee (?)
- Wundjur (?)

== Sources ==
- McConnel, Ursula H. (September 1939). "Social Organization of the Tribes of Cape York Peninsula, North Queensland". Oceania. 10 (1): 54–72. doi:10.1002/j.1834-4461.1939.tb00256.x. JSTOR 40327720.
- McConnel, Ursula H. (June 1940). "Social Organization of the Tribes of Cape York Peninsula, North Queensland (Continued)". Oceania. 10 (4): 434–455. doi:10.1002/j.1834-4461.1940.tb00305.x. JSTOR 40327867.
- Parry-Okeden, William (1897). Report on the North Queensland aborigines and the native police. Edmond Gregory, government printer.
- Sharp, R. Lauriston (March 1939). "Tribes and Totemism in North-East Australia". Oceania. 9 (3): 254–275. doi:10.1002/j.1834-4461.1939.tb00232.x. JSTOR 40327744.
- Thomson, Donald Fergusson (July–December 1933). "Hero cult, initiation and totemism on Cape York Peninsula". The Journal of the Royal Anthropological Institute of Great Britain and Ireland. 63: 453–537. doi:10.2307/2843801. JSTOR 2843801.
- Thomson, Donald Fergusson (July–December 1934). "Notes on a Hero Cult from the Gulf of Carpentaria, North Queensland". The Journal of the Royal Anthropological Institute of Great Britain and Ireland. 64: 217–235. doi:10.2307/2843808. JSTOR 2843808.
- Tindale, Norman Barnett (1974). "Unjadi (QLD)". Aboriginal Tribes of Australia: Their Terrain, Environmental Controls, Distribution, Limits, and Proper Names. Australian National University. ISBN 978-0-708-10741-6.
