= Atjinuri =

Indigenous Australian people

The Atjinuri were an indigenous Australian people of the Cape York Peninsula of Queensland.

== Country ==
The Atjinuri's land covered roughly 700 square miles (1,800 km^{2}) running south along the upper Ducie River to the upper Wenlock River.

== Alternative names ==
- Adjinadi
- Itinadjana, Itinadyana, Itinadyand
- Nedgulada
- Imatjana
- ?Ulwauwudjana (Note: Tindale considered that Ursula McConnel's reference ( ) to the Ulwauwutjana (or Ebawudjena) was probably a reference to the Atjinuri.)
- Ulwadjana

== Notes ==
=== Citations ===
u

== Sources ==
- McConnel, Ursula H. (September 1939). "Social Organization of the Tribes of Cape York Peninsula, North Queensland". Oceania. 10 (1): 54–72. doi:10.1002/j.1834-4461.1939.tb00256.x. JSTOR 40327744.
- McConnel, Ursula H. (June 1940). "Social Organization of the Tribes of Cape York Peninsula, North Queensland (Continued)". Oceania. 10 (4): 434–455. doi:10.1002/j.1834-4461.1940.tb00305.x. JSTOR 40327867.
- Sharp, R. Lauriston (March 1939a). "Tribes and Totemism in North-East Australia". Oceania. 9 (3): 254–275. doi:10.1002/j.1834-4461.1939.tb00232.x. JSTOR 40327744.
- Sharp, R. Lauriston (June 1939b). "Tribes and Totemism in North-East Australia (Continued)". Oceania. 9 (4): 439–461. doi:10.1002/j.1834-4461.1939.tb00248.x. JSTOR 40327762.
- Tindale, Norman Barnett (1974). "Atjinuri (QLD)". Aboriginal Tribes of Australia: Their Terrain, Environmental Controls, Distribution, Limits, and Proper Names. Australian National University. ISBN 978-0-708-10741-6.
