= Yinwum dialect =

Extinct Paman language of Australia

Yinwum
- Native to: Australia
- Region: Cape York Peninsula, Queensland
- Ethnicity: Yinwum, ?Nyuwathayi
- Extinct: by 1960s
- Language family: Pama–Nyungan: Paman; North Cape York; Northern; Uradhi; Yinwum
- Dialects: ?Njuwadhai

Language codes
- ISO 639-3: yxm
- Glottolog: yinw1236
- AIATSIS: Y29

Yinwum is an extinct Paman language formerly spoken on the Cape York Peninsula of Queensland, Australia, by the Yinwum people. It is unknown when it became extinct, but it was no longer spoken by the 1960s. Historically, it underwent some unusual phonological changes that are difficult to classify and understand in phonetic terms.

== Phonology ==
=== Consonants ===
Consonants of Yinwum
	Peripheral		Laminal		Apical	
	Bilabial	Velar	Palatal	Dental	Alveolar	Retroflex
Nasal	m	ŋ	ɲ	n̪	n	
Prenasalised stop	ⁿp	ⁿk	ⁿc	ⁿt̪	ⁿt ⁿtʳ	
Plosive	p	k	c	t̪	t tʳ	
Fricative	β	ɣ		ð		
Vibrant					r	
Approximant	w		j		l	ɻ

/ⁿtʳ/ and /tʳ/ are post-trilled consonants (trilled affricates).

=== Vowels ===
Vowels of Yinwum
	Front	Back
High	i	u
Mid	e	
Low	a	
