= Keiadjara =

Aboriginal Australian people of Western Australia

Keiadjara, also rendered Kiyajarra, were an Aboriginal Australian people of the Pilbara region of Western Australia.

== Name ==
The name was also current among the Pitjantjatjara, but as one of their names for the Wenamba.

== Country ==
The extent of their area is unknown, but they were located southeast of the Mandjildjara territory and south and east of the Putidjara. It ran, apparently, eastwards from an otherwise unknown site called Kolajuru, a week's trek from Tjundutjundu on the Canning Stock Route. According to Ronald Berndt, the Keiadjara lived between Kumpupintil Lake and Lake Carnegie.

== Alternative names ==
- Keiatara
- Keredjara
- Kiadjara
- Giadjara
- Gijadjara
- Targudi, Tjargudi
- Djargudi, Targoodi
- Kalgoneidjara
- Kalguni

== Sources ==
- "AIATSIS map of Indigenous Australia". AIATSIS. 28 July 2023.
- "Tindale Tribal Boundaries" (PDF). Department of Aboriginal Affairs, Western Australia. September 2016. Archived from the original (PDF) on 8 March 2016.
- Berndt, Ronald M. (December 1959). "The Concept of 'The Tribe' in the Western Desert of Australia". Oceania. 30 (2): 81–107. doi:10.1002/j.1834-4461.1959.tb00213.x. JSTOR 40329194.
- Tindale, Norman Barnett (1974). "Keiadjara (WA)". Aboriginal Tribes of Australia: Their Terrain, Environmental Controls, Distribution, Limits, and Proper Names. Australian National University. ISBN 978-0-708-10741-6. Archived from the original on 20 March 2020.
- Tonkinson, Robert (1989). "Local Organisation and Land Tenure in the Karlamilyi (Rudall River) Region" (PDF). In Western Desert Working Group (ed.). The significance of the Karlamilyi Region to the Martujarra people of the Western Desert. Perth: Department of Conservation and Land Management. pp. 99–259.
