= Marijedi =

Indigenous Australian people of the Northern Territory

The Marijedi (Mariyedi) are an indigenous Australian people of the Northern Territory.

== Country ==
The Marijedi's territory, predominantly swampland, covered an estimated 200 square miles (520 km^{2}), extending westwards from Mount Greenwood, and reaching north toward Cape Scott.

== Alternative names ==
- Murijadi (a Murrinh-Patha exonym applied to the Marijedi)

== Sources ==
- Falkenberg, Johannes (1962). Kin and Totem: Group Relations of Australian Aborigines in the Port Keats District. Allen & Unwin.
- Tindale, Norman Barnett (1974). "Marijedi (NT)". Aboriginal Tribes of Australia: Their Terrain, Environmental Controls, Distribution, Limits, and Proper Names. Australian National University Press. ISBN 978-0-708-10741-6.
