= Kutjal =

Aboriginal Australian people

The Kutjal were an indigenous Australian people of Queensland of the Cape York Peninsula.

== Country ==
According to Norman Tindale, the Kutjal's tribal territories embraced roughly 4,500 square miles (12,000 km^{2}), around the Upper Staaten and middle Einasleigh rivers. Their northern frontier was in the vicinity of the Lynd River, while their southern boundary was set approximately at Lane Creek and north of Georgetown.

== Beliefs ==
According to Frederic Urquhart, who was a commissioner leading a unit of the Australian native police in the Kutjal territory, the Kutjal believed that:

unless strong preventive measures are taken, the spirits of departed members of the tribe rise from their graves and continually haunt and otherwise annoy those who are still in the flesh. Accordingly, elaborate precautions are adopted to keep the unfortunate ghosts confined in the grave which holds their mortal clay. The modus operandi is as follows
On the death of a member of the tribe, their head is cut off and the trunk placed in a grave in the usual squatting position, and covered up. A fire is then lighted on the top, in which the head is roasted; when it is thoroughly charred it is broken up into little bits amongst the hot coals, and the fire is then left to die gradually out. The theory is that the spirit rising from the grave to follow the tribe misses its head, and goes groping about to find it; but being bereft of its head, it is of course blind, and therefore, not being able to see the fire, gets burnt. This frightens it so terribly that it retires into the grave again with all expedition, and never again presumes to attempt a renewal of social intercourse with the human denizens of this world.

== Alternative names ==
- Kuritja:l
- Kutabal
- Kuthabal
- Koochulburra
- Okuntjel
- Kwearriburra (According to Tindale, possibly one of the Kutjal hordes)

== Sources ==
- Johnston, W. Ross (1990). "Frederic Charles Urquhart (1858–1935)". Urquhart, Frederic Charles (1858–1935. Australian Dictionary of Biography. Vol. 12. Melbourne University Press.
- Tindale, Norman Barnett (1974). "Kutjal (QLD)". Aboriginal Tribes of Australia: Their Terrain, Environmental Controls, Distribution, Limits, and Proper Names. Australian National University.
- Urquhart, Frederic Charles (1885). "Legends of the Australian Aborigines". The Journal of the Anthropological Institute of Great Britain and Ireland. 14: 87–88. doi:10.2307/2841487. JSTOR 2841487.
