= Milpulo =

Indigenous Australian tribe from modern day NSW

The Milpulo were an indigenous Australian tribe of New South Wales. Very little information about them has been transmitted in early accounts of their region.

== Country ==
Milpulo territory ranged over some 3,500 square miles (9,100 km^{2}). It lay to the northwest of the Darling River from Wilcannia downstream, though extending no further than probably Tandou Lake.

== People ==
The Milpulo appear to have been a back country people, living in the mallee and mulga scrublands, where water could be culled by digging down to their roots, and only coming in to the riverine area when conditions of drought were extreme. They gained a reputation for fierceness from tribes further south, who referred to them as milipulun, implying that they were regarded as "aggressive outsiders(strangers."

== Social organisation ==
According to J. W. Boultbee the Milpulo had the following class system:

Class	Totem	
Mukwara
Mukwara	Bilyara	eagle-hawk
Mukwara	Turlta	kangaroo
Mukwara	Burkunia	bandicoot
Mukwara	Uleburri	duck
Mukwara	Karni	frilled-lizard
Kilpara
Kilpara	Kulthi	emu
Kilpara	Turru	carpet-snake
Kilpara	Namba	bone-fish
Kilpara	Birnal	iguana
Kilpara	Bauanya	padi-melon
Kilpara	Yerilpari	opossum
Kilpara	Muringa	wallaby

== Mythology ==
Two myths which apparently belonged to the Milpulo. The first is an aetiological tale accounting for the creation of Lake Boolaboolka, the other recounts a tale concerning intertribal fighting near Albermarle.

== Alternative names ==
- Milpulko
- Mailpurlgu
- Mamba

== Sources ==
- Anderson, Elena Handlos (2015). Development of a Learner's Grammar for Paakantyi (PDF). School of Linguistics, Faculty of Arts and Social Sciences, University of Sydney.
- Howitt, Alfred William (1904). The native tribes of south-east Australia (PDF). Macmillan.
- Mathews, R. H. (1908a). "Folk-tales of the aborigines of New South Wales". Folklore. 19 (2): 224–227. doi:10.1080/0015587X.1908.9719826.
- Mathews, R. H. (1908b). "Folk-tales of the aborigines of New South Wales, cont". Folklore. 19 (3): 303–308. doi:10.1080/0015587X.1908.9719833.
- Pechey, W. A. (1872). "Vocabulary of the Cornu tribe". The Journal of the Anthropological Institute of Great Britain and Ireland. 1: 143–147. JSTOR 2840949.
- Tindale, Norman Barnett (1974). "Milpulo (NSW)". Aboriginal Tribes of Australia: Their Terrain, Environmental Controls, Distribution, Limits, and Proper Names. Australian National University Press. ISBN 978-0-708-10741-6.
