= Ngaliwurru people =

The Ngaliwurru are an indigenous Australian people of the Northern Territory.

== Language ==
Ngaliwurru is closely related to Jaminjung, two of the three languages of the Yirram branch of the non Pama–Nyungan languages.

== Country ==
Norman Tindale assigned to the Ngaliwurru domains a territory of roughly 6,200 square miles (16,000 km^{2}), to the southwest of the Victoria River, and south of Bradshaw. It also included Timber Creek and the treeless plateau terrain westwards beyond Limbunya, Waterloo and the West Baines River. In relatively modern times, the Ngaliwurru moving southwards took over the traditional lands of the former Tjial people.

== Alternative name ==
- Ngaliwerun

== Sources ==
- Schultze-Berndt, Eva (2006). "Sketch of a Jaminjung grammar of space". In Levinson, Stephen C.; Wilkins, David P. (eds.). Grammars of Space: Explorations in Cognitive Diversity. Cambridge University Press. pp. 63–114. ISBN 978-1-139-45839-9.
- Stanner, W. E. H. (June 1936). "A Note on Djamindjung Kinship and Totemism". Oceania. 6 (4): 441–451. doi:10.1002/j.1834-4461.1936.tb00204.x. JSTOR 40327576.
- Tindale, Norman Barnett (1974). "Ngaliwuru (NT)". Aboriginal Tribes of Australia: Their Terrain, Environmental Controls, Distribution, Limits, and Proper Names. Australian National University Press. ISBN 978-0-708-10741-6.
