= Bugulmara =

Aboriginal Australian people

The Bugulmara were an indigenous Australian people of the state of Queensland.

== Country ==
The Bugulmara were indigenous to the area near Croydon, in the vicinity of which they have been estimated to have had some 3,000 square miles (7,800 km^{2}) of territory. To their south were the Maikulan, with whom they shared strong ties.

== History of contact ==
The Bugulmara were quickly dispossessed of their lands following the mining boom that took place when gold was discovered in the area.

== Alternative names ==
- Boogoolmurra
- Balgalu (?) (Note: La Mont West provided Tindale in a personal communication with information he had garnered on a tribe called the Balgalu, and Tindale concluded that they were essentially identical with the Bugulmara.)

== Sources ==
- Tindale, Norman Barnett (1974). "Bugulmara (QLD)". Aboriginal Tribes of Australia: Their Terrain, Environmental Controls, Distribution, Limits, and Proper Names. Australian National University Press.
