= Laia people =

Indigenous people of Queensland, Australia

The Laia were an Aboriginal Australian people of the state of Queensland.

== Country ==
In Norman Tindale's estimation, the Laia had 2,100 square miles (5,400 km^{2}) of territory, ranging over the area to the north of the Palmer River, and east as far as the Great Dividing Range. Their western limits lay around the headwaters of the Alice River.

== Alternative names ==
- Koko Laia
- Kokowara (Kuku Yalanji exonym, signifying "bad speech")
- Coo-coo-warra

== Sources ==
- "AIATSIS map of Indigenous Australia". AIATSIS. 28 July 2023.
- Dutton, H. S. (1901). "Linguistics, Goa. Miorli. Coo-coowarra". Science of Man. 3 (12). Sydney: 208–209.
- Sharp, R. Lauriston (March 1939). "Tribes and Totemism in North-East Australia". Oceania. 9 (3): 254–275. doi:10.1002/j.1834-4461.1939.tb00232.x. JSTOR 40327744.
- Tindale, Norman Barnett (1974). "Laia (QLD)". Aboriginal Tribes of Australia: Their Terrain, Environmental Controls, Distribution, Limits, and Proper Names. Australian National University.
