= Kuku Bididji =

Indigenous Australian people

The Kokobididji were an indigenous Australian people of the state of Queensland.

== Country ==
Norman Tindale's estimation gives the Kokobididji 500 sq. miles of territory, from the headwaters of east Normanby River to those of the Daintree River in the south.

== Alternative names ==
- Kokobididyi
- Kokobidinji
- Gugu-bidinji
- Koko Piddaji

== Sources ==
- "AIATSIS map of Indigenous Australia". AIATSIS. 14 May 2024.
- Tindale, Norman Barnett (1974). "Kokobididji (QLD)". Aboriginal Tribes of Australia: Their Terrain, Environmental Controls, Distribution, Limits, and Proper Names. Australian National University Press. ISBN 978-0-708-10741-6.
