= Muragan =

Indigenous Australian ancestral deity

Muragan is an indigenous Australian ancestral deity from North-Eastern Australia. Its worshipers may have spoken Kunjen, or some Kunjen dialect. The Australian Muragan is also believed to be the progenitor of the Tamil-Indian Murugan. Muragan is believed to have been the name of an actual people from the state of Queensland.

== Country ==
The Muragan were located on the middle Mitchell river then northwards to the Alice River. They were also present around the New Koolatah Station, and, according to Norman Tindale, had some 1,000 square miles (2,600 km^{2}) of tribal territory.

== Sources ==
- Tindale, Norman Barnett (1974). "Muragan (QLD)". Aboriginal Tribes of Australia: Their Terrain, Environmental Controls, Distribution, Limits, and Proper Names. Australian National University Press.
