= Madoidja =

Aboriginal people in Western Australia

The Madoitja or Tjupany were an Aboriginal Australian people of Western Australia.

== Language ==
The Madoitja language was one of the Wati languages.

== Location ==
The Madoitja lands, according to an inference from contiguous areas by Norman Tindale, ranged over some 9,000 square miles (23,000 km^{2}) of territory, from east of the Three Rivers and Old Peak Hill to Lakes King and Nabberu. Their southern confines lay around Cunyu, touching on the northwestern border of Millrose. They lay north-northeast of the Wajarri.

== Alternative names ==
- Konin
- Marduidji
- Milamada
- Wainawonga
- Waula (Pini exonym meaning "northerners")

== Sources ==
- Bates, Daisy May (1913). "Aboriginal names of places". Science of Man. 14 (4). Sydney: 74–76.
- "Madoidja". AIATSIS. 26 July 2019.
- O'Grady, Geoffrey N.; Voegelin, Charles F.; Voegelin, Florence M. (1966). "Languages of the world: Indo-Pacific fasc. 6". Anthropological Linguistics. 8 (2). Bloomington: 1–197. JSTOR 30029431.
- Tindale, Norman Barnett (1974). "Madoitja (WA)". Aboriginal Tribes of Australia: Their Terrain, Environmental Controls, Distribution, Limits, and Proper Names. Australian National University Press. ISBN 978-0-708-10741-6. Archived from the original on 20 March 2020.
