= Yinwum =

Indigenous Australian people

The Yinwum, also written Jinwum, were an indigenous Australian people of the Cape York Peninsula of Queensland.

== Country ==
The Yinwum's native lands covered an extent estimated at 800 square miles (2,100 km^{2}) about the upper Wenlock River (Batavia) River south of Moreton Telegraph Station. The Nyuwathai were to their north; the Koko-Yao to their east; the Mbewum and Wikampama to their southwest, while the Ndwangit horde of the Winduwinda lay to their west, over the Cox river.

== Alternative names ==
- Jinwum
- Yeemwoon

== Sources ==
- McConnel, Ursula H. (September 1939). "Social Organization of the Tribes of Cape York Peninsula, North Queensland". Oceania. 10 (1): 54–72. doi:10.1002/j.1834-4461.1939.tb00256.x. JSTOR 40327744.
- McConnel, Ursula H. (June 1940). "Social Organization of the Tribes of Cape York Peninsula, North Queensland (Continued)". Oceania. 10 (4): 434–455. doi:10.1002/j.1834-4461.1940.tb00305.x. JSTOR 40327867.
- Tindale, Norman Barnett (1974). "Jinwum (QLD)". Aboriginal Tribes of Australia: Their Terrain, Environmental Controls, Distribution, Limits, and Proper Names. Australian National University. ISBN 978-0-708-10741-6. Archived from the original on 3 July 2017.
