= Wardal =

The Wardal were an Aboriginal Australian people of the Mid West and Goldfields-Esperance regions of Western Australia.

== Country ==
Norman Tindale calculated by inference that the Wardal's lands covered around 15,000 square miles (39,000 km^{2}), from Lake Carnegie running west and northwest to Well 11 (Goodwin Soak) on the Canning Stock Route. Their southern boundaries lay round Lake Nabberu while their westernmost extension appears to have gone as far as the Old Bald Hill Station near Beyond Bluff.

== Name ==
Wardal appears to mean 'west' and by extension, 'westerners'.

== Alternative names ==
- Tjitijamba
- Tjitjijamba
- Waula (Pini exonym bearing the sense of "northerners")

== Sources ==
- "AIATSIS map of Indigenous Australia". AIATSIS. 14 May 2024.
- "Tindale Tribal Boundaries" (PDF). Department of Aboriginal Affairs, Western Australia. September 2016. Archived from the original (PDF) on 8 March 2016.
- Tindale, Norman Barnett (1974). "Wardal (WA)". Aboriginal Tribes of Australia: Their Terrain, Environmental Controls, Distribution, Limits, and Proper Names. Australian National University Press. ISBN 978-0-708-10741-6. Archived from the original on 20 March 2020.
