= Kunandaburi =

Aboriginal Australian people

The Kunandaburi or Karendala (Garandala) were an indigenous Australian people of the state of Queensland.

== Country ==
In Norman Tindale's estimation the Karendala had tribal lands of some 3,000 square miles (7,800 km^{2}). These covered areas like Cooper Creek, and Durham Downs, and their northern limits lay around Mount Howitt. Their eastern frontier was at Plevna Downs, the McGregor Range, and in the vicinity of Eromanga.

== Alternative names ==
- ? Kurnanda-buri (Note: W.O'Donnell, cited by Alfred William Howitt.)
- Kunanda-buri

== Sources ==
- Howitt, A. W. (1884). "Remarks on the class systems collected by Mr. E. Palmer". In Palmer, Edward (ed.). Notes on Some Australian Tribes. Vol. 12. Royal Anthropological Institute of Great Britain and Ireland. pp. 335–347. doi:10.2307/2841896. JSTOR 2841896.
- Howitt, Alfred William (1904). The native tribes of south-east Australia (PDF). Macmillan.
- Mathews, R. H. (1905). "Ethnological notes on the aboriginal tribes of Queensland" (PDF). Queensland Geographical Journal. 29: 49–75.
- Tindale, Norman Barnett (1974). "Karendala (QLD)". Aboriginal Tribes of Australia: Their Terrain, Environmental Controls, Distribution, Limits, and Proper Names. Australian National University Press. ISBN 978-0-708-10741-6.
