= Kurung people =

The Kurung were identified as an indigenous Australian group of the State of Victoria by Norman Tindale. The theory that they constituted an independent tribe has been challenged with modern scholarship generally considering them a clan, associated to one of two major tribes. Their language is unconfirmed.

== Name ==
Tindale, prefacing his remarks with an admission that '(t)he triangle between Melbourne, Echuca and Albury remains one of the problem areas,' cited in support of treating the Kurung as a distinct tribal entity the material given in 1856 for the deliberation of the Legislative Council of Victoria. According to this early documentation, the Kurung were one of 5 distinct tribes in and around Melbourne, the others being the Taungurong, the Wurundjeri, the Bunurong and the Wathaurung.

Diane Barwick notes that Tindale's distinction of Kurung and Wurundjeri (Woiworrung) where the former is now subsumed under the latter, raised a Wurundjeri clan to full autonomous tribal status. He did so, she suggests, from inferences drawn on the basis of a single manuscript, the handiwork of a Protector of Aborigines William Thomas (1793-1867) This mixed vocabulary (Note: 'The 'Bacchus Marsh' list is Wathawurrung, but the list labelled ' Melbourne' has 57% agreement with Wathawurrung and only 49% agreement with the other sources for the Melbourne language. On morphological grounds it is clearly Melbourne, i.e. Woiwurrung.') was gleaned at Bacchus Marsh on the Wathaurung Marpeang-bulluk clans's territory, adjacent to the lands of the Wurundjeri Kurung-jang-baluk and Gunung-William-baluk

== Country ==
Tindale assigned to the Kurung an estimated 1,300 square miles (3,400 km^{2}) of land extending from the western side of Port Phillip Bay, between the Werribee River and Geelong and running inland up the Moorabool River as far as the Great Dividing Range. He states that inland they inhabited areas west as far as Ballarat, and Ballan. Canning and Thiele have them no further north than Sunbury.

== Alternative names ==
- Kurunjang
- Kurung-jang-baluk
- Coorong
- Jibberin (a language for the horde speaking the Bacchus Marsh dialect)
- Barabal (though used of the Kurung, according to Tindale it was used of the dominant clan et Werribee and Indented Head)
- Barrabool, Barabull
- Yawangi (referring to an endonym for the Ja:wang located in the You Yangs)
