= Andakerebina =

Indigenous Australian people of the Northern Territory

The Andakerebina were an Indigenous Australian people of the Northern Territory.

== Country ==
In Norman Tindale's mapping, the Andakerebina were assigned tribal lands of some 12,000 square miles (31,000 km^{2}), from Tarlton Range in the Northern Territory eastwards over the border with Queensland to the Toko Range. Their land took in the headwaters of the Field River, and the lower Hay River. Tindale suggested their southwestern limits lay approximately in the area of Lake Caroline.

== Alternative names ==
- Antakiripina (Iliaura exonym)
- Undekerebina
- Andeberegina (misprint?)
- Walwallie
- Willi-willi
- Yanindo

== Sources ==
- Mathews, R. H. (1899). "Divisions of tribes in the Northern Territory". Proceedings of the Royal Society of New South Wales. 33: 111–114.
- Mathews, R. H. (1901). "Ethnological notes on the aboriginal tribes of the Northern Territory". Queensland Geographical Journal. 16: 69–90.
- Roth, W. E. (1897). Ethnological Studies among the North-West-Central Queensland Aborigines (PDF). Brisbane: Edmund Gregory, Government Printer.
- Tindale, Norman Barnett (1974). "Andakerebina (NT)". Aboriginal Tribes of Australia: Their Terrain, Environmental Controls, Distribution, Limits, and Proper Names. Australian National University Press. ISBN 978-0-7081-0741-6. Archived from the original on 20 March 2020.
