= Wadere =

Indigenous Australian people

The Wadere were an indigenous Australian people of the Northern Territory.

== Country ==
The Wadere inhabited an area along the Gulf of Carpentaria, calculated by Tindale as stretching over an area of some 2,400 square miles (6,200 km^{2}), from north of Batten Creek to the Limmen Bight River and reaching inland as far as Barrkuwirriji (the Four Archers). (Note: The toponym "Four Archers" was coined by Ludwig Leichhardt to honour the four Archer brothers.) Their borders with the Marra were at the Valley of Springs.

== Alternative names ==
- Wadiri, Waderi

== Sources ==
- Reid, Gordon (1990). A Picnic with the Natives: Aboriginal-European Relations in the Northern Territory to 1910. Melbourne University Press. ISBN 978-0-522-84419-1.
- Roberts, Tony (2005). Frontier Justice: A History of the Gulf Country to 1900. University of Queensland Press. ISBN 978-0-702-24083-6.
- Tindale, Norman Barnett (1925). "Natives of Groote Eylandt and the west coast of the Gulf of Carpentaria, Parts I-II". Records of the South Australian Museum. 3: 61–102, 103–134.
- Tindale, Norman Barnett (1974). "Ngewin (NT)". Aboriginal Tribes of Australia: Their Terrain, Environmental Controls, Distribution, Limits, and Proper Names. Australian National University. ISBN 978-0-708-10741-6.
