= Kuwarranyji =

Indigenous Australian people

The Kwarandji are an indigenous Australian people of the Northern Territory.

== Language ==
The Kuwarranyji speak a dialect of the Mudburra language.

== Country ==
In Norman Tindale's estimation, the Kuwarranyji's lands extended over some 7,500 square miles (19,000 km^{2}), taking in the district of Daly Waters, reaching westwards to the vicinity of Illawarra Springs and Mount Wollaston. The southern quarter went as far south as Newcastle Waters on the Sturt Plateau. They lived north of the Tjingili.

== Alternative names ==
- Kwaranjee
- Kooringee
- Coorinji
- Goarango
- Gurindji

== Sources ==
- "C35: Kuwarranyji". AUSTLANG. 26 July 2019. Archived from the original on 2023-03-06.
- Tindale, Norman Barnett (1974). "Kwarandji (NT)". Aboriginal Tribes of Australia: Their Terrain, Environmental Controls, Distribution, Limits, and Proper Names. Australian National University Press. ISBN 978-0-708-10741-6. Archived from the original on 20 March 2020.
