= Bingongina =

The Bingongina or Pinkangarna are a possible indigenous Australian people of the Northern Territory. However, the name may simply be a former alternative term for Mudburra.

== Country ==
According to Norman Tindale's estimate, the Bingongina's tribal territory, covering much sand dune desert terrain, encompassed approximately 9,700 square miles (25,000 km^{2}) to the west of Lake Woods and east of the upper Victoria River. The southwestern boundary lay at Winnecke Creek (Morerinju).

== Social organization ==
The Bingongina marriage system was claimed to exhibit patrilineal descent by Spencer and Gillen in 1904, analyzing the class relations in terms of two moieties, respectively Wiliuku and Liaraku. This view challenged by R. H. Mathews who asserted that the cycles actually allowed for matrilineal descent.

== Alternative names ==
- Bugongidja (exonym used by northern tribes)

== Sources ==
- Langham, K. (2012). The Building of British Social Anthropology: W.H.R. Rivers and his Cambridge Disciples in The Development of Kinship Studies, 1898–1931. Springer Science & Business Media. ISBN 978-9-400-98464-6.
- Mathews, R. H. (1908). "Matrilineal Descent, Northern Territory". Man. 8: 150–152. doi:10.2307/2840262. JSTOR 2840262.
- Spencer, Sir Baldwin; Gillen, Francis J. (1904). Northern Tribes of Central Australia (PDF). Macmillan Publishers.
- Tindale, Norman Barnett (1974). "Bingongina (NT)". Aboriginal Tribes of Australia: Their Terrain, Environmental Controls, Distribution, Limits, and Proper Names. Australian National University Press. ISBN 978-0-708-10741-6. Archived from the original on 20 March 2020.
