= Nangatara =

Aboriginal Australian people of Western Australia

The Nangatara are an Aboriginal Australian people of Western Australia.

== Country ==
The Nangatara ranged over some 13,800 square miles (36,000 km^{2}) of territory, northwest of the Canning Stock Route, mainly between Lake Wooloomber and a place called Kuljai, a well (no.48) mapped for that area. Their northwestern boundary lay halfway between the Percival Lakes and Joanna Springs.

== Lifestyle ==
Given the scarcity of water, with only some available in distant wells and rock catchment areas, when drought struck, the Nangatara would trek to Karbardi, south of Adverse Well. The heartland of their territory was Rama, a type of hard gravel plain which they called laribuka.

== History ==
Even before contact with whites, the Nangatara were pushing northwards along the Canning Stock Route, as the Walmadjari withdrew from that part of their territory.

== Alternative names ==
- Nangadjara
- Njangadjara
- Julbaritja (an exonym of the Njangamarda and Mangala, meaning 'southerners')
- Yulbari-dja, Julbaridja
- Ilbaridja
- Nanidjara (scornful term of abuse used by the Wanman people for them, just as other tribes applied it also the Wanman)
- Nangi
- Mangai
- Mangi

== Sources ==
- "AIATSIS map of Indigenous Australia". AIATSIS. 14 May 2024.
- "Tindale Tribal Boundaries" (PDF). Department of Aboriginal Affairs, Western Australia. September 2016. Archived from the original (PDF) on 8 March 2016.
- Petri, Helmut (August 1955a). "Frobenius-Expedition nach Nordwest-Australien 1953-1955 (Kurzer Reisebericht)". Paideuma: Mitteilungen zur Kulturkunde (in German). 6 (2). Frobenius Institute: 92–94. JSTOR 40341215.
- Petri, Helmut (August 1955b). "Dynamik im Stammesleben Nordwest-Australiens". Paideuma: Mitteilungen zur Kulturkunde (in German). 6 (3). Frobenius Institute: 152–168. JSTOR 40341221.
- Tindale, Norman Barnett (1974). "Nangatara (WA)". Aboriginal Tribes of Australia: Their Terrain, Environmental Controls, Distribution, Limits, and Proper Names. Australian National University. ISBN 978-0-708-10741-6. Archived from the original on 20 March 2020.
- Worms, Ernest Ailred (September–December 1951). "Review: Das Schwirrholz. Eine Untersuchung über die Verbreitung und Bedeutung der Schwirren im Kult by Otto Zerries". Anthropos. 46 (5/6). Anthropos Institut: 1018–1020. JSTOR 40449557.
