= Djalakuru =

Indigenous Australian people of the Northern Territory

The Djalakuru were an indigenous Australian people of the Northern Territory.

== Country ==
Little is known of the Djalakuru, and the extent of their land is inferred as the residue of what is unaccounted for when one has mapped the other historic tribal territories. On this principle, Norman Tindale deduced that they held sway over about 600 square miles (1,600 km^{2}), along the coastal areas from west of Goulburn Island at Angularli Creek roughly to the vicinity of Malay Bay near Mountnorris Bay.

== People ==
The only account we have of the Djalakuru comes from an overview of the Cobourg Peninsula written by George Windsor Earl in 1846.

== Alternative name ==
- Jalakuru

== Sources ==
- Earl, G. Windsor (1846). "On the Aboriginal Tribes of the Northern Coast of Australia". The Journal of the Royal Geographical Society of London. 16: 239–251. doi:10.2307/1798232. JSTOR 1798232.
- Tindale, Norman Barnett (1974). "Djalakuru (NT)". Aboriginal Tribes of Australia: Their Terrain, Environmental Controls, Distribution, Limits, and Proper Names. Australian National University. ISBN 978-0-708-10741-6. Archived from the original on 20 March 2020.
