= Ngurawola =

Aboriginal Australian people

The Ngurawola were an Aboriginal Australian people of the state of Queensland.

== Country ==
According to Norman Tindale, the Ngurawola's tribal lands covered some 4,400 square miles (11,000 km^{2}), centered around Arrabury and the Durham Downs. Their southern boundaries lay around Lake Marrakoonamooka, while their western limits were near the Coongie Lakes.

== Alternative name ==
- Ngandanina (?) (Note: The linguist Gavan Breen recorded this word durting field work at Arrabury, but it is not known whether it is a variant Ngurawola ethnonym or a word denoting the language they spoke.)

== Sources ==
- Tindale, Norman Barnett (1974). "Ngurawola (QLD)". Aboriginal Tribes of Australia: Their Terrain, Environmental Controls, Distribution, Limits, and Proper Names. Australian National University Press.
