= Wenamba =

Indigenous people of Western Australia

The Wenamba are an Aboriginal Australian people of the central eastern edge of Western Australia in the Goldfields Region.

== Language ==
The Wenamba spoke a dialect similar to that of the Pintupi.

== Country ==
The Wenamba ranged over an estimated 10,000 square miles (26,000 km^{2}). Norman Tindale places them to the north of the Rawlinson Ranges and Lake Neale and Lake Hopkins, extending northwards to the area of Lake Macdonald. Their western limits are set at a place called Kurultu/Kurultja, believed to be somewhere around the Baron Range.

== People ==
The Wenamba, though tribally distinct, were closely affiliated to the Pintupi. The Pitjantjatjara name for them was A:wuntara, from their word a:wu, meaning 'yes', implying that they were 'yes people' since they were said to reply to any and every inquiry by responding in the affirmative. The Wenamba were one of several desert tribes known generically as Kalgonei/Kalgoneidjara, One telling term used of them, Mangawara, meant 'chignon bearers' referring to their dressing their hair in buns, which in turn served to hold some of their possessions.

== History ==
The police ranger Walter MacDougall was the first white man known to have contact with the Wenamba. While camping one night near the Rawlinson Ranges, his attention was drawn to a shuffling noise, and he looked up and noticed a little native girl quietly walking towards the campfire. He broke the tension by remarking in Pitjantjatjara on the tjilka (prickly) bush tomato seeds strewn over the ground made walking barefoot difficult. At that point, the Wenamba father drew near, his hands splayed to show he carried no weapons. The "drifters" spoke a dialect distinct from Ngadadjara and Pitjantjatjara, though they could understand the latter. With an amicable rapport established, the father then fetched his three-barbed spear, unlike the single barb deployed by the other two tribes.

In 1950, some Wenamba were reported to have moved over to the Northern Territory to settle at the Yuendumu Government Station, and, after a further stay at Haasts Bluff to have upped stakes and moved back to their traditional lands, preferring to return to their nomadic ways.

== Alternative names ==
- Wenanba
- Wankawinan (Pitjantjatjara exonym)
- Kalgonei (a Ngadadjara term for the dialect they spoke)
- Wanudjara Ngadadjara
- Pintularapi (a vulgar term applied indiscriminately to both the Pintupi and Wenamba by the Ngadadjara)
- Mangawara
- Kalguni?
- Widanda
- Tjurti (Pintupi exonym)

== Sources ==
- "AIATSIS map of Indigenous Australia". AIATSIS. 14 May 2024.
- "Tindale Tribal Boundaries" (PDF). Department of Aboriginal Affairs, Western Australia. September 2016. Archived from the original (PDF) on 8 March 2016.
- Berndt, Ronald M. (December 1960). "The Concept of 'The Tribe' in the Western Desert of Australia". Oceania. 30 (2): 81–107. doi:10.1002/j.1834-4461.1959.tb00213.x. JSTOR 40329194.
- Tindale, Norman Barnett (1974). "Wenamba (WA)". Aboriginal Tribes of Australia: Their Terrain, Environmental Controls, Distribution, Limits, and Proper Names. Australian National University. ISBN 978-0-708-10741-6. Archived from the original on 20 March 2020.
