= Ngomburr =

Aboriginal Australian people of the Northern Territory

The Ngormburr, also known as Murumburr and other variants, are an Aboriginal Australian people of the Northern Territory.

== Country ==
The Ngormbur are thought to have had approximately 800 mi^{2} (2,100 km^{2}) of land located between the West and South Alligator rivers, with an inland extension that ran as far as Bamboo Creek.

The area is now in Kakadu National Park, and the people are part of a group to whom native title was granted in March 2022.

== Language ==
Their language was or is the Ngormbur language.

== Alternative names ==
- Ngorm-bur
- Ngumbu
- Gnornbur
- Ngorbur
- Oormbur
- Corm-bur
- Koarnbut
- Ambukuda
- Ambugula
- Numbugala
- Nambuguja

== Sources ==
- Spencer, Baldwin (1914). Native tribes of the Northern Territory of Australia (PDF). London: Macmillan Publishers.
- Spencer, Baldwin (1928). Wanderings in wild Australia (PDF). London: Macmillan Publishers.
- Tindale, Norman Barnett (1974). "Ngormbur (NT)". Aboriginal Tribes of Australia: Their Terrain, Environmental Controls, Distribution, Limits, and Proper Names. Australian National University.
