= Wirdinya =

Aboriginal Australian people

The Wirdinja were an Aboriginal Australian people of the Pilbara region of Western Australia.

== Country ==
Wirdinya lands encompassed according to Norman Tindale's calculations, some 6,200 square miles (16,000 km^{2}), from the Robertson Range as far west as Ophthalmia Range. Their eastern frontier, which is not precisely defined, lay in the area of Savoury Creek. Mundiwindi, Jigalong, Murramunda, and Sylvania all formed part of their territory. Their southern limits ran down to the headwaters of the Ashburton and Ethel Rivers.

== Alternative names ==
- Jabura ('north')
- Mardo ('initiated man', i.e. people who practised both circumcision and subincision)
- Wirdinja
- Woordinya

Source: Tindale 1974, p. 261

== Sources ==
- "AIATSIS map of Indigenous Australia". AIATSIS. 14 May 2024.
- "Tindale Tribal Boundaries" (PDF). Department of Aboriginal Affairs, Western Australia. September 2016. Archived from the original (PDF) on 8 March 2016.
- Tindale, Norman Barnett (1974). "Wirdinja (WA)". Aboriginal Tribes of Australia: Their Terrain, Environmental Controls, Distribution, Limits, and Proper Names. Australian National University. ISBN 978-0-708-10741-6. Archived from the original on 20 March 2020.
