= Djowei =

Indigenous Australian people

The Djowei are an indigenous Australian people of the Northern Territory.

== Country ==
The Djowei had an estimated 1,700 square miles (4,400 km^{2}) of tribal land consisting of some 1,200 square miles (3,100 km^{2}) inland east of the Adelaide River. They lay between the Awarai and Djerimanga.

== Alternative names ==
- Kumertuo, a name shared with the Jawoyn.

== Sources ==
- Spencer, Baldwin (1914). Native tribes of the Northern Territory of Australia (PDF). London: Macmillan Publishers.
- Tindale, Norman Barnett (1974). "Djowei (NT)". Aboriginal Tribes of Australia: Their Terrain, Environmental Controls, Distribution, Limits, and Proper Names. Australian National University. ISBN 978-0-708-10741-6. Archived from the original on 20 March 2020.
