= Lake Nabberu =

- Location in Western Australia
- Interactive map of Lake Nabberu
- Location: Mid West, Western Australia
- Coordinates: 25°33′37″S 120°15′31″E
- Type: Salt lake
- Primary inflows: Kennedy Creek
- Basin countries: Australia
- Surface area: 180 km^{2} (69 sq mi)

Lake Nabberu is a large salt lake in the Mid West region of Western Australia. It extends into the centre of the Shoemaker crater. The edges of the lake are surrounded by low dune ridges, which support meager vegetation growth.

The lack has an area of 18,000 hectares (44,000 acres). The closest major settlements are the towns of Wiluna and Meekatharra.

== See also ==
- List of lakes of Australia § Western Australia
