= Journal of the Royal Anthropological Institute =

- Discipline: Anthropology
- Language: English
- Edited by: Hannah Knox, Adam Reed, Chika Watanabe, Thomas Yarrow

Publication details
- Former name: Man
- History: 1901–present
- Publisher: Wiley-Blackwell on behalf of the Royal Anthropological Institute
- Frequency: Quarterly
- Impact factor: 1.473 (2017)

Standard abbreviations
- ISO 4: J. R. Anthropol. Inst.

Indexing
- ISSN: 1359-0987 (print); 1467-9655 (web)
- LCCN: 95660943
- JSTOR: 13590987
- OCLC no.: 69372347
- Man
- ISSN: 0025-1496

Links
- Journal homepage; Online access; Online archive; Journal page at publisher's website

The Journal of the Royal Anthropological Institute (JRAI) is the principal journal of the oldest anthropological organization in the world, the Royal Anthropological Institute of Great Britain and Ireland. Articles, at the forefront of the discipline, range across the full spectrum of anthropology, embracing all fields and areas of inquiry – from sociocultural, biological, and archaeological, to medical, material and visual. The JRAI is also acclaimed for its extensive book review section, and it publishes a bibliography of books received.

== History ==
The journal was established in 1901 as Man and obtained its current title in 1995, with volume numbering restarting at 1. For its first sixty-three volumes from its inception in 1901 up to 1963 it was issued on a monthly basis, moving to bimonthly issues for the years 1964–1965. From March 1966 until its last issue in December 1994, it was published quarterly as a "new series", with a new sequence of volume numbers (1–29).

In 1965, Man absorbed The Journal of the Royal Anthropological Institute of Great Britain and Ireland, which was known as The Journal of the Anthropological Institute of Great Britain and Ireland from 1872 to 1906.

== Abstracting and indexing ==
The journal is abstracted and indexed in:

- Academic Search
- Biological Abstracts
- CSA Biological Sciences Database
- CSA Environmental Sciences & Pollution Management Database
- Current Contents/Social & Behavioral Sciences
- Embase
- Expanded Academic ASAP
- FRANCIS
- InfoTrac
- Linguistics & Language Behavior Abstracts
- ProQuest
- Social Sciences Citation Index
- SocINDEX
- Sociological Abstracts

According to the Journal Citation Reports, the journal has a 2017 impact factor of 1.473, ranking 31st out of 85 in the category "Anthropology".
