= Ursula McConnel =

Australian anthropologist

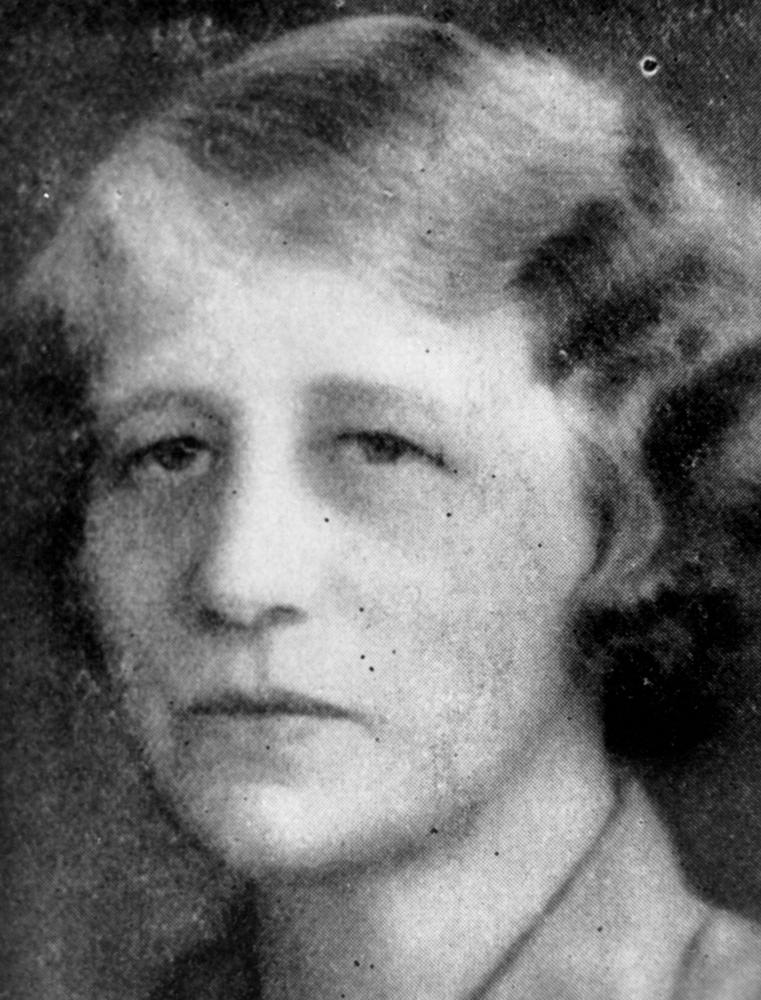
- Ursula McConnel, Queensland, approx 1938
- Born: 27 October 1888; Cressbrook, Queensland
- Died: 6 November 1957 (aged 69); Kelvin Grove, Queensland
- Citizenship: Australian
- Education: University of Sydney
- Known for: Work with Wik Mungkan people, Cape York Peninsula
- Scientific career
- Fields: Australian anthropology

Ursula Hope McConnel (1888–1957) was a Queensland anthropologist and ethnographer best remembered for her work with, and the records she made of, the Wik Mungkan people of Cape York Peninsula.

First trained at University College London, then supervised by Professor Alfred Radcliffe-Brown in the Department of Anthropology, University of Sydney, McConnel was one of the first women to be trained in anthropology and then go out to observe Aboriginal Australians in remote areas, systematically documenting, recording, and describing their culture, mythology, beliefs, and way of life.

== Early life ==
Born on a grazing property called "Cressbrook" (near Toogoolawah, Queensland), Ursula McConnel was the eighth child (fifth daughter) of grazier James Henry McConnel and his wife, Mary Elizabeth McConnel (née Kent).

Raised on the Cressbrook property in what has been described as an "austere" and "repressed" family environment, she was:

"Striking in looks, brilliant in intellectual gifts, she passed through Brisbane High School for Girls and New England Girls' School at Armidale, garlanded with prizes, before taking first-class honours in philosophy at the University of Queensland

Ursula McConnell has been described as a brave, free-thinking, open questing woman with sometimes strong emotions, growing up at a time when the first wave of feminism n Australia was coming of age: " .. a perfect test case for the various ideas of self-creation .." who also, during troubled times studying, came under the shaping influence of her brother-in-law and psychologist Elton Mayo, husband of her sister Dorothea McConnel:

"She was a student of herself [and] believed the human mind could not only be probed and subjected to intensive study through its social context but that its individual workings could be analysed and known in depth"

She was once engaged, never married, and being financially secure in her investments in wool bonds, devoted her life to her anthropological research endeavours in Western Cape York Peninsula, driven by a strong sense of duty and justice to the people with whom she had worked.

== Education ==
At New England Girls' School she received prizes in singing and languages. From ages 17 to 19 she attended courses in history, politics, literature, and music at King's College London. By the age of 20 she completed and attained a first-class honours in philosophy and psychology at the University of Queensland.

At the age of 35 she commenced a doctorate in anthropology at University College London, but, lonely, stressed, and ill she returned to Australia in 1927 without completing her doctorate. On her return, under Professor Alfred Radcliffe-Brown (University of Sydney) she started doing ethnographic research amongst the Wik Mungkan people, Cape York Peninsula.

== Career ==
Between 1927 and 1934 McConnel undertook five field trips into the Cape, and published numerous articles plus a book (entitled Myths of the Munkan) mostly about the Wik Mungkan people, and the Aboriginal Australians of Cape York generally. During this period she was also awarded a Rockefeller fellowship (1931–33) to study under Edward Sapir at Yale University, in the United States of America. Her series of articles in Walkabout magazine in 1936 promoted her research, and her concern over the treatment by government and missions of aboriginal people, to the general public.

She attempted to obtain a doctorate in anthropology from University College, London, by submitting her publications, but, in the end, never obtained that doctorate, though still laying a significant foundation for present day anthropological research amongst the Aboriginal peoples of the region.

== Bibliography ==
- (1926) Social organization of tribes of Cape York Peninsula Oceania—1939, 1940; v.10, no.1, no.4; [54]- 72, [434]–455
- (2, 3, 4, 7, 8, 9, 11, 12 May 1928) Wikmunkan people of Gulf of Carpentaria: Series of nine articles telling of experiences on an anthropological expedition up the Archer River, Gulf of Carpentaria;
- (1930) The Rainbow-serpent in North Queensland: Report of yero amongst Koka-Yalunyu tribe in Daintree and Bloomfield River region
- (1931) A moon legend from the Bloomfield River, North Queensland: A creation myth with explanatory analysis originally part of initiation ceremony
- (1933) The Symbol in legend: Comparative study of variations from a common type of culture; Examples from Wik-Munkan, Koko- Yulunyu, Koko-Yimidir kinship system and terms
- (1927–1928, & 1934) Material culture and ceremonies at North-West Cape York: 120 photographs taken during Ursula McConnel's field research.
- (1935) Legends and ritual: paper read before A.N.Z.A.A.S., Melb,
- (1935) Junior marriage systems : comparative survey: Survey of Cape York Peninsula
- (1936) Totemic hero-cults in Cape York Peninsula, North Queensland: totemic culture of Wikmunkan and neighbouring tribes
- (1936) Cape York Peninsula: the Civilised Foreground, Walkabout, June 1936, 16–19
- (1936) Cape York Peninsula: The Primitive Playgound, Walkabout, July 1936, 10–15
- (1936) Cape York Peninsula: Development and Control, Walkabout, August 1936, 36–40
- (1937) Mourning ritual among the tribes of Cape York Peninsula:
- (1937) Illustration of the myth of Shiveri and Nyunggu: Brief outline of story of two hero cults plus diagram of story places
- (1945) The Wik-munkan tribe of Cape York Peninsula Oceania—1930, 1930, 1934; v.1, no.1, no.2, v.4, no.3; [97]–104, [181]–205, [310]–367
- (1945) Wikmunkan phonetics: Survey of phonetics from recordings made in 1934 to obtain cultural information. Oceania—1945; v.15, no.4; [353]–375
- (1953) Native arts and industries on the Archer, Kendall, and Holroyd rivers, Cape York Peninsula, North Queensland Records of the South Australian Museum Vol. 11, no.1 (1953)
- (1957) Myths of the Mungkan Melbourne. Melbourne University Press: Explanatory matter relates myths and stories to way of life and psychology of Wik-Munggan in Archer, Holroyd, and Edward river area

== Newspaper articles ==
- "Girl Anthropologist: Cape York studies"
- Courier Mail (11 September 1933) "Studies Among Natives -Miss Ursula McConnel's Work" Accessed 30 April 2010
- Courier Mail (30 September 1933) "Social Life Study: Miss Ursula McConnell's Address" Accessed 30 April 2010
- Courier Mail (22 December 1933) "In Town and Out: Miss Ursula McConnel a noted anthropologist .. is one of a small group of Australian anthropologists who are doing hard field work among the natives Accessed 30 April 2010
- Sydney Morning Herald (8 March 1934) "Science: Adventures in Anthropology by Ursula McConnell Accessed 30 April 2010
