= Oceania (journal) =

- Discipline: Anthropology
- Language: English
- Edited by: Jadran Mimica, Nancy Williams

Publication details
- History: 1930-present
- Publisher: Wiley-Blackwell for Oceania Publications, University of Sydney Faculty of Arts and Social Sciences
- Frequency: Triannually
- Impact factor: 0.394 (2012)

Standard abbreviations
- ISO 4: Oceania

Indexing
- ISSN: 0029-8077 (print); 1834-4461 (web)
- LCCN: 38017490
- OCLC no.: 743341967

Links
- Journal homepage; Online access; Online archive

Oceania is a triannual peer-reviewed academic journal that was established in 1930. It covers social and cultural anthropology of the peoples of Oceania, including Australia, Melanesia, Polynesia, Micronesia, and Southeast Asia. The journal publishes research papers as well as review articles, correspondence, and shorter comments.

Occasionally, a special issue is devoted to a single topic, comprising thematically connected collections of papers prepared by a guest editor.

The journal is published by Wiley-Blackwell and the editors-in-chief are Jadran Mimica (University of Sydney) and Sally Babidge (University of Queensland). Past editors include Alfred Radcliffe-Brown, Adolphus Peter Elkin, Raymond Firth and Nancy Williams.
