= ANU Press =

University publisher

ANU Press (or Australian National University Press; originally ANU E Press) is a new university press (NUP) that publishes open-access books, textbooks and journals. It was established in 2004 to explore and enable new modes of scholarly publishing. In 2014, ANU E Press changed its name to ANU Press to reflect the changes the publication industry had seen since its foundation.

== History ==
ANU Press was Australia's first primarily electronic academic publisher.

ANU Press justified its foundation by mentioning the desire to publish scholarly works that would not necessarily gain profit, and the belief that online publishing was a viable alternative to traditional academic publishing that overcame the inaccessibility, costs, and requirements for setup that were inherent in traditional publishing.

== Activities ==
ANU Press produces on average 50–60 fully peer-reviewed research publications each year, and maintains a website featuring over 700 recent and back-list titles. It is recognised by the Department of Industry as a commercial publisher, enabling ANU Press authors to gain full recognition under the Higher Education Research Data Collection scheme.

Nearly all books and journals published by the Press are available in PDF, epub, mobi and HTML formats. All works are also available to purchase in hard copy through a Print-on-Demand (PoD) service.

ANU Press is multidisciplinary; it has 24 subject-specific editorial boards to evaluate monograph submissions and publishes 10 journals covering a wide range of disciplines. In order to ensure that the Press publishes only high-quality academic books, each submission goes through a rigorous selection process including evaluation by the relevant editorial board, a double-blind peer-review process, revision following reviewers' reports and final approval by the board. This process ensures that the research is current, relevant and an important contribution to the field.

=== Imprints ===
As well as its titular imprint, ANU Press publishes work under two additional imprints: ANU eView and ANU eText. ANU Press is the imprint under which all peer-reviewed monographs, multi-author works, edited works, serials and journals are published.

ANU eView was established in 2009. ANU eView publishes a range of materials including conference papers, student journals, republications of important academic works and other internally referred University material. ANU eText was launched in 2013, and provides an open access option for ANU academics looking to develop and distribute their textbooks.

=== Co-publishers ===
ANU Press has co-publishing agreements with a number of organisations including: the Australian Centre on China in the World; the Centre for Aboriginal Economic Policy Research; the Australian and New Zealand School of Government; Charles Darwin University; Aboriginal History Inc.; and Social Sciences Academic Press (China).

== Open Access ==
All research published by ANU Press is available through Open Access, which allows it to be disseminated free of charge to readers all around the world.

== Journal publications ==
ANU Press publishes or co-publishes a number of academic journals, including:

- Aboriginal History
- Agenda
- "ANU Historical Journal II". ANU Historical Journal II (1). ANU Press. 2019. ISSN 2652-0281. "The first revived issue of the ANUHJ II is edited by Emily Gallagher, Jessica Urwin and Madalyn Grant. It is jointly sponsored by the College of Arts and Social Sciences and the College of Asia and the Pacific... It is a revival of the ANU Historical Journal (1964–87)"
- Australian Journal of Biography and History
- East Asia Forum Quarterly
- Human Ecology Review
- International Review of Environmental History

== See also ==
- Pacific Linguistics
