= Yuwibara =

Aboriginal Australian people

The Yuwibara, also written Yuibera and Juipera and also known as Yuwi, after their language, are an Aboriginal Australian people, originating from the area around present-day Mackay, on the east coast of Queensland, Australia.

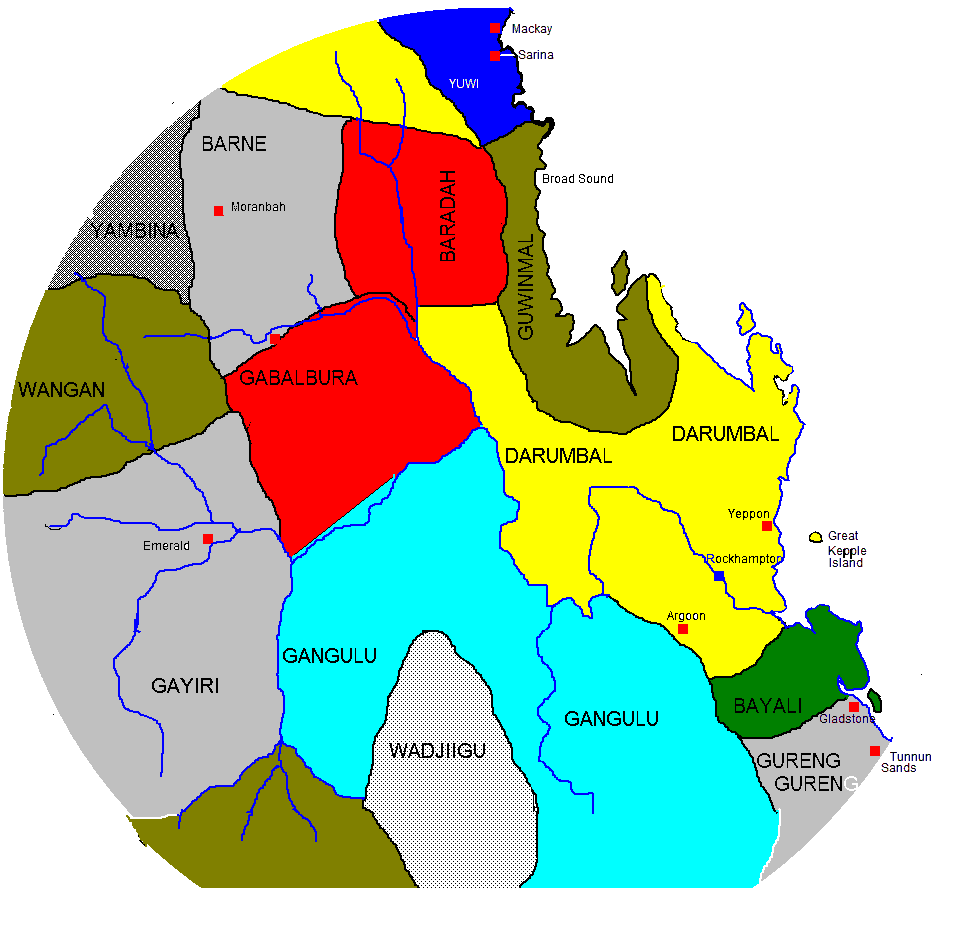
Traditional lands of various Australian Aboriginal tribes around Gladstone

== Country ==
According to Norman Tindale's classification, the Yuibera lands, starting from Mackay, were calculated to encompass roughly 1,100 square miles (2,800 km^{2}), ran from St. Helens south to Cape Palmerston and inland reached as far as the Connors Range. The Gia were to their north; the Biri in the area northwest of them; Wiri lay on their western flank, and beyond them the Barna. To their south were the Barada and, along the coast, the Koinjmal. The Yuibera were restricted to the coastal end of the Pioneer Valley, and were one of four peoples within 84 kilometres (52 mi) of Mackay.

== History ==
=== Before European contact ===
In Mackay and its surrounding areas, six peoples have been identified: other than the Yuwibara, these were the Wiri, Biria, Jangga, Barna and Barada, with each group estimated to have consisted of 500 members. The Yuwibara people are said to have been the most dominant group in the area, occupying what is now Mackay City, the coast from St. Helens to Cape Palmerston and further inland to the Connor's Range. Boundaries were marked by natural features and punishment for incurring on other groups' territories was severe.

What is now known as Cape Hillsborough was and remains of particular significance for the Yuwibara people. Firstly, it was a hunting and gathering ground for food, which is still apparent in archaeological remains today. For instance, shellfish were collected from the mangroves, roasted over fires and the shells discarded in piles over the course of many years, forming middens, the oldest of which are up to 500 years old. Other remains include a stone fish trap, stone fireplaces, pieces of ochre from other areas as well as stone axe heads. Secondly, Cape Hillsborough is significant because boys were trained and initiated into manhood at the stone fish trap. Thirdly, the ground adjacent to Cape Hillsborough Resort is a burial ground, not only for the Yuwibara, but also for South Sea Islanders, and is thus sacred ground.

Other locations of significance to the Yuwibara people include, for instance, the Kommo Toera Trail, a Melaleuca forest located in wetlands where food was gathered. Special ceremonies are also said to have been performed on the ocean-side of Mount Blackwood, which would later be a vantage point for spotting the Native Police. Stone fish traps can also be found at Slade Point, Reliance Creek, Ball Bay, Woodwark Bay, Adelaide Point, Hay Point, Llewellyn Bay as well as on West Hill Island, Green Island, Rabbit Island, South Repulse Island and other places.

Trade with the Ngaro people in the nearby islands has also been documented. Billy Moogerah, who was the last Aboriginal person to live in the Whitsunday Islands, used to canoe from the islands to Cape Palmerston, making stops along the way for trade in Cape Hillsborough and Freshwater Point. However, Moogerah was removed from the islands when Bowen township was first settled.

=== European contact ===
The Mackay area began to be occupied by the British around 1860. They failed to recognise the tribal boundaries and hunting rights of the local groups. Faced with starvation, the local Yuwibara started hunting the settlers' livestock, which resulted in deadly conflict.

It was estimated by contemporary local observers George Bridgman (Note: This is the spelling used by Moore. Curr transcribed the name as Bridgeman, and Tindale uses both spellings.) and Pierre-Marie Bucas that in the decade from 1850 to 1860 roughly 50% percent of the original Aboriginal population of the Pioneer Valley had been killed. The Native Mounted Police were considered the major cause, shooting down the local population in the ongoing frontier wars, but introduced diseases also played a key role. The general trend in the Mackay area was described lightheartedly by the aristocratic Harold Finch-Hatton:

Alas for the greediness of the savage ! alas for the cruelty of his white brother ! The rations contained about as much strychnine as anything else, and not one of the mob escaped. When they awoke in the morning they were all dead corpses. More than a hundred Blacks were stretched out by this ruse of the owner of the Long Lagoon. In a dry season, when the water sinks low, their skulls are occasionally to be found half buried in the mud. As a rule, however, few people are ambitious of indulging in such wholesale slaughter, and, when the Blacks are troublesome, it is generally considered sufficient punishment to go out and shoot one or two.

Writing in 1908, the early ethnographer Henry Ling Roth stated that: "in the Mackay district at any rate, the aborigines, if not all exterminated, have at least, through European influence, lost all knowledge of their old laws and customs".

== Language ==
The Yuwi language, probably a dialect of Biri or one of its dialects, Wiri, if it was distinct at all, was recorded as having no speakers left, but since the 2010s work has been done to revive knowledge of the language from what remains in the early records.

== Culture ==
The spiritual connection of the Yuwibara people with Cape Hillsborough continues to the present, and men's ceremonies are still performed along the mangrove boardwalk. Mount Jukes, too, was home to a men's ceremonial site, which is still visited each year by Yuwibara elders, who speak of a large spirit walking around the camping grounds.

== Food ==
While Yuwibara women specialised in hunting freshwater turtles in the wetlands and swamps, the men would hunt sea turtles and dugong in the sea grass of the shore of Cape Hillsborough. The fat of dugong was mixed with wax to form glue for spears. Moreover, fish, mud crabs, snakes, wallabies and brush turkeys formed an important part of their diet. Many different fruits were also eaten, including those from the Randia fitzalanii (native gardenia) and Mimusops elengi (Tanjong tree).

== Utilisation of other natural products ==
- The bark of the Melaleuca viridiflora (broad-leafed tea tree) was used to build huts while the leaves were bruised in water which was then ingested for medicinal purposes.
- The wood of the Acacia aulacocarpa (hickory wattle) was used to make digging sticks and spears while its seeds were used to make flour.
- The Xanthorrhoea semiplana (grass tree) was used to make spear shafts and to start fires while its flowers were used to sweeten drinks.
- The wood of the Corymbia dallachiana (ghost gum) burns well in wet conditions and was thus often used as firewood while its sap was used for medicinal purposes.
- While the fruit of the Exocarpos latifolius (native cherry) was eaten, the wood and bark was burnt to repel mosquitoes.
- The wood of the Flindersia schottiana (silver ash) was used to manufacture tools.
- While the fruit of the Elaeocarpus grandis (blue quandong) was eaten, its seeds were also used for decoration and its buttress roots were used to make shields and paddles.
- The bark of the Alstonia scholaris (milky pine) was ground to a powder which was then used as a glue to attach feathers to skin for ceremonies.
- The fruit of the Morinda citrifolia (cheese fruit) was used for medicinal purposes while its roots were used for weaving or as string and its leaves were used to wrap up food for cooking.
- The fruit of the Terminalia sericocarpa (damson) was eaten while other parts of the plant were used as fish poison.
- While the fruit of the Ficus racemosa (cluster fig) was edible, the sap was used to relieve diarrhoea.
- The stems of the Flagellaria indica (supple jack) were split and used for sewing and fibre while other parts were used for medicinal purposes.

== Burial customs ==
The Yuwibara and other Mackay area tribes are said by early ethnographers to have called a man's spirit meeglo, and to have used the term to describe the first whites they encountered, believing them to be embodiments of their forefathers. An informant of Robert Brough Smyth and resident in Mackay, George Bridgman, noted with regard to area's tribal burial customs that:

he heard a funeral oration delivered over the grave of a man who had been a great warrior which lasted more than an hour. The corpse was borne on the shoulders of two men, who stood at the edge of the grave. During the discourse he observed that the orator spoke to the deceased as if he were still living and could hear his words. Burial in the district in which Mr. Bridgman lives is only a formal ceremony, and not an absolute disposal of the remains. After lying in the ground for three months or more, the body is disinterred, the bones are cleaned, and packed in a roll of pliable bark, the outside of which is painted and ornamented with strings of beads and the like. This, which is called Ngobera, is kept in the camp with the living. If a stranger who has known the deceased comes to the camp, the Ngobera is brought out towards evening, and he and some of the near relations of the dead person sit down by it, and wail and cut themselves for half an hour. Then it is handed to the stranger, who takes it with him and sleeps by the side of it, returning it in the morning to its proper custodian. Women and children who die, Mr. Bridgman says, are usually burnt.

== Alternative names ==
- Yuipera
- Juwibara

=== Today ===
The language and people are usually referred to as Yuwibara in 2020, with a 2020 native title determination made in this name.

== Natural resource management ==
The Traditional Owner Reference Group consisting of representatives of the Yuwibara, Koinmerburra, Barada Barna, Wiri, Ngaro, and those Gia and Juru people whose lands are within Reef Catchments Mackay Whitsunday Isaac region, helps to support natural resource management and look after the cultural heritage sites in the area.

== Some words ==
- barran (black duck)
- goobirry (wood duck)
- kolijo (possum)
- kooroora (native companion)
- kowur, cowurburra (laughing jackass)
- batchary (little)
- beeramo (tomahawk)
- berkum (wild turkey)
- bitty / gooka (bark)
- boongana / binbe (good)
- booroobirry (swan)
- bootarry (cold)
- boree (fire)
- bunga / dullo (wood)
- burngabirry (heat, with sweat)
- coreedulla (eaglehawk)
- curree-birry (light, with sun)
- goolmurry (shield)
- goonda (night)
- goondooloo (emu)
- goongera / bakina (mosquito)
- gootaburra (pelican)
- guea (bad)
- kaigera / wockera (grass)
- kaipa (wind)
- kato (egg)
- kockurra (moon)
- kommo (rain)
- kommo (water)
- koombo (war-spear)
- kurra (no)
- kurree (sun)
- kurreebirry (day)
- mattîna (double pointed digging stick, also used in fighting)
- meegolo (ghost / white man)
- meero (woomera / throwing stick)
- meta (dark)
- moura (wild dog)
- nanny (ground)
- nguchul (crayfish)
- nungina (fly)
- tickeroo (thunder)
- tingeri (white cockatoo)
- toera (walk)
- toolkoon / paree (hill)
- wandee / mirree (tame dog)
- winda (canoe)
- winna (fish)
- wirrigee (star)
- wongala (boomerang)
- woora (kangaroo)
- woorwaya / tulkurry (big)
- wotigana (crow)
- yamba (camp)
- yo / yoi (yes)

== Sources ==
- Battley, Daniel; Kesteven, Sophie (26 March 2015). "Yuwibara language kept alive in Mackay". ABC Tropical North.
- Bridgeman, G. F.; Bucas, H. (1887). "Port Mackay" (PDF). In Curr, Edward Micklethwaite (ed.). The Australian race: its origin, languages, customs, place of landing in Australia and the routes by which it spread itself over the continent. Vol. 3. Melbourne: J. Ferres. pp. 44–51.
- Finch-Hatton, Harold (1886). Advance Australia! An Account of Eight Years' Work, Wandering, and Amusement, in Queensland, New South Wales, and Victoria (PDF). London: W.H. Allen & co.
- Howitt, Alfred William (1904). The native tribes of south-east Australia (PDF). Macmillan.
- Moore, Clive (1990). "Blackgin's Leap: A Windosw into Aboriginal-European Relations in the Pioneer Valley, Queensland in the 1860s" (PDF). Aboriginal History. 14 (1): 61–79. Archived (PDF) from the original on 31 July 2017.
- "Nature, culture and history". Department of National Parks, Sport and Racing, Queensland Government. 20 October 2009.
- Roth, Henry Ling (1908). "Appendix III. Aborigines of Mackay" (PDF). The discovery and settlement of Port Mackay, Queensland, with numerous illustrations, charts and maps, and some notes on the natural history of the district. F. King & sons. pp. 77–81.
- "A Short History of Mackay: The First Residents". Mackay Historical Society and Museum Incorporated. Archived from the original on 16 June 2016.
- Smyth, Robert Brough (1878). The Aborigines of Victoria: with notes relating to the habits of the natives of other parts of Australia and Tasmania (PDF). Vol. 1. Melbourne: J. Ferres, gov't printer.
- Tindale, Norman Barnett (1974). "Juipera (QLD)". Aboriginal Tribes of Australia: Their Terrain, Environmental Controls, Distribution, Limits, and Proper Names. Australian National University Press. Archived from the original on 2 July 2017.
- "Working Together on Country" (PDF). Queensland Government, Australian Government. Archived (PDF) from the original on 20 March 2015.
