= Whitsunday Islands National Park =

National park in Queensland, Australia

- IUCN category II (national park)
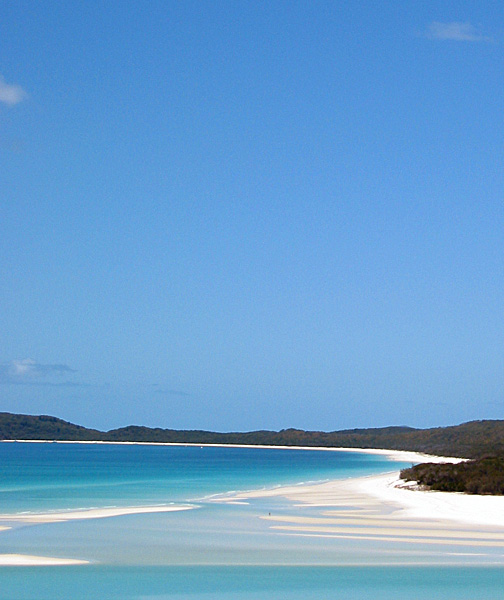
- Whitehaven beach on Whitsunday Island

- Location within Queensland
- Location: Queensland
- Coordinates: 20°3′37″S 148°52′27″E
- Area: 170 km^{2} (66 sq mi)
- Established: 1944
- Governing body: Queensland Parks and Wildlife Service
- Website: Official website

Whitsunday Islands is a national park in Queensland, Australia, 920 kilometres (570 mi) northwest of Brisbane. It contains Whitsunday Island and 31 others, and lies within the greater traditional homelands, sea territory and waters of the Ngaro (and Gia; both Juru) peoples.

== Geography ==
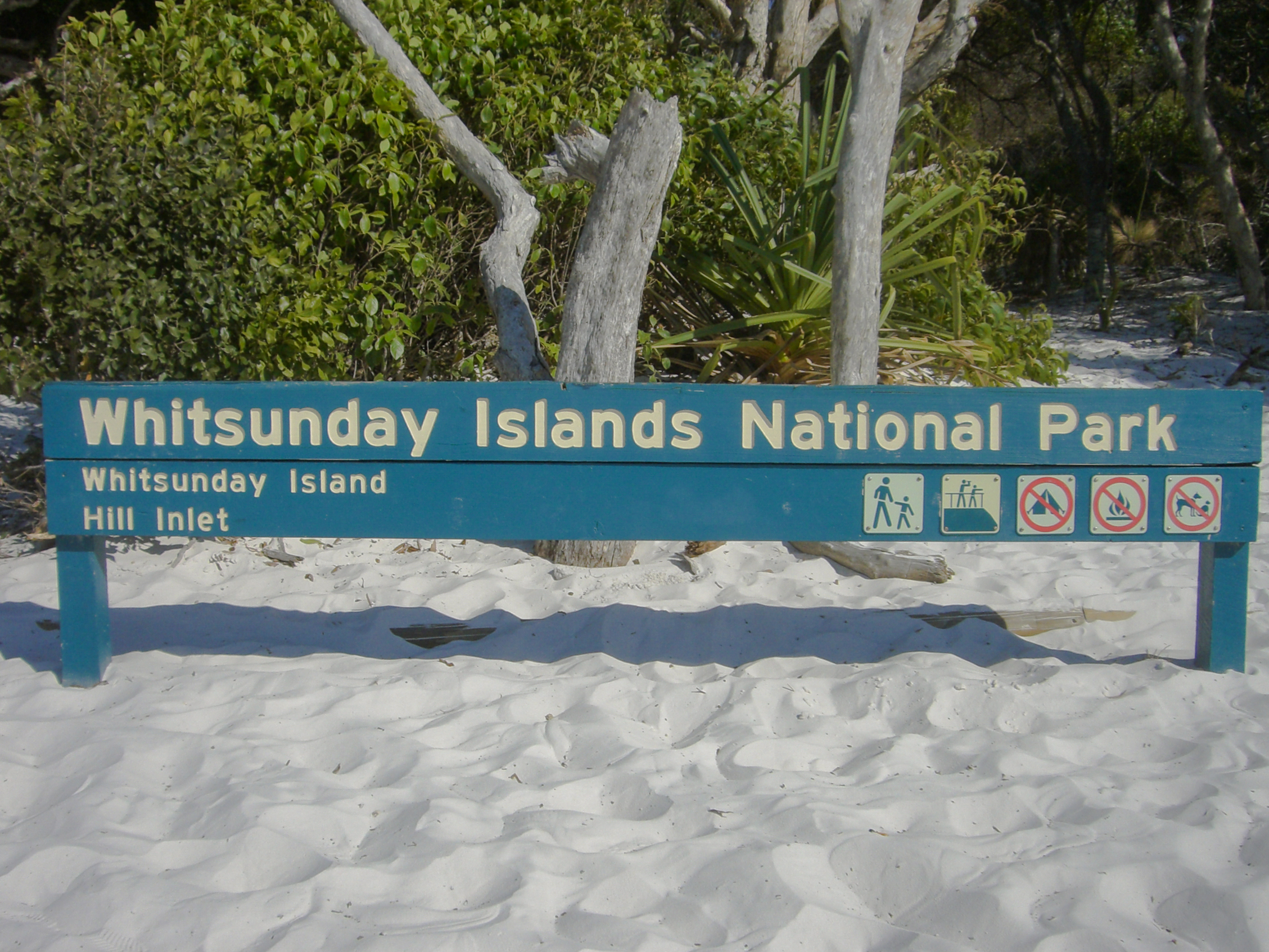
Hill Inlet, 2009

The Whitsunday Islands lie midway along Australia's Queensland coast and are bordered by the Great Barrier Reef and the waters of the Coral Sea. Migrating humpback whales favour the waters around the Whitsunday Islands as a calving ground between May and September each year. Marine stingers are found in the waters of the islands between October and May.

The region spans from the beaches of Bowen in the north and Laguna Whitsundays in the south. All 74 of the islands are surrounded by the Great Barrier Reef and only eight of them are inhabited.

On Whitsunday Island is the six km long Whitehaven Beach. The beach has camping and picnic facilities in its foredunes. A walking track links to Chance Bay.

== Access ==
Access is by private or commercial boat from Airlie Beach or Shute Harbour.

== See also ==
- List of islands of Australia
- Protected areas of Queensland
