= Yetimarala =

Aboriginal Australian people of eastern Queensland

The Yetimarala, also written Jetimarala and Yetimarla and also known as Bayali, Darumbal, Yaamba and other names and variant spellings, were an Aboriginal Australian people of eastern Queensland.

== Country ==
Norman Tindale originally classified the Yetimarala as a clan of either the Barada or Kabalbara tribe (1940), but three decades later, affirmed that it was an independent tribe, after realising that he had overlooked the fact that the American anthropologist D. S. Davidson had already determined its autonomous estate in 1938. Tindale then attributed to them a territorial domain of some 3,900 square kilometres (1,500 mi^{2}), located on the Boomer and Broad Sound ranges, running northwards from the Fitzroy River to within proximity of Killarney. Their western limits were set at the Mackenzie and Isaac rivers.

== Social organisation ==
The name of at least one kin group is known:

- Taruin-bura

== Language ==
The Yetimarala / Yetimarla language, also known as Bayali, Darumbal, Yetimaralla, Jetimarala, Kooinmurburra, Ningebul, Taroombul, Warrabul, Yetimaralla, Ja:mba, Yaamba, Yetti maralla, and Taruin bura, is an extinct dialect of the Biri language.

== Mythology ==
Two anecdotes with the bare outlines of Yetimarala legends have been passed down. One concerns turtle hunting by two young hunters in the Dreamtime.

The brothers, Wulburra and Ngni-ya, camped with their grandmother, for whom they supplied, as they hunted and travelled, ample food. The two decided to try to hunt down a turtle, an arduous feat better performed if they scoured the countryside alone. One brother thought they should still keep their grandmother with them, the other dissented. In the end, they agreed to encase her inside a large stone and after much discussion they decided to put her inside a large stone on Cardowan run, near the Connors River, a site which was to assume sacred status in Yetimarala lore. Wulburra and Ngni-ya then set off to track the turtle, and finally captured one by the coast at Broad Sound. They hauled it back to camp, encircled it with stones and set it to cook on a fire, and, left it to bake while they went off for further game. In their absence, the turtle escaped, and it required several days for them to track it down and recapture again. The scenario repeated itself a third time, only on this final occasion, it proved to be anchored down too firmly to lift, until they levered up its legs. At this point, the turtle kicked out, flipping the brothers over its head, transforming the landscape into a sea, into which they plummeted. Both the brothers and their grandmother died. The grandmother became one of the bright stars of the stream that is the Milky Way, and the two brothers are believed to be figured as fishers wielding forked sticks by that celestial river.

A second example of star lore concerns snakes. In the earliest times, snakes were not eaten. The tribe lived in terror at the existence of two fabulous exemplars, male and female, who succeeded in dodging all attempts to kill them. One day, while the tribe had left the camp to forage, a small boy, Ngnapata, remained, forewarned not to get close to the reptile. His bold curiosity stirred, he fashioned spears and dug out bolt holes in earth in case he needed to hide, determined to try to kill the fearful animals. His efforts paid off, with him slaughtering the male snake after a hectic fight, while the female of the species sought refuge in the firmament, where she was transformed into a star. Ngnapata sliced up the snake, cooked and ate it, finding the flesh very tasty. Taking some of the fat, he oiled his body and suddenly grew into enormous proportions that rendered him unrecognizable. On their return to the camp, the tribesmen were frightened by the child's apparent disappearance, thinking he had been devoured by the serpents. But he allayed their anxieties by recounting his deeds of daring, and the tribe then partook of the remaining portions of the reptile's flesh, establishing thereby the custom of regarding snakes as a food source.

== Alternative names ==
- Ja:mba ("camp")
- Yaamba
- Yetti maralla (mari = "man")
- Taruin-bura ("big river people")

== Gabulbarra? ==
Geoffrey O'Grady also assigned the name Yettimaralla to the Gabulbarra people, whose language is unknown but thought by Gavan Breen to be a dialect of Biri.

== Sources ==
- "AIATSIS map of Indigenous Australia". AIATSIS. 14 May 2024.
- Fox, M. (21 May 1900a). "Legend of the Tha-ra-ra-burra tribe as to How the Sea was Made". Science of Man. 3 (4): 64.
- Fox, M. (22 September 1900b). "How the Tha-ra-ra-burra tribe learnt to eat snakes". Science of Man. 3 (8): 136.
- Howitt, Alfred William (1904). The native tribes of south-east Australia (PDF). Macmillan.
- Tindale, Norman Barnett (1974). "Jetimarala (QLD)". Aboriginal Tribes of Australia: Their Terrain, Environmental Controls, Distribution, Limits, and Proper Names. Australian National University. ISBN 978-0-708-10741-6. Archived from the original on 19 January 2018.
