= Biri dialect =

Extinct dialect of Biri

Biri
- Native to: Australia
- Region: Queensland
- Ethnicity: Birri Gubba
- Extinct: late 20th century
- Revival: exist
- Language family: Pama–Nyungan: Maric; Eastern Maric; Biri

Language codes
- ISO 639-3: bzr
- Glottolog: biri1256
- AIATSIS: E56
- ELP: Biri

Biri, also known as Biria, Birri Gubba, Birigaba, Perembba and other variants, is a dialect of the Australian Aboriginal language of the same name formerly spoken along the Bowen River in the state of Queensland, by the Birri Gubba people.

== Phonology ==
A basic phonetic sketch of Biri is given below. A full phonological analysis cannot be conducted due to the data.

=== Consonants ===
	Bilabial	Alveolar	Dental	Palatal	Velar
Stop	b	d	d̪	ɟ	ɡ
Nasal	m	n	n̪	ɲ	ŋ
Lateral		l			
Rhotic		r ⟨rr⟩ ɻ ⟨r⟩			
Semivowel	w			j	

- /d̪/ is realized as [ð] intervocalically and word-initially before /a/ and /i/.
- /g/ becomes /w/ before and after /u/.
- /n/ and /l/ are realized somewhat retroflex before and after /u/.

=== Vowels ===
Vowels are noted as /a, i, u/. Vowels are raised and fronted before palatals and backed before /w/.

Long /aː/ occurs in only two words, being waːga 'work', an English loan, and gaːgini 'Reg Dodd', a personal name.
