= Baranha people =

Aboriginal Australian people

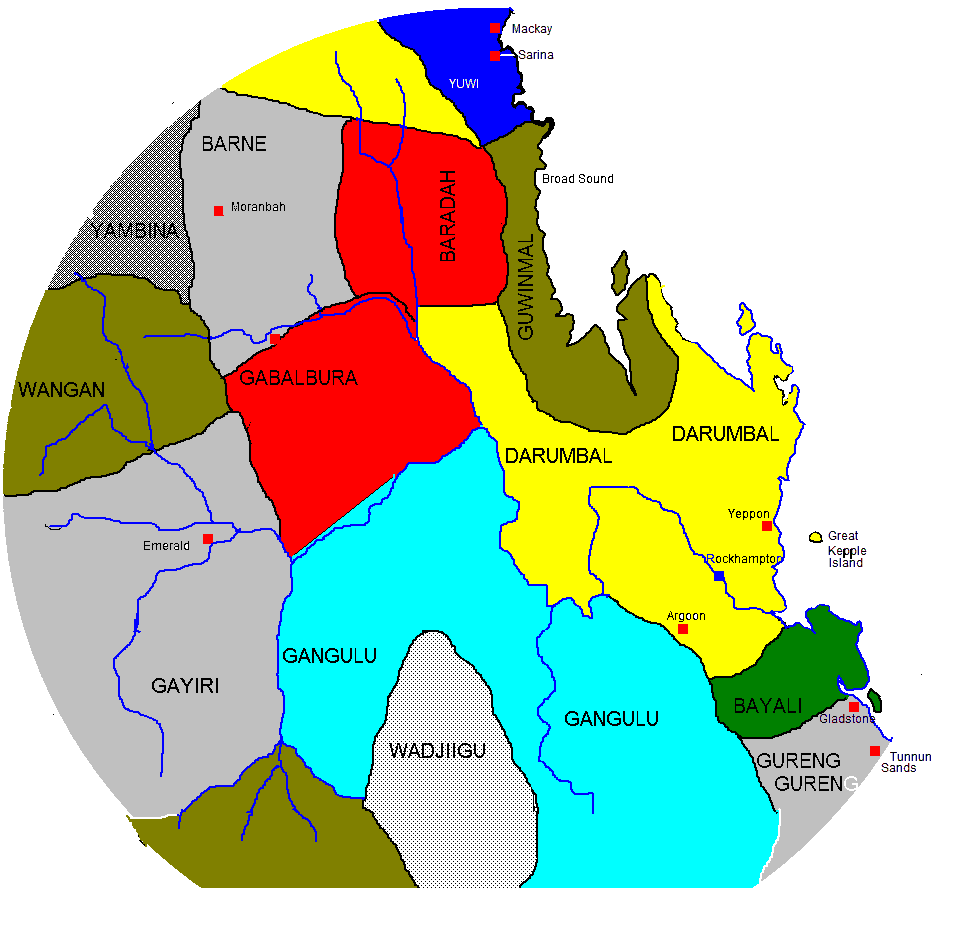
Traditional lands of Australian Aboriginal peoples around Gladstone

The Baranha or Barna, also known as Barada Barna, are an Australian Aboriginal people of northern Queensland.

== Language ==
Their traditional language is believed to be one of the Biri dialects.

== Country ==
Norman Tindale estimated their tribal lands as covering around 3,200 square miles (8,300 km^{2}), centering on the headwaters of the Isaac River, and running west as far as the Denham Range. Their southern frontiers were around Cotherstone. They were also present around Grosvenor Downs. The Wiri lay to their north, and their eastern flank bordered the western boundaries of the Barada.

== Native title ==
In July 2016, Justice John Dowsett of the Federal Court of Australia granted an application for native title determination made on behalf of the Barna people.

The decision covered approximately 2,699 km^{2} (1,042 sq mi), together with another portion of land, 530 km^{2} (200 sq mi), to be shared with Widi people, covering land and waters south-west of Mackay and north-west of Rockhampton in the Bowen Basin.

As part of the determination process, the Barada Barna Aboriginal Corporation was registered on 19 January 2016, and became the Registered Native Title Body Corporate (RTNBC), to hold and manage (as trustee) or manage (as agent) their native title rights and interests.

== Alternative names ==
- Parnabal

== Sources ==
- Bridgeman, George F. (1887). "Port Mackay and its Neighbourhood" (PDF). In Curr, Edward Micklethwaite (ed.). The Australian race: its origin, languages, customs, place of landing in Australia and the routes by which it spread itself over the continent. Vol. 3. Melbourne: J. Ferres. pp. 44–.
- "Budby on behalf of the Barada Barna People v State of Queensland (No 6) [2016] FCA 1267" (PDF). Australian Government. 29 June 2016.
- Lynham, Anthony (29 June 2016). "Barada Barna People and Widi People win native title rights". Queensland Government.
- Tindale, Norman Barnett (1974). "Barna (QLD)". Aboriginal Tribes of Australia: Their Terrain, Environmental Controls, Distribution, Limits, and Proper Names. Australian National University. ISBN 978-0-708-10741-6.
- "Working Together on Country" (PDF). Queensland Government, Australian Government.
- "Barada Barna Aboriginal Corporation RNTBC". Native Title.org. 2016.
