= Chalkie's Beach =

Beach in Queensland, Australia

Coordinates: 20°16′41″S 149°04′34″E

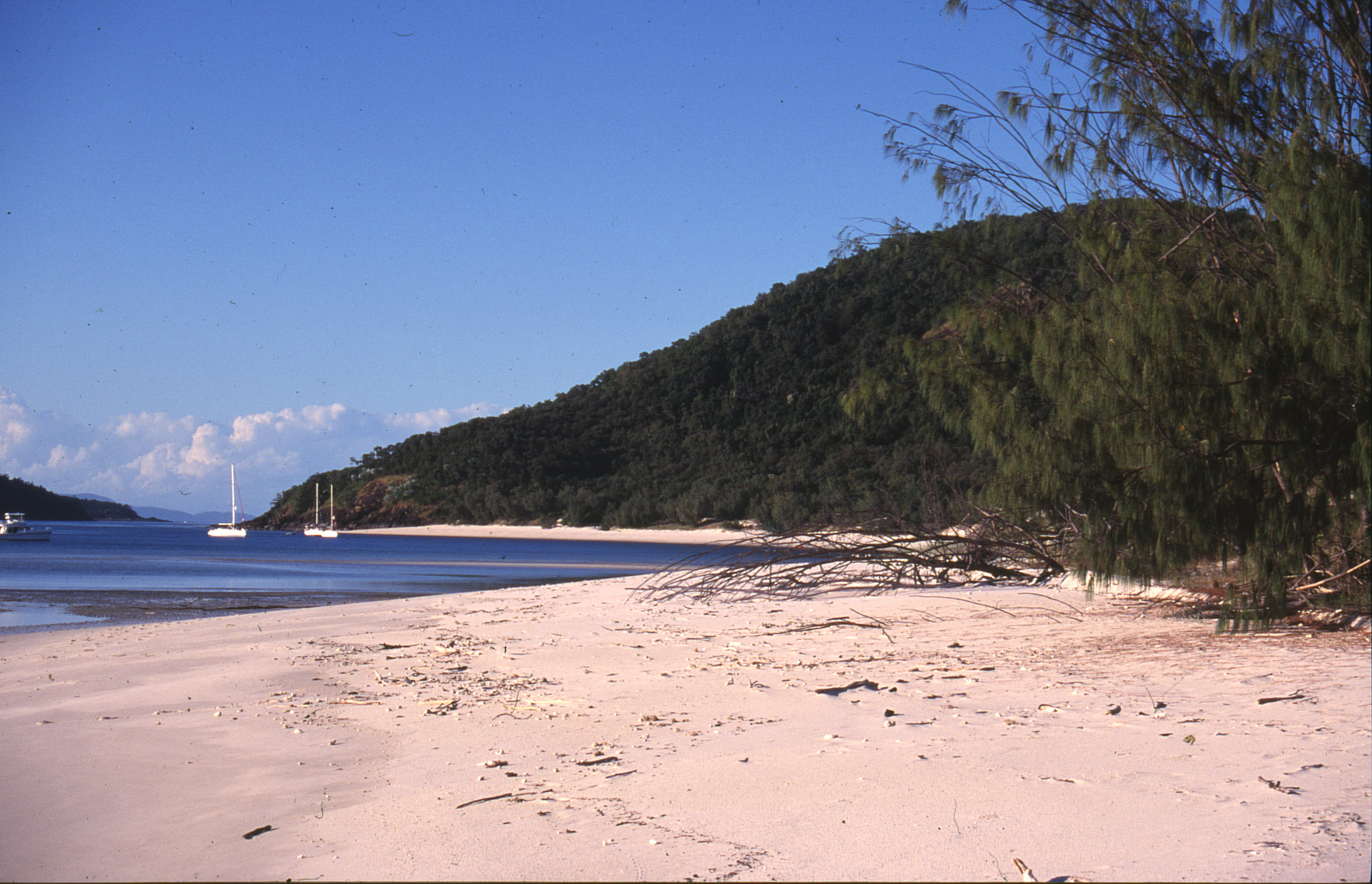
Chalkie's Beach

Chalkie's Beach (also known as Stockyard Beach) is located on the western coast of Haslewood Island in the Whitsunday Islands of Queensland, Australia. It lies across from the more popular Whitehaven Beach on the main Whitsunday Island.

The common name originates from a nickname for local businessman David Hutchen, whose yacht, the Banjo Paterson, frequented the beach as a destination in day cruises. "Chalkie" refers to Hutchen's use of a blackboard for scorekeeping in beer-drinking contests following the Sydney to Hobart Yacht Race. The alternate name, "Stockyard Beach", comes from the presence of stockyards on the island built to house sheep in the 1920s and 1930s.

A fringing coral reef lies offshore, home to a variety of fish and sea turtles—including the green turtle and Hawksbill turtle—which feed on nearby seagrass. The beach is a popular destination for snorkelling.
