= Gia people =

Aboriginal Australian people

The Gia people, also known as Giya, Kia, Bumbarra, and variants, are an Aboriginal Australian people of the state of Queensland. Little is known of them.

== Language ==
The Gia spoke Giya/Bumbarra, a dialect of the Biri language, belongs to the Proserpine subgroup of the Maric languages.

AIATSIS, in its AUSTLANG database, assigns a separate code to Ngaro, but its status is shown as unconfirmed, as the only source for it is a wordlist by Norman Tindale.

== Country ==
According to Tindale, the Gias' lands extended over some 4,100 square kilometres (1,600 sq mi) of land from Bowen to St. Helens and Mount Dalrymple. Inland they reached the Clarke Range. They were present at Proserpine, Gloucester Island, and Repulse Bay.

Tindale registered this as a distinct tribe, directly south of Port Denison, but this has been questioned by Barker.

Although Ngaro is given as a synonym for Gia, and vice versa, it appears that the Ngaro people inhabited the Whitsunday Islands.

The Yuwibara people occupied land to their south.

The Traditional Owner Reference Group consisting of representatives of the Yuwibara, Koinmerburra, Barada Barna, Wiri, Ngaro, and those Gia and Juru people whose lands are within Reef Catchments Mackay Whitsunday Isaac region, helps to support natural resource management and look after the cultural heritage sites in the area.

== Earliest description ==
In response to inquiries made by Edward Micklethwaite Curr, Sergeant B. Shea, a resident of the Gia area, provided a sketch of the natives of his district. He identified them as the Bumbarra tribes. He provided the names of the tribal divisions: those applying to men were Karilla and Whychaka, while women belonged either to the Denterbago or Helmerago. Marriage was contracted when girls reached the age of 12.

== Alternative names ==
- Kia
- Bumbara, (Note: Bumbara is a toponym, and Tindale thought it might refer to a horde of the Gia people) Bumbarra

== Some words ==
- wina (fish)
- pigina (mosquito)
- kroopulla (fly)
- worniwoma (black woman)
- yaboo (father)
- yanga (mother)
- koloona (young man)
- kutha (old man)
- kummi (old woman)
- korea (head)
- dilli (eye)
- wolloo (ear)
- dongalla (excrement)
- nikkana (food)
- kangoola (thirsty)
- wangalla (boomerang)
