= Bucas =

Bucas may refer to:

- Bučas, Lithuanian surname
- Pierre-Marie Bucas (1840-1930), pioneer Roman Catholic priest in Waikato, New Zealand, and Queensland, Australia
- Bucas Grande, island in the province of Surigao del Norte in the Philippines
