= Condoman =

Indigenous Australian superhero

- An original Condoman poster c. 1987
- First appearance: 1987
- Created by: Gracelyn Smallwood
- Based on: Phantom
- Designed by: Ingrid Hoffmann
- Portrayed by: Richard Blackman

In-universe information
- Nationality: Australian

Condoman is an Indigenous Australian superhero created in 1987 as the mascot of a human immunodeficiency virus (HIV) prevention campaign encouraging condom usage among Aboriginal and Torres Strait Islander Australians. Depicted as an Indigenous man in a red, black, and yellow costume inspired by the Australian Aboriginal flag, he initially appeared on posters in North Queensland with the message "Don't be shame, be game – use frenchies!" (using a slang term for condoms, later changed to "Don't be shame, be game – use condoms!" for wider distribution). Condoman was designed to promote safe sex practices as the AIDS crisis began to arrive in Australia, and would come to be recognised as an important symbol in the history of HIV/AIDS in Australia and as a successful case of Indigenous-led healthcare initiatives.

== Background and design ==
When human immunodeficiency virus (HIV), the virus that causes acquired immunodeficiency syndrome (AIDS), first appeared in Australia, Aboriginal and Torres Strait Islander Australians were identified as a particularly vulnerable demographic. Indigenous Australians have disproportionally poor health outcomes when compared to the non-Indigenous Australian population, and healthcare workers feared that HIV had the potential to devastate Indigenous communities.

In 1987, Gracelyn Smallwood, a registered nurse and midwife, became the Aboriginal and Torres Strait Islander representative to the National Advisory Commission on AIDS (NACAIDS) following David Penington's resignation from the position. An Indigenous woman of Birrigubba, Kalkadoon, and South Sea Islander descent, Smallwood was a founder of the Townsville Aboriginal and Islanders Health Service who became interested in HIV prevention after visiting a severely ill HIV-positive friend in the United States in 1985. Smallwood identified that the public health messaging developed by the mostly white Commission so far, including a television commercial depicting the Grim Reaper at a bowling alley bowling down AIDS victims, would not resonate with many Indigenous Australians, especially those in remote communities, due to cultural differences. (Note: While the Grim Reaper is a common symbol of death in the Western canon, it was not necessarily recognisable as such to many Indigenous Australians. Similarly, many Indigenous Australians who lived in regional/remote communities or Christian missions had never been to a bowling alley.) In response to Smallwood's concerns, then-health minister Neal Blewett granted her $5,000 in federal funding to create a HIV/AIDS education program for Indigenous Australians. Smallwood assembled a team of health and social workers who travelled to Indigenous communities across Queensland to hold workshops on HIV prevention and collect feedback, particularly from Aboriginal elders. Condoman was first proposed in one of the workshops, when an elder suggested that "we can have our own Black hero and call him condom man".

The earliest design of Condoman was sketched by Ingrid Hoffmann, a graphic designer hired by the federal government for Smallwood's program. Hoffman traced over an image of comic-book character The Phantom, popular in North Queensland at the time, giving the character dark skin and an outfit in the colours of the Australian Aboriginal flag. The character was intended as a role model for Indigenous men, linking masculinity with safe sex practices and casting Indigenous people as heroes in the fight against HIV rather than victims. Cognizant of the discomfort surrounding discussions of sex and sexually transmitted infections in some communities, the messaging was designed to destigmatise the topic of condom use using simple, positive language. This initial sketch was sent to a design team that included Australian artist Alison Alder for further development and, following approval from the health minister, the first run of posters depicting Condoman appeared in North Queensland later in 1987.

== Campaign ==
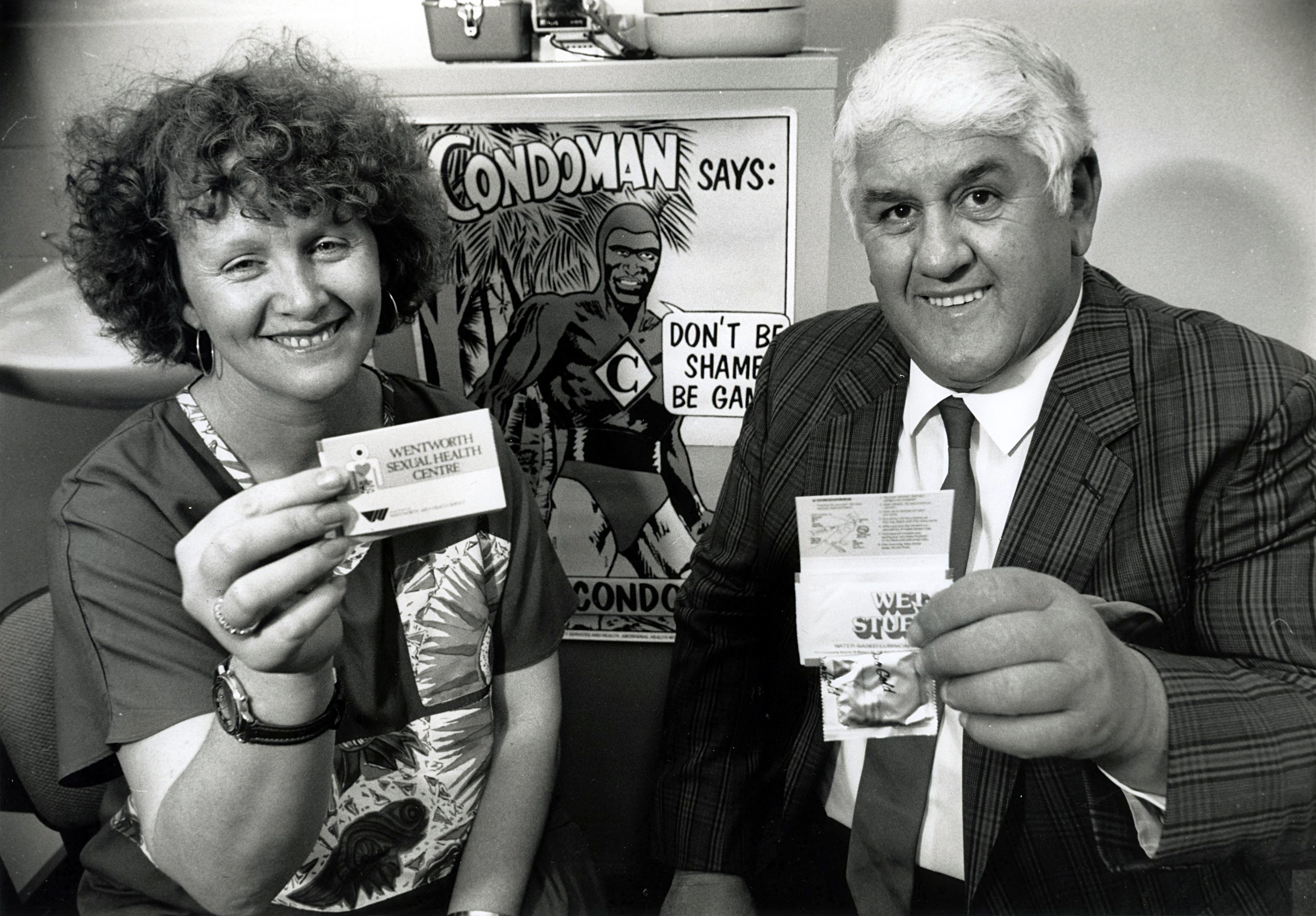
A Condoman poster at the 1991 opening of a sexual health clinic in Wentworth, New South Wales

The original posters depicting Condoman included the text "Don't be shame, be game – use frenchies!", utilising a slang term for condoms that was common in North Queensland at the time. Later versions of the poster distributed in other parts of Australia changed this to "Don't be shame, be game – use condoms!", while versions of the poster used in schools carried the more discreet message of "Protect yourself!". The character proved popular, and Smallwood went on to film an educational advert with schoolteacher and James Cook University football player Richard Blackman playing the character of Condoman in a costume sewn by Smallwood's mother. The advert, filmed at a football carnival, depicts a young Indigenous couple preparing to have sex for the first time when Condoman jumps out of a tree with a box of condoms in hand, telling the teens "Don't be shame, be game! Use frenchies!". Actors playing the character would appear at Indigenous cultural events to distribute condoms and promote safe sex by directly engaging with community members, and in 1991 an actor dressed as Condoman appeared at the Sydney Easter Show to hand out child-friendly material. Further merchandise produced with Condoman's likeness and messaging included t-shirts, stickers, fridge magnets, frisbees, hats, and badges.

The Condoman campaign would be relaunched in 2009 by the 2Spirits program (formerly the Queensland Aboriginal and Torres Strait Islander HIV/AIDS Project) with the goal of providing safe sex education and reducing the associated stigma, particularly for Indigenous gay men, sistergirls, and people living with HIV. The new campaign included a redesign of Condoman and the addition of new characters, including Condoman's female sidekick Lubelicious and a cast of villains representing sexually transmitted infections and relevant stigma. Educational resources, comics, radio messaging, and new costumes for live events were produced as part of the new campaign.

== Reception and legacy ==
The character of Condoman was received well in Indigenous communities upon the campaign's initial launch in 1987. Though originally targeted at North Queensland, it was quickly picked up by healthcare workers across Australia. The campaign has been internationally recognised for its success as both a HIV prevention program and as a community-led healthcare initiative. Though overall health outcomes for Indigenous Australians remain the worst in Australia, HIV infection rates have remained at a low, stable level and there is no significant discrepancy in the mortality or morbidity rates of HIV positive Indigenous Australians when compared to the non-Indigenous Australian population.

Gracelyn Smallwood would be invited to be a keynote speaker at a 1988 World Health Organization conference in London, in recognition of her efforts in HIV prevention and the success of the Condoman campaign, and would go on to tour the United States to speak to African American and Native American communities about sexual health.

Original Condoman posters are now considered collectibles, and a collection of Condoman campaign paraphernalia is exhibited at the Australian Institute of Aboriginal and Torres Strait Islander Studies in Canberra.
