= Bučas =

- Lithuanian surname
- m.: Bučas
- f.: (unmarried): Bučaitė
- f.: (married): Bučienė

Bučas is a Lithuanian surname

- Bernardas Bučas (1903–1979) – Lithuanian painter, sculptor, and graphic artist.
- Jonas Bučas (1900–1973) – Lithuanian economist, rector of Vilnius University.
- Jurgis Bučas (1936–2025) – Lithuanian architect.

== See also ==
- Bucas (disambiguation)
