= Gracelyn Smallwood =

Australian professor of nursing and midwifery

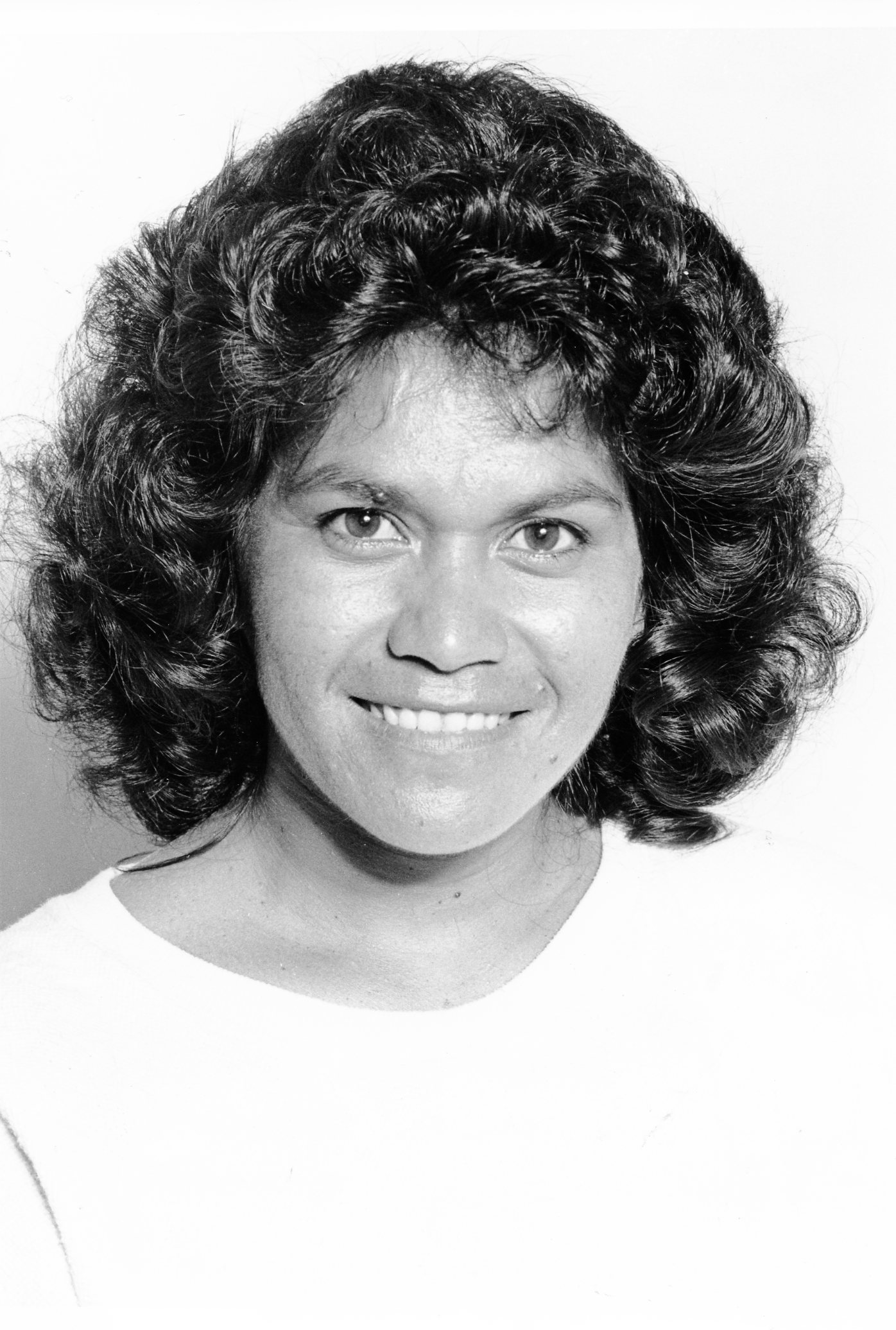
- Gracelyn Smallwood c. 1975
- Born: 1951 (age 74–75); Townsville, Queensland
- Education: James Cook University
- Occupations: Professor; Registered nurse; Midwife
- Notable work: Condoman

Gracelyn Smallwood AM (born 1951) is a professor of nursing and midwifery at Central Queensland University. She is an Aboriginal Australian of Biri descent.

== Biography ==
Smallwood was born in 1951 in Townsville, Queensland. She is of Biri descent. Smallwood trained in general nursing, midwifery and psychiatric nursing at the Townsville Hospital. She was the first Indigenous Australian to be awarded a Masters of Science in public health from James Cook University. Smallwood has been an advocate for the rights of Aboriginal and Torres Strait Islander people since 1968.

In 1987, Smallwood was selected to be on the National Advisory Commission on AIDS (NACAIDS). She was given a grant of A$5000 to create an HIV/AIDS education program aimed at indigenous Australians. She created the successful Condoman character and advertising campaign to promote condom use. She would be invited to be a keynote speaker at a 1988 World Health Organization conference in London, in recognition of her efforts in HIV prevention and the success of the Condoman campaign, and would go on to tour the United States to speak to African American and Native American communities about sexual health.

In 2016, she was appointed Professor of Nursing and Midwifery at Central Queensland University. She retired in 2020. On 15 January 2020, it was announced that Smallwood would be one of the members of the National Co-design Group of the Indigenous Voice to Parliament. She previously served on the Queensland Police Service First Nations advisory group, and resigned in 2023 after an indigenous man was shot and killed by Queensland police.

== Awards and honours ==
Awards and honours received by Smallwood include:

- Queensland Aboriginal of the Year in 1986
- Henry Kempe Memorial Award at the International Society for Prevention of Child Abuse and Neglect in 1994
- Deadly Award for Outstanding Lifetime Achievement in Indigenous Health in 2007
- NAIDOC Person of the Year in 2014
- Member of the Order of Australia in 1992, for her service to Aboriginal Health and Welfare, and to public health, particularly HIV/AIDS.

== Published works ==
- Smallwood, Gracelyn; Royal College of Nursing, Australia (1990), Aboriginal health by the year 2000, Royal College of Nursing, Australia, ISBN 978-0-909449-39-1
- Smallwood, Gracelyn (October 2011), Human rights and first Australians' well-being
- Smallwood, Gracelyn (2015), Indigenist critical realism : human rights and First Australians' well-being, Routledge, ISBN 978-1-138-81036-5
