= Grim Reaper (advertisement) =

1987 commercial to raise awareness of AIDS in Australia

- A screenshot from the commercial depicting the Grim Reaper
- Agency: Grey Advertising
- Client: National Advisory Committee on AIDS (NACAIDS)
- Release date: 5 April 1987
- Produced by: Siimon Reynolds
- Country: Australia
- Budget: $300,000

The Grim Reaper is a 1987 Australian television commercial aimed at raising public awareness on the dangers of AIDS. Created as part of a $3 million education campaign by the National Advisory Committee on AIDS (NACAIDS), the advertisement depicted the Grim Reaper ten-pin bowling in a bowling alley and knocking over men, women, and child "pins" which represented AIDS victims. The commercial was created by Siimon Reynolds and narrated by voice-over artist John Stanton, and was first screened on 5 April 1987. The ad was also supplemented by printed material which explained the disease and detailed preventative measures.

The commercial caused immediate controversy due to its confronting tone and imagery, and the Grim Reaper figure in the ad became unintentionally identified with gay men, provoking fear towards the LGBT community. It aired for only three weeks out of an intended six week run, cut short due to media criticism and public outcry. Nevertheless, the commercial was regarded as highly successful in raising awareness with the Australian public about the issue, with a 327% increase of calls to AIDS related hotlines during the first month of the campaign compared to the 7 months before.

In Australia, the Grim Reaper commercial has remained a memorable example of a confronting but effective government public service campaign decades since its original airing, and continues to inspire subsequent government public service advertising campaigns. It has been recognised as a landmark public health initiative.

== Production ==
The ad was commissioned by health consultant Bill Bowtell, who was a senior advisor to Federal Minister for Health Neal Blewett. Bowtell led the Australian Federal government's response to the AIDS epidemic in the 1980s.

=== Background ===
Siimon Reynolds on the idea of the commercial:

...bowling was in my head. I was bowling every week. And I used to love the animation at Christmas with... for Scrooge, where the Grim Reaper came and visited Scrooge. And I thought, "Well, maybe the Grim Reaper could machine-gun them." Then I thought, no, that'll be a five-second ad and it'll be too short. What's another way he could kill them? He could bowl balls at them. And those two things came together.

Of course, back then, the data was unclear. In some countries—for instance, Italy—almost as many women who had AIDS as men. I think there was also a bit of a political fear that there'll be a backlash against gays if everybody thinks it's some kind of gay plague. But, you know, other countries had failed in their AIDS education because heterosexuals weren't listening. We really had to wake people up. There was a lot of information about how to stop AIDS out there, but no-one was reading it.

=== Filming ===
The commercial cost $300,000 ($750,242 in 2020) to film, and utilised a seven-foot (2.1 m) tall bowling ball on an oversized bowling alley set. The actors were told to fall to the side so the giant ball would not crush them. Reynolds asked John Stanton to sound like Richard Burton when it came to do his voice over.

Details about the ad were kept secret during production, and it was only shown to Minister for Health Neal Blewett for the first time a few days before its television debut, which resulted in a "furious argument" with Bowtell and Blewett's predictions that it would attract intense criticism. Despite its potential to create controversy, Prime Minister Bob Hawke decided not to block the rollout of the campaign.

== Controversy ==
At the time of its release, the commercial caused immediate controversy due to its confronting tone and frightening imagery, which included scenes where children and a woman holding a baby were knocked down by the Grim Reaper, and the claim that AIDS could "kill more Australians than World War II" if left unchecked. Some detractors claimed the ad was scaremongering and created "unnecessary" fear amongst the broader community, and mounting media criticism and public hysteria cut short the campaign's intended six week run to just three weeks.

The ad also received criticism for provoking fear and hostility towards members of Australia's LGBT community and those positive with HIV. The commercial came to unintentionally identify the Grim Reaper figure in the ad with gay men, who at the time were scapegoated as spreaders of the disease and further marginalised because of this association. Australian AIDS pioneer Ron Penny regretted the fact this occurred:

The downside was that the Grim Reaper became identified with gay men rather than as the Reaper. That was what we had unintentionally produced—[the belief] by some that the Reaper was people with HIV infection, rather than the Reaper harvesting the dead.

I think there's never been anything on television or any media that has ever matched it in terms of impact, but no advertising can be without some downside, and that was never intended. But it at least made people aware and probably did change sexual practices of heterosexuals.

The narration also highlighted that "at first, only gays and IV drug users were being killed by AIDS", leaving gay men feeling insignificant and stigmatised.

== Legacy ==
In Australia, the Grim Reaper commercial has remained an infamous and memorable example of a confronting but effective government public service campaign decades since its original airing, and has provided inspiration for a number of subsequent public service campaigns with similarly confronting imagery. It has been recognised as a landmark public health initiative.

In 2017 Australian entrepreneur Dick Smith commissioned a television commercial that invoked the original Grim Reaper ad, including the use of John Stanton as narrator, to launch his "Fair Go" wealth disparity campaign and to raise awareness of his view that the current rate of population growth in Australia is unsustainable. The ad received a mixed reception, with some calling its anti-immigration angle "racist".

During the COVID-19 pandemic, Reynolds suggested using similar emotionally shocking Grim Reaper-style ads to improve government messaging in order to prevent the further spread of the COVID-19 virus and to scare people out of vaccine hesitancy. A 2021 commercial commissioned by the Federal government urging people to book a vaccination appointment which featured a scene of a young woman with COVID-19 struggling to breathe was likened to the Grim Reaper commercial, but was branded insensitive and ineffective by some commentators. Bill Bowtell, who commissioned the original Grim Reaper ad, said it was "misconceived in every way".

== See also ==
- Condoman, a HIV prevention initiative targeting Indigenous Australians
