= Whitehaven Beach =

Beach on Whitsunday Island, Australia

Coordinates: 20°16′43″S 149°02′11″E

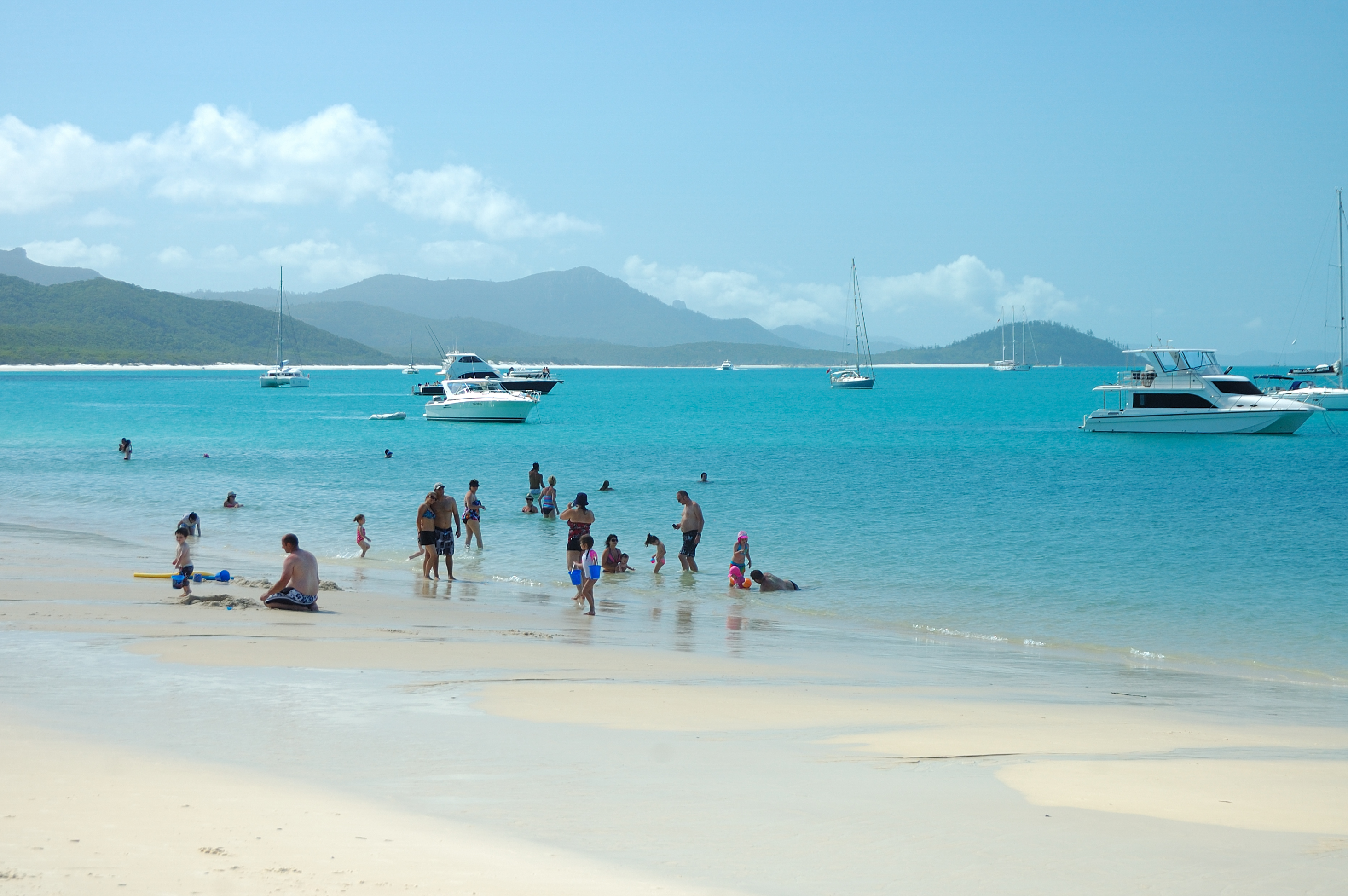
Whitehaven Beach

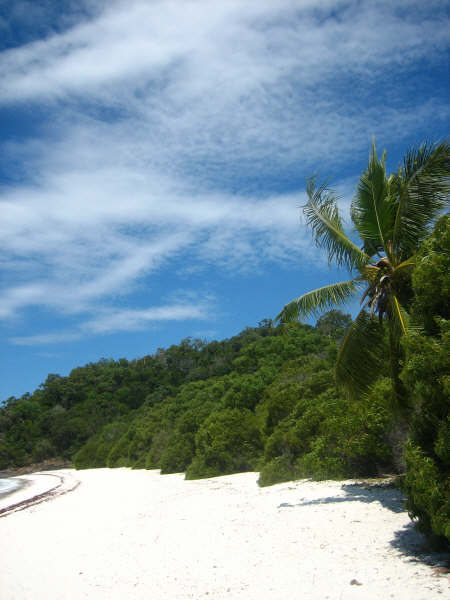
Beach vegetation, 2006

Whitehaven Beach is on Whitsunday Island, Queensland, Australia. The island is accessible by boat, seaplane, or helicopter from Airlie Beach, as well as from Hamilton Island. It lies across from Stockyard Beach, also known as Chalkie's Beach, on Haslewood Island. The beach is seven kilometres in length and is famous for its white silica sands and turquoise water.

== History ==
Although the Ngaro people lived in the area for thousands of years before Europeans arrived, the beach was named in 1879 by British naval officer Staff Commander E.P. Bedwell, who was the Admiralty surveyor for Queensland. The name derives from the English town of the same name, and was one of a number of names from the then English county of Cumberland which Bedwell gave to places in the area. It followed James Cook's 1770 naming of the island group, the Cumberland Islands.

The beach was awarded Queensland's Cleanest Beach in Keep Australia Beautiful's 2008 Beach Challenge State Awards. In July 2010, Whitehaven Beach was named the top Eco Friendly Beach in the world by CNN.com. In 2014, tourism website TripAdvisor placed Whitehaven Beach in its top five on a list of the best beaches worldwide.

In 2017, Cyclone Debbie affected the beach causing severe erosion and damage. Intensive reconstruction work on the southern end was required.

== Geography ==
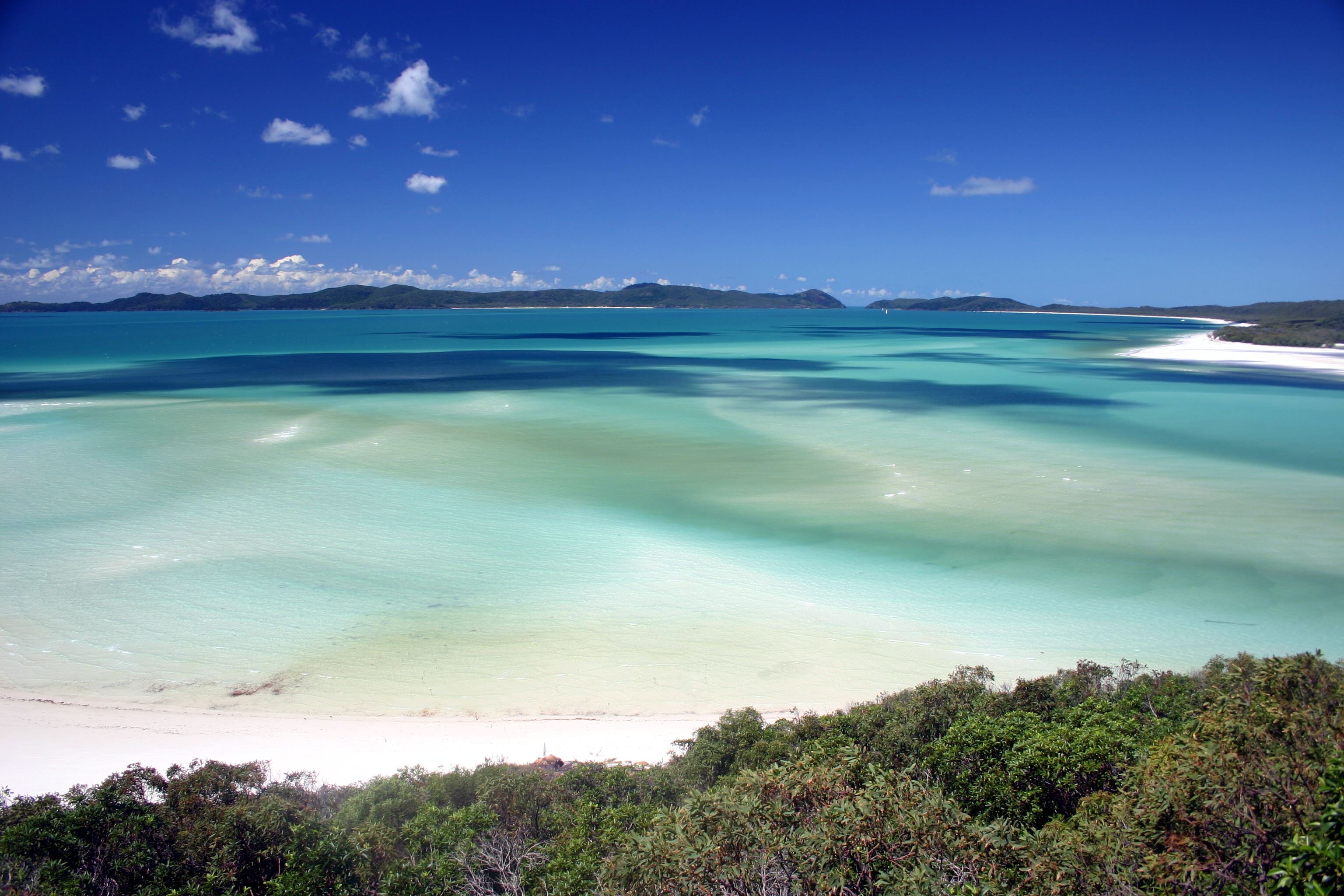
View south of the island

Whitehaven Beach is known for its bright white sand, which consists of 98% pure silica. As silica is not present in local rocks, it is surmised that the sand was brought to the beach by prevailing ocean currents over millions of years.

Unlike regular sand, the sand on Whitehaven Beach retains a lot less of the heat from the direct sun, making it comfortable to walk barefoot on a hot day. This sand is also very fine, and can damage electronic equipment such as telephones and cameras, although it can be used for polishing tarnished jewellery.

== Tourism ==
Tourists and locals visit Whitehaven Beach to swim and take in the bright white sand. Some visitors eat a BBQ lunch, and campers can stay by booking the National Parks camp facilities.

The Whitehaven Beach Ocean Swim is a two-kilometer open swimming competition held on the beach in November each year since 2009 as part of the Hamilton Island Triathlon. The beach was also featured in the racing video game Forza Horizon 3.

In 2018, the government announced an investment of $3.9 million for the construction of a new long-distance walking track and the upgrade of the camping areas on the island. The track will connect Whitehaven Beach to Tongue Point.

== See also ==
- List of beaches in Australia
- Whitsunday Islands
- Lucky Bay, a beach in Western Australia with white-coloured sand
- Hyams Beach, a beach in New South Wales with white sand
