= Gabulbarra =

Aboriginal Australian people

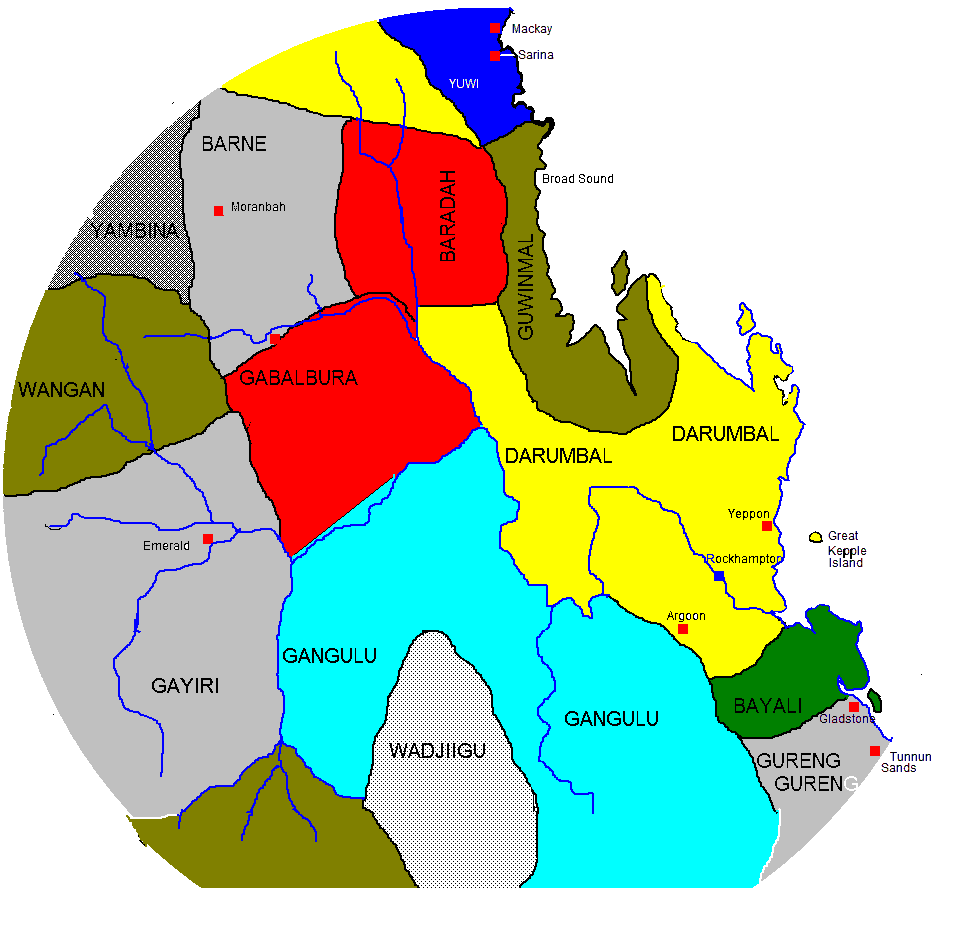
Traditional lands of Australian Aboriginal peoples of central-East Queensland

The Gabulbarra people, also rendered Gabalbura, Gabalbara and Kabalbara, were an Aboriginal Australian people of an area in eastern Central Queensland, but there is little recorded information about them.

== Country ==
Gabulbarra traditional lands were estimated by Norman Tindale to encompass roughly 6,700 square kilometres (2,600 mi^{2}) around the areas to the west of the Mackenzie and Isaac rivers as far as Peak Range. Their northern limits lay close to Cotherstone.

Gavan Breen says that the name alludes to a Central Queensland group who spoke a Biri dialect. The origin of the name is from gabul, the word for "carpet snake", so it means "carpet snake people".

== Alternative spellings ==
Other spellings of the name include Kabelbara, Kaiabara, Gabelbara, and Gabulbara.

Geoffrey O'Grady also assigned the name Yettimaralla.

== Language ==
There has been no linguistic information recorded for this language, but they may have spoken a dialect of the Biri language.

== Gabulbarra Reference Group ==
There is an entity known as the Gabulbarra Reference Group registered in Townsville, which lodged two native title claims over parts of Magnetic Island in 1998, but this group was acting for the Wulgurukaba people of Townsville and the Manbarra people of Palm Island.

== Sources ==
- "AIATSIS map of Indigenous Australia". AIATSIS. 24 June 2022.
- Tindale, Norman Barnett (1974). "Kabalbara (QLD)". Aboriginal Tribes of Australia: Their Terrain, Environmental Controls, Distribution, Limits, and Proper Names. Australian National University Press. ISBN 978-0-708-10741-6.
