= Juru people =

Aboriginal people of Queensland, Australia

The Juru people, also known as Yuru, are a group of Aboriginal people of the state of Queensland, Australia.

== Country ==
In Norman Tindale's estimate, the Yuru had some 3,100 square kilometres (1,200 mi^{2}) of land, extending northwards from Bowen to the Burdekin River at the site of Home Hill. Their southwestern limits ran to the Bogie Range, and south to Mount Pleasant and Mount Abbot. On the coast they were at Upstart Bay. They were neighbours of the Bindal.

== Language ==
The Juru people spoke the Yuru language, now extinct.

== Native title ==
Descendants of the Juru people put in a claim for their native title rights in 2010 who are and only are the following apicals Emily Pickard, Nelle Stell/Steal, Rosie Wake (mother of William and Emma Nicol, and Roger Heron), Lena Taylor, Jinnie Ross, Con Lymburner, Eliza Lampton (Mother of Arthur Lampton) and William Morrell and his wife Bessie Rook. Their rights over 17,600 hectares (43,000 acres) in an area of land between Bowen and Ayr were recognised in 2014, and a Federal Court recognised a further claim in 2015 to another 7,570 hectares (18,700 acres). A conflict emerged over Juru claims for compensation from the owners of some 130 huts located around the mouth of the Elliot River and Curlewis, which as of 2016 had not been settled.

== Natural resource management ==
The Traditional Owner Reference Group consisting of representatives of the Yuwibara, Koinmerburra, Barada Barna, Wiri, Ngaro, and those Juru and Gia people whose lands are within Reef Catchments Mackay Whitsunday Isaac region, helps to support natural resource management and look after the cultural heritage sites in the area.

== Alternative names ==
- Euronbba
- Malmal (toponym for the lower course of the Burdekin River)
- Mal Mai
- Arwur-angkana (?)
- South Murri

== Sources ==
- Gregory, Edmund (1865). Sketch of the residence of James Morrill among the aborigines of Northern Queensland for seventeen years.
- Kelly, Bernice (18 May 2016). "Elliot River hut owners meet for next step in native title saga". Townsville Bulletin.
- "Native title win for Qld indigenous group". SBS News. 22 June 2015.
- Scott, J. Hall (1886). "Burdekin River, various tribes" (PDF). In Curr, Edward Micklethwaite (ed.). The Australian race: its origin, languages, customs, place of landing in Australia and the routes by which it spread itself over the continent. Vol. 2. Melbourne: J. Ferres. pp. 492–501.
- Tindale, Norman Barnett (1974). "Jungkurara (QLD)". Aboriginal Tribes of Australia: Their Terrain, Environmental Controls, Distribution, Limits, and Proper Names. Australian National University Press.
