= Ngaro people =

Aboriginal inhabitants of the Whitsunday Islands

The Ngaro (also known as Ngalangi or Googaburra) are an Australian Aboriginal people whose traditional lands encompass the Whitsunday Islands and adjacent coastal areas of central Queensland, Australia. Archaeological evidence demonstrates continuous Ngaro occupation of the region for at least 9,000 years, with their territory extending from St. Bees Island to Hayman Island—a distance of over 100 kilometers—and to the mainland at Cape Conway and mountains east of Proserpine.

The Ngaro developed a distinctive maritime culture and established hundreds of archaeological sites across the islands, including one of the largest pre-European stone quarries in Australia on South Molle Island, where they sourced stone for making specialized cutting tools.

European colonization from the 1860s brought devastating consequences to Ngaro society. Frontier violence, combined with introduced diseases such as smallpox and measles, caused catastrophic population decline. In 1870, surviving Ngaro people were forcibly relocated to penal colonies as forced laborers. In 1871 a temporary reserve was gazetted to support the remaining Aboriginal population in the region.

Ngaro descendants survive today and maintain connections to their ancestral lands. In 2024, the Gia and Ngaro Peoples registered a native title claim with the National Native Title Tribunal.

== Language ==
There is some doubt about the status of the language, now extinct, of the Ngaro people. It may have been the same as the Wiri language or Giya language (both dialects of Biri), or a separate dialect.

== Country and Traditional Territory ==
According to Norman Tindale, Ngaro territory amounted to some 520 square kilometres (200 mi^{2}), from Whitsunday and Cumberland islands, ranging over Cumberland Islands and including the coastal mainland areas around Cape Conway. Their inland extension reached as far as the mountains to the east of Proserpine. Tindale's mapping was influential but is contested by descendants of several related groups in the area. (Note: For a revision of Tindale's determinations see Barker.) South Molle Island was an important quarry for materials used in stone manufacture, and Nara Inlet on Hook Island affords archaeologists insights into the earliest Ngaro habitation in this area.

The Gia people and language have also been assigned Ngaro as a synonym, and vice versa, but it appears that the Gia lived on the mainland.

As of 2020, the Traditional Owner Reference Group consisting of representatives of the Yuwibara, Koinmerburra, Barada Barna, Wiri, Ngaro, and those Gia and Juru people whose lands are within Reef Catchments Mackay Whitsunday Isaac region, helps to support natural resource management and look after the cultural heritage sites in the area.

== Society and Culture ==
The Ngaro were divided into kin groups; the name of at least one is known:

- Googaburra

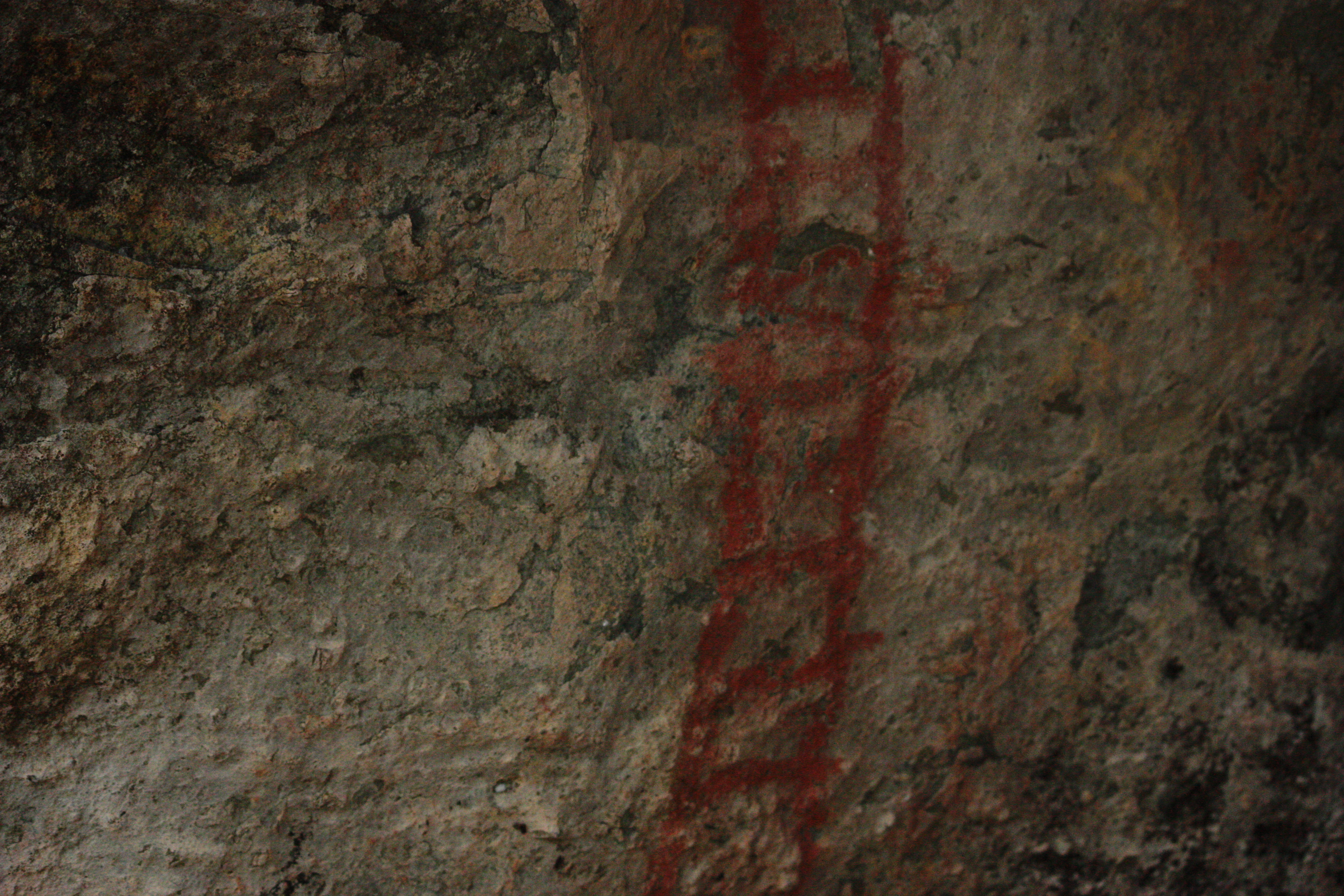
Ngaro ladder cave painting

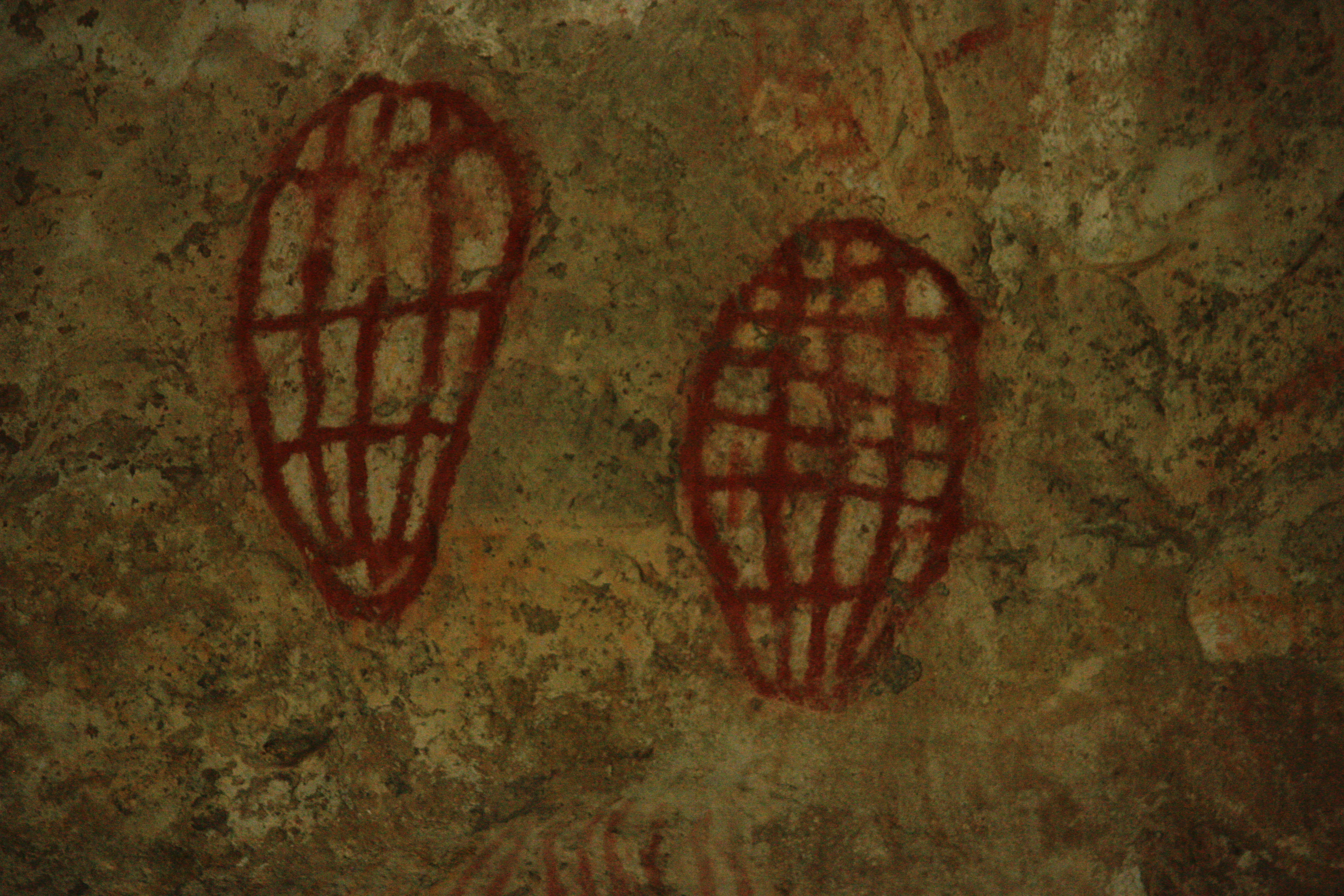
Ngaro turtle cave painting

Whitsunday Island formed the centre of Ngaro life, furnishing the only permanent area of habitation. The Ngaro were noted for their distinctive sewn three-piece canoes, crafted from ironbark and known as winta. Despite assertions, notably by Alfred Cort Haddon, that outrigger technology never reached further down the east Queensland coast that 300 miles north of Whitsunday Islands, (Note: Lourandos suggests that the Ngaro technology had Melanesian origins) the entries in Captain James Cook's Endeavour journals prove that by 1770, the first contact date with Europeans, outriggers were already employed in this area. On these the Ngaro made their journeys and fishing expeditions, sailing not only about the islands in their immediate area but covering an estimated 100 kilometres in and along the reefs, including those between St.Bees and Hayman Island, reefs which they knew intimately. Ngaro oral accounts are consistent throughout the historical record in their description of seasonal visits to the Great Barrier Reef, 43 miles from the mainland and 25 miles from the nearest island, in their canoes.

Their diet consisted of sea turtles, flying foxes, fowls, wild cherries, Burdekin plum, damson berries, trochus shells, baler shells, green ant and cockatoo apples. They also hunted large sea mammals such as small whales from these canoes. This was only possible due to their development of barbed harpoon technology that enabled the Ngaro to kill their prey by exhausting them rather than bleeding them to death, which would attract sharks to compete for the catch.

The Ngaro traded with the mainland, and their artifacts such as baler shells for carrying water, and juan knives fashioned from rock at South Molle, which had one of the largest of such pre-European quarries in Australia, found their way a good distance inland and far up the coast.

=== Rock art ===
The earliest archaeological evidence for habitation in the area has been found at Nara Inlet on Hook Island. Cave openings and nearby mounds, or middens, of oyster-like shells are still visible in the steep slopes of Nara Inlet.

The painting of a hashed oval shape is often presumed to be a sea turtle shell, a prominent food source for the Ngaro and Aboriginal people of the mainland. However, the motifs include geometric designs that have been variously interpreted.

== History of European Contact and Colonisation ==
Various European coastal sightings occurred between the late 1700s and early 1800, with the most substantial contact in 1843 when Captain Blackwood spent time on the Whitsundays assessing their harbour suitability.

European settlement of the Whitsundays began in the 1860s, which brought violence, dispossession, and disease to the Ngaro people. By the 1870s, warfare with traders and colonists, operations by the Australian Native Police, and introduced diseases (most notably smallpox) had devastated Ngaro society. In 1870, the Native Police Corps forcibly relocated surviving Ngaro people to a penal colony on Palm Island or to Brampton Island as forced laborers in timber mills.

Despite colonial efforts to subjugate the Ngaro, indigenous resistance was fierce and they garnered a strong reputation for defending themselves against the colonists. One Whitsundays settler even reported resistance in the area as the most tenacious ever put up by an Aboriginal community.

By the 1930s, the Ngaro population on the Whitsundays had been reduced to a reputed population of around 100 people. Descendants of the Ngaro people survive today and maintain connections to their ancestral lands and waters.

Memories of old songs sung in a mixture of Ngaro and Biri are still recalled by descendants.

== Alternative names ==
- Ngalangi
- Googaburra

== Some words ==
- winta (canoe)

== Sources ==
- "E59:Ngaro". AIATSIS. 26 July 2019.
- Barker, Bryce (1995). The Sea People: Maritime Hunter-gatherers on the Tropical Coast: a Late Holocene Maritime Specialisation in the Whitsunday Islands, Central Queensland. Pandanus Books.
- Barker, Bryce (2006). "Hierarchies of knowledge and the tyranny of text: archaeology, ethnohistory and oral traditions in Australian archaeological interpretation". In David, Bruno; Barker, Bruce; McNiven, Ian J. (eds.). The Social Archaeology of Australian Indigenous Societies. Aboriginal Studies Press. pp. 72–84. ISBN 978-0-855-75499-0.
- Bridgeman, George F.; Bucas, Revd H. (1887). "Port Mackay and its Neighbourhood" (PDF). In Curr, Edward Micklethwaite (ed.). The Australian race: its origin, languages, customs, place of landing in Australia and the routes by which it spread itself over the continent. Vol. 3. Melbourne: J. Ferres. pp. 44–51.
- Dickson, Fiona (25 June 2008). "The Ngaro people of the Whitsundays". ABC Tropical north.
- Dixon, Robert M. W. (2002). Australian Languages: Their Nature and Development. Vol. 1. Cambridge University Press. ISBN 978-0-521-47378-1.
- Hayward, Philip (2001). Tide lines: music, tourism & cultural transition in the Whitsunday Islands (and adjacent coast). Music Archive for the Pacific Press. ISBN 9780646412979.
- Lourandos, Harry (1997). Continent of Hunter-Gatherers: New Perspectives in Australian Prehistory. Cambridge University Press. ISBN 978-0-521-35946-7.
- Moore, Clive (1990). "Blackgin's Leap: A Windosw into Aboriginal-European Relations in the Pioneer Valley, Queensland in the 1860s" (PDF). Aboriginal History. 14 (1): 61–79.
- Smyth, Robert Brough (1878). The Aborigines of Victoria: with notes relating to the habits of the natives of other parts of Australia and Tasmania (PDF). Vol. 1. Melbourne: J. Ferres, gov't printer.
- Stone, Derrick (2016). Walks, Tracks and Trails of Queensland's Tropics. Csiro Publishing. ISBN 978-1-486-30308-3.
- Tindale, Norman Barnett (1974). "Ngaro (QLD)". Aboriginal Tribes of Australia: Their Terrain, Environmental Controls, Distribution, Limits, and Proper Names. Australian National University Press.
- Veron, Edward Norwood (2008). A Reef in Time: The Great Barrier Reef from Beginning to End. Harvard University Press. ISBN 978-0-674-02679-7.
