= Whitsunday Island =

Island in Queensland

Coordinates: 20°15′S 148°58′E

Whitsunday
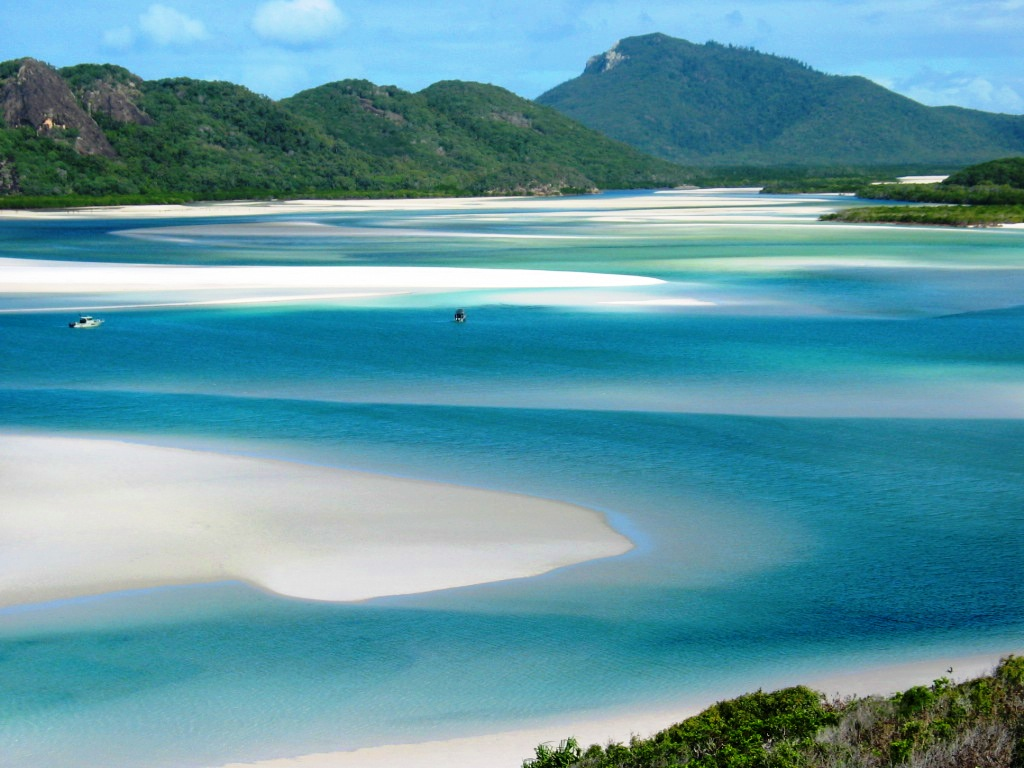
- Hill Inlet, 2003

Geography
- Location: Coral Sea
- Archipelago: Whitsunday Islands
- Total islands: 74
- Area: 275.08 km^{2} (106.21 sq mi)

Administration
- Australia
- State: Queensland
- Local government area: Whitsunday Regional Council

Whitsunday Island is the largest island in the Whitsunday group of islands located off the coast of Central Queensland, Australia.

== History ==
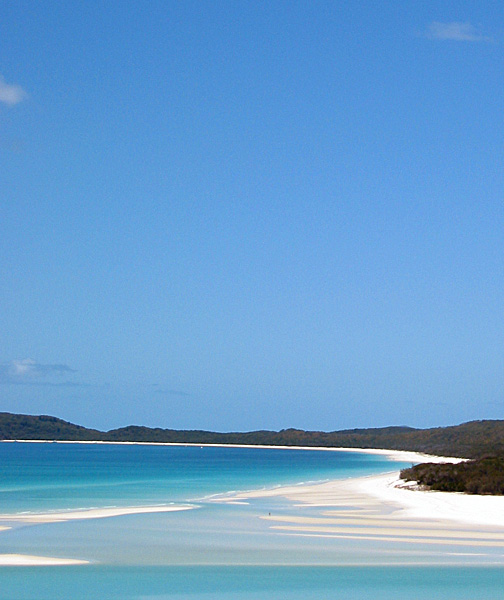
Whitehaven Beach

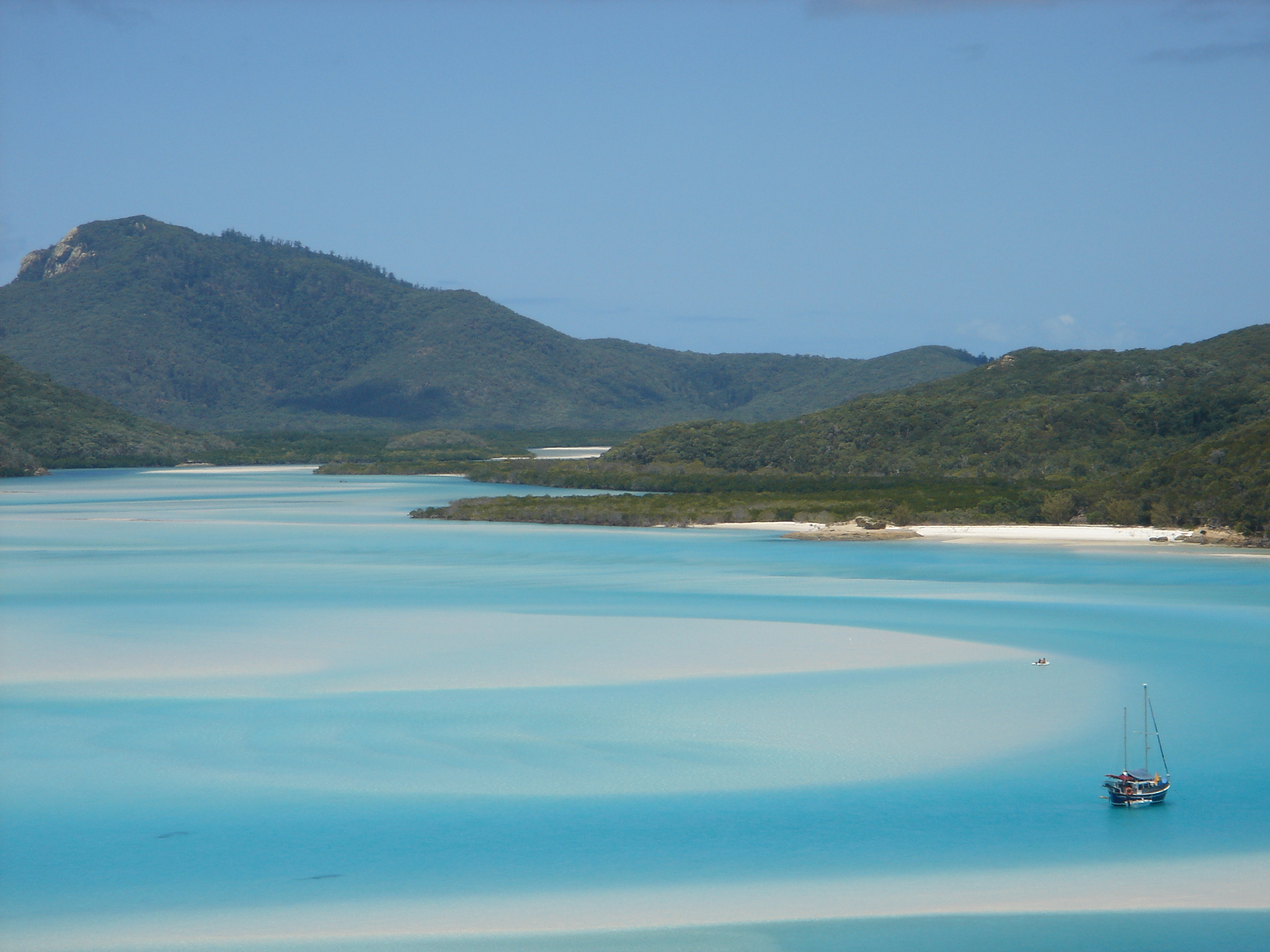
Hill inlet, north of Whitehaven Beach

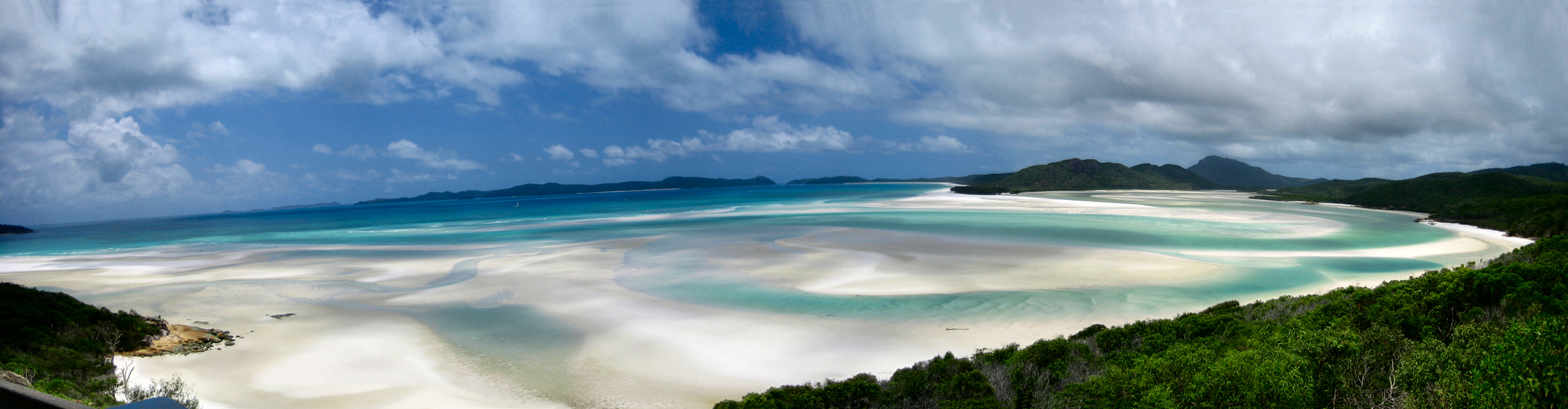
Panoramic view of Whitehaven Beach

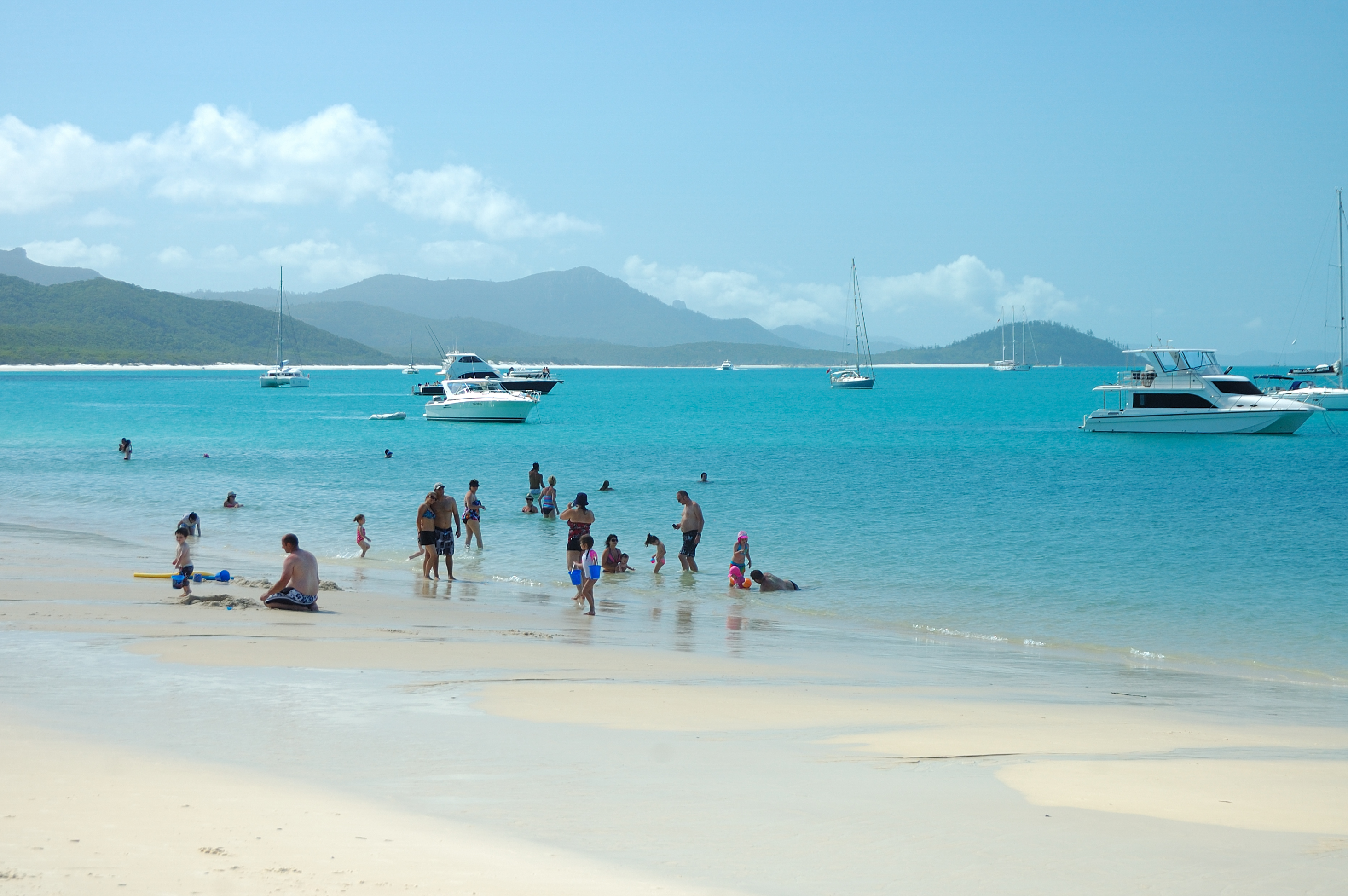
Tourists at Whitehaven Beach at Whitsunday Island.

Whitsunday Island was inhabited by the sea-faring Ngaro people for around 8,000 years prior to British colonisation. Captain Cook named the island while sailing through the area in June 1770.

The first of the logging camps on the island was set up by Eugene Fitzalan in 1861 to exploit the large hoop pine for construction of buildings at the new colonial outpost of Bowen on the mainland. Local Ngaro people laid siege to this camp, preventing work there for two weeks. A Native Police detachment was soon afterwards stationed on the island to protect the loggers.

By the mid-1860s leisure trips to Whitsunday Island from the port of Bowen were being organised by colonists.

In 1878, Captain McIvor of the vessel Louisa Maria was careening his boat on a beach on the western side of the island with some Ngaro people being employed to clean the hull. After these people had heard that some Aboriginal men at Bowen had been killed, they became agitated. They threw the captain into the sea, pelted him with various objects and then speared him in the face. The Ngaro then killed the only other crew-member on board and set fire to the ship, destroying it. Captain McIvor survived and he and the remaining crew were picked up by a nearby vessel and taken to the mainland.

Sub-Inspector George Nowlan of the Native Police, with his Aboriginal troopers and Captain McIvor, subsequently travelled to Whitsunday Island in order "to punish the blacks." Nowlan's party spent a week pursuing the Ngaro across the island, where they "had punishment dealt out to them" and concluded with the expedition "permanently dispersing" the Ngaro. The "policy of dispersal" was associated with the "indiscriminate slaughter of unoffending Aborigines." The Ngaro who survived, fled in canoes to the mainland near Mackay and were further pursued by Inspector Morisset and Sgt Graham and their troopers. A few months later, Captain McIvor was hacked to death by his Chinese cook.

== Geography ==
The island is accessible by boat from the mainland tourist ports of Airlie Beach and Shute Harbour. It contains many popular destinations for both day visitors and overnight sailors, including the magnificent pure-white sands of Whitehaven Beach and Hill Inlet, the secure anchorage of Cid Harbour, and the sheltered waterway of Gulnare Inlet. The island also has six campgrounds.

The island covers 27,508 ha (275.08 km^{2}) in area. Around the northern bays of the island are seagrass beds which support a diverse range of marine life. Unadorned rock-wallabies are found on the island.

The seas here are warm, clear, shallow, nutrient rich and fast moving due to large tidal flows making them well-suited to the growth of fringing coral reefs. Whitehaven Beach on the east coast of the island was rated internationally as the top Eco Friendly Beach in 2010.

The island should not be confused with Pinaki in the Tuamotu group which was named "Whitsunday Island" by Samuel Wallis in 1767.

== See also ==
- Whitsunday
- List of islands of Australia
- Whitsunday Islands National Park
