= Wiri people =

Aboriginal Australian people of Queensland

The Wiri (also known as the Widi or Wierdi) are an Aboriginal Australian people of an area on the eastern side of the state of Queensland. They speak a dialect of the Biri language called Wiri (also known as Widi).

== Country ==
The Wiri's tribal lands spread over some 5,200 square kilometres (2,000 sq mi) from the Coast Range east of the coastal area around Mackay and running inland as far as Nebo and the headwaters of the Bowen and Suttor rivers. They took in both the Connor and Denham ranges. Wiri territory is basically rainscrub, with drier country on its western flank.

Since 2019, the Wiri hold native title of lands west of Mackey.

A traditional owner reference group consisting of representatives of the Yuwibara, Koinmerburra, Barada Barna, Wiri, Ngaro, and those Gia and Juru people whose lands are within Reef Catchments Mackay Whitsunday Isaac region, helps to support natural resource management and look after the cultural heritage sites in the area.

== Language ==
Wiri is a dialect of the Biri language, also spelt Wirri, Widi, Widi, Wierdi, Wirdi, Witi, and also known as Gongolo.

== Sources ==
- Dixon, Robert M. W. (2002). Australian Languages: Their Nature and Development. Vol. 1. Cambridge University Press. ISBN 978-0-521-47378-1.
- Tindale, Norman Barnett (1974). "Wiri (QLD)". Aboriginal Tribes of Australia: Their Terrain, Environmental Controls, Distribution, Limits, and Proper Names. Australian National University Press.
