= Repulse Island National Park =

National park in Australia

- IUCN category II (national park)
- Location within Queensland
- Location: Queensland
- Coordinates: 20°36′00″S 148°52′34″E
- Area: 1.51 km^{2} (0.58 sq mi)
- Established: 1994
- Governing body: Queensland Parks and Wildlife Service

Repulse Island is a national park in North Queensland, Australia, 875 km northwest of Brisbane.

== See also ==
- Protected areas of Queensland
