= Cape Palmerston National Park =

National park in Australia

- IUCN category II (national park)
- Location within Queensland
- Location: Queensland
- Nearest city: Koumala
- Coordinates: 21°35′25″S 149°25′39″E
- Area: 71.9 km^{2} (27.8 sq mi)
- Established: 1976
- Governing body: Queensland Parks and Wildlife Service
- Website: http://www.nprsr.qld.gov.au/parks/cape-palmerston/

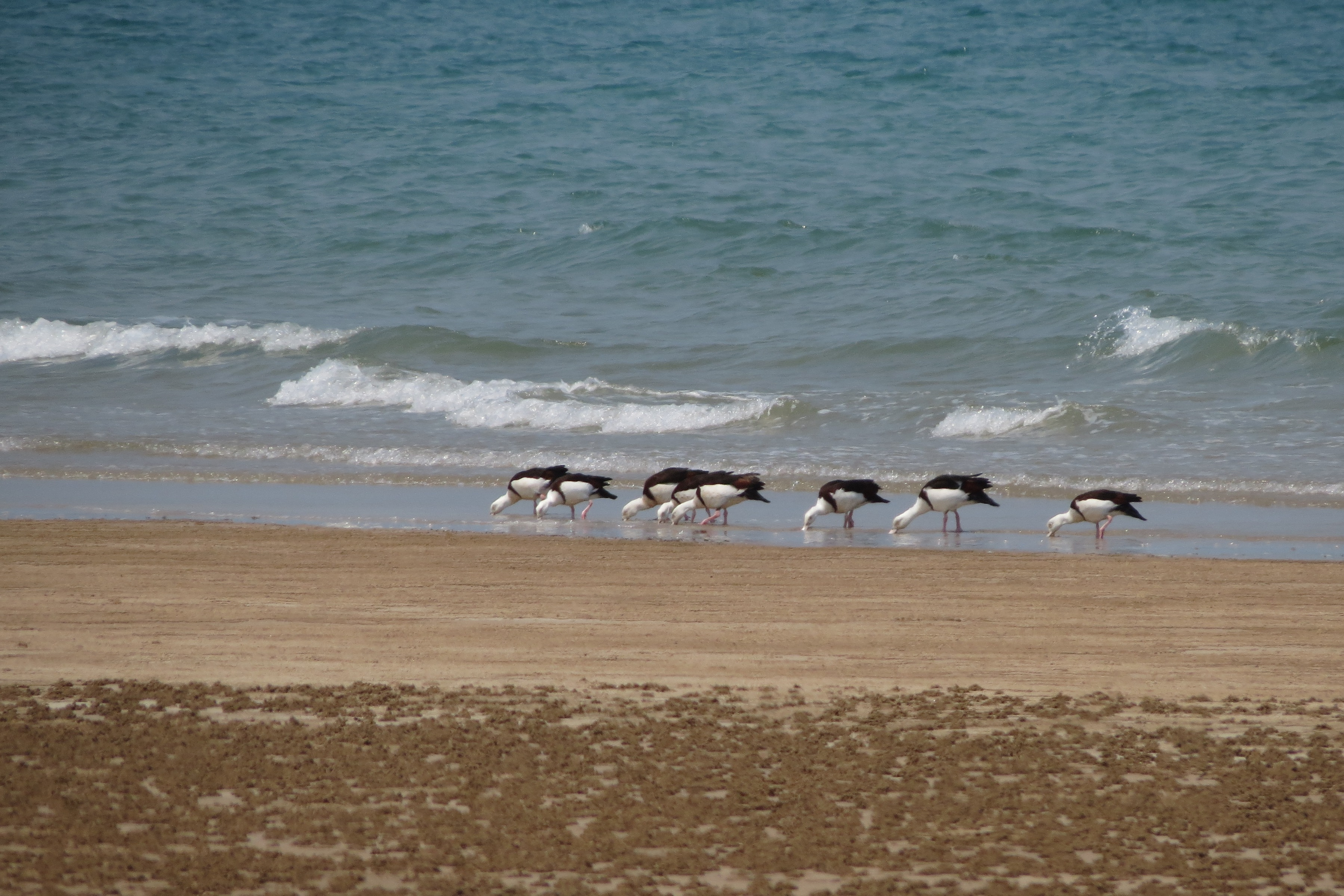
Radjah shelduck Tadorna radjah on the beach at Cape Palmerston National Park

Cape Palmerston is a national park in the Mackay Region, Queensland, Australia.

== Geography ==
The park is 748 km northwest of Brisbane. It is located within the boundaries of Koumala, part of the Mackay Region local government area. It lies within the water catchment area of Plane Creek and the Central Mackay Coast bioregion.

It contains a land area of 7,160 ha and has 28 km of coastline on each side of the Cape Palmerston—named by Captain James Cook in 1770 after Viscount Palmerston, a Lord Commissioner of the Admiralty. Within the park is the 344 m Mount Funnel.

External videos
- Aerial view of Cape Creek Camping Ground

The park contains mangrove trees, dunes, woodlands, grass, and wetlands. It is home to the threatened water mouse species, and hosts numerous birds. Three other rare or threatened species have been identified in the park. Birdwatching enthusiasts can enjoy the view of ospreys and sea eagles hovering over their heads, and white-breasted woodswallows in flowering grasstrees.

Access is by four-wheel drive vehicle. There are three camping areas. Permits are required and can be collected at a self-registration station.

== See also ==
- Protected areas of Queensland
