= Barada people =

Aboriginal Australian people

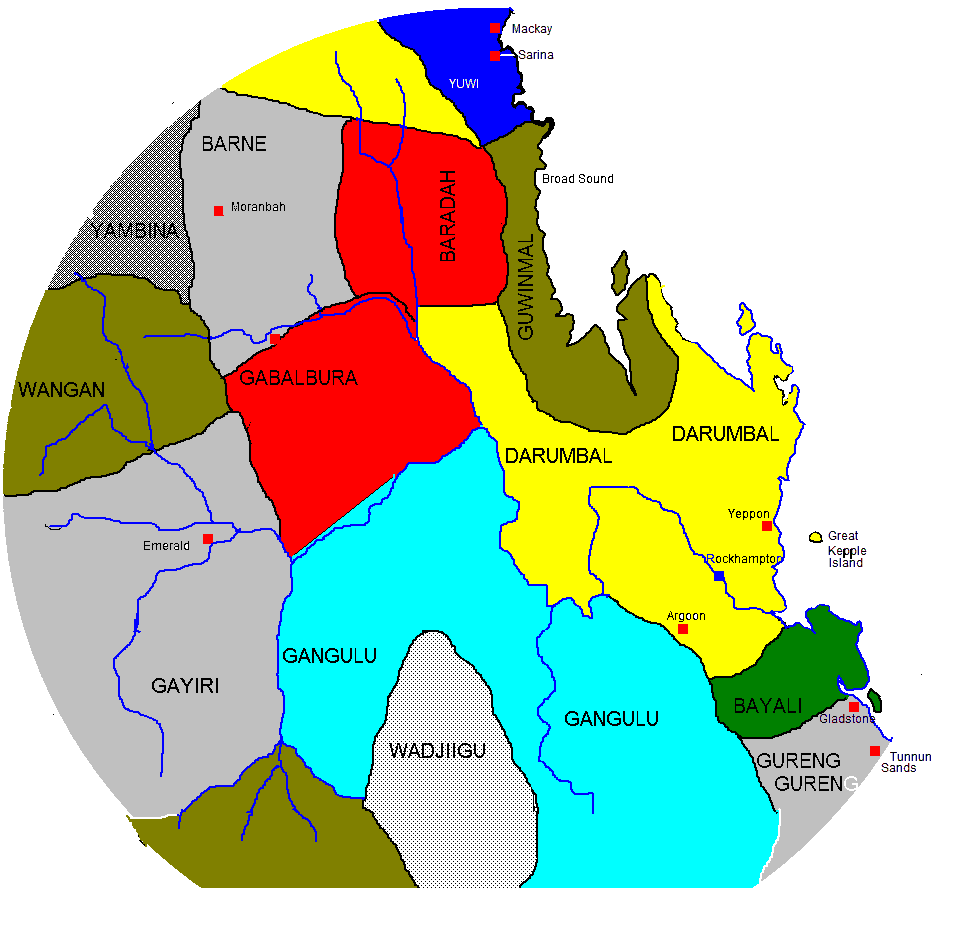
Aboriginal peoples of central-eastern Queensland

The Barada people are an Aboriginal Australian people of Central Queensland not far inland from the east coast. Tindale gives Thar-ar-ra-burra and Toolginburra as alternative names.

== Country ==
Barada lands, according to Norman Tindale's estimation, stretched over some 6,500 square kilometres (2,500 mi^{2}), in the area of the Connors River from Killarney north to Nebo. Their westward extension stops around Bombandy. Barada country lies between the coastal Koinjmal and the Barna to their west. Their northern borders meet with those of the Wiri.

Barada people hold Native Title through two groups – the southern Barada Kabalbara and Yetimarala people, and the northern Barada Barna people.

== Social organisation ==
Barada people, like others of the Mackay area, have two main social divisions, or phratries, namely the Yangurru and Wudhurru. These classificatory terms are applied not only to the constituent groups, but to all natural phenomena, which are ascribed to either one or the other of the two basic classes. (Note: "When an Australian of the Port Mackay tribe says that the sun, snakes, etc., are of the Yungaroo phratry, he does not mean merely to apply a common, but none the less a purely conventional, nomenclature to these different things; the word has an objective signification for him. He believes that alligators really are Yungaroo and that kangaroos are Wootaroo. The sun is Yungaroo, the moon Wootaroo, and so on for the constellations, trees, plants, etc.")

- Yangurru are subdivided further into Gurrgila and Gurrgilan (male and female) and Banbai and Banbaiyan.
- The Wudhurru are subdivided into Guburu and Guburuan, masculine and feminine, and Wun.gu and Wun.guan.

At least two distinct sub-branches or kin groups are said to have formed part of the Barada.

- Thararburra (Thar-ar-ra-burra), centered around Cardowan
- Toolginburra, a name related to their word for "hill", namely tulkun

== Language ==
The language spoken by the Barada people was the Barada language, a Maric language of the Pama-Nyungan language family. The language was silenced during the 19th and 20th centuries through the 1897 Aboriginals Protection and Restriction of the Sale of Opium Act.

== History of contact ==
While sailing up Queensland’s east coast, Lieutenant James Cook sighted a group of mountains on the coastal plain of today’s Sunshine Coast, and named them the Glass House Mountains after the glass furnaces in Yorkshire. Aboriginal people had long used this area as a meeting place for ceremonies, trading, and gatherings. Cook first landed in Queensland at Round Hill (now known as Seventeen Seventy) on 24 May 1770.

The area around Mackay began to be colonised in 1860, and, according to George Bridgeman,

During the eight or ten years which followed, about one-half of the aboriginal population was either shot down by the Native Mounted Police and their officers, or perished from introduced loathsome diseases before unknown.

Bridgeman named the Barada (Toolginburra) as one of the four Mackay tribes that suffered from this decimation, part of the Australian frontier wars occurring throughout the colonies. Though the "dispersal" shootings are thought to have accounted for the majority of deaths, a measles epidemic struck the survivors in 1876, drastically reducing their numbers, and, according to one estimation, the remnants of the original people in 1880 amounted to no more than 100 people, with 80 evenly divided between men and women, and the remainder their children.

== Alternative names ==
- Thar-ar-ra-burra/Tha-ra-ra-burra (horde at Cardowan)
- Toolginburra

== Natural resource management ==
The Traditional Owner Reference Group consisting of representatives of the Yuwibara, Koinmerburra, Barada Barna, Wiri, Ngaro, and those Gia and Juru people whose lands are within Reef Catchments Mackay Whitsunday Isaac region, helps to support natural resource management and look after the cultural heritage sites in the area.

== Sources ==
- Bridgeman, George F. (1887). "Port Mackay and its Neighbourhood" (PDF). In Curr, Edward Micklethwaite (ed.). The Australian race: its origin, languages, customs, place of landing in Australia and the routes by which it spread itself over the continent. Vol. 3. Melbourne: J. Ferres. pp. 44–51.
- Durkheim, Émile (2012) [First published 1915]. The Elementary Forms of the Religious Life. Translated by Swain, Joseph Ward. Dover Publications. ISBN 978-0-486-45456-6.
- Robertson, William (1928). Basedow, Herbert (ed.). Coo-ee talks: a collection of lecturettes upon early experiences among the Aborigines of Australia delivered from a wireless broadcasting station. Sydney: Angus & Robertson.
- Smyth, Robert Brough (1878). The Aborigines of Victoria: with notes relating to the habits of the natives of other parts of Australia and Tasmania (PDF). Vol. 1. Melbourne: J. Ferres, gov't printer.
- Tindale, Norman Barnett (1974). "Barada (QLD)". Aboriginal Tribes of Australia: Their Terrain, Environmental Controls, Distribution, Limits, and Proper Names. Australian National University. ISBN 978-0-708-10741-6. Archived from the original on 12 October 2017.
- "Working Together on Country" (PDF). Queensland Government, Australian Government.
