= Biri language =

Extinct Australian Aboriginal language

Biri
- Native to: Australia
- Region: Queensland
- Ethnicity: Birri Gubba
- Revival: 21st century
- Language family: Pama–Nyungan: Maric; Biri

Language codes
- ISO 639-3: bzr
- Glottolog: east2716
- AIATSIS: E56 Biri

Biri is a language traditionally spoken in an area between Mackay and Townsville of Queensland by the Birri Gubba people. Several grammatical descriptions of Biri were written before the language was silenced, (Note: For an overview of the sociopolitical history of First Nations languages, see the Report of the Third National Indigenous Languages Survey (NILS3).) but has been undergoing revival by the community for some years.

At least eight distinct languages have been historically regarded as dialects of Biri. Recent research is finding that at least some of these varieties, such as Gangulu, Barada, Wirri and Garaynbal, have significant lexical, morphological and phonological differences to Biri, and as such should be considered distinct languages.

== Related language varieties ==
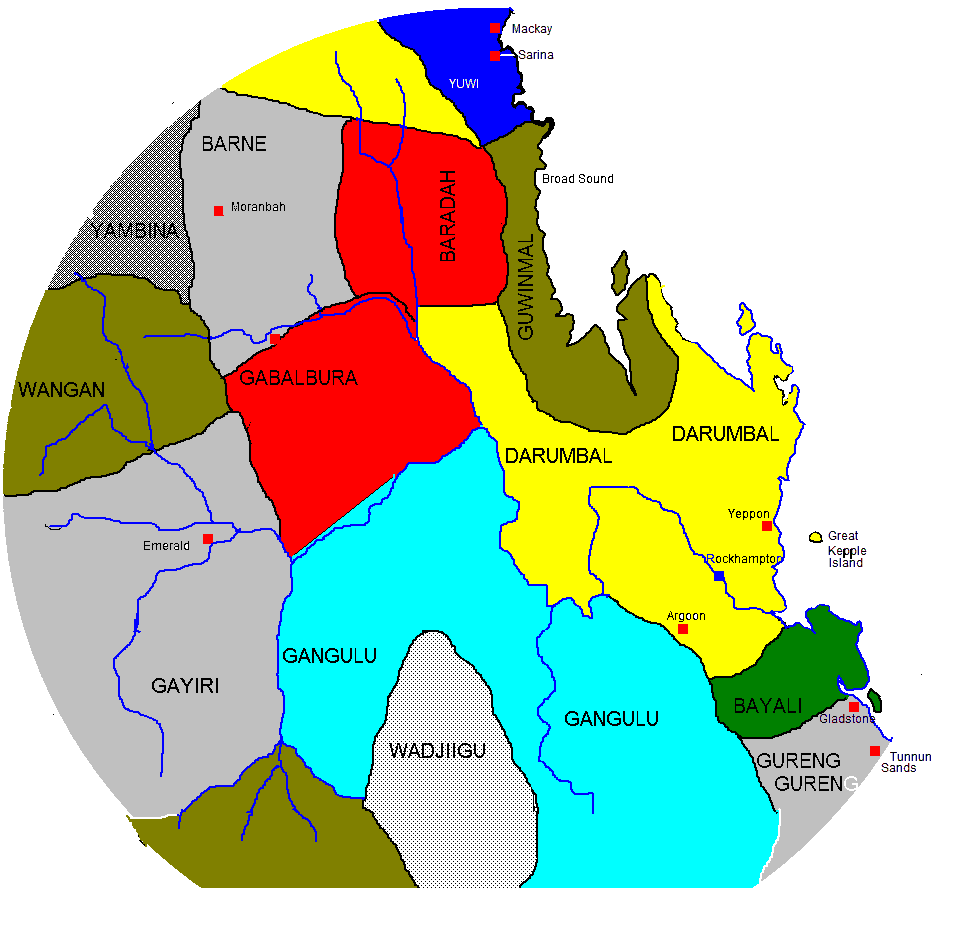
Traditional lands of Aboriginal people around Mackay, Rockhampton and Gladstone in Queensland

The following languages are regarded as closely related languages of Biri by the AUSTLANG database maintained by AIATSIS. Only one alternative name is given, for brevity; most have many more. Most, if not all, of these languages were silenced during the 19th and 20th centuries, but many of them are now being reawakened by their respective communities.

- E38: Garaynbal (Garingbal)
- E40: Gangulu (Kaangooloo)
- E48: Barada (Thar-ar-ra-burra)
- E51: Yambina (Jampal)
- E52: Yangga (Jangga)
- E54: Yuwi (Juipera)
- E55: Yilba (Yukkaburra)
- E57: Wiri (Widi)
- E58: Giya (Bumbarra)
- E59: Ngaro (Giya)
- E63: Yetimarala / Yetimarla

=== Yuwi ===
E54: Yuwi (Juipera, Toolginburra, Yuipera, Juwibara, Yuibera, Yuwiburra, Yuwibarra, Yuwibara): Yuwibara is treated as a dialect of Biri by Angela Terrill, based on George Bridgeman and Pierre-Marie Bucas' list in Curr (Vol.3, pp. 44–51), having over 80% in common with Biri. However Gavan Breen assigns it to Wiri (E57) – another dialect of Biri – on the basis of geography and other evidence. AIATSIS had not as of October 2020 assigned a status to it.

Yuwi had no recorded speakers between 1975 and 2016 according to AUSTLANG, but efforts are being made to revive the language. After a group of Yuwi descendants had worked hard to revive the language, by January 2020 elders were able to conduct "Welcome to Country" ceremonies in language. It was a long process, which included Elders consulting with the State Library of Queensland, working on building word lists and developing a dictionary. The organisation First Languages Australia, a language advocacy body established in 2013, lends support.

The language and people are usually referred to as Yuwibara today, with a 2020 native title determination made in this name.

=== Ngaro ===
E59: Ngaro's status as a separate dialect is unconfirmed, with a Tindale wordlist being the only source. Breen assigns it to Wiri (E57).

=== Gabulbarra ===
Gabulbarra is name for a people of Central Queensland, but little is known about their language. The Gabulbarra people are closely connected with the Barada people and may have spoken a similar language to Barada.
