= Pierre-Marie Bucas =

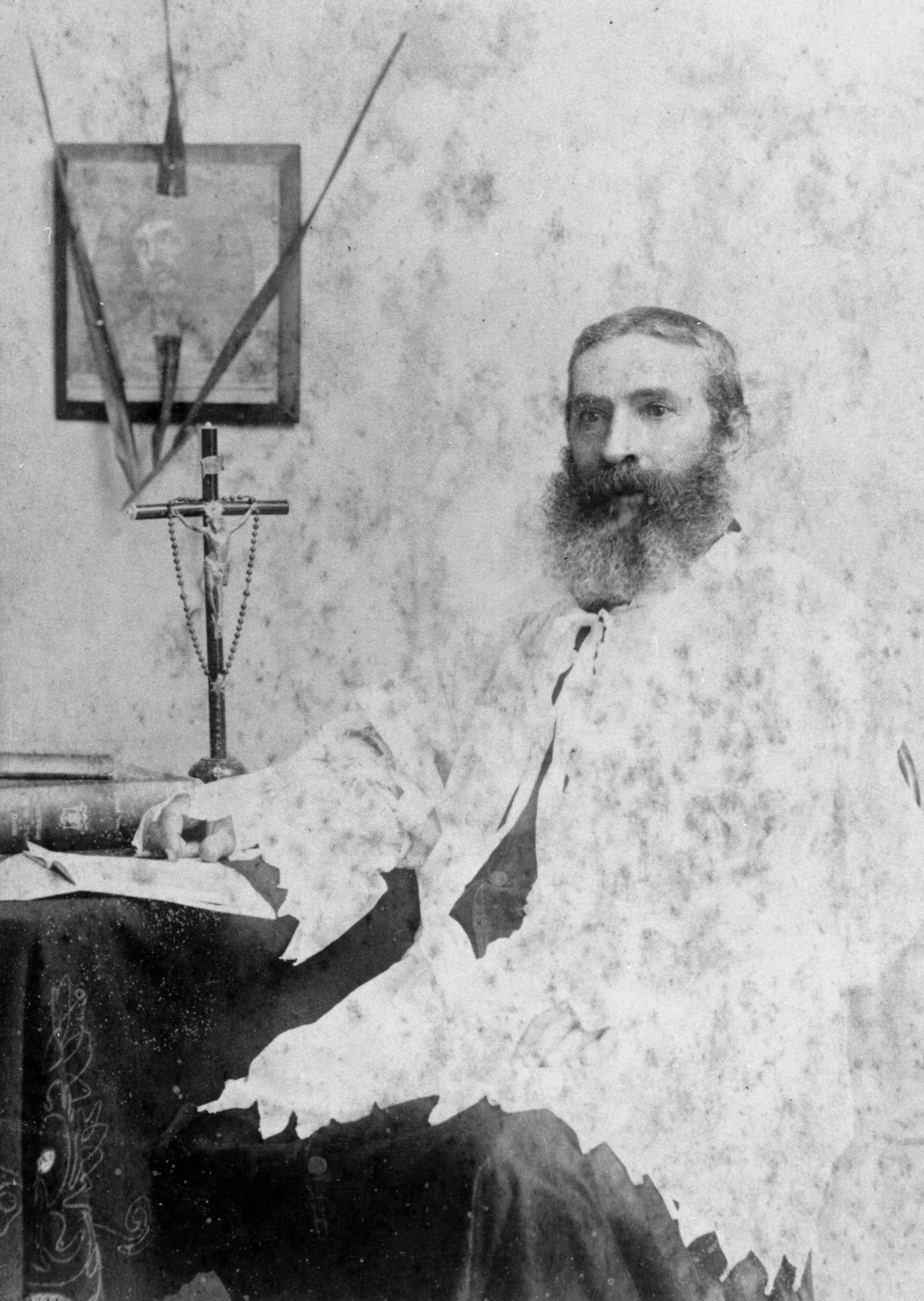
Father Pierre-Marie Bucas

Pierre-Marie Bucas (1840–1930) was a pioneer Roman Catholic priest in Waikato, New Zealand, and Queensland, Australia.

== Early life ==
Bucas was born in the small town of Saint-Jean-la-Poterie, Brittany, France on 21 August 1840. He was the 11th of a family of 12 children. In his childhood he attended the local parochial school and continued his studies in the Petit Seminaire of Sainte Anne D'Auray. He acquired a good knowledge of Greek and Latin.

== Call to missionary work ==
Having completed his schooling, Bucas felt called to become a priest and work as a missionary in foreign countries. He entered the Grand Seminaire des Missions Estrangeres in Paris. This seminary prepared young priests, who, after their ordination, would set sail from France for the distant missions of Africa, China, Japan and the Pacific Islands. These missionaries made a vow never to ask to return to France, but to persevere until death in the service of God wherever they were assigned.

== Enlistment in the Papal Zouves ==
While at the seminary, there was further conflict between the Kingdom of Italy and the Papal States. Hearing the call for volunteers to defend the Papal States, Bucas and some of his fellow seminarians decide to fight for the sacred cause. They travelled to Rome, where they were permitted to enlist in the Papal Zouaves, a military unit. While at Gaeta, Bucas met Pius IX. On hearing Bucas had come from the seminary in Paris, the Pope said that Bucas should return to his studies in the seminary. Bucas knelt and said "Holy Father, I have come to fight, and if needs be, shed my blood for you. I beg your Holiness not to deprive me of this great privilege." The Pope then blessed and thanked Bucas and allowed him remain with the Zouaves. Bucas fought through the whole campaign.

== Return to the seminary ==
At the conclusion of his term of voluntary service in the Zouaves, Bucas had shown such success as a soldier that several of his comrades in the Zouaves tried hard to persuade him to take up a military career. However, he was determined to become a priest and returned to the Grand Seminaire where he was later ordained to the priesthood. About that time Bishop Jean-Baptiste Pompallier, Vicar-Apostolic of Western Oceania, happened to be on a visit to France seeking priests for the Māori mission in New Zealand. Bucas was inspired by the Bishop's description of the mission and he committed himself to missionary work with the island tribes that were still "living in darkness and in the shadow of death." Two of his fellow students, the Sardon brothers, volunteered with him.

== New Zealand ==
After three months' sailing, the group landed in New Zealand. The Sardon brothers had only a brief life in the mission. The elder brother, who had been a barrister before becoming a priest, died of pneumonia; the young brother, some time later, was shipwrecked on the New Zealand coast. Bucas was assigned to the Waikato. Bishop Pompallier supplied him with some provisions for the journey to Waikato, including a double-barrel gun and £4 in cash. Bucas travelled to Waikato accompanied by Māori guides.

Bucas worked as a missionary among the Māori until their insurrection against the British Government. During those years, Bucas had grown to respect the Māori, had learned their language, and was deeply interested in their welfare, both spiritual and practical. The Māori respected him in return. However, the strong relationship between Bucas and the Māori led to the end of his missionary service among the Māori. One day in a secluded location, Bucas accidentally came upon a group of Maoris practising military drills in preparation to fight the British. Seeing they were awkward when using rifles, his military experience prompted him to drill them in the correct use of the rifles. Bucas had not considered the consequences of doing this, but when the British military authorities heard about it, they told Bishop Pompallier that Bucas must be removed from New Zealand. Bucas was taken on board the English Admiral's flagship (where he was treated with courtesy) and taken to Melbourne, Australia.

== Brisbane ==
The Roman Catholic Bishop of Brisbane, James O'Quinn, visited Melbourne. Bucas offered to do missionary work in Queensland, and O'Quinn accepted. Bucas arrived in Brisbane in 1867.

Shortly after Bucas had arrived in Brisbane, the then Governor of Queensland, Sir George Bowen, received his next appointment to be Governor of New Zealand. The Governor of New Zealand at the time, George Grey, had learned the Māori language. Bowen was concerned about taking up the appointment in New Zealand without any knowledge of the Māori language with whom he would have to deal with very tactfully. Hearing of the Governor's predicament, O'Quinn brought Bucas to Government House, and introduced him to Bowen. It was arranged that Bucas should teach Bowen the Māori language Bucas. Bowen proved an apt pupil and when he left for New Zealand, was able to sing Maori songs and make passable speech in the language. The Maoris were surprised but delighted when the new Governor addressed them in their language, and this created positive feelings towards the new Governor.

== Mackay ==
After two years in Brisbane, Bucas become ill. Dr Kevin Izod O'Doherty recommended that Bucas would benefit from a more northern climate. It was decided he should go to Mackay, which he did in company of Thomas Henry Fitzgerald, a successful pioneer sugar planter in the Mackay district.

In 1870, Bucas brought the Sisters of St Joseph of the Sacred Heart to Mackay. Fitzgerald presented them with the first convent and the land surrounding it, on the banks of the Pioneer River. The present convent and school stand on the same site.

Starting in 1874, Father Bucas acquired 1,680 acres (680 ha) of land through a series of purchases in present-day Bucasia, which he used to establish a community for displaced Aboriginal people. He also established the St Joseph's orphanage, operated by the Sisters of St Joseph until 1880, after which it was run by the Sisters of Mercy. In 1884, concerns about malaria resulted in the orphans being relocated in 1885 to the Meteor Park orphanage near Rockhampton (later known as Neerkol). The swamp in the west of the Bucasia locality is still known as Orphanage Swamp (21.0333°S 149.1333°E).

For 12 years, Bucas administered the parish of Mackay with great success.

== Port Douglas ==
Circa July 1880, Bucas was transferred from Mackay to Port Douglas. From there, he travelled overland towards the Gulf of Carpentaria holding services along the way.

== Charters Towers ==
Circa November 1882, Bucas was promoted to the parish of the new goldfield, Charters Towers, where he was assisted by Reverend. W. Hanley and Reverend W. Hackett. The parish was an extremely large one, extending from the Townsville side of Charters Towers to the outback beyond Cloncurry; it is over 600 kilometres (370 mi) from Charters Towers to Cloncurry. At that time, there were no railways and travelling had to be done by coach or packhorses. The priests were often on horseback for long distances.

Circa May 1885, Bucase relocated to Cloncurry.

== Return to Mackay ==
In 1887, Bucas returned to his former parish of Mackay, where he served for another 25 years. He built a magnificent church in Mackay, and also established church buildings in the surrounding rural areas. He was assiduous in his attendance at the hospital and the homes of the sick, and was well-regarded by all as a kindly and sympathetic priest.

== Barcaldine ==
In 1912, due to poor health, Bucas left Mackay for the drier climate of Barcaldine, where he worked with his nephew, Father Julien Plormel. During World War I, Plormel served as an army chaplain for three years, leaving Bucas to manage alone in Barcaldine. Plormel returned in poor health, but continued to serve in Barcaldine, until his health forced him to go to Rockhampton in January 1921 where he died in March 1921. His death was a great blow to Bucas, who was too frail to make the journey to be with Plormel at his death.

== Later life ==
Bucas retired to the Mater Misericordiae Hospital at Rockhampton, nominally to act as chaplain to the Sisters. He had simple living quarters from which he could enjoy the birds and flowers. Physically frail, but still with almost the full use of his faculties, he passed his days in prayer, enjoying the companionship of the Sisters and others who visited to talk or read with him. His other nephew Father Jules Bucas of Coorparoo died unexpectedly after an operation on 26 August 1930 in Brisbane.

Pierre-Marie Bucas died at the Mater Misericordiae Hospital in Rockhampton on 23 October 1930. His funeral was on Friday 24 October 1930 at St Joseph's Catholic Cathedral. He was buried afterwards in Rockhampton Cemetery.

== Legacy ==
In February 1938, the Pioneer Shire Council unanimously voted to rename the town of Seaview to Bucasia after him.

As Bucas had been Mackay's first Catholic priest and had served there for over 40 years in total, there was regret among the Catholics of Mackay that he was not buried in that town. On 17 November 1947, his remains were exhumed in Rockhampton, and, following a number of impressive ceremonies in St Patrick's Catholic church, his remains were re-interred in the Mackay Cemetery.

On Sunday 2 October 1988, a monument to commemorate Bucas and his orphanage was unveiled at Seaview Park in Bucasia Esplanade, Bucasia (21.0348°S 149.1654°E).
