= Birri Gubba =

Aboriginal Australian people of eastern Queensland

The Birri Gubba people, formerly known as Biria, are an Aboriginal Australian people of the state of Queensland.

== Language ==
The Birri Gubba people spoke a number of languages in the Biri language group.

== Country ==
The Biria held sway over some 4,200 square miles (11,000 km^{2}), from the Bowen River north to its junction with the Burdekin. On its eastern flank was the Clarke Range, while its western borders reached the Leichhardt Range. To the south, its territory extended down to Netherdale.

== Alternative names ==
Alternative names for the Biria people include Biriaba, Birigaba, Breeaba, Perembba, Perenbba, and Birri Gubba.

== European contact ==
In 1846, after their ship Peruvian was wrecked, a group of British crew members made it to shore on Birri Gubba land, and were helped to survive by Birri Gubba people. The castaways stayed with various groups for some time, with one, James Morrill, living among the Aboriginal people for around 17 years. His memoir, Sketch of a Residence Among the Aboriginals of Northern Queensland for Seventeen Years tells of his efforts to leave his group of Birra Gubba people on their land, and to encourage harmonious living between the two groups. Today he is seen as an early pioneer of Indigenous land rights in Australia.

The film The Wild One starring Matt Oxley, John Jarratt and Marlena Law, is based on the story of Morrill and the people who took him in, directed by Australian filmmaker Nathan Colquhoun.

== Notable Biri people ==
- Cathy Freeman, Olympic-level athlete
- Jackie Huggins, activist and academic
- Boori Pryor, formerly the joint inaugural Australian Children's Laureate and storyteller
- Gracelyn Smallwood AM, midwife, academic, NAIDOC Person of the Year in 2014
- Samuel Wagan Watson, award-winning poet, narrator, and storyteller
- Sam Watson, activist, writer, lecturer, and storyteller
- Murrawah Johnson environmental activist
- Gordon Bennett, prominent contemporary Indigenous artist

== Sources ==
- Dixon, Robert M. W. (2002). Australian Languages: Their Nature and Development. Vol. 1. Cambridge University Press. ISBN 978-0-521-47378-1.
- Moore, Clive (1990). "Blackgin's Leap: A Window into Aboriginal-European Relations in the Pioneer Valley, Queensland in the 1860s" (PDF). Aboriginal History. 14 (1): 61–79.
- Smyth, Robert Brough (1878). The Aborigines of Victoria: with notes relating to the habits of the natives of other parts of Australia and Tasmania (PDF). Vol. 1. Melbourne: J. Ferres, gov't printer.
- Tindale, Norman Barnett (1974). "Biria (QLD)". Aboriginal Tribes of Australia: Their Terrain, Environmental Controls, Distribution, Limits, and Proper Names. Australian National University Press.
