= Goeng Goeng =

Aboriginal Australian people

The Goeng or Gureng were an Aboriginal Australian people of the state of Queensland. They lived in the area of the area of present-day Gladstone.

== Country ==
The traditional tribal lands of the Goeng, according to Norman Tindale, stretched over an estimated 1,200 square miles (3,100 km^{2}), running from the southern end of Port Curtis to near mouth of Baffle Creek. Their inland extension went as far as the headwaters of the Kolan River, and took in the ManyPeaks Range. Their land also included Lowmead and one of their borders touched Miriam Vale.

== Controversy ==
John Mathew identified the Goeng and the Goreng goreng as the same tribe, though the former is coastal and the latter an inland tribe. (Note: As the accompanying sketch map shows, the neighbours of the Gurang tribe were the Meerooni and Toolooa on the north, the Tarambol on the west, and the Dappil and Wakka on the south. The Gurang territory covered all the basin of the Upper Burnett, from about Gayndah northward, and, relying upon the virtual identity of Curr's Baffle Creek vocabulary with that of the Upper Burnett, in both of which the negative is gurang, the inference seems safe that it embraced the basin of Baffle Creek also, and, therefore, extended right to the coast where that creek debouches.ì) Tindale noted and criticised the conflation.

== Alternative names ==
- Goonine
- Yungkono
- Meeroni
- Maroonee, Meerooni
- Wide Bay tribe (Palmer, 1884)
- ?Yamma

== Sources ==
- "AIATSIS map of Indigenous Australia". AIATSIS. 14 May 2024.
- Breen, Gavan (2016). "W. E Roth and the Study of Aboriginal Languages in Queensland". In Davidson, Iain; McDougall, Russell (eds.). The Roth Family, Anthropology, and Colonial Administration. Routledge. ISBN 978-1-315-41728-8.
- Lauterer, Joseph (1897). "Aboriginal languages of eastern Australia compared". Proceedings of the Royal Society of Queensland. 12. Brisbane: 11–16. doi:10.5962/p.351257. S2CID 257134113.
- Mathew, John (1914). "Note on the Gurang Gurang tribe of Queensland, with vocabulary". Proceedings of the Australasian Association for the Advancement of Science. 14. Sydney: 433–443.
- Mathews, R H (December 1898). "Divisions of Queensland aborigines". Proceedings of the American Philosophical Society. 37 (158). Brisbane: 327–336. JSTOR 983859.
- Mathews, R. H. (1910). "Toara ceremony of the Dippil tribes of Queensland". American Anthropologist. 2 (1): 139–144. doi:10.1525/aa.1900.2.1.02a00090. JSTOR 658865.
- Palmer, Edward (1884). "Notes on Some Australian Tribes". Journal of the Anthropological Institute of Great Britain and Ireland. 13: 276–347. doi:10.2307/2841896. JSTOR 2841896.
- Tindale, Norman Barnett (1974). "Goeng (QLD)". Aboriginal Tribes of Australia: Their Terrain, Environmental Controls, Distribution, Limits, and Proper Names. Australian National University Press. Archived from the original on 13 August 2016.
