= Goreng Goreng =

Freshwater Australian Aboriginal people

The Gooreng Gooreng, also known Kooreng Gooreng, are an inland freshwater Australian Aboriginal people of Queensland, and also a language group. The Goreng Goreng area is between Central West Queensland in the north around Boyne Valley, extending westerly as far as the Great Dividing Range along the Dawes, Auburn, Nogo and Callide Ranges to meet the Wulli Wulli and Ghunghulu to their immediate west over the Great Dividing Range.

== Language ==
Gurang Gurang is member of the Waka-Kabic subgroup of the Pama–Nyungan languages. The word gurang means "nought", and, replicated, was used as a marker for the people. Despite the tribe's relative proximity to Rockhampton, Gureng Gureng language had strong affinities to languages to its south such as Wakka Wakka and Gubbi Gubbi, an affinity that was also cultural.

== Country ==
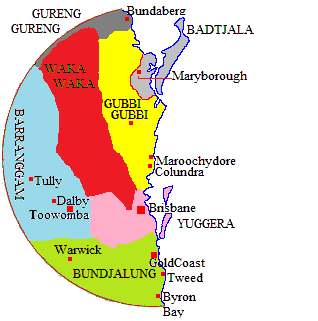
Traditional lands of Aboriginal Australians around Brisbane

The precise borders of traditional Gooreng Gooreng lands have been disputed. Walter Roth, while collecting data on their language in the later 19th century, placed them in Camboon Rawbelle where their main camp was at that time, Jiggings. Norman Tindale distinguished them from a Goeng Meerooni coastal people (1770/Agnes) and defined their land as extending over 2,300 square miles (6,000 km^{2}) and embracing the eastern bank of the upper Burnett River from Mundubbera north to the Callide Ranges and east to Mt Perry Ranges and Many Peaks. It is possible that a confusion arose, taking two distinct dialect forms of the one cultural complex, to denote distinct and separate realities, with the Gureng Gureng taken to be an inland tribe, and the Goeng (Meerooni) (Note: Often called in the old literature the Meeroni, Maroonee, Meerooni people (Ulm 2006, p. 23)) denoting their affines on the coast. A recent survey of the available evidence concludes that the Goreng Goring's lands encompassed the "whole of Boyne Valley to Auburn NoGo Callide Cania Ranges". (Note: Contemporary Goreng Goring state that their lands "extend(ed) from Hawkwood Eidsvold Cania The Dawes Range forms the western boundary at one point, though there is some doubt about the western extent of Gureng Gureng in the southern portion of their territory." (Jolly 1994, p. 4)) No coastal reef dialect language exists as Gooreng Gooreng are inland freshwater people. Their totem is the emu.

== Society and culture ==
The Gureng Gureng were divided into several clans, such as the Wakgun. Traditional lore was transmitted at a djaparlagin or a "singing corroboree".

== History of contact ==
The Upper Burnett area first began to be settled by colonists in the 1840s. Grazing land was not available further down the river for some decades. Hostilities broke out as land seized for grazing denied Aboriginal peoples access to their food resources, and clashes were frequent, leading to several massacres in the Miriam Vale area. It is estimated that between 1847 and 1853, 28 squatters and shepherds were killed as the Burdekin people resisted the onset of the occupation. On each occasion, punitive raids were undertaken to punish the tribes, causing substantial loss of life among the latter. The severity of retaliation was sufficiently drastic to lead the Colonial Office to place the Burnett area's Aboriginal people under official protection by the Native Mounted Police.

== See also ==
- List of Indigenous Australian group names

== Sources ==
- Breen, Gavan (2016). "Walter Roth and the Study of Aboriginal Languages in Queensland". In McDougall, Russell; Davidson, Iain (eds.). The Roth Family, Anthropology, and Colonial Administration. Routledge. pp. 133–156. ISBN 978-1-315-41728-8.
- Dixon, Robert M. W. (2002). Australian Languages: Their Nature and Development. Vol. 1. Cambridge University Press. ISBN 978-0-521-47378-1.
- Fredericks, Bronwyn; Best, Odette (2014). "Introduction". In Fredericks, Bronwyn; Best, Odette (eds.). Yatdjuligin. Cambridge University Press. pp. 1–6. ISBN 978-1-107-62530-3.
- Jolly, Lesley (1994). Gureng Gureng: A Language Program Feasibility Study (PDF). University of Queensland.
- Tindale, Norman (1974a). "Goeng". Aboriginal Tribes of Australia. Australian National University Press. Archived from the original on 2 February 2021.
- Tindale, Norman (1974b). "Korenggoreng". Aboriginal Tribes of Australia. Australian National University Press. Archived from the original on 6 May 2021.
- Ulm, Sean (2006). "The study region: the southern Curtis Coast". In Ulm, Sean (ed.). Coastal Themes: An Archaeology of the Southern Curtis Coast, Queensland. Vol. Terra Australis 24. Australian National University Press. pp. 13–35. ISBN 978-1-920-94296-0. JSTOR j.ctt2jbjh7.6.
