= Miriam Vale War Memorial =

Memorial in Queensland, Australia

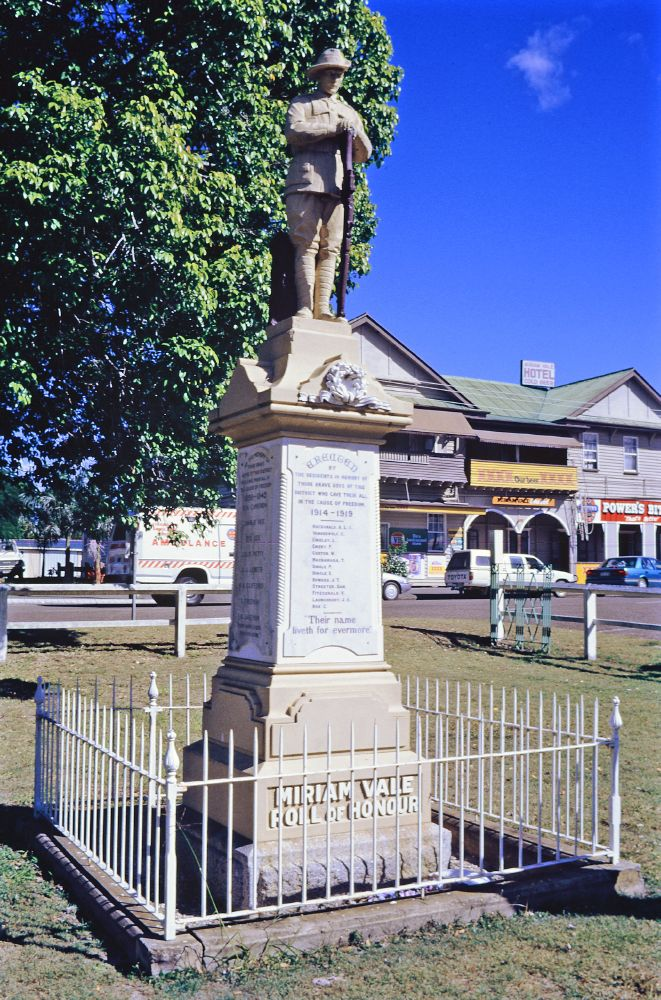
- Miriam Vale War Memorial, 1995

- Location within Queensland
- 24.3293°S 151.5633°E
- Location: Blomfield Street, Miriam Vale, Gladstone Region, Queensland, Australia

History
- Design period: 1919–1930s (interwar period)
- Built: 1921

Queensland Heritage Register
- Official name: Miriam Vale War Memorial
- Type: state heritage (landscape, built)
- Designated: 21 October 1992
- Reference no.: 600725
- Significant period: 1921– (social); 1921–post-WWII (historical, fabric)
- Significant components: fence/wall – perimeter, memorial – soldier statue, flagpole/flagstaff, park / green space, memorial surrounds/railings

Miriam Vale War Memorial is a heritage-listed memorial at Blomfield Street, Miriam Vale, Gladstone Region, Queensland, Australia. It was built in 1921. It was added to the Queensland Heritage Register on 21 October 1992.

== History ==
The Miriam Vale War Memorial was erected in 1921 to commemorate the local men who had given their lives in the World War I. Funds were raised by public subscription and it was designed and erected by the Brisbane firm of AL Petrie & Son at a cost of £238, including the iron fence. Although described in Petrie's account book as a no.8 design, the pedestal was not used for any other of the firm's many soldier-type war monuments throughout Queensland. AL Petrie & Son of Toowong in Brisbane was responsible for more of Queensland's numerous digger monuments than any other masonry firm. They offered a variety of digger monument types and prices, with the Miriam Vale memorial being in the middle of the range.

The memorial was unveiled on 14 December 1921 by John William Fletcher, the Member of the Queensland Legislative Assembly for Port Curtis.

An inscription for those who died on active service in the Second World War was added later. The surrounding timber fence is of more recent origin.

== Description ==
The Miriam Vale War Memorial is located at the southeastern end of a long, narrow, grassed and treed park reserve which runs parallel to the railway line to the east and Bloomfield Street, the principal street in the town of Miriam Vale, to the west. The memorial faces the morning light and the Miriam Vale railway station to the northeast, and provides a principal focus at the southern end of the business sector of town, which has retained an early-to-mid 20th century streetscape.

The memorial comprises a life-sized stone statue of an Australian Infantry soldier standing with head bowed and arms reversed, on a substantial and ornate sandstone pedestal resting on a granite plinth. The pedestal is capped by a gabled cornice with a moulded wreath in the front gable. On all faces of the pedestal are marble plates, the front plate bearing a leaded inscription and the names of 13 "brave boys of this district who gave their all in the cause of freedom 1914–1919". The inscription ends with the words common to British war cemeteries throughout the world: "Their names liveth for evermore". The southeast plate bears a matching inscription for the Second World War and the names of 8 local men who died in the conflict. The words Miriam Vale Roll of Honour are cast on the front face of the concrete base of the pedestal. The monument rests on a rock-faced granite plinth and is surrounded by its original concrete kerb and iron stake fence, with a gate at the southwest corner. The memorial enclosure in turn is defined by a two-rail timber fence with wrought-iron gates at the western corner.

A flagstaff is located at the northern corner of the memorial enclosure, just inside the timber fence, and the memorial is framed by the Big Fig tree to the south, just outside the timber fence but within the larger park reserve. From photographic evidence, this tree and other figs along Bloomfield Street and the cross-street leading to the railway, appear to date to the first decade of the 20th century.

== Heritage listing ==
Miriam Vale War Memorial was listed on the Queensland Heritage Register on 21 October 1992 having satisfied the following criteria.

The place is important in demonstrating the evolution or pattern of Queensland's history.

The Miriam Vale War Memorial is significant historically as one of a group of structures erected by public subscription and intended to endure, which illustrate the conscious expression of emerging Australian nationhood, and which reflect early 20th century public fashion and social attitudes. Importantly, the memorial provides an historical record of local participation and sacrifice in two world wars.

The place demonstrates rare, uncommon or endangered aspects of Queensland's cultural heritage.

Whilst one of a group of similar monuments, the type of pedestal on the Miriam Vale War Memorial is uncommon, the only one so far identified in Queensland.

The place is important in demonstrating the principal characteristics of a particular class of cultural places.

The Miriam Vale War Memorial is significant historically as one of a group of structures erected by public subscription and intended to endure, which illustrate the conscious expression of emerging Australian nationhood, and which reflect early 20th century public fashion and social attitudes.

The place is important because of its aesthetic significance.

Aesthetically, the memorial is significant as a major landmark in the small town of Miriam Vale, and makes a strong contribution to the Bloomfield Street streetscape.

The place has a special association with the life or work of a particular person, group or organisation of importance in Queensland's history.

The memorial also has an important association with the work of stonemasons AL Petrie & Son, who did much to shape the nature of First World War memorials erected in Queensland, in particular popularising the digger monument type, which appears to be more prevalent in Queensland than in other Australian states.
