= Dhungaloo language =

Australian Aboriginal language

Dhungaloo
- Dungaloo
- Native to: Australia
- Region: Queensland
- Extinct: by 2013
- Language family: Pama–Nyungan: Waka–Kabic; Than; Taribelang; Dhungaloo

Language codes
- ISO 639-3: dhx
- Glottolog: dhun1239
- ELP: Dhungaloo

Dhungaloo (Dungaloo) is an extinct Australian Aboriginal language of Queensland. Bowern suggests that it may have been a Maric language. However, AIATSIS has no listing for the name, listing a Dungaloo wordlist under Taribelang (Gureng-Gureng). Glottolog does the same, treating it as a dialect of Gureng Gureng.
