= Bayali =

Bayali may refer to:

- Bayali Atashov, Azerbaijani economist
- Bayali language, an Aboriginal Australian language of the Rockhampton area of Queensland
- Yetimarla language, an Aboriginal language of the Mackenzie/Fitzroy Rivers area in Queensland, also known as Bayali
