= WLU =

WLU may refer to:

== Universities ==
- Washington and Lee University, in Lexington, Virginia, United States
- West Liberty University, in West Liberty, West Virginia, United States
- Wilfrid Laurier University, in Waterloo, Ontario, Canada

== Other uses ==
- Western Labor Union, a defunct trade union of the United States
- Wuliwuli language, an extinct language of Australia
