= Caloplaca sipmanii =

Scientific classification
- Kingdom: Fungi
- Division: Ascomycota
- Class: Lecanoromycetes
- Order: Teloschistales
- Family: Teloschistaceae
- Genus: Caloplaca
- Species: C. sipmanii

Binomial name
- Caloplaca sipmanii S.Y.Kondr., Kärnefelt, Elix & Vondrák (2009)
- Holotype site: Baga National Park, Queensland

Species of lichen

Caloplaca sipmanii is a species of corticolous (bark-dwelling), crustose lichen in the family Teloschistaceae. Found in Queensland, Australia, it was formally described as a new species in 2009 by the lichenologists Sergey Kondratyuk, Ingvar Kärnefelt, John Elix, and Jan Vondrák. The type specimen was collected by the third author from Baga National Park (Rockhampton, Queensland) at an elevation of 50 to 150 m (160 to 490 ft), where it was found growing on Eucalyptus bark. The species epithet of this lichen pays homage to the Dutch lichenologist Harrie Sipman, in whose honour the volume featuring this species was dedicated. Caloplaca sipmanii contains lichexanthone as a major lichen product.

== See also ==
- List of Caloplaca species
