= Miriam Vale =

- Town
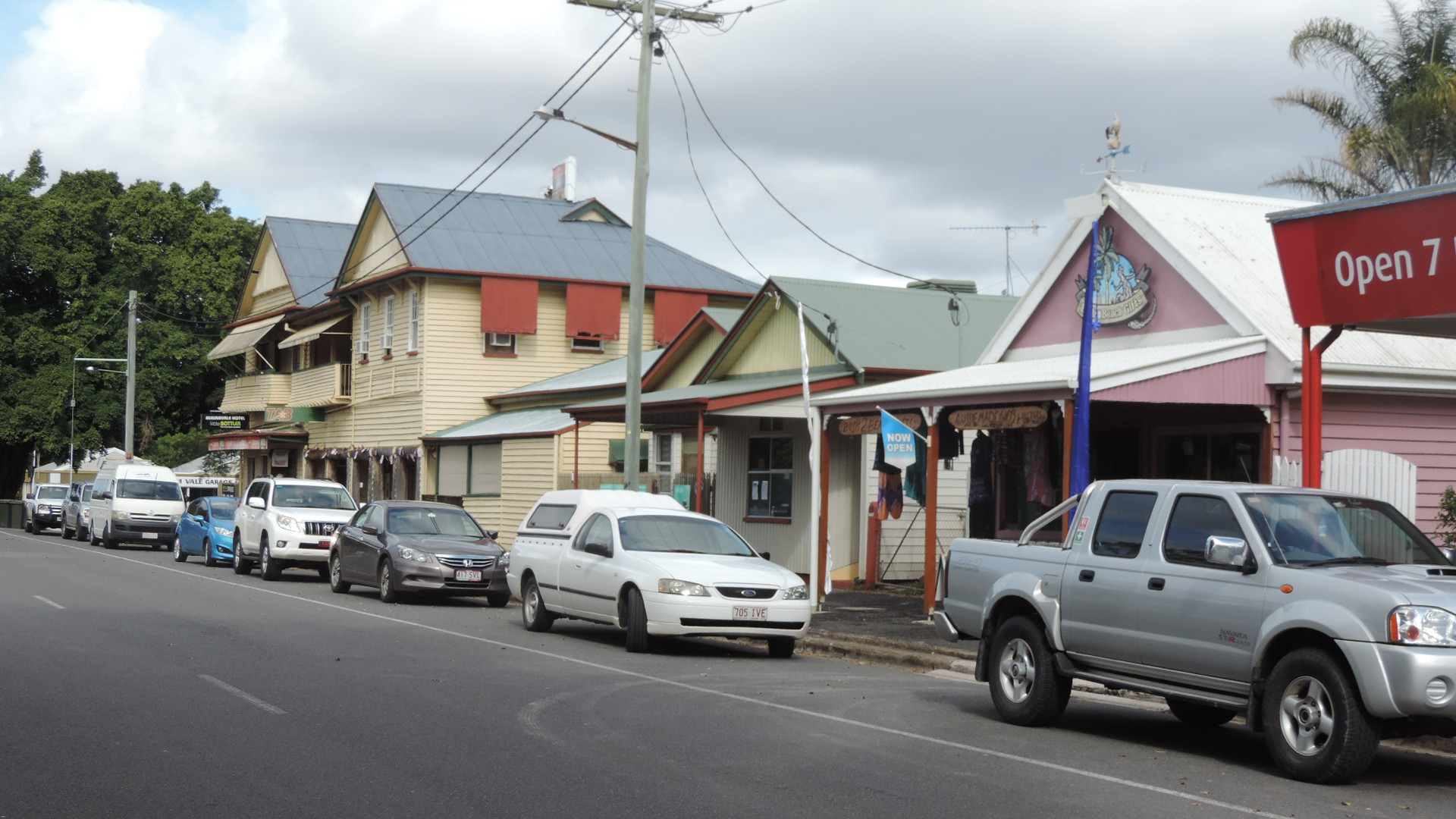
- Blomfield Street (main street looking south-east), 2016

- Interactive map of Miriam Vale
- Coordinates: 24.3272°S 151.5586°E
- Country: Australia
- State: Queensland
- LGA: Gladstone Region
- Location: 51.0 km (31.7 mi) S of Tannum Sands; 68.3 km (42.4 mi) SSE of Gladstone; 169 km (105 mi) SE of Rockhampton; 462 km (287 mi) NNW of Brisbane

Government
  - State electorate: Burnett
  - Federal division: Flynn

Area
  - Total: 43.7 km^{2} (16.9 sq mi)

Population
  - Total: 493 (2021 census)
  - Density: 11.281/km^{2} (29.22/sq mi)
- Time zone: UTC+10:00 (AEST)
- Postcode: 4677
Localities around Miriam Vale
Bororen	Bororen	Mount Tom
Bororen	Miriam Vale	Mount Tom
Colosseum	Colosseum	Mount Tom

Miriam Vale is a rural town and locality in the Gladstone Region, Queensland, Australia. In the 2021 census, the locality of Miriam Vale had a population of 493 people.

== Geography ==
The town is situated on the Bruce Highway, 464 kilometres (288 mi) north of Brisbane, the state capital, and 170 kilometres (110 mi) south of Rockhampton.

== Economy ==
Miriam Vale is renowned as a traditional cattle growing area, and also supports timber, beef and dairy cattle. Tourism is an emerging industry within the shire and the town is a gateway to the tourist resorts of Agnes Water and the Town of 1770.

In the 1970s signs at the entry to town proudly proclaimed "Welcome to Miriam Vale – Cattle, Tobacco, Timber and Dairy". The tobacco industry faded in the late 1970s followed by the dairy industry in the 1990s.

== History ==
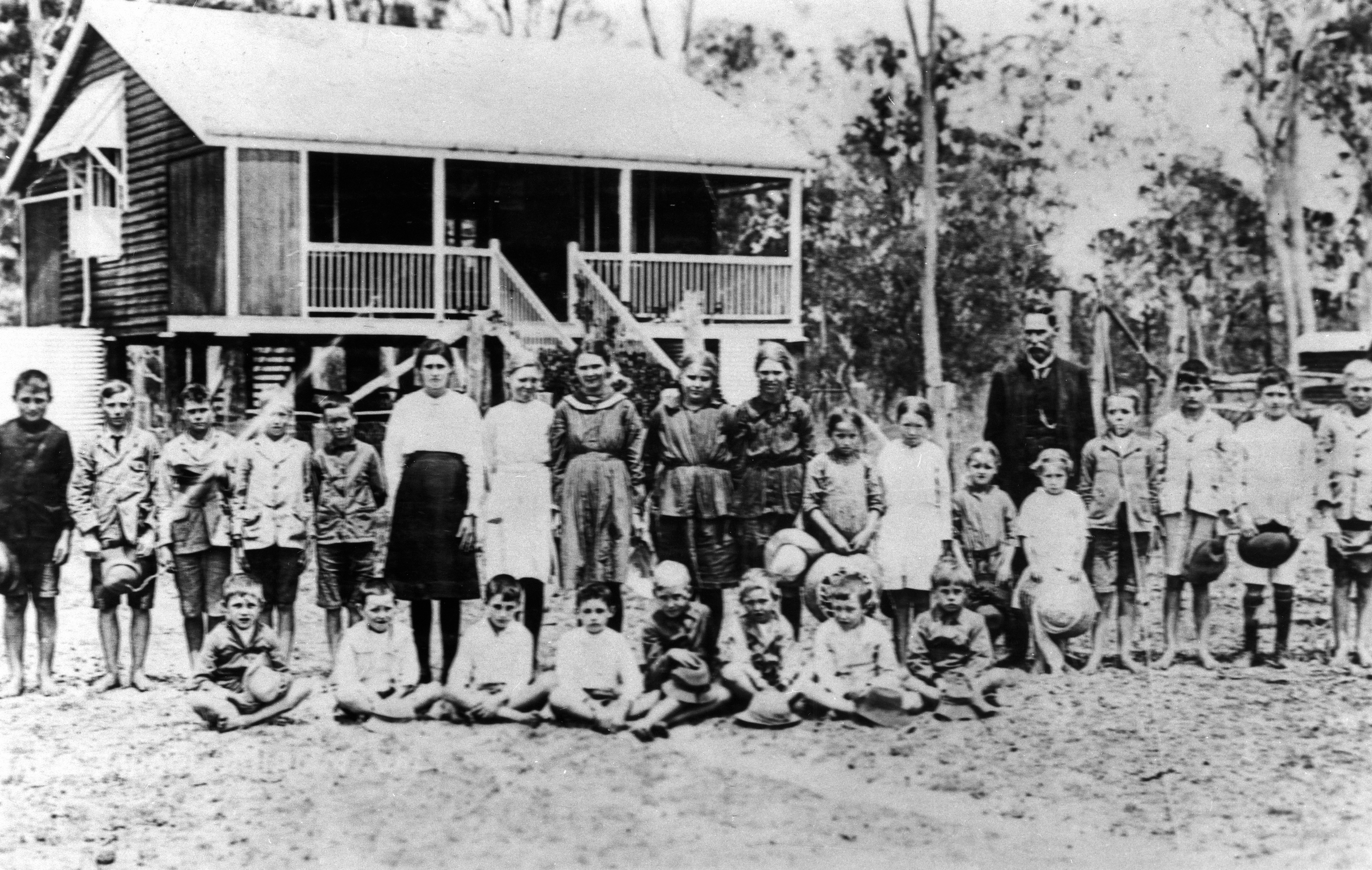
Pupils and teacher outside the Miriam Vale State School, 1918

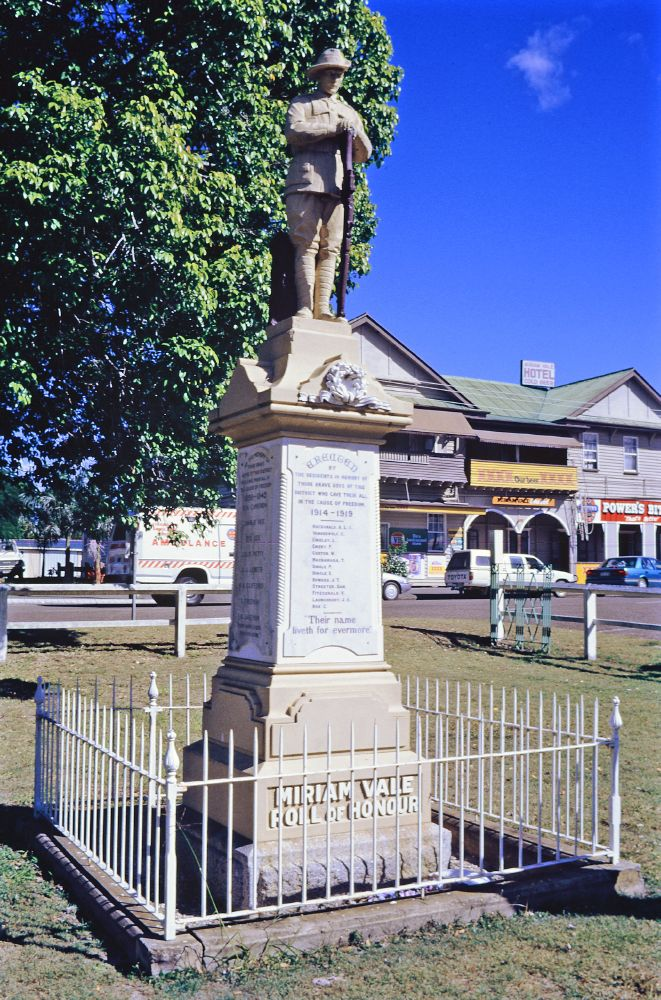
Miriam Vale War Memorial, 1995

Gureng Gureng (also known as Gooreng Gooreng, Goreng Goreng, Goeng, Gurang, Goorang Goorang, Korenggoreng) is an Australian Aboriginal language spoken by the Gureng Gureng people. The Gooreng Gooreng language region includes the towns of Bundaberg, Gin Gin and Miriam Vale extending south towards Childers, inland to Monto and Mt Perry.

Miriam Vale Post Office opened on 1 April 1877.

Miriam Vale Provisional School opened in March 1897 and became Miram Vale State School on 14 July 1897.

St Mary's Anglican Church was opened on Sunday 18 February 1912 by Bishop George Halford. It was a timber church. It was replaced by a new church built circa 1975.

Miriam Vale War Memorial was unveiled on 14 December 1921 by John William Fletcher, the Member of the Queensland Legislative Assembly for Port Curtis.

St Peter Chanel Catholic Church was opened in September 1954 by Bishop Andrew Gerard Tynan. It was a timber church.

=== Dairy industry ===
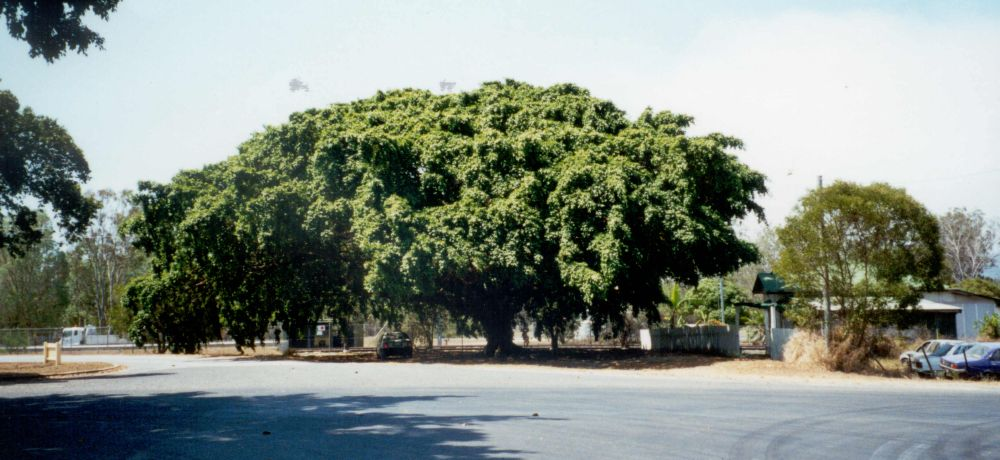
Big Fig Tree

The dairy industry has the most claim to fame with a massive fig tree near the railway station being the drop off point of "cream cans" full of milk. This depot (being no more than a wooden stage) was the district dairy focal point. Locals would deliver the fresh milk to the depot where it was then loaded onto Claude's Truck for the trip to the Port Curtis Dairy (PCD). Fresh milk wasn't always the delivery and in the 1950s cream was separated on farms and delivered to town. Cream in those days was sold on "degrees of Rancid" (fresh, ripe, stale) as there was no refrigeration. The cream even then was going to the PCD in Gladstone.

=== Racing ===
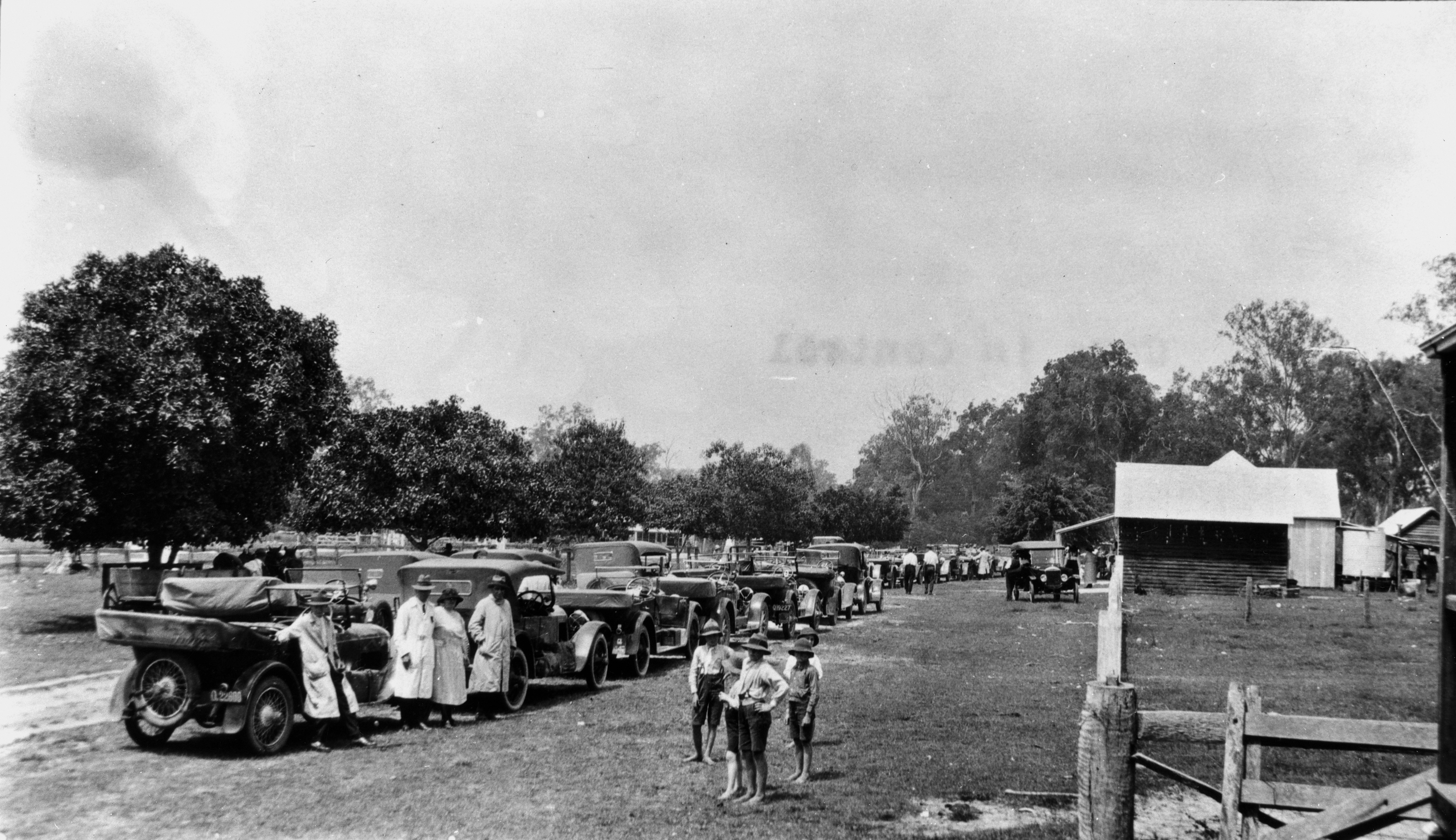
Car rally in the Main Street of Miriam Vale, 1924

A car rally passed through Miriam Vale in 1924; the stretch of road between Miriam Vale and Gin Gin was said to the roughest of the rally.

== Demographics ==
In the 2006 census, the locality of Miriam Vale had a population of 361 people.

In the 2011 census, the locality of Miriam Vale had a population of 422 people.

In the 2016 census, the locality of Miriam Vale had a population of 512 people.

In the 2021 census, the locality of Miriam Vale had a population of 493 people.

== Heritage listings ==
Miriam Vale has a number of heritage-listed sites, including

- Miriam Vale War Memorial, Blomfield Street (24.3293°S 151.5633°E)
- Big Fig, Station Street (24.3292°S 151.5637°E

== Education ==
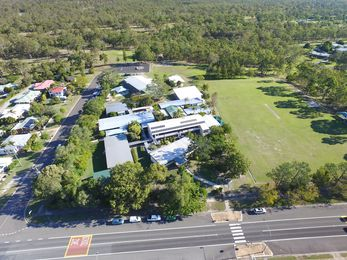
Aerial view of Miram Vale State School, 2022

Miriam Vale State School is a government primary and secondary (Prep-10) school for boys and girls at 15 Roe Street (24.3297°S 151.5616°E). In 2017, the school had an enrolment of 135 students with 17 teachers (14 full-time equivalent) and 12 non-teaching staff (8 full-time equivalent). In 2018, the school had an enrolment of 129 students with 17 teachers (14 full-time equivalent) and 11 non-teaching staff (8 full-time equivalent). In 2023, the school had an enrolment of 129 students with 13 teachers (11 full-time equivalent) and 13 non-teaching staff (9 full-time equivalent).

For secondary schooling beyond Year 10, students go to Tannum Sands State High School in Tannum Sands to the north.

== Amenities ==
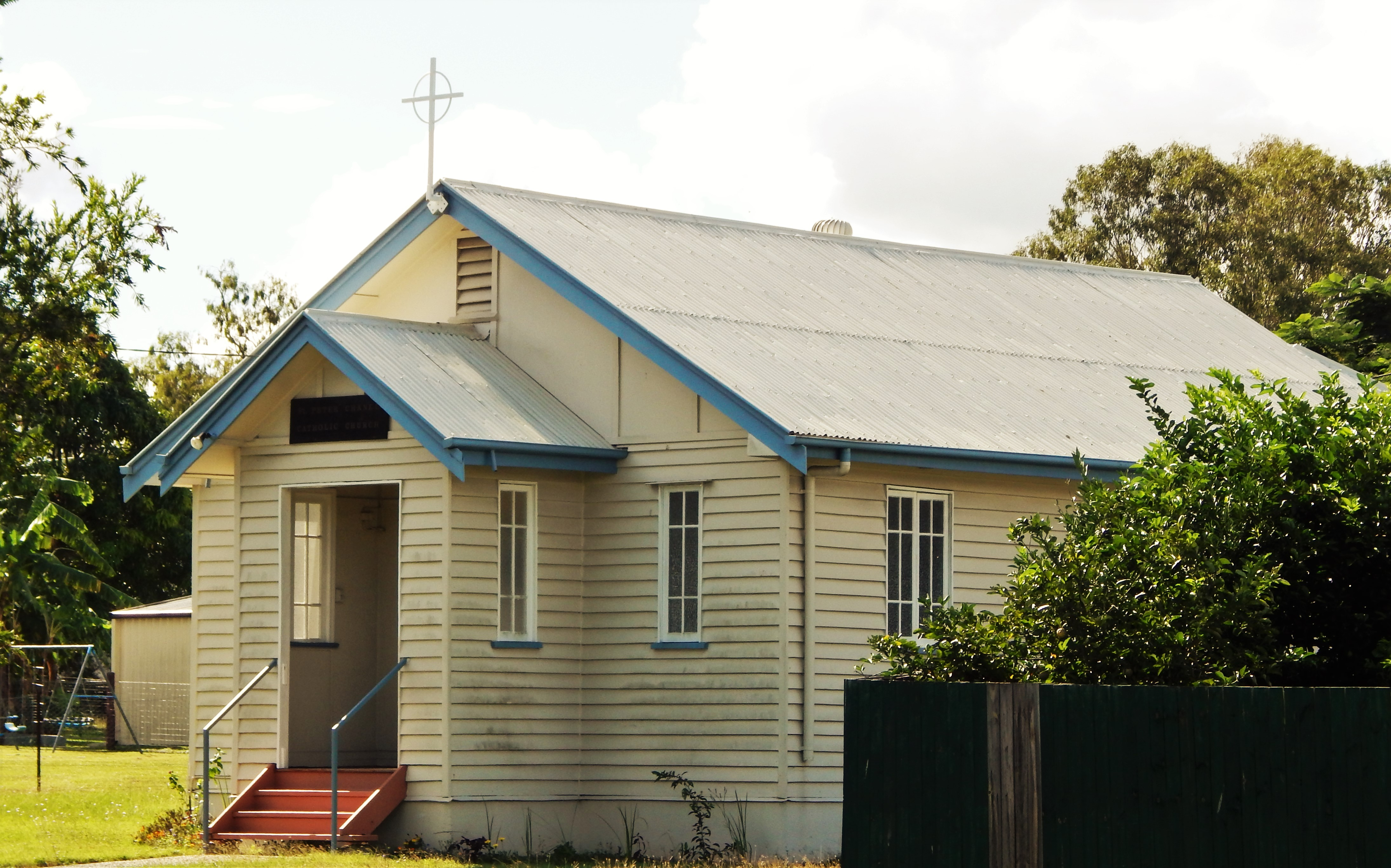
St Peter Chanel Catholic Church, 2022

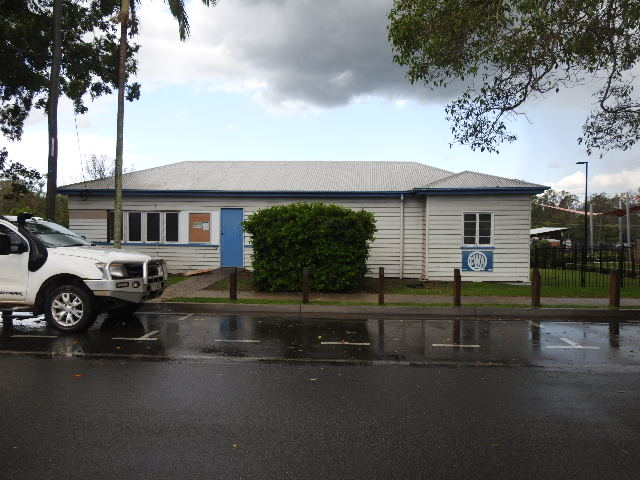
Country Women's Association building, Blomfield Street (October 2022).

The Miriam Vale Library is at 41 Blomfield Street; it is operated by the Gladstone Regional Council.

There is a Gladstone Regional Council administration centre at 36 Roe Street.

The Miriam Vale branch of the Queensland Country Women's Association meets at the QCWA Hall at Blomfield Street.

St Peter Chanel Catholic Church is at 40 Bruce Highway (24.327753°S 151.5592°E).

St Mary's Anglican Church is at 10 Larson Street (24.330638°S 151.5637°E). It is part of the parish of Boyne River within the Anglican Church of Central Queensland.

== Attractions ==
Miriam Vale has a nine-hole golf course with small greens and mature gum trees.

== Transport ==
Miram Vale is on the North Coast railway line and is serviced by the Miriam Vale railway station.

Long Distance services
Inbound	Service	Outbound
Bundaberg	The Sunlander	Gladstone
Bundaberg	Electric Tilt Train	Gladstone
Bundaberg	Spirit of the Outback	Gladstone
