= Ngaygungu people =

Aboriginal Australian people

- Aka: Ngai-kungo-i
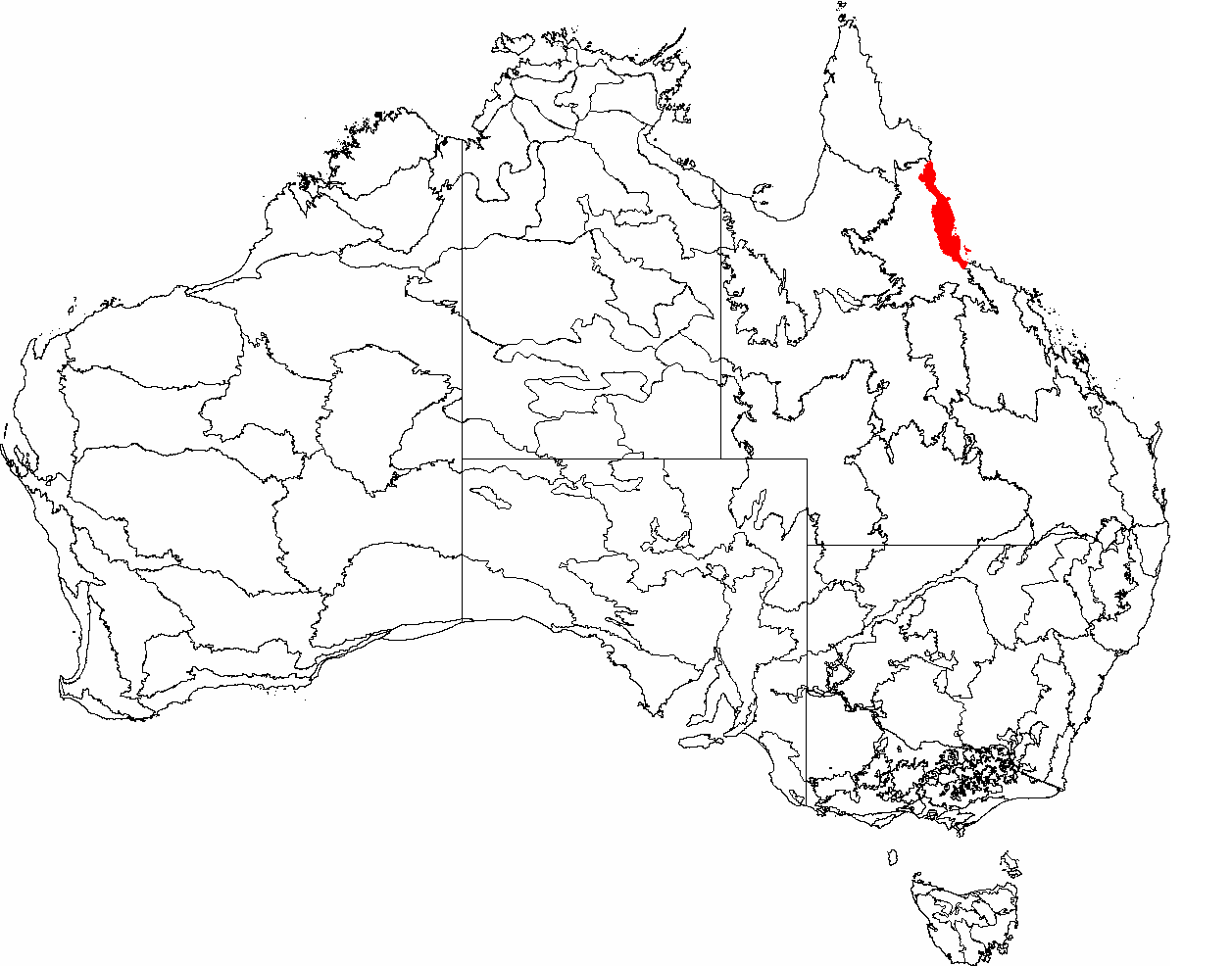
- Wet Tropics BioRegion

Language
- Language Family: Pama–Nyungan
- Language Branch: Maric
- Language Group: Ngaygungu
- BioRegion: Wet Tropics
- Location: Far North Queensland
- Coordinates: 17°15′45″S 145°28′37″E
- Urban Areas: Atherton, Queensland

Ngaygungu people (also known as Ngaygungyi, Ngȋ-koongō-ī or Ngai-kungo-i) are the people from the Atherton, Queensland area who spoke, or whose ancestors once spoke, the Ngaygungu language.

== Range ==
The Ngai-kungo-i were formally identified as a distinct locally indigenous group for Atherton, Queensland by Walter Edmund Roth in October 1898, when he encountered Aboriginal people identifying as Ngai-kungo-i, speaking their own language named Ngai-kungo based in Atherton (which they called Kȃr-kar), and described as having ranged (went "walk-about") up into the Great Dividing Range behind Atherton, crossing the headwaters of the Walsh River (an area they called Balkan) wandering out to the township of Watsonville (an area they called Ilȃnbare).

== Material culture ==
In addition to the Ngai-kungo-i being encountered and identified as having a base in Atherton, Roth also wrote about and collected samples of their material culture, much of which were later purchased from Roth by the Australian Museum.

== Sources ==
- Dixon, Robert (2002). Australian languages: their nature and development. Cambridge University Press. ISBN 0-521-47378-0. OCLC 70724682.
- Khan, Kath E (1993). "Catalogue of the Roth Collection of Aboriginal artefacts from north Queensland. Volume 1. Items collected from Archer River, Atherton, Bathurst Head, Bloomfield River and Butcher's Hill, 1897–1901" (PDF). Technical Reports of the Australian Museum. 10 (1): 1–205. doi:10.3853/j.1031-8062.10.1993.69.
- Roth, Walter E (1898), Some ethnological notes on the Atherton blacks (October 1898), Cooktown: Queensland Home Secretarys Department, Office of the Northern Protector of Aboriginals
- Roth, Walter E (1910). "North Queensland Ethnography. Bulletin No. 18. Social and individual nomenclature" (PDF). Records of the Australian Museum. 8 (1): 79–106. doi:10.3853/j.0067-1975.8.1910.936.
