= Goreng =

Goreng may refer to:

- Indonesian and Malaysian word referring to fried food:

- Indonesian cuisine
- Malaysian cuisine
- Singaporean cuisine

- Goreng people
  - Goreng language, an extinct Australian Aboriginal language

== See also ==
- Goreng goreng
