= Mount Baga =

Mountain in Queensland, Australia

- Location within Queensland

Highest point
- Coordinates: 23°12′56″S 150°37′46″E

Geography
- Location: Queensland, Australia

Mount Baga (formerly Mount Jim Crow) is a trachyte plug that lies between Rockhampton and Yeppoon, Australia. Standing at approximately 150 m above the surrounding plains (221 m above sea level), Mount Baga affords a panoramic view of the surrounding landscape. Mount Wheeler (now Mount Gai-i) can be seen to the southeast, while many other trachyte formations can be seen to the north and west.

Well covered by trees and scrub, Mount Baga has an unsigned but marked walking trail to the peak. Climbing the steep slope is recommended for those with suitable fitness and experience. The surface consists mostly of broken shale rock and can be slippery in places. It is highly recommended that climbers stay on the designated path at all times. There are several small but sheer cliffs, mostly on the southeastern face, which can be clearly seen from the Capricorn Highway.

Mount Baga holds a significance to the Darumbal Aboriginal people and its creation is told in a Dreaming legend:

In the Dreamtime long ago, a boy and a girl from the tribe fell in love and wanted to marry. The old people were distraught as it was against the tribal code to marry someone from the same totem. The couple took no notice, running away to hide in the flat scrub of what is now Mount Baga. The Rainbow Serpent (named Munda-Gadda in the local dialect), sitting up on Mount Gai-i (to the south-east) saw the dilemma and decided to intervene. He spun himself around between the girl and boy with such force, bringing up trees and dirt until a mountain appeared separating the couple. His powers frightened the couple and from then on they abided by the tribal code.

The mountain's name caused controversy due to the fact it most likely is named after the US Jim Crow laws, although the circumstances in which this name was applied to the mountain are unclear.

For these reasons and to better reflect the importance of the mountain to the Darumbal people, the name was changed to Mount Baga.

== See also ==
- List of mountains in Australia
- Baga National Park
