= Kingkel languages =

Family of Australian Aboriginal languages

Kingkel
- Rockhampton–Gladstone
- Geographic distribution: Queensland
- Linguistic classification: Pama–Nyungan: Maric?; Kingkel
- Subdivisions: Bayali; Dharumbal

Language codes
- Glottolog: rock1234

Kingkel is a putative small branch of the Pama–Nyungan family in Queensland, consisting of:

- Bayali
- Dharumbal.

The two languages are not close.

Bowern (2011) reclassified Darumbal as a Maric language, but did not address Bayali. Bouckaert, Bower, and Atkinson (2018), based on more data and languages of the region, classify Darumbal as a sister of Mbabaram (and therefore related to Maric languages, though as the first to branch off within that group). Bayali is grouped with the Waka-Kabi languages to the south.

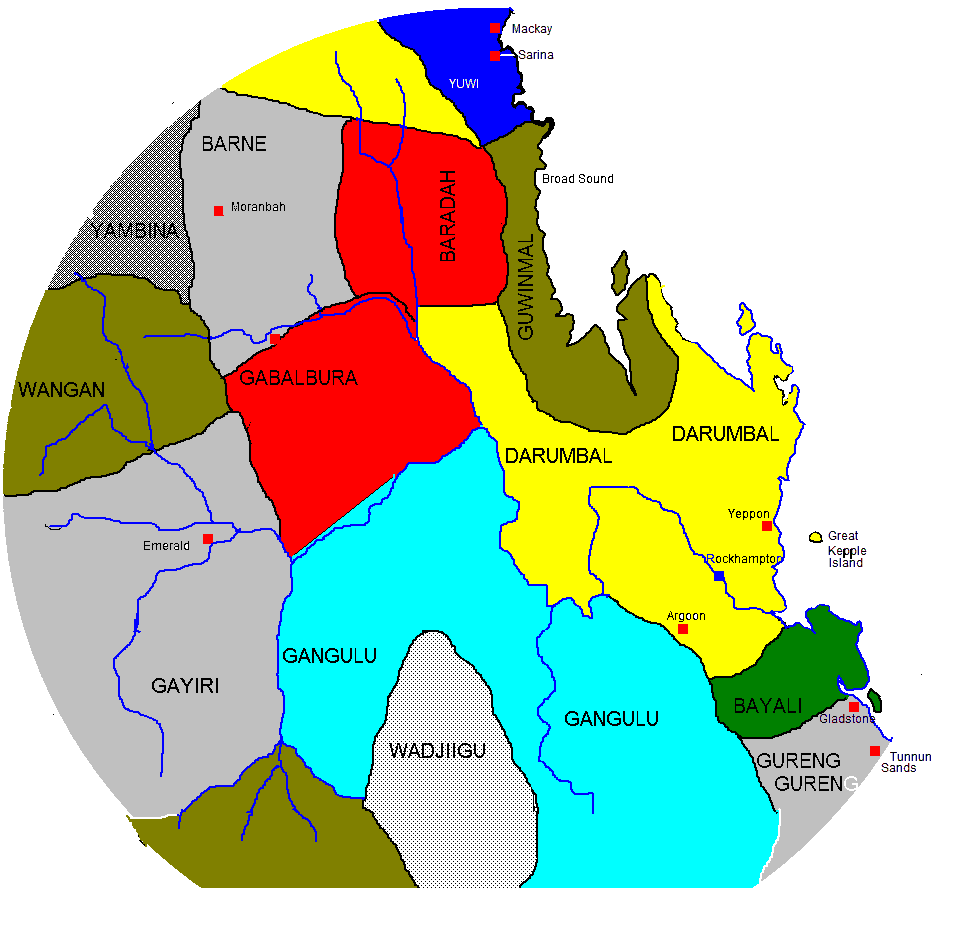
Traditional lands of Aboriginal people around Mackay, Rockhampton and Gladstone, Queensland
