= Gai-i =

Mountain in Queensland, Australia

- Mt Wheeler
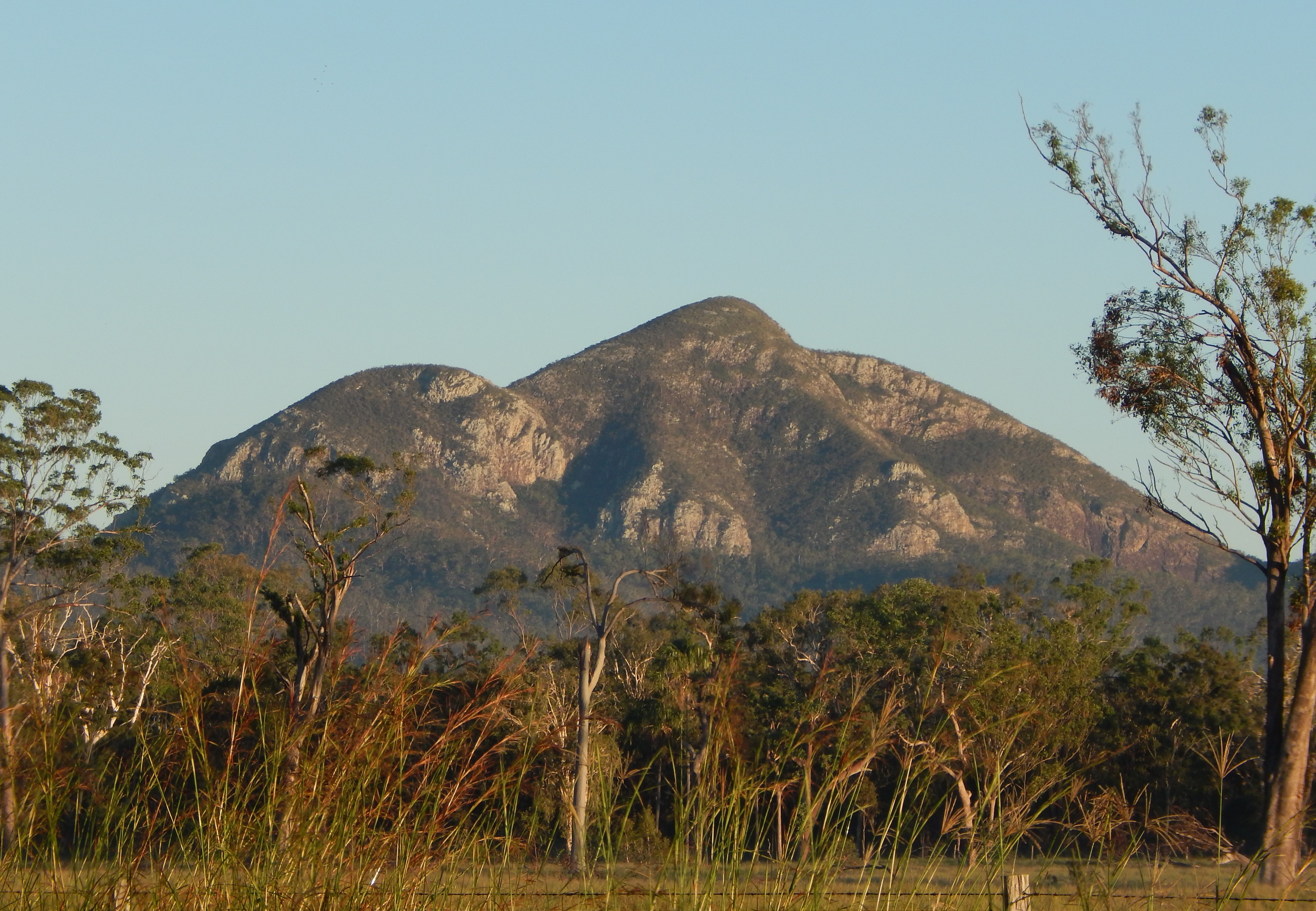
- Gai-i, 2015

Highest point
- Coordinates: 23°14′S 150°41′E

Geography
- Location within Queensland

Gai-i (previously known as Mount Wheeler) is a small mountain situated between Rockhampton and Yeppoon in the state of Queensland, Australia. It is one of several igneous volcanic plug formations that feature on the landscape near the Capricorn Coast. The mountain is situated on a site known as Gawula, which is administered by the Gawula Aboriginal Land Trust. Traditionally home to a group of Aboriginal Australians known as the Darumbal people, it was returned to them in 2007 under the Aboriginal Land Act.

== History ==
Gawula is the traditional home of the Darumbal people. Many indigenous groups from the region would meet at this site to exchange tools and arrange marriages.

A confrontation between early European settlers and the Aboriginal Darumbal people reportedly occurred on or near Mt Wheeler, involving a number of Aboriginal deaths.

In 1868 gold was found on the mountain. While initial mining was successful, a report in 1887 states that one of the largest gold nuggets in Queensland was found there; the same report also indicates that the mining success quickly petered out.

More recently Mt Wheeler became something of a lookout spot for scenic views during the 20th century, and has been used as a Recreation Reserve for bushwalking and mountain biking.

In 2007, ownership of the mountain was handed over to 25 trustees representing the Darumbal, the traditional owners of the mountain. The deed of grant to the Gawula Aboriginal Land Trust was the first in the Rockhampton region under the Aboriginal Land Act (1991).

== Naming ==
According to local historians, Gai-i was given the name Mount Cock’s Comb by Captain Cook in 1770. However this is not corroborated by Cook's Endeavour journal or other sources. The mountain was later named Mt Wheeler. Although some have suggested it was named after Frederick Wheeler, an inspector with the Native Police, who is alleged to have been involved in a massacre of Aboriginal people at the site, forcing them to jump off the cliffs by the hundreds - archival evidence suggests it was more likely named such after Gold Commissioner John Wheeler who worked in the area during the 1860s. The name of the mountain was officially changed to Gai-i in 2018.

== Physical features ==
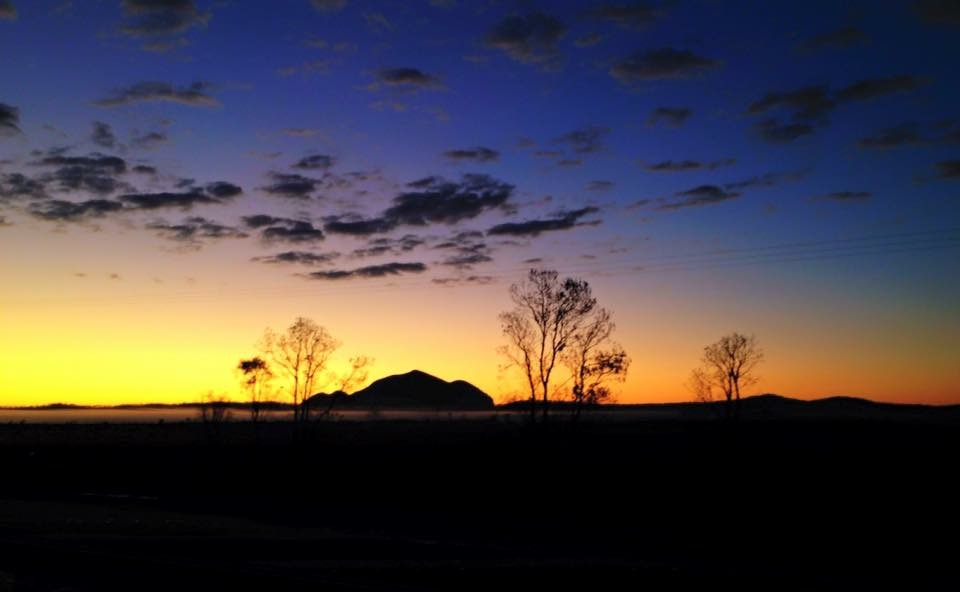
Gai-i at sunset

Gai-i is a steep-sided volcanic plug, similar to other surrounding mountains like Mount Baga and Pine Mountain.

There are large cliffs on its western face. On the south-east face is a type of soft rock which has formed into many huge caverns and overhangs. Mount Gai-i stands at approximately 365 metres (1,198 ft) high.

== See also ==
- List of mountains in Australia
