= Waka–Kabic languages =

Group of aboriginal Australian languages

Waka–Kabic
- Waka-Gabi
- Geographic distribution: Queensland
- Linguistic classification: Pama–Nyungan: Southeast; North Coast; Waka–Kabic

Language codes
- Glottolog: waka1283
- Waka–Kabic languages (green) among Pama–Nyungan (tan). The Kingkel languages are the small area on the coast to the north.

The Waka–Kabic (Waka-Gabi) languages form a nearly extinct family of Pama–Nyungan languages of Australia.

- Waka–Kabic
  - Than
    - Taribelang
    - Gubbi Gubbi (Kabikabi)
      - Batjala
    - Tulua
  - Miyan
    - Wulli Wulli
    - Wakka Wakka
    - Barunggam (Muringam)

Miyan may be a single language, Wakawaka. Batjala, a possible dialect of Gubbi Gubbi, still has 89 speakers in 2021, and Taribelang still has some L2 speakers.

The Kingkel languages, Darumbal and Bayali, are sometimes believed to be Waka-Kabic. Bowern (2011) moved Darumbal to the Maric languages, but did not address Bayali. The two languages are not close.
