= Yiman language =

Australian Aboriginal language of Queensland

Yiman
- (unverified)
- Native to: Australia
- Region: Queensland
- Ethnicity: Yiman
- Extinct: (date missing)
- Language family: Pama–Nyungan: (possibly Maric); (ethnically Bidjara); Yiman

Language codes
- ISO 639-3: –
- Glottolog: None
- AIATSIS: E31

The Yiman language (also spelt Yeeman, Yimun, Jimun, Yiiman, Jiman, Iman, and Emon) is an Australian Aboriginal language of Queensland. Ethnically the speakers were Bidjara; that and geography suggests that it may have been a Maric language, assuming it was a distinct language at all. It is attested in a word list collected by Meston and held in the State Library of Queensland, but as of 2014 the data had not been verified by the Australian Institute of Aboriginal and Torres Strait Islander Studies.

== Language revival ==
Since 2017, the Central Queensland Language Centre has been working on helping to restore three languages from the region – Yiiman, Bayali (Byelle) and Taribelang.

There is as of 2020 a language revival project under way to document and revive the language. "Yeeman" is listed as one of 20 languages prioritised as part of the Priority Languages Support Project, being undertaken by First Languages Australia and funded by the Department of Communications and the Arts. The project aims to "identify and document critically-endangered languages — those languages for which little or no documentation exists, where no recordings have previously been made, but where there are living speakers".
