= Wulli Wulli dialect =

Extinct Australian Aboriginal language

Wuliwuli
- Wuli Wuli, Wulli Wulli
- Native to: Australia
- Region: Queensland
- Ethnicity: Wulili
- Extinct: (date missing)
- Language family: Pama–Nyungan: Waka–Kabic; Miyan; Wakka Wakka; Wuliwuli

Language codes
- ISO 639-3: wlu
- Glottolog: wuli1242
- AIATSIS: E89

Wuliwuli (also Wuli Wuli, Wulli Wulli) is an extinct Australian Aboriginal language of the Pama–Nyungan language family formerly spoken by the Wulli Wulli people in Queensland, Australia. Wuliwuli is regarded as a dialect of Wakka Wakka.

== Geographic distribution ==
The Wulli Wulli language region includes the landscape within the local government boundaries of the North Burnett Regional Council, particularly the town of Eidsvold and the Auburn River catchment, including the properties of Walloon, Camboon, and Hawkwood.

== Names ==
The alternate names for Wuliwuli are Wilili, Wililililee, Willillee, Wuli Wuli, Wulili, Wulilli, and Wulli Wulli.

The name Wuliwuli is from the personal pronoun wuli, meaning "they".

== Phonology ==
The phonetic system of Wuliwuli is the same as that of Wakka Wakka and Barunggan.

== Grammar ==
Stem structure, the rules surrounding derivation, and the derivative suffixes are largely the same as in Wakka Wakka and Barunggan.

Locatives are expressed by the ablative affix. Allatives are expressed either by the ablative, or the postpositions gu or gua. Perlatives can also be found.

=== Nouns ===
Examples of nominal derivational suffixes include -gan (feminine suffix, e.g. ɲuam "husband", ɲuamgan "wife") and -ŋal (sociative suffix, e.g. bulu or buluŋ "stomach, belly", buluŋal "pregnant").

The articles used are -bam and -ᶁin. Whether there is a difference in meaning between the two is unclear (e.g. murunbam or murunᶁin "(some) dark people"), although -ᶁin may be used for relationship terms. On occasion both suffixes can be joined together (e.g. ginbam or ginbamᶁin, "(some) women").

==== Pronouns ====
The table below shows paradigms for the recorded pronouns in Wulli Wulli:

	Nominative	Ergative	Objective	Possessive
First person singular	ŋia	ŋaᶁu, ᶁu	ŋaɲa	ŋa˙ri (-riɲ)
Second person singular	ŋin	ŋindu	ŋina, na	ŋingari
Third person singular	jo˙, ja	jalu, jaru, ru	jaŋa, ŋa	?
First person dual	ŋam	ŋambu, ŋamundu	?	?
Second person dual	ɲiwam, ŋo˙m	?	?	?
Third person dual	wulam	bulambu	?	?
First person plural	ŋai	?	?	?
Third person plural	wuli, li (-li)	wuliru	wuliŋa	?

Compound forms are also found (e.g. ŋam ŋin "we two, you and me" (inclusive)).

The possessive pronoun ŋariɲ "my, mine" was found in the corpus with the article -ᶁin.

The demonstrative pronouns are gana, gara "here, this" and mana, mara "there, that", with no inflectional forms recorded. Examples include gana jo˙ bai "he has come here" and mana jo˙ ba˙n "he is coming there". There seem to be shortened forms na and ra (-ra) (although the former is ambiguous as -na is an imperfective suffix).

The interrogative pronouns are ŋana "who?" and miɲa "what?", with the following inflectional forms recorded:

	Nominative	Ergative	Objective	Allative
ŋana	ŋana	ŋandu	ŋana	?
miɲa	miɲa	?	?	miɲaŋgu

=== Verbs ===
Examples of verbal derivational suffixes include -ma- (causative, e.g. garima "put in"), -la- or -le- (associative, e.g. gaila "look for") and -ŋi- (e.g. gilaŋi "turn around").

There are two regular patterns of conjugation, in addition to irregular ones. The first uses -j- as the "thematic element"; the imperfective ends in -ena, whereas the intentional ends in -wa. The second uses a nasal (-n-, -ɲ-); the imperfective may end in -na, the perfective in -ɲi, and the intentional in -wa.

== Vocabulary ==
Some words from the Wulli Wulli language, as spelt and written by Wulli Wulli authors include:

- Ban: grass
- Djigum: sun
- Dungir: river
- Gahr: echidna
- Gamba dunba: good day
- Goolah: koala
- Gung: water
- Gunyar: bird
- Guraman: kangaroo
- Guyu: fish
- Moran: home/camp
- Nyilung: land
- Wangun: snake
