= Big Fig, Miriam Vale =

Big Fig
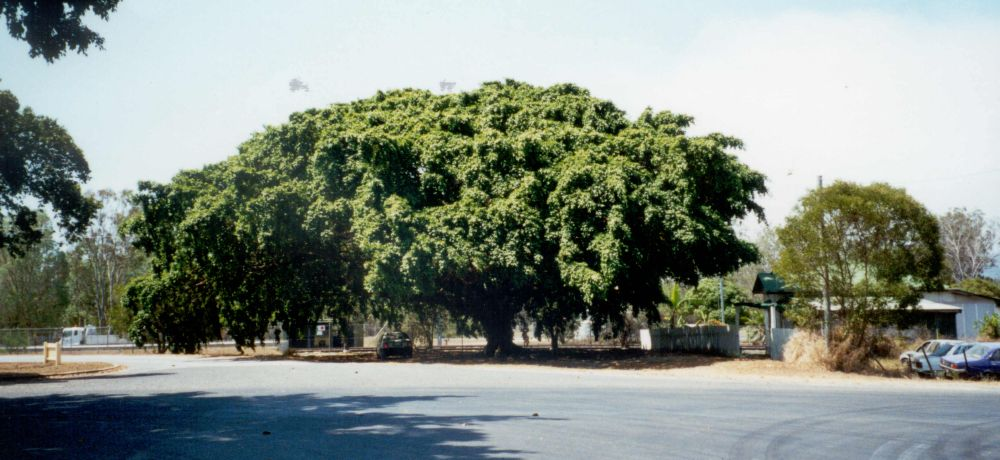
- Big Fig

- Location within Queensland Location within Australia
- 24.3292°S 151.5637°E
- Location: Station Street, Miriam Vale, Gladstone Region, Queensland, Australia

Queensland Heritage Register
- Official name: Big Fig
- Type: state heritage (landscape)
- Designated: 6 January 2004
- Reference no.: 602323
- Significant period: 1897–c. 1900 (historical)

Big Fig is a heritage-listed weeping fig tree situated at Station Street, Miriam Vale, Gladstone Region, Queensland, Australia. It was added to the Queensland Heritage Register on 6 January 2004.

== History ==
The Big Fig at Miriam Vale is thought to have been planted around the turn of the 19th and 20th centuries, local residents recalling the Fig Tree as being well established by the 1920s. Or it may have been the fig tree planted "about a chain from the main entrance of the railway station" in 1916 by the Miriam Vale Progress Association. Whatever its origins, it became a focus for community activity, both social and economic, through much of the 20th century. The tree is a well-known landmark and meeting place in the town, and until 1977 served as the site for the collection of local cream and milk for rail or road transportation to Gladstone, dairying being an important economic activity in the Miriam Vale district.

Miriam Vale pastoral run was one of the earliest established in the Port Curtis district, reputedly taken up in January 1854 by Arthur PJ Chauvel and Joseph Sharp, along with the runs of Urquhart, Polmaily and Walton, soon after the proclamation of the Port Curtis Pastoral District on 10 January 1854. Acceptance of their tender for these runs did not appear in the New South Wales Government Gazette until 9 June 1857. Walter Blomfield, reminiscing in 1949, states that cousins Edwin Cordeaux Blomfield (Walter's father) and EK Cox purchased the lease, along with 8,000 sheep, in 1856, although the lease was not recorded in Queensland as being transferred to Cox and Bloomfield until 1869. Early squatters in the area concentrated on wool production, exporting their produce via Gladstone, which was established in 1853–54.

In 1868 Cox and Bloomfield applied under the conditions of the Crown Lands Alienation Act of 1868 for their runs Woodlands, Miriam Vale and Polmaily to be consolidated as the Miriam Vale run and Silex, Ilex and Gochen to be consolidated as Bulburan. Miriam Vale was divided into resumed and leasehold sections in 1869/70, but there was little demand to open this land for selection. Some Miriam Vale land had been taken up as freehold by 1884. In January 1875 a telegraph office was opened at Miriam Vale, and a post office was established there in April 1877, reflecting a population increase in the district.

The first Miriam Vale selections were made available in 1889, encouraging new settlers into the area. Saw milling was an important adjunct industry, as the land was cleared for grazing or agriculture. Miriam Vale was first listed as a separate district in the Queensland Post Office Directory of 1892. It had a population of about 60, but no real township. The post office was located at Miriam Vale, but closest settlement appears to have been in the Mount Jacob area at that time. In 1893 the Miriam Vale Hotel was established and the Miriam Vale Post and Telegraph Office was made official.

The township of Miriam Vale was surveyed in 1895 in anticipation of completion in 1896–97 of the final segment of the Gladstone-Bundaberg section of the North Coast Railway. The route passed close to the Miriam Vale Post and Telegraph Office on House Creek, and the Miriam Vale railway station and township were established in the vicinity. The opening of the railway to Gladstone on 1 October 1897 had an immediate impact on the development of the Miriam Vale district. With ready access to markets now available via the railway, 90 Miriam Vale blocks were thrown open for selection between 1897 and 1902, and district residents listed in the Post Office Directories jumped from 26 in 1896–97 to 83 in 1900. The Miriam Vale State School was opened on 14 July 1897.

Dairying emerged as an important economic activity on these selections, boosted by the establishment of a butter factory at Gladstone in the early 1900s. In September 1904 the Port Curtis Co-operative Dairy Company Ltd was formed at Gladstone, with the express purpose of establishing a regional butter factory, which opened at Gladstone about March 1906. Located adjacent to the main railway line, it provided an accessible market for cream produced by regional dairy farmers, including those at Miriam Vale.

The Big Fig at Miriam Vale is located close to the Miriam Vale railway station. It is a Ficus benjamina, which is an introduced species to the area, and may have been planted as a Queensland Railways initiative following construction of the North Coast Line through the Miriam Vale district in 1896–1897. In the late 19th and early 20th centuries the Queensland Railways Department promoted ground and garden improvements at its stations, and encouraged the planting of quickly growing, large-canopied trees which would help to keep down dust and provide travellers with shade. Near several of the railway stations along the Bundaberg-Gladstone section of the North Coast Line a single large Ficus benjamina has been planted, suggesting that the tree at Miriam Vale was part of an early Railways Department tree-planting scheme. However, this has not been confirmed, and there are several local stories suggesting that the tree was planted in the early 1900s by differing early residents.

Older Miriam Vale residents can recall the tree as having reached a substantial size by the 1920s and 1930s, such that horses could be tethered underneath it while their owners attended to business at the nearby general store, and children played in its branches. The Big Fig has provided a shady meeting spot for generations of Miriam Vale residents, and since construction of the nearby war memorial in 1921 has provided welcome shade for many Anzac Day commemorations. Farmers and their drays (later trucks) congregated under the tree while waiting for their cream cans to be loaded onto the train to Gladstone. In the 1950s/1960s a Gladstone veterinarian regularly visited Miriam Vale, where he conducted consultations beneath the Big Fig.

The tree maintained its connection with the dairy industry through the mid-20th century, serving as a collection point for dairy farmers bringing cans of cream to be loaded and transported by road to Gladstone when the first motorised truck began carting cream from Miriam Vale to the Port Curtis Dairy Factory in 1952. By this year a ramp, facing Blomfield Street, had been built alongside the trunk of the Big Fig for the loading of cream and later milk cans onto the back of delivery vehicles. The place served as an easily accessible and shady location for farmers to assemble and wait for their produce to be loaded. During the 1960s, the original loading ramp was replaced with a new ramp, and an early fence and gates, reputedly constructed around the tree and cream/milk collection area by Queensland Railways, was demolished. The new ramp was built facing Station Street, and remained until at least 1977 when the last contract for the milk run to Gladstone was cancelled. Several small earth mounds to the north of the trunk of the Fig Tree are all that remain of the second ramp.

The Big Fig is an instantly recognisable landmark in Miriam Vale and its expansive canopy has provided a shady resting place for generations of travellers passing through the town to Agnes Water and the Town of Seventeen Seventy. It has recently been adopted by Miriam Vale Community Development Inc. as its official logo. Plans have already been made by this group for the future conservation of the tree, with a board walk, rest area and interpretive information planned to be constructed beneath the Big Fig.

In January 2015, the Gladstone Regional Council needed to prevent the fig tree's roots from interfering with the road and neighbouring properties as figs have very invasive roots. Having sought the advice of an arborist, the roots will be trimmed back and a barrier inserted to prevent them regrowing in that direction.

== Description ==
The Big Fig (Ficus benjamina) is situated in an unused corner of the Station Street road reserve bounded by a railway fence to the north, a private fence to the east, Blomfield Street to the south and Station Street to the west. Both streets are sealed and a drain has been constructed opposite the trunk of the tree on Station Street.

The site is located in the commercial centre of Miriam Vale, close to the railway station, and adjacent to the War Memorial Park to the west, which lies between the Fig Tree and the Miriam Vale Hotel on the other side of Blomfield Street, opposite the railway station. The Big Fig is easily identified when entering the eastern end of the main street, which tourists travelling through to Agnes Water and the Town of Seventeen Seventy must do. The Big Fig is associated visually with Miriam Vale Shire Council's town beautification scheme along Blomfield Street, in which the reserve on the railway side of the street has been converted into a long, tree-lined park fitted with amenities for local residents and tourists.

The trunk of the Fig Tree is approximately 12 metres (39 ft) in circumference, and the canopy has a span of approximately 30 metres (98 ft) east to west, by 35 metres (115 ft) north to south. The lower branches of the tree near the trunk are very high and thick. The outer limits of the canopy droop down to near ground level on the western, northern and eastern sides. The crown of the canopy is between 10 and 15 metres (33 and 49 ft) high.

There is no grass cover under the canopy to the west and south of the tree, and sparse ground cover near the fence lines of both the railway yard and private property. Leaf litter covers most of the ground surface beneath the canopy. The tree root system protrudes from the trunk and surface roots are evident to the west and south of the trunk.

== Heritage listing ==
Big Fig was listed on the Queensland Heritage Register on 6 January 2004 having satisfied the following criteria.

The place is important in demonstrating the evolution or pattern of Queensland's history.

The Big Fig at Miriam Vale, adjacent to the Miriam Vale Railway Station, is thought to have been planted around the turn of the 19th and 20th centuries. During much of the 20th century it had an important association with the development of dairying in the Miriam Vale district, being associated with the collection of Miriam Vale cream and milk for transport by rail, and later road, to Gladstone for processing.

The place is important because of its aesthetic significance.

The Big Fig has aesthetic qualities which have contributed significantly to the Miriam Vale townscape since at least the 1920s, and which are valued by the Miriam Vale community and visitors alike. The tree is a well-known landmark in the town, and is recognised by, and is familiar to, visitors who pass through Miriam Vale to the coastal holiday towns of Agnes Water and the Town of Seventeen Seventy.

The place has a strong or special association with a particular community or cultural group for social, cultural or spiritual reasons.

The Big Fig is significant as a popular meeting place for generations of Miriam Vale residents, and the current Miriam Vale community holds the historical, social and tourism values of the tree in high esteem.
