= Wakka Wakka language =

Extinct Pama–Nyungan language of Australia

Wakka Wakka
- Waga
- Wakawaka
- Region: Queensland
- Ethnicity: Wakka Wakka, Djakunda, Dalla (?Wulili, ?Baruŋgam)
- Extinct: 1965, with the death of Willie McKenzie
- Language family: Pama–Nyungan: Waka–Kabic; Miyan; Wakka Wakka
- Dialects: Waga-Waga; Duungidjawu; Dala; Djakunda; Wuli-Wuli; ?Barunggam

Language codes
- ISO 639-3: wkw
- Glottolog: waka1274
- AIATSIS: E28
- ELP: Waka-Waka
- Duungidjawu
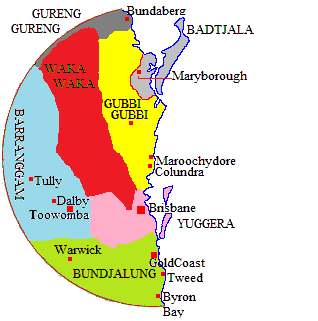
- Map of traditional lands of Aboriginal Australians around Brisbane; Wakka Wakka in red

The Wakka Wakka language, also spelt Waga, or Wakawaka, is an extinct Pama–Nyungan language formerly spoken by the Wakka Wakka people, an Aboriginal Australian nation near Brisbane, Queensland, Australia. Kaiabara/Gayabara, Nguwera/Ngoera, and Buyibara may be varieties or alternative names.

Nils Holmer considered Wakka Wakka to be the most important Waka–Kabic language.

== Initiation language ==
A distinct style of the language was used in male initiation ceremonies. Two phrases or words were given by an unitiated informant with unknown meaning, being biri buːn barung and marugung.

== Dialects ==
The name "Wakka Wakka" is an arbitrary cover term coined by Robert M. W. Dixon for the language with the dialects Duungidjawu, Wuli-Wuli, Djagunda, Dala, Waga-Waga, Barunggam, Nalbo, and Giabal.

== Phonology ==
=== Consonants ===
The Duungidjawu dialect distinguishes four points of articulation, labialvelar, apicoalveolar, laminopalatal, and dorsovelar.

	Peripheral		Apical		Laminal	Glottal
	Labial	Velar	Alveolar	Retroflex	Palatal	Glottal
Plosive	b	ɡ	d		ɟ	(ʔ)
Nasal	m	ŋ	n		ɲ	
Fricative				(ʃ)		(h)
Rhotic			r			
Lateral			l			
Approximant	w			ɻ	j	

/l/ may occasionally be velarized as [ɫ]. It may also exist in the sequence /-lj-/, however; it is never realized as palatal [ʎ]. [ʔ], [ʃ] and [h] occur exclusively in exclamations and interjections.

=== Vowels ===
As with the rest of the Waka-Kabic languages, the Wakka Wakka vowel system contains phonemic /ɛ/ and /ɔ/. Holmer believed these vowels partially originated from a contraction of diphthongs *aj and *aw, and from assimilation from *a. In the eastern Waka-Kabic languages, ai corresponds to Wakka Wakka ɛː or -ɛ. This is rare among the languages of eastern Australia. Vowel length is also contrastive.

	Front	Central	Back
Close	i iː		u uː
Mid	ɛ ɛː		ɔ ɔː
Open		a aː	

=== Phonotactics ===
Duungidjawu syllables take the shape CV(C), where C represents any consonant and V any vowel. Only a single long vowel may occur in a word, and it cannot occur in the third syllable. Duungidjawu words can be composed of a single syllable, unlike other Australian languages, where words must have at least two syllables.

=== Stress ===
In polysyllabic words which have no long vowels, primary stress falls on the first syllable, and secondary stress falls on odd-numbered syllables. Long vowels are always stressed. Where the second vowel is long in a word, the first syllable will bear secondary stress.
