= Wulli Wulli =

Aboriginal Australian people

The Wulli Wulli are an Indigenous Australian people of the state of Queensland.

== Language ==
Wulili is regarded as a dialect of Wakka Wakka. Nils Holmer has analysed what little has been salvaged from the language.

== Country ==
Norman Tindale assigned the Wulili an area of traditional tribal lands of approximately 3,200 square miles (8,300 km^{2}), ranging over the headwaters of the Auburn River and Redbank Creek, northwards as far as Walloon and Camboon, and on the ranges east of the Dawson River. he placed their eastern borders in the vicinity of Eidsvold.

== History ==
Camboon Station was a major employer of people from the Wulli Wulli first nation. State Library of Queensland holds the Camboon Station records which record the day-to-day activities or running the pastoral station including details of the Wulli Wulli peopled employed as drovers and stockmen, shepherds, general station hands and domestic servants.

A very late tradition collected in 1979 states that a certain Jimmy Reid, A Camboon station resident, told a third party before his own death, that the Wulili had participated in the Hornet Bank massacre. In her memoir, the Queensland poet Judith Wright affirmed that, together with the Yiman, who were held responsible for the killings of the Fraser family, the Wulili also were wiped out. John Mathew, however, managed to collect samples of their language from native informants decades later, and published the results in 1926.

== Alternative names ==
- Wilili
- Wililililee
- Willillee
- Wuli-wuli

== Sources ==
- Dixon, R. M. W. (2002). Australian Languages: Their Nature and Development. Cambridge University Press. ISBN 978-0-521-47378-1.
- Holmer, Nils (1983). Linguistic survey of south-eastern Queensland. Research School of Pacific and Asian Studies, Department of Linguistics. ISBN 978-0-858-83295-4.
- Mathew, John (1910). Two representative tribes of Queensland with an inquiry concerning the origin of the Australian race (PDF). London: T. Fisher Unwin.
- Mathew, John (1926). Vocabulary of the Wulili. Vol. 18. Australasian Association for the Advancement of Science. pp. 524–539.
- Reid, Gordon (1982). A Nest of Hornets: The Massacre of the Fraser Family at Hornet Bank Station, Central Queensland, 1857, and Related Events. Oxford University Press. ISBN 978-0-195-54358-2.
- Tindale, Norman Barnett (1974). "Wulili (QLD)". Aboriginal Tribes of Australia: Their Terrain, Environmental Controls, Distribution, Limits, and Proper Names. Australian National University Press.
- Wright, Judith (1999). Clarke, Patricia (ed.). Half a lifetime. Text Publishers. ISBN 978-1-876-48506-1.
