= Tulua language =

Extinct Australian Aboriginal language

Tulua
- Dappil, Narung
- Region: Queensland
- Ethnicity: Dappil, Tulua
- Extinct: by 1973
- Language family: Pama–Nyungan: Waka–Kabic; Than; Tulua

Language codes
- ISO 639-3: None (mis)
- Glottolog: None kabi1260 Kabikabi
- AIATSIS: E41

The Tulua language, also written as Toolooa and Dulua, and known as Narung, is an extinct Aboriginal Australian language of Queensland in Australia. Only two vocabularies have been recorded for it.

== Name ==
Dappil (Dapil) may be another name for the same language; they are treated as such by Terrill (1998). However, the Dappil and Tulua people were possibly the same peoples, and it is not certain what the names referred to. For example, Toolooa and Dappil in Mathew (1913) correspond to Dapil in Kite and Wurm (2004). As of 2020, AIATSIS gives priority to the name "Tulua" for the language.

== History ==
=== Documentation ===
Only two vocabularies were recorded for Tulua. The first vocabulary is one labeled as "Tooloa" or "Dandan", recorded by the Brisbane Commisioner of Police and published in Edward Micklethwaite Curr's The Australian Race. The second is a manuscript by Walter Roth in 1898, naming it "Dappil".

Tulua is one of 20 languages prioritised as part of the Priority Languages Support Project, being undertaken by First Languages Australia and funded by the Department of Communications and the Arts. The project aims to "identify and document critically-endangered languages — those languages for which little or no documentation exists, where no recordings have previously been made, but where there are living speakers".

== Phonology ==
=== Consonants ===
Tulua seems to possess prestopped nasals, as seen in the words didna 'foot' and koodna 'excrement', both of which are commonly found across Australia. A single example of a heterorganic prestopped nasal is attested in koodmary 'shield' (cf. Biri gulmari 'shield').

=== Vowels ===
Vowel length is possibly phonemic in Tulua, as evidenced by spellings of words like karm 'head' and pam 'fish'.
