= Baga National Park =

National park in Queensland, Australia

- IUCN category II (national park)
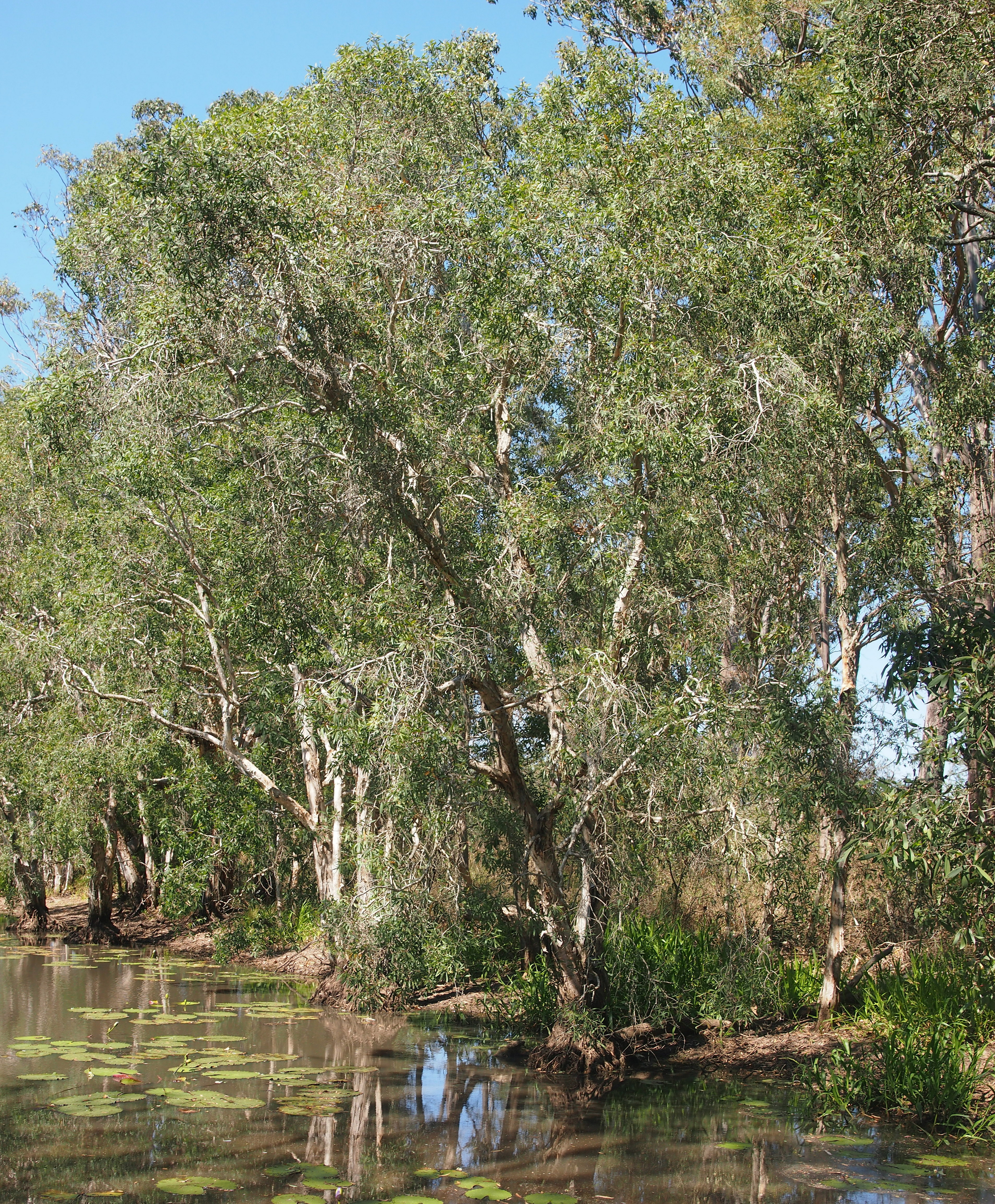
- Billabong fringed by Melaleuca leucadendra

- Location within Queensland
- Location: Queensland
- Nearest city: Rockhampton
- Coordinates: 23°12′53″S 150°37′43″E
- Area: 1.44 km^{2} (0.56 sq mi)
- Established: 1977
- Governing body: Queensland Parks and Wildlife Service

Baga National Park (formerly known as Mount Jim Crow National Park) is a national park in Queensland, Australia, 531 kilometres (330 mi) northwest of Brisbane.

It lies just beside the main road between Rockhampton and Yeppoon. Camping is not permitted in the park and there are no facilities.

The main feature of the park is Baga, a trachyte plug which is a remnant of an extinct volcano.

The Darumbal people have traditionally regarded Baga as a significance place in their Dreamtime stories.

Many species of birds can be found in the park, most notably in Hedlow Creek lagoons, where they come to drink water, such as striated pardalotes, squawking rainbow lorikeets and Lewin's honeyeaters.

== See also ==
- Protected areas of Queensland
