= Ngaygungu language =

Australian Aboriginal language

Ngaygungu
- aka Ngȋ-koong-ō
- Native to: Australia
- Region: Queensland
- Extinct: last attested 1938
- Language family: Pama–Nyungan ?: (unclassified, probably Maric); Ngaygungu

Language codes
- ISO 639-3: None (mis)
- Glottolog: None
- AIATSIS: Y216

Ngaygungu (also known as Ngȋ-koong-ō) is a sleeping, Australian Aboriginal language originally spoken by the Ngaygungyi, for which a wordlist was recorded from Atherton in the Wet Tropics of Queensland by Walter Edmund Roth in October 1898, later also recorded by Norman Barnett Tindale in 1938, but no longer spoken by any living speakers.

== Phonology ==
=== Vowels ===
Ngȋ-koong-ō has the following vowels

ă	ā	ȃ	ĕ	ē	ĭ	ī	ȋ	ŏ	ō	oo

each pronounced as in English were the English vowels a, e, i, o to be marked for length.

=== Consonants ===
Ngȋ-koong-ō has twelve consonants as follows:

b	ch	g	j	k	m	n	ny	ng	r	t	y

each pronounced as they would be in English.

== See also ==
- Ngaygungu people
