= Djakunda =

Indigenous Australian people

The Djakunda are an indigenous Australian people of the state of Queensland.

== Country ==
In Norman Tindale 's estimation, the Djakunda held roughly 2,600 square miles (6,700 km^{2}) of territory between the upper Boyne and Auburn rivers. Their northern limits lay around Hawkwood, which their southern reaches bordered the Great Dividing Range and the area close to Kumbia. Part of their territory was forested with the important ceremonial food source, the bunya pine.

== Language ==
Norman Tindale claimed that the Djakunda language bore resemblances to Mbabaram, and suggested also that their small stature was reminiscent of the hypothetical Barrinean people whose existence he, together with Joseph Birdsell, had posited in the late 1930s.

== Alternative names ==
- Djakanda
- Djaka-nde
- Dakundair

== Sources ==
- Tindale, Norman Barnett (1974). "Djakunda (QLD)". Aboriginal Tribes of Australia: Their Terrain, Environmental Controls, Distribution, Limits, and Proper Names. Australian National University Press. ISBN 978-0-708-10741-6.
