= Barunggam language =

Extinct Australian Aboriginal language

Barunggam
- Muringam
- Region: Queensland
- Ethnicity: Baruŋgam
- Extinct: (date missing)
- Language family: Pama–Nyungan: Waka–Kabic; Miyan; Waga-Waga?; Barunggam

Language codes
- ISO 639-3: None (mis)
- Glottolog: None
- AIATSIS: D40 Barunggam, D56 Muringam
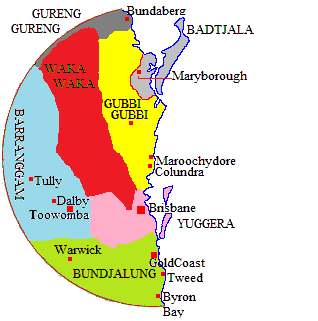
- Traditional lands of Australian Aboriginal peoples around Brisbane (Note: This map is indicative only.)

Barunggam (Murrumningama, Western Wakka Wakka) is an extinct Pama-Nyungan Aboriginal language spoken by the Barunggam people of Queensland in Australia. Barunggam has been classified as a dialect of Wakka Wakka; a speaker reported that much of the two languages was very similar, sharing many forms between themselves. It also shared many words with other neighboring languages, including Jarowair to the east and Mandandanji to the west.

== Etymology ==
The name "Barunggam", according to Nils Holmer, is derived from the word baruŋga 'kangaroo rat; Dalby'; thus, he proposed the designation Dalby language for Barunggam. Alternative names and spellings include Barungam, Parrungoom, Murrumgama, Murrun-gama, Murrumningama, and Kogai.

== Geographical distribution ==
Tindale gives the traditional lands for the Barunggam who spoke the language as:

"Headwaters of Condamine River east of Jackson to about Dalby; north about Charley Creek to Dividing Ranges and west to Wongorgera and Woleebee; south to Tara; at 165 Chinchilla and Jandowae. Their country is on the red soils south and west of the Dividing Range".

== Dialects ==
Some internal variation in Barunggam is attested; for example, the Bunyinni dialect was spoken on Jimbour Station. The name Murrumgama or Murrumningama may also represent a "dialect or regional variation".

== Classification ==
Barunggam was said to be very similar to Wakka Wakka by a speaker of the language. The name "Western Wakka Wakka" has also been applied to Barunggam. Many forms were identical between the two languages. He, however, "evidently was inclined to fall into Wakka-Wakka—the language of prestige in his area—and probably to a certain extent presented the linguistic data in a mixed form". Muringam has been listed either as a synonym or as a related language.

== History ==
By 1983, only one person "was found to be of value for a knowledge of this language".

== Phonology ==
The phonology of Barunggam is, according to Holmer, "fundamentally the same as in Wakka-Wakka".

== Morphology ==
=== Pronouns ===
Personal pronouns in Barunggam and Wakka Wakka are nearly identical.

Barunggam personal pronouns
		NOM	ERG	OBJ	POSS
1	singular	ŋeː (ŋia)	ŋaɟu, ɟu	ŋaɲa	ŋaːri (ŋaːriɲ)
1	dual	ŋam	ŋambu		ŋamgari
2	singular	ɲin (ŋin)	ɲindu (ŋindu)	ɲina	ɲingari (ŋingari)
3	singular	joː (juwa)	jalu	jaŋa	jaːri (juari, joːri)
3	dual	juam			juamgari

Compound pronouns attested include the inclusive ŋam ŋin 'you and me' and exclusive ŋam joː 'he or she and I'.
