= Bundaberg railway station =

Station in Queensland, Australia

Bundaberg
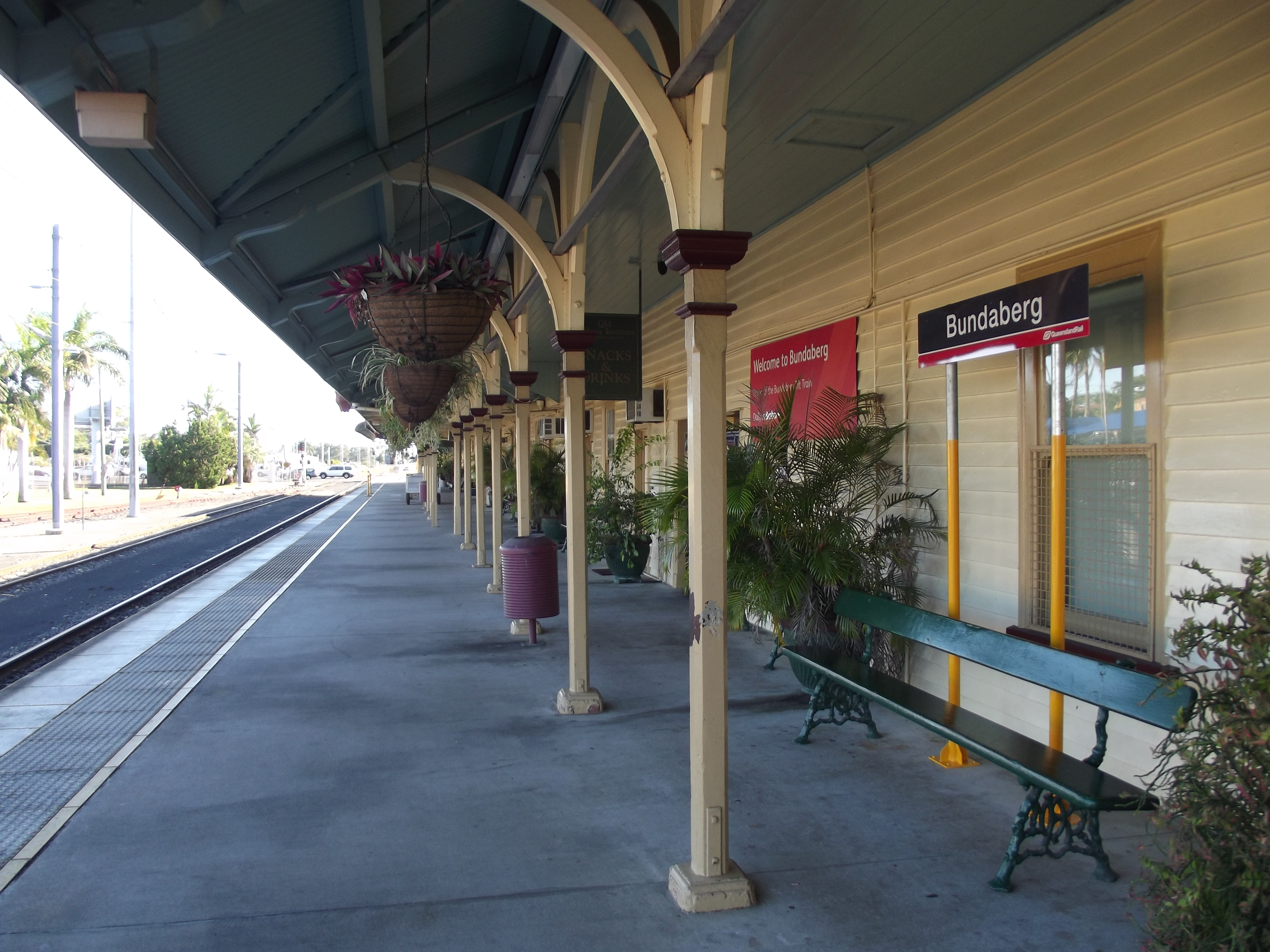
- Northbound view from Platform 1 in July 2012

General information
- Location: McLean Street, Bundaberg Central, Queensland; Australia
- Coordinates: 24°52′05″S 152°20′43″E
- Owner: Queensland Rail
- Operator: Traveltrain
- Line: North Coast
- Distance: 335.98 kilometres from Central
- Platforms: 2 (1 side, 1 bay)
- Tracks: 6

Construction
- Structure type: Ground
- Accessible: Yes

Services
Preceding station	Queensland Rail	Following station
Howard towards Brisbane	Spirit of Queensland	Miriam Vale towards Cairns
Howard towards Brisbane	Tilt Train	Miriam Vale towards Rockhampton
Maryborough West towards Brisbane	Spirit of the Outback	Miriam Vale towards Longreach
Former services
Thabeban towards Brisbane	North Coast line	North Bundaberg towards Cairns
Location

Bundaberg railway station is located on the North Coast line in Queensland, Australia. It serves the city of Bundaberg.

== History ==
Bundaberg's first railway station, on the Mount Perry railway line, was built in 1881 as a transfer station to the Bundaberg docks for shipping coal from nearby mines. It is now in use as a museum. The station has one side platform and a south facing bay platform. A yard exists opposite the station.

== Services ==
Bundaberg is served by long-distance Traveltrain services; the Spirit of Queensland, Spirit of the Outback and Tilt Train.

It was also the terminal point for a Tilt Train service. It was previously served by the Bundaberg Mail.
