= Tulua people =

Aboriginal Australian people

The Tulua people were an Aboriginal Australian people of Queensland, in the southern to central region from the coast to the ranges. The Dappil and Tulua people possibly spoke the same language.

== Language ==
The language of the Tulua people is related to Dappil.

== Country ==
The Tulua's tribal lands ranged over an estimated 1,500 square miles (3,900 km^{2}). They extended from the Calliope River to Port Curtis, near Gladstone. They ran inland from the coast as the nearby ranges and the Boyne Rivers's watershed, and took in also the area around Many Peaks.

The Dappil and Tulua people possibly spoke the same language.

== History of contact ==
When Tulua country was occupied by white settlers in 1854, it was estimated that the Tulua numbered around 700 people. In less than 3 decades (1882) they were reduced to a mere 43 people. One white informant attributed the drastic drop in their demographics to the impact of dropsy.

== Alternative names ==
- Toolooa
- Dandan (an autonym fromdan = man)
- ?Narung

== Sources ==
- E41 Tulua at the Australian Indigenous Languages Database, Australian Institute of Aboriginal and Torres Strait Islander Studies
- Breen, Gavan (2016). "Walter Roth and the Study of Aboriginal Languages in Queensland". In McDougall, Russell; Davidson, Iain (eds.). The Roth Family, Anthropology, and Colonial Administration. Routledge. pp. 133–156. ISBN 978-1-315-41728-8.
- Curr, Edward Micklethwaite (1887). Curr, Edward Micklethwaite (ed.). The Australian race: its origin, languages, customs, place of landing in Australia and the routes by which it spread itself over the continent (PDF). Vol. 3. Melbourne: J. Ferres.
- Mathew, John (1914). "Note on the Gurang Gurang tribe of Queensland, with vocabulary". Proceedings of the Australian Association of Advanced Science. 12. Sydney: 433–443.
- Palmer, Edward (1884). "Notes on Some Australian Tribes". Journal of the Anthropological Institute of Great Britain and Ireland. 13: 276–347. doi:10.2307/2841896. JSTOR 2841896.
- Roth, Walter E. (1897). Ethnological studies among the north-west-central Queensland aborigines (PDF). Brisbane: E. Gregory, Government Printer.
- Tindale, Norman Barnett (1974). "Tulua (QLD)". Aboriginal Tribes of Australia: Their Terrain, Environmental Controls, Distribution, Limits, and Proper Names. Australian National University Press.
