= Taribelang =

Aboriginal Australian people

The Taribelang, also known as Taribelang Bunda, are an Aboriginal Australian people associated with the Bundaberg region of central Queensland.

== Country ==
The Taribelang are associated with an area of approximately 1,800 square miles (4,700 km²) around Bundaberg, extending inland toward Walla, and north to Baffle Creek. Their traditional lands also include parts of the lower reaches of the Burrum River.

Native title processes have formally recognised the Taribelang Bunda people as a distinct group, alongside the Gooreng Gooreng, Gooreng, and Bailai peoples, in connection to Country in the broader region. Taribelang peoples, in conjunction with the aforementioned clans, were granted native title in 2017.

== Alternative names ==
- Tarribelung
- Taribulung
- Taribeleng
- Daribelum
- Daribelum Bunda
- Darpil
- Wokkari
- Wokka
- Yawai (historically recorded; identification uncertain)
- Yawaim
- Ginginburra
- Daribalang
- Goeng
- Koreng Goreng
- Gureng Gureng
- Tulua
- Kabi Kabi
- Dilbai Derwain Bonda / Dhilbye Dharwoin Bunda — historically significant social terminology associated with the Bundaberg/Taribelang context, rather than simply a spelling variant of "Taribelang".

=== Citations ===
- E33 Taribelang at the Australian Indigenous Languages Database, Australian Institute of Aboriginal and Torres Strait Islander Studies
- Howitt, Alfred William (1889). On the organisation of Australian tribes (PDF). Vol. 18. Transactions of the. Royal Society of Victoria. pp. 96–137.
- Howitt, Alfred William (1904). The native tribes of south-east Australia (PDF). Macmillan.
- Mathew, John (1910). Two representative tribes of Queensland with an inquiry concerning the origin of the Australian race (PDF). London: T. Fisher Unwin.
- Mathew, John (1914). "Note on the Gurang Gurang tribe of Queensland, with vocabulary". Proceedings of the Australasian Association for the Advancement of Science. 14. Sydney: 433–443.
- PBC (n.d.). "First Nations Bailai, Gurang, Gooreng Gooreng, Taribelang Bunda People Aboriginal Corporation RNTBC". PBC.
- Tindale, Norman Barnett (1974). "Taribelang (QLD)". Aboriginal Tribes of Australia: Their Terrain, Environmental Controls, Distribution, Limits, and Proper Names. Australian National University.
