= Maric languages =

Extinct Australian Aboriginal language

Maric
- Geographic distribution: Coastal Queensland
- Ethnicity: Murri peoples
- Linguistic classification: Pama–Nyungan: Maric
- Subdivisions: Bidyara; Gunggari; Guwamu/Kooma; Biri/Eastern; Warrungu; Gudjal; Gugu-Badhun; Darumbal/Kingkel?

Language codes
- Glottolog: mari1445 Maric grea1282 Greater Maric
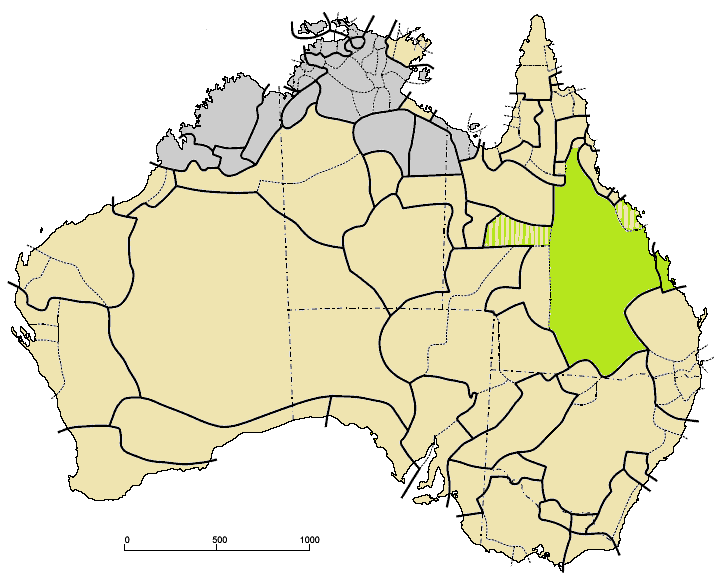
- Maric languages (green) among Pama–Nyungan (tan). The outlined solid area on the coast is Kingkel. The striped areas, which may be Maric, are Ngaro and Giya on the coast and Guwa and Yanda in the interior.

Maric is a branch of the Pama–Nyungan family of Australian languages formerly spoken throughout much of Queensland by many of the Murri peoples. The well attested Maric languages are clearly related; however, the amount of documentation varies between languages, and their classification is uncertain. Colonial invasion and occupation silenced many Maric languages, however some are more recently being reawakened by their respective communities. The clear Maric languages are:

- Maric
  - Gunggari
  - Guwamu/Kooma
  - Bidyara
  - Garaynbal
  - Gangulu
  - Barada
  - Wirdi
  - Biri
  - Warrungu
  - Gugu-Badhun
  - Gudjal
  - (Kingkel?): Darumbal

Dharumbal was added by Bowern, but she says this grouping is tentative. It had been classified in the Kingkel branch of Waka–Kabic. It is not clear if the other Kingkel language, Bayali, is also Maric; Bayali and Darumbal are not close.

== Unclassified languages ==
Ngaro and Giya (Bumbarra), spoken on the coast, may also have been Maric, the latter perhaps a dialect of Biri.

Of the interior, to the west, Breen (2007) writes of "Karna–Mari fringe" languages which are "a discontinuous group of languages, mostly poorly attested, scattered between Karnic and Mari languages but not showing much connection with either or with one another. The only one well attested is also the most remote geographically, Kalkutungu". This includes the Ngura languages, several of which belong to the Karnic branch of Pama–Nyungan (such as the Wilson River dialects spoken by the Galali and Wangkumara, though not the Bulloo River dialects spoken by the same). However, Bowern (2011) lists the Badjiri variety as Maric. Other poorly attested interior languages which may have been Maric include Ngaygungu (Dixon 2002), Bindal (Bowern 2011), Barna (Bowern 2011), Dhungaloo (doubtful in Bowern, not listed at AIATSIS), and Yirandhali (Dixon, Bowern). Yiman was classified by Beale (1975) as Maric, but Breen (2009) disputes this, stating the language is likely Wakka-Kabic. Dixon's "Greater Maric" area listed in Bowern (2011) also includes Guwa (Goa) and Yanda. See also Karnic languages for additional varieties from the area.

== See also ==
- Pama–Maran languages
