= Darumbal language =

Extinct Australian Aboriginal language

Darumbal
- Guwinmal
- Region: Queensland
- Ethnicity: Darumbal, Koinjmal (Guwinmal),
- Extinct: (date missing)
- Revival: revival efforts exist
- Language family: Pama–Nyungan: Maric; Kingkel?; Darumbal
- Dialects: Kuinmabara (Guwinmal); Karunbara; Rakiwara

Language codes
- ISO 639-3: xgm
- Glottolog: dhar1248
- AIATSIS: E46
- ELP: Dharumbal
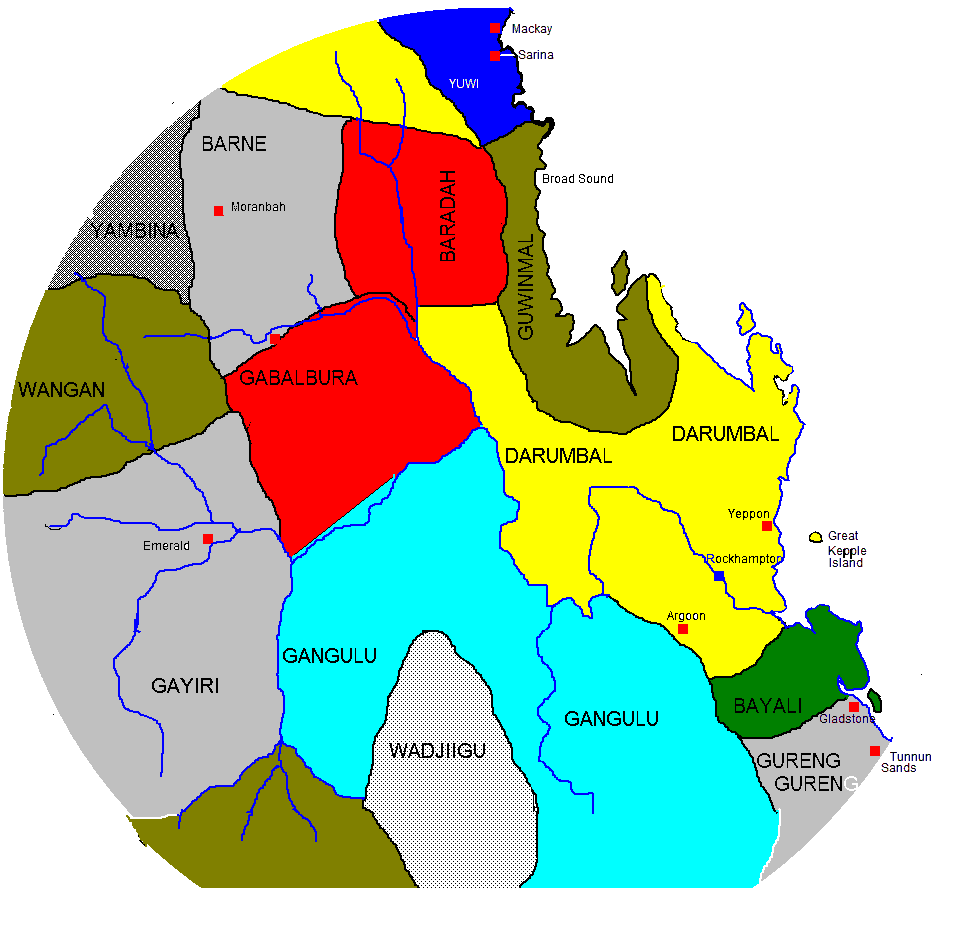
- Traditional lands of Aboriginal people around Mackay, Rockhampton and Gladstone, Queensland; Darumbal in yellow

Darumbal, also spelt Dharambal, is an Australian Aboriginal language of Queensland in Australia declared extinct. It was spoken in the Rockhampton area of Queensland, as well as on the Capricorn Coast, and Yeppoon islands. Dialects were Guwinmal, Karunbara, Rakiwara It is classified with Bayali as a Kingkel language, but the two are not close, with a low 21% shared vocabulary. Indeed, Angela Terrill states that "there is no evidence on which to base a claim of a low-level genetic group including Dharumbal with any other language".

== Name ==
=== Spelling and pronunciation ===
There is some variation in the naming of the language community. Walter Roth spells Ta-rum-bal and Taroombal while Norman Tindale records Dharumbal and cites the alternatives Tarumbul, Tarambol, Tarmbal and Charumbul. Nils Holmer, who undertook the first modern field study of the language uses Darumbal, as does the Darumbal-Noolar Murree Aboriginal Corporation for Land and Culture. However, Holmer also uses ⟨D⟩ to indicate an interdental stop (where others have used ⟨dh⟩), and indeed, he alphabetises Darumbal along with other words beginning with an interdental stop, making his Darumbal equivalent in pronunciation to Dharumbal. From the available material then, Angela Terrill justifiably uses Dharumbal.

== People ==
The Koinmerburra people (Koinjmal, Guwinmal) spoke the Guwinmal dialect, while the Wapabara (Woppaburra) probably spoke their own dialect.

== Phonology ==
=== Consonants ===
Darumbal consonants
		Labial	Laminal	Apical	Dorsal
Stop	voiceless	p	t̪	t	k
Stop	voiced	b	d̪	d	g
Nasal		m	n̪	n	ŋ
Lateral				l	
Rhotic	voiceless trill			r̥	
Rhotic	voiced trill			r	
Rhotic	retroflex			ɻ	
Semivowel		w			j

==== Voicing distinction of stops ====
Dharumbal possesses a rare distinction (among Pama-Nyungan languages) between voiced and voiceless stops, which seems to be maintained intervocalically, but not in other environments, where voicing seems to be in free variation. This observation, posited by Holmer and maintained by Terrill, is supported by the consistency to which older authors transcribed certain words; intervocalically, there is greater consistency in the use of a certain symbol, while in other environments (word-initially, after liquids), there is more variation.

Other Pama-Nyungan languages with a voicing distinction of stops include Thangatti, Marrgany-Gunya, Wangkumara, and Diyari.

==== Laminals ====
Laminal consonants are often realised interdentally, but may also be realised palatally in any position, except for the laminal nasal, which must be realised palatally in word-final position.

==== Laterals ====
Lateral consonants may not appear word-initially.

==== Rhotics ====
From the existing material, Terrill concludes that there were likely three phonemically distinct rhotic consonants: a retroflex continuant, and two trills, distinguished by voicing. The two trills only appear intervocalically and never word-initially. The (near) minimal pairs given by Stephen Wurm are:

- wuru "son"
- wurhu "nose"
- gurru "fly"

Additional minimal pairs were observed by Holmer.

=== Vowels ===
	Front	Central	Back
Close	i		u
Open		a	

Darumbal has three phonemic vowels. Terrill finds no evidence for contrastive vowel length. Roth used various diacritics in his transcriptions, but no explanation for their function was provided.

== Sources ==
- Crump, Des (14 September 2020). "Language of the Week: Week Sixteen - Wapabara". State Library of Queensland.
- Dixon, R. M. W. (2002). Australian Languages: Their Nature and Development. Cambridge University Press. Archived from the original on 25 May 2006.
- Holmer, Nils (1983). "Darumbal". Linguistic survey of south-east Queensland. Pacific Linguistics. Pacific Linguistics. pp. 456–485.
- Terrill, Angela (2002). Dharumbal: the language of Rockhampton, Australia (PDF). Pacific Linguistics 525. Pacific Linguistics. p. 108. Archived (PDF) from the original on 19 December 2024.
