= Darumbal =

Aboriginal Australian people

The Darumbal people, also spelt Darambal and Dharumbal, are the Aboriginal Australian people who have traditionally occupied Central Queensland, speaking dialects of the Darumbal language. and the terms are sometimes used interchangeably.

== Country ==
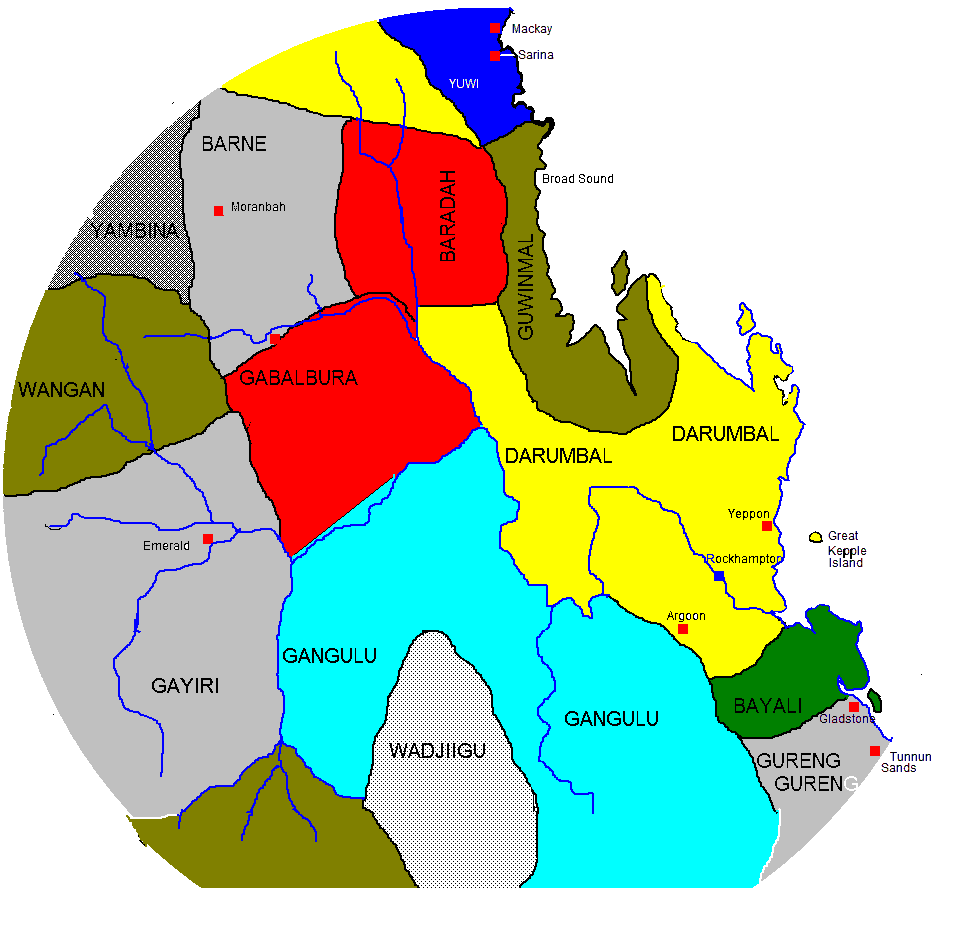
Traditional lands of Aboriginal people around Mackay, Rockhampton and Gladstone, Queensland

Traditional Darumbal land is considered to encompass an estimated 4,000 square miles (10,000 km^{2}) around most of coastal Central Queensland, running from Arthur Point at Shoalwater Bay to Yeppoon, and taking in the mouth of Fitzroy River and Keppel Bay Islands. From Keppel Bay they extended inland to Boomer Range, and Marlborough, Yaamba, Rockhampton, and Gracemere.

== History ==
With the arrival of European settlers in the region, some Darumbal people were tolerated as part of fringe communities of the new settlements, but most were systematically killed to make way for pastoral development. According to some estimates, "between 1865 and 1902 the population of the Keppel Islands suffered a substantial reduction of 75 to 80 per cent". In one incident in July 1865, native troopers ambushed a Darumbal ceremonial gathering outside Rockhampton, near Samuel Birkbeck's Glenmore Station and shot dead 18 Aboriginal people, after nearby settlers expressed worries about the presence of natives in their area. After the massacre, they set fire to the corpses.

== Language ==
Ethnologue classifies the Darumbal language as "extinct". Technically, Bayali was quite distinct from Darumbal, sharing, according to Dixon's analysis, no more than 21% of its basic word stock with Darumbal.

Gudamulli is a Darumbal greeting, meaning 'hello'.

Some Darumbal words live on in place names in Central Queensland. The town of Coowonga is named after a Darumbal man famous for saving the life of politician King O'Malley in the late 19th century. The Rockhampton suburb of Nerimbera is named for a Darumbal word meaning 'where the mountains meet the river'.

== Society ==
According to ethnologist Norman Tindale, the Darumbal comprised some 13 groups or band societies, though one of these was described as belonging to the Ningebal people. One extinct branch of the group, the Warabal, may have dwelt around the foot of the Boomer Range.

== Native title ==
Darumbal native title claims and land use issues were lodged in the 21st century. In 2001, a claim was made to the National Native Title Tribunal, and in 2007, 137 ha (340 acres) at Mount Wheeler were handed over to the Darumbal people. Darumbal people have been granted limited access to the Shoalwater Bay Military Training Area.

There have been several controversies regarding fisheries licensing and conservation.

Native title of the land was granted in 2016, and in May 2022 the Darumbal people were officially recognised as the traditional custodians of an expanse of ocean covering 36,606 km^{2} (14,134 sq mi) off the Central Queensland Coast, making it the largest Traditional Use of Marine Resources Agreement (TUMRA) on the Great Barrier Reef. The occasion was marked by a ceremony on the beach at Emu Park.

Recognised Ancestral Groups

Under the Darumbal Nation Native Title Claim, descendants of the following family groups are recognised:

Kitty Mulway and Pompey of Stannage; Yorky – [Sunflower/Meredith]

Kate Reid and James Hector – [Garret/Hector]

Jack Naylor (Jnr); Brothers John McPherson and Harry Bauman – [Hatfield/McPherson/Naylor/Bauman (Bowman)]

Clara Wallace – [Mann/Wallace/Williams/Hector/Edmunds]

Clara McKenzie – [Rutherford/Hayden]

Maggie (Mitchell); Mary Jones; Maria McKenzie; Mundabel – [Ross/Landers/Roma/Adams/Wylie/Fitzgerald]

== Sources ==
- Bauman, Berylanne (17 October 2011). "Call to stop hunting dugong". Sunshine Coast Daily.
- "'Bayali'". Ethnologue.
- Conway-Dodd, Zhanae (18 December 2015). "Rocky students to learn Darumbal language at school". The Morning Bulletin.
- "CQU hosts successful Darumbal sites tour". Central Queensland University. 25 May 2006.
- "Deadline Approaches on Darumbal Native Title Claim". National Native Title Tribunal. Archived from the original on 27 February 2012.
- "Elder Adoption Ceremony". Coowonga State School. Queensland Government. Archived from the original on 18 February 2014.
- Evans, Raymond (2012). ""Plenty Shoot 'Em": The Destruction of Aboriginal Societies along the Queensland Frontier". In Moses, A. Dirk (ed.). Genocide and Settler Society: Frontier Violence and Stolen Indigenous Children in Australian History. Berghahn Books. pp. 150–173. ISBN 978-1-571-81411-1.
- Flowers, W. H. (1956). "Habits, customs and relationships of the Australian Aboriginals". Journal of the Royal Historical Society of Queensland. 5 (4): 1254–1262.
- "Gumoo Woojabuddee Section Fact Sheets" (PDF). Great Barrier Reef Marine Park Authority.
- Hines, Jasmine; Semmler, Erin (7 May 2022). "Darumbal Aboriginal people celebrate historic sea country agreement on Great Barrier Reef". ABC News.
- "Indigenous Control of Indigenous Heritage". Australian Department of the Environment and Heritage.
- Kiernan, Ben (2007). Blood and Soil: A World History of Genocide and Extermination from Sparta to Darfur. Yale University Press. p. 307. ISBN 978-0-300-10098-3 – via Internet Archive.
- "Mt Wheeler handed over to traditional Darumbal owners in historic ceremony". Queensland Cabinet Office.
- "Nerimbera Football Club".
- Roth, Walter E. (15 November 1910). "North Queensland Ethnography: Social and individual nomenclature" (PDF). Records of the Australian Museum. 8 (1): 79–106. doi:10.3853/j.0067-1975.8.1910.936. Archived from the original (PDF) on 12 November 2014.
- Rowland, Michael (2004). "Myths and non-myths: Frontier 'massacres' in Australian history — the Woppaburra of the Keppel Islands". Journal of Australian Studies. 28 (81): 1–16. doi:10.1080/14443050409387934. S2CID 143534888.
- Terrill, Angela (2002). Dharumbal: the language of Rockhampton. Research School of Pacific and Asian Studies. ISBN 978-0-858-83462-0.
- Tindale, Norman Barnett (1974). "Darambal (QLD)". Aboriginal Tribes of Australia: Their Terrain, Environmental Controls, Distribution, Limits, and Proper Names. Australian National University Press. ISBN 978-0-708-10741-6. Archived from the original on 6 March 2017.
- "Title case opens in national park" (PDF). AIATSIS. March 2005. Archived from the original (PDF) on 24 April 2015.
- Wratten, Adam (12 February 2010). "Darumbal Man Appeals $2000 fine". The Morning Bulletin.
- Wratten, Adam (16 September 2011). "Hunter Rejects Dugong Ban Call". The Morning Bulletin.
