= Miriam Vale railway station =

Railway station in Queensland, Australia

Miriam Vale
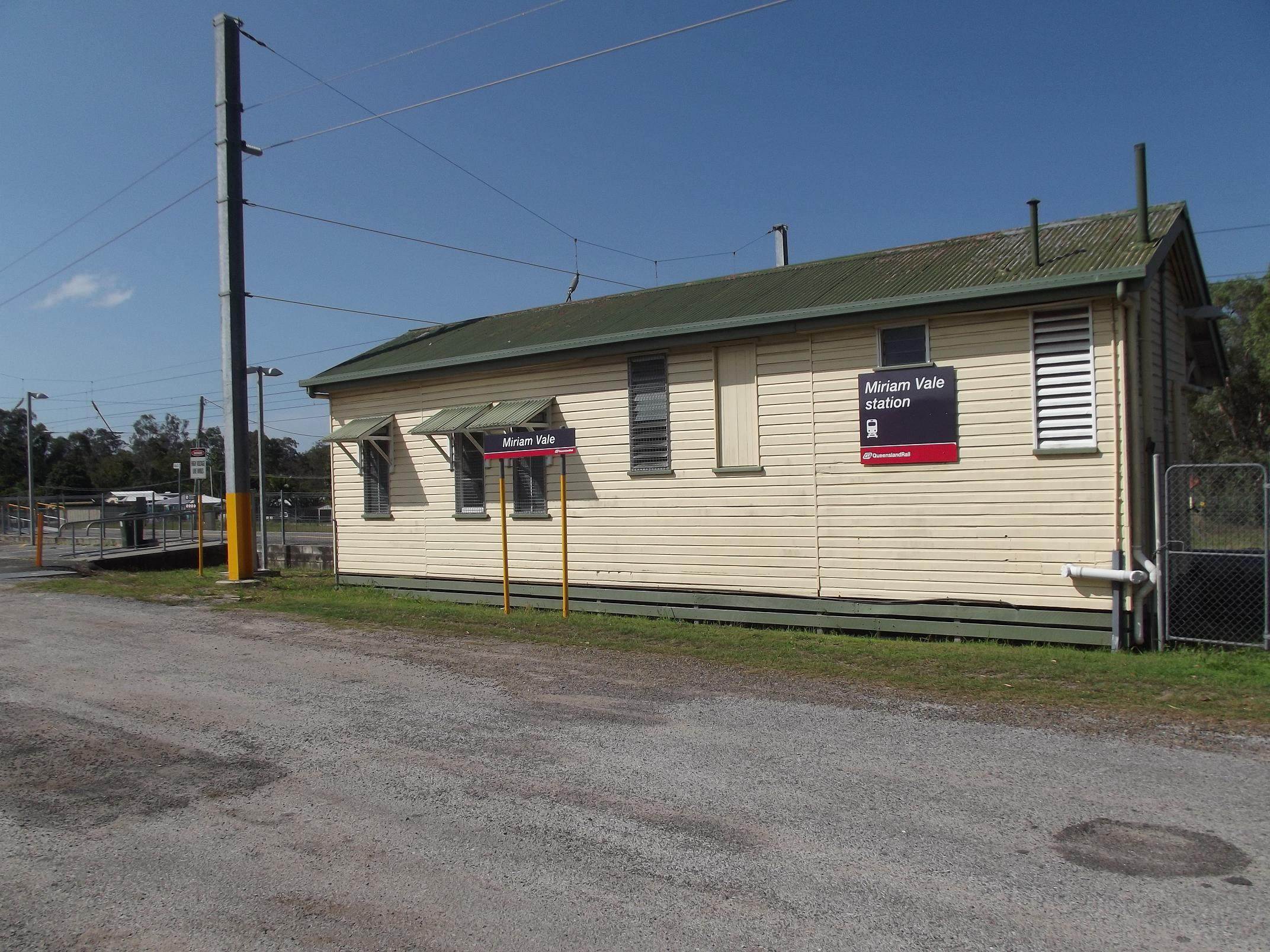
- Station in November 2012

General information
- Location: between Chapman & Bloomfield Streets, Miriam Vale; Australia
- Coordinates: 24°19′44″S 151°33′48″E
- Owner: Queensland Rail
- Operator: Traveltrain
- Line: North Coast
- Platforms: 1
- Tracks: 3

Construction
- Structure type: Ground
- Accessible: Yes

Services
Preceding station	Queensland Rail	Following station
Bundaberg towards Brisbane	Spirit of Queensland	Gladstone towards Cairns
Bundaberg towards Brisbane	Tilt Train	Gladstone towards Rockhampton
Bundaberg towards Brisbane	Spirit of the Outback	Gladstone towards Longreach
Location

Miriam Vale railway station is located on the North Coast line in Queensland, Australia. It serves the town of Miriam Vale. It features a single platform with a wooden structure. Opposite lies a passing loop and disused siding.

== Services ==
Miriam Vale is served by long-distance Traveltrain services; The Spirit of Queensland as a scheduled stop. The Spirit of the Outback and Rockhamption Tilt Train stops here only if reservations has been pre-booked.
