= Taribelang language =

Extinct Australian Aboriginal language

Bunda
- Gureng-Gureng, Taribelang
- Native to: Australia
- Region: Queensland
- Ethnicity: Bunda, ?Taribelang
- Extinct: by 1975
- Revival: <100 L2 or L3 speakers
- Language family: Pama–Nyungan: Waka–Kabic; Than; Bunda
- Dialects: Gureng-Gureng; Guweng-Guweng

Language codes
- ISO 639-3: gnr
- Glottolog: gure1255
- AIATSIS: E32 Gureng-Gureng, E36 Goeng-Goeng, E33 Taribelang
- ELP: Gureng Gureng
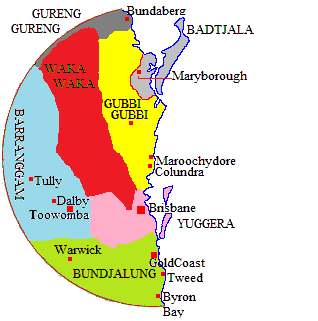
- Traditional lands of Australian Aboriginal people around Brisbane, including Gureng Gureng

Taribelang, also known as Bunda and Gureng-Gureng, is a language of Queensland. Although no longer spoken as a native language by the Taribelang or Bunda people, it is spoken as a 2nd or 3rd language by under 100. There exists some confusion between Austlang's (AIATSIS) E33: Taribelang and E36: Goeng Goeng languages.

== Language revival ==
Since 2017, the Central Queensland Language Centre has been working on helping to restore three languages from the region – Yiiman, Byelle (Biyali) and Taribelang. As of 2020, Taribelang is one of 20 languages prioritised as part of the Priority Languages Support Project, being undertaken by First Languages Australia and funded by the Department of Communications and the Arts. The project aims to "identify and document critically-endangered languages — those languages for which little or no documentation exists, where no recordings have previously been made, but where there are living speakers".

== Phonology ==
=== Consonants ===
	Peripheral		Laminal	Apical
	Labial	Velar	Palatal	Alveolar
Plosive	b	ɡ	ɟ	d
Nasal	m	ŋ	ɲ	n
Rhotic				r
Lateral				l
Approximant	w		j	

=== Vowels ===
	Front	Central	Back
Close	i iː		u uː
Mid	e eː		
Open		a aː	

== Accent ==
Today some speakers have a "heavier" more guttural way of speaking, e.g. rolling the tongue when pronouncing the "rr's", starting words with Ng rather than a single N and also heavier speakers sound out a "dj" sound rather than "ch" or "t". "Heavier" speakers tend to be the more western groups from along the Burnett River of Queensland.

The more coastal families today seem to have a "lighter" way of speaking (less guttural & not rolling the tongue and using the single N at the start of words rather than the Ng & using "ch" & "t" rather than "dj" etc.) which is most likely the result of the influence of the English language in recent times.
