= Bayali language =

Extinct Australian Aboriginal language

Bayali
- Orambul
- Native to: Australia
- Region: Queensland
- Extinct: (date missing)
- Revival: 2017
- Language family: Pama–Nyungan: Maric? Kingkel?; Bayali

Language codes
- ISO 639-3: bjy
- Glottolog: baya1257
- AIATSIS: E42
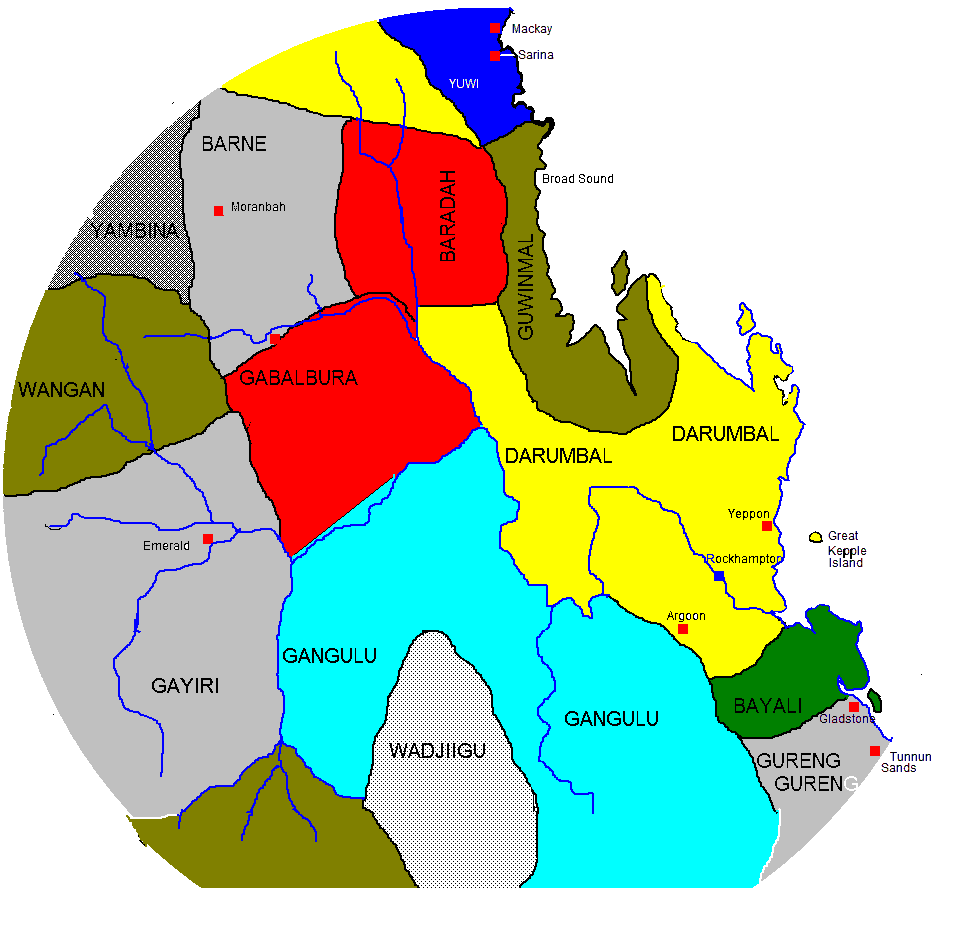
- Traditional lands of Aboriginal people around Mackay, Rockhampton and Gladstone Queensland, Bayali in green.

Bayali (also spelt Biyali, Baiali, Byelle, Byellee, and also known as Orambul or Urambal) is an Australian Aboriginal language of Queensland in Australia, formerly spoken in the Rockhampton and Gladstone areas. It is considered extinct, but a project is under way to revive the language. Only a single vocabulary was collected of Bayali.

== Classification ==
Bayali belongs to the Pama–Nyungan language family. It has been classified together with Darumbal as a Kingkel language, but the two are not close, and Bowern (2011) reclassified Darumbal as a Maric language. Only 21% of Bayali vocabulary is shared with Darumbal.

== Geographical distribution ==
Bayali was originally spoken south of Darumbal. Its distribution was placed by Curr from Keppel Bay to the Calliope River.

== History ==
By 1882, only 32 Bayali people survived.

=== Documentation ===
The only documentation of Bayali is a single word list published by Edward Micklethwaite Curr in his book The Australian Race.

== Language revival ==
Since 2017, the Central Queensland Language Centre has been working on helping to restore three languages from the region – Yiiman, Byelle and Taribelang (also known as Gureng Gureng). As of 2020, Bayali (spelt Bayelle) is one of 20 languages prioritised as part of the Priority Languages Support Project, being undertaken by First Languages Australia and funded by the Department of Communications and the Arts. The project aims to "identify and document critically-endangered languages — those languages for which little or no documentation exists, where no recordings have previously been made, but where there are living speakers".

== Vocabulary ==
Some words from the Bayali language, as spelt and written by Bayali authors include:

- Girra: fire
- Gula: koala
- Guruman: kangaroo
- Kobbera: head
