= Djungan =

Aboriginal Australian people

Coordinates: 17°5′S 144°50′E

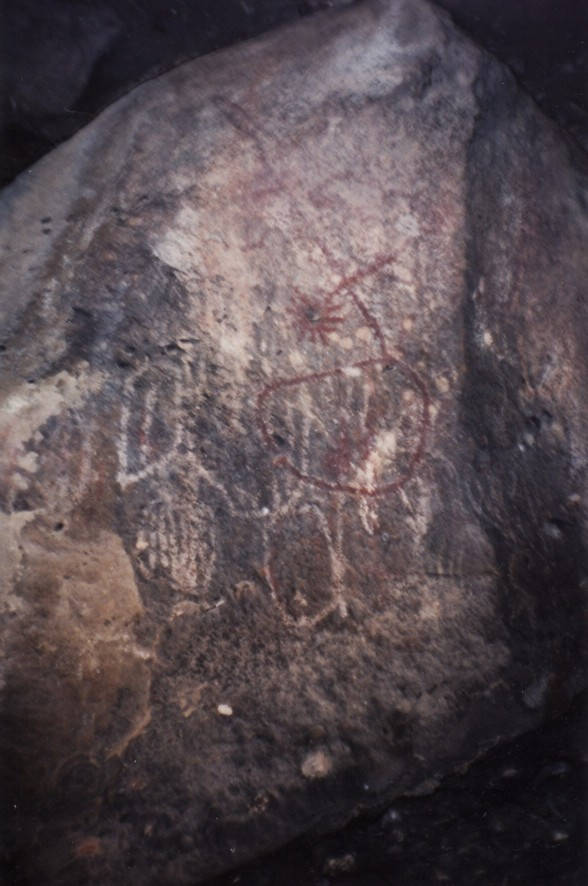
- Rock art painting at Ngarrabullgan

Regions with significant populations
- Queensland, Australia

Languages
- Djungan, English

Related ethnic groups
- Kuku Yalanji, Muluridji

Djungan, also known as the Djankun, are an Aboriginal Australian people of Far North Queensland.

== Ethnonymy ==
Colonial administrators, early settlers, ethnologists, and linguists recorded the Djungan under a variety of orthographies and regional designations. In late 19th and early 20th century accounts, varieties of the Djungan name was commonly recorded with the regional suffixes -bari, -barra, or -berry, meaning "people of" or "associated with". In 1897, Police Commissioner W. E. Parry-Okeden documented them as Changunberries, followed in 1898 by ethnologist R. H. Mathews, who recorded them as Shanganburra. In 1926, Francis Richards published his account of Djungan customs and vocabulary using the spelling Chunkunberry.

In mid-20th-century anthropological surveys, Ursula McConnel recorded them in 1939-1940 as Koko-Tjungan, using the northern Kuku Yalanji exonym (where kuku means "speech").. Lauriston Sharp (1939) identified the Djungan as Tjankun,; and Norman Tindale (1940, 1974) recorded them as Djankən.

From the 1970s onward, professional linguists and national reference surveys use the following variatons:

- In 1972, Stephen Wurm recorded Djangun, and later, in 1994, listed them as Djagun.
- In 1972, R. M. W. Dixon recorded Dyangun, later adopting Djangun and in 2002 classifying the speech as (Kuku-)Djangun.
- In 1975, Lynette Oates catalogued the group as Djunggun.
- In 1981, Michael Walsh listed Djagun.
- In 2023, Claire Bowern documented the Djungan as speaking Gugu-Djangun.

The Australian Institute of Aboriginal and Torres Strait Islander Studies (AIATSIS) standardizes the primary heading as Kuku Djangun / Djungan (with the language code Y109), while contemporary traditional owner organizations and legal determinations formally use Djungan.

=== Alternative names ===
- Changunberries
- Chunkunberry
- Chunkunburra
- Chungki
- Djagun
- Djangun
- Djandnandi
- Djankən
- Djankun
- DjungguN
- Djungan
- Dyangun
- Dyangunbari
- Gugu-Djangun
- Jungkurara
- Kokojelandji
- Kokokulunggur
- Kokomutju (northern tribal exonym)
- Kokotjangun (Kuku Yalanji exonym)
- Kokowalandja
- Kuku
- Kuku Djangun
- Kuku Jangkun
- Kuku Yalanji
- Muluridji
- Mutju
- Ngaikungu
- Ngaikungo
- Ngaikungo i
- Shanganburra
- Wakara
- Wulpura

== Country ==
The traditional country of the Djungan encompasses the granite ranges and savannah woodlands roughly from west of Mount Carbine to Chillagoe in Far North Queensland, with the Djungan culturally identified as "Dry Country people".

According to anthropologist Norman Tindale, the Djankun held an estimated 1,300 square miles (3,400 km^{2}) of tribal territory centered in this region. Their country included Mount Mulligan and Thornborough, with western boundaries extending to around Mungana and eastern limits including Dimbulah near the headwaters of the Walsh River.

== Mythology ==
Panoramic view of Ngarrabullgan (Mount Mulligan), the sacred tabletop mountain associated with the spirit entity Eekoo

Djungan traditions and creation narratives are centered on Ngarrabullgan (aka Mount Mulligan), its waterways and Lake Koogarro (aka Lake Koongirra). The landscape was shaped by ancestral beings, notably the totemic birds Mirki (the night owl or mopoke) and Raku. According to accounts recorded by Lauriston Sharp, bushfires once surrounded Mirki, who escaped by transforming into a bird; this prompted other ancestral beings to assume animal forms, bringing the mythical creation era to a close.

In Djungan creation Stories, Ngarrabullgan originally arose as a mound of stones built by ancestral wallabies under the direction of an eaglehawk. After the spirit Eekoo killed the nestlings of a swamp pheasant, birds ignited a vast bushfire in retaliation, melting and fusing the stones into the sheer sandstone cliffs of the mountain; Eekoo escaped and survived by creating Lake Koogarro atop the Ngarrabullgan plateau as a sanctuary.

In Djungan lore, in addition to ancestral creative beings, there are four primary spiritual entities: the ubiquitous Beerroo; the malevolent mountain spirit Eekoo; and two aquatic spirits inhabiting deep waterholes, Mooramully and Barmboo. Most illnesses were attributed to Beerroo or Eekoo, who were believed to project invisible stones, wood, or hooks into the body. While ordinary people feared approaching the waters of Lake Koogarro, the rhoonyoo (traditional doctor) was considered a companion of Eekoo and could enter safely. In the lowlands, Mooramully and Barmboo were held responsible for drownings and sudden illness following swimming. The voice of Barmboo was recognized in the booming of water ripples against banks and his presence in the rainbow, which was believed fatal to ordinary people if it shone on them, while Mooramully acted as a guardian and source of esoteric knowledge for the rhoonyoo.

Because Eekoo resided on the mountain plateau, the Djungan traditionally avoided camping on its summit. Following the Mount Mulligan mine disaster of 19 September 1921, which claimed the lives of 75 underground coal miners, Djungan tradition viewed the disaster as spiritual retribution by Eekoo for mining and desecrating the sacred mountain.

== Prehistory ==
On 12 May 2011, Ngarrabullgan was formally included on the Australian National Heritage List for its deep archaeological antiquity and ongoing cultural significance to the Djungan.

Rock shelter excavations on the mountain have yielded cultural sequences extending beyond 37,000 years, establishing it as one of the oldest directly dated occupation complexes in Queensland. Excavations on the summit plateau revealed that while surrounding valley lowlands remained inhabited, Aboriginal groups abruptly ceased camping on top of the mountain approximately 600 years ago. This occupation hiatus occurred without signs of climatic deterioration or regional abandonment, providing a rare archaeological parallel dating the emergence of surviving Djungan oral traditions and beliefs telling of Eeekoo's presence on the Ngarrabullgun plateau.

Archaeological surveys of Ngarrabullgan have formally recorded 20 rock art shelters across the mountain. While most of the rock art consists of abstract patterns, human-like figures are shown upright, slanted, lying down, or upside-down. More than half (56%) of the paintings use only red pigment, while two-colour designs pair red, white, brown, or yellow, alongside hand stencils and prints.

Historical records document the continuity of the ancestral Djungan community in their traditional country through early European contact in the 1870s. In native title legal proceedings, the Federal Court noted that ancestral Djungan spoke a dialect related to the Kuku Yalanji language and maintained their connection through traditional laws, customs, dreaming stories, and sacred sites.

== History ==
Non-Aboriginal incursions into Djungan country really started following exploration of the Hodgkinson Basin by James Venture Mulligan. Mulligan's discovery of gold along the Hodgkinson River in 1876 triggered a gold rush that drew thousands of prospectors from the Palmer River goldfields, leading to the immediate proclamation of the Hodgkinson Minerals Area that same year.

The sudden influx of pastoralists and miners led to widespread conflict and violent dispersal across Djungan country. Traditional owners recounted that ancestral Djungan were hunted, shot, and forcibly driven away from the goldfields if they resisted encroachment. Decades of state-enforced removals followed, scattering many Djungan families into surrounding settlements and missions.

In the late 20th century, Djungan families began returning to their traditional lands to reassert custodianship. Elders Ron and Jimmy Archer, for instance, relocated their families back to Wungu on Djungan country, establishing cultural workshops and initiating political and legal campaigns for the recognition of their ancestral estate.

== Native Title and Land tenure ==
In 1992, the Kuku Djungan Aboriginal Corporation purchased the pastoral lease over Kondaparinga Station within Djungan country, encompassing Ngarrabullan (aka Mount Mulligan).

On 2 August 2012, Justice Logan of the Federal Court of Australia delivered a consent determination under the Native Title Act 1993 recognising the Djungan as traditional owners of claimed parts of Djungan country. The decision resolved four native title applications covering land in and around Dimbulah, Mount Mulligan, Thornborough, and Kingsborough.

The determination recognised both exclusive and non-exclusive native title rights across the claim areas, including exclusive possession over approximately 148,000 hectares in the Mount Mulligan locality comprising Kondaparinga Station, made possible by an agreement between the Djungan claim group and the Kuku Djungan Aboriginal Corporation.

The prescribed body corporate appointed to manage these native title rights and interests is the Nguddaboolgan Native Title Aboriginal Corporation.

In April 2015, Djungan traditional owners celebrated a good outcome to a campaign to protect Ngarrabullgan after explorer Mantle Mining relinquished its coal seam gas exploration permit over the mountain and surrounding area following Djungan traditional owner and community opposition over potential impacts to the Djungan sacred site.

Under the management of the Nguddaboolgan Native Title Aboriginal Corporation, traditional owners administer environmental and cultural conservation through a Djungan Rangers program, established in December 2023 under the Queensland Indigenous Land and Sea Ranger Program the rangers carry out feral animal and weed eradication, cultural heritage monitoring, fire management and more.

== Sources ==
- "Kuku Djangun / Djungan (Y109)". Australian Institute of Aboriginal and Torres Strait Islander Studies.
- Archer on behalf of the Djungan People #1 v State of Queensland, [2012 FCA 801] (FCA 2 August 2012).
- Bird, Michael I.; Ayliffe, Linda K.; Fifield, L. Keith; Turney, Chris S. M.; Cresswell, Richard G.; Barrows, Timothy T.; David, Bruno (1999). "Radiocarbon dating of 'old' charcoal using a wet oxidation, stepped-combustion procedure". Radiocarbon. 41 (2): 127–140. doi:10.1017/S0033822200019448.
- David, Bruno (1998). "Introduction: 'a mountain once seen never to be forgotten'". Ngarrabullgan: Geographical Investigations in Djungan Country, Cape York Peninsula. Monash Publications in Geography and Environmental Science 51. Melbourne: Monash University. pp. 1–26.
- Davidson, R. R. (1886). "Granite Range at the Head of the Walsh River". In Curr, Edward Micklethwaite (ed.). The Australian race: its origin, languages, customs, place of landing in Australia and the routes by which it spread itself over the continent (PDF). Vol. 2. Melbourne: J. Ferres. pp. 414–415.
- Dixon, R. M. W.; Koch, Grace (1996). Dyirbal Song Poetry: The Oral Literature of an Australian Rainforest People. St Lucia: University of Queensland Press. ISBN 978-0-7022-2615-1.
- Falvo, Andrea (23 April 2015). "Win for traditional owners as coal seam gas permit for Mt Mulligan revoked". The Cairns Post.
- Ingram, Sharmaine (21 October 2012). "Djungan Country". Living Black. NITV.
- "Kuku Djungan people abandon sacred mountain Ngarrabullgan". Deep Time. ABC News. 2024.
- "Kuku Djungan (Series Identifier: SAMA 1217/6)". Suzette Coates Collection. South Australian Museum. 2026.
- Mathews, R. H. (1898). "Divisions of Australian Tribes". Proceedings of the American Philosophical Society. 37 (157): 151–154. JSTOR 983703.
- McConnel, Ursula (1939–1940). "Social organization of the tribes of Cape York Peninsula, North Queensland". Oceania. 10 (1, 4): 54–72, 434–455. doi:10.1002/j.1834-4461.1939.tb00256.x.
- Mowbray, H.M. (1886). "Granite Range, close to the Head of the Mitchell River and east of the Hodgkinson Goldfields". In Curr, Edward Micklethwaite (ed.). The Australian race: its origin, languages, customs, place of landing in Australia and the routes by which it spread itself over the continent (PDF). Vol. 2. Melbourne: J. Ferres. pp. 402–407.
- Mulligan, James Venture (1875). Journal.
- "Ngarrabullgan". National Heritage Places. Department of Climate Change, Energy, the Environment and Water. 12 May 2011.
- Nguddaboolgan Native Title Aboriginal Corporation. "Nguddaboolgan Native Title Aboriginal Corporation RNTBC".
- Nguddaboolgan Native Title Aboriginal Corporation. "Ngarrabullgan: 230 Million Years In the Making". Ngarrabullgan National Heritage Place.
- Parry-Okeden, W. E. (1897). Report on the North Queensland Aborigines and the Native Police (Report). Brisbane: Queensland Government Printer.
- Richards, Francis (1926). "Customs and language of the Western Hodgkinson aboriginals". Memoirs of the Queensland Museum. 8 (3): 249–265.
- Robertson, Joshua (22 April 2015). "Indigenous heritage site safe after miner drops plans to drill for gas". The Guardian.
- Sharp, R. Lauriston (1939). "Tribes and totemism in north-east Australia". Oceania. 9 (4): 254–275, 439–461. doi:10.1002/j.1834-4461.1939.tb00248.x.
- Tindale, Norman Barnett (1974). "Djankun (QLD)". Aboriginal Tribes of Australia: Their Terrain, Environmental Controls, Distribution, Limits, and Proper Names. Australian National University Press. Archived from the original on 28 April 2013.
