= Guugu Yalandji language =

Australian Aboriginal language

Guugu Yalandji
- Region: Queensland
- Ethnicity: Kuku Yalanji, Yungkurara, Kuku Nyungkal, Kokobididji, Kokobujundji, Kokokulunggur, Kokowalandja, Wakara, Wakaman, (Note: Not to be confused with the language of the Wakaman people, Wagaman, probably a variant of the mutually intelligible Agwamin and Wamin languages, Wakaman a dialect of Kuku Yalanji. See also Wagaman language (disambiguation).) Djankun, Muluridji, ?Wulpura
- Native speakers: 388 (2021 census)
- Language family: Pama–Nyungan: Paman?; Yalanjic or Yimidhirr–Yalanji–Yidinic; Guugu Yalandji
- Dialects: Kuku-Yalanji; Kuku-Njungkul; Kuku-Bididji; Kuku-Dungay; Kuku-Buyundji; Kuku-Kulunggur; Kuku-Yalaja (Kuku-Yelandji); Koko-Walandja; (Kuku-)Wakura; (Kuku-)Wakaman; (Kuku-)Djangun; (Kuku-)Muluridji; Kuku-Jakandji
- Writing system: Latin

Language codes
- ISO 639-3: Variously: gvn – Kuku-Yalanji djf – Djangun vmu – Muluridyi
- Glottolog: yala1261
- AIATSIS: Y78
- ELP: Kuku-Yalanji
- Djangun
- Muluridyi
- Kuku Yalanji is classified as Severely Endangered by the UNESCO Atlas of the World's Languages in Danger.

Guugu Yalandji, also spelt Kuku-Yalanji, is an Australian Aboriginal language of Queensland. It is the traditional language of the Kuku Yalanji people.

== Speakers ==
Despite conflicts between the Kuku Yalanji people and British settlers in Queensland, the Kuku Yalanji language has a healthy number of speakers, and that number is increasing. Though the language is threatened, the language use is vigorous and children are learning it in schools. All generations of speakers have positive language attitudes.

The Kuku Yalanji still practise their traditional religion, and they have rich oral traditions. Many people in the Kuku Yalanji community also use English. Around 100 Kuku Yalanji speakers can both read and write in Kuku Yalanji.

== Phonology ==
=== Vowels ===
Kuku-Yalanji uses the typical three-vowel system, /a, u, i/, used in other Aboriginal Australian languages.

	Front	Back
High	i	u
Low	a	

=== Consonants ===
This table uses the standard orthography used by both linguists and the speech community. Where the orthography differs from the IPA representation, the orthography is in brackets.

Stop sounds can range between voiced and voiceless releases.

	Peripheral		Laminal	Apical	
	Labial	Velar	Palatal	Alveolar	Retroflex
Plosive	p ~ b ⟨b⟩	k ~ ɡ ⟨g⟩	c ~ ɟ ⟨j⟩	t ~ d ⟨d⟩	
Nasal	m	ŋ ⟨ng⟩	ɲ ⟨ny⟩	n	
Lateral				l	
Trill				r ⟨rr⟩	
Approximant	w		j ⟨y⟩		ɻ ⟨r⟩
