= Wakara =

Wakara may refer to:

- Walkara, Shoshone chief
- Wakara people, or Wakura, Australia
  - Wakara language, or Kuku Wakura
