= Wagaman language =

Wagaman or Wakaman is the name of several languages in Queensland, Australia. It may refer to:

- Kuku-Wakaman, a variety of Kuku Yalanji language also known as just Wakaman language, spoken in far north Queensland
- Wagaman, the language of the Wakaman people of northern Queensland (possibly a variant of Wamin/Agwamin)
- Wamin language, also known as Agwamin, a language spoken by the Ewamian people of northern Queensland (possibly a variant of Wagaman, the language of the Wakaman people)

== See also ==
- Wagiman language, a language isolate spoken in the Northern Territory
