= Ngarrabullgan =

Mountain in Queensland, Australia

Coordinates: 16°52′00″S 144°45′00″E

Ngarrabullgan (Mount Mulligan)
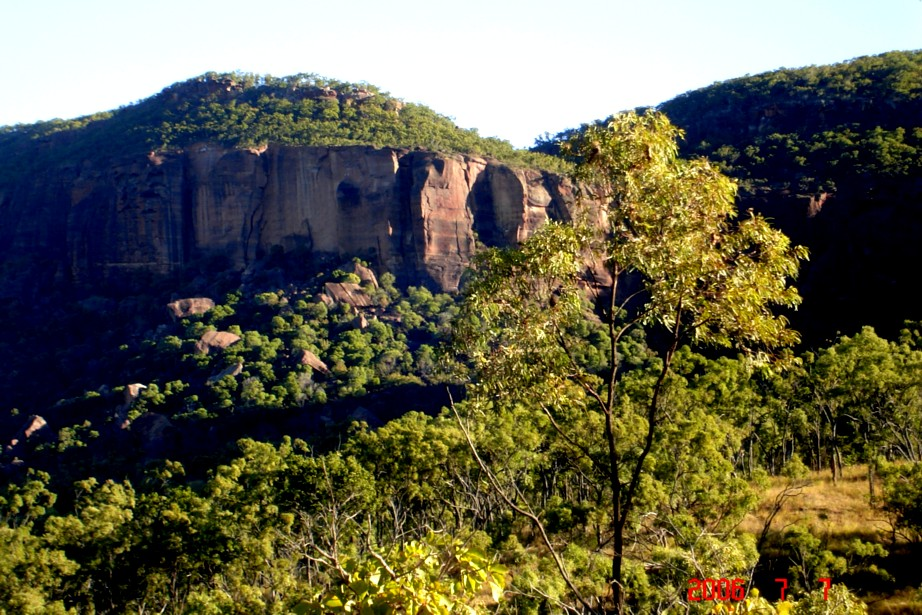
- View of Ngarrabullgan escarpment from the east

Highest point
- Elevation: 400 m (1,300 ft)above surrounding hills and plains

Geography
- Location: Hodgkinson River, 100 km west of Cairns, Queensland, Australia
- Parent range: Featherbed Ranges, between Mitchell & Walsh Rivers

Geology
- Mountain type(s): 18 km long, 6.5 km wide sandstone conglomerate tabletop mountain

Ngarrabullgan (also Njrrabulgan, Nurrabullgan, Ngarrabullgin, or Nguddaboolgan), officially named Mount Mulligan by the State, is a large tabletop mountain (18 km by 6.5 km) located 100 kilometres west of Cairns in the north of Queensland (Australia).

The tabletop mountain is a monolith bounded by high cliffs (or escarpments) that fall 200 to 400 m to the surrounding Hodgkinson Basin, making it an impressive natural monument which is regarded by the local Djungan Aboriginal peoples to be a sacred 'Dreaming' place (see Dreamtime), and features in the mythological legends and beliefs of other Aboriginal groups for hundreds of kilometres around.

On the tabletop itself are found the two oldest-known Aboriginal sites in Queensland: Nonda Rock and Ngarrabullgan Cave. Here Aboriginal cultural deposits have been radiocarbon dated, and dated by optically stimulated luminescence (OSL), back to 40,000+ years ago.

Other ancient Aboriginal rockshelter sites on the mountain have been dated to the end of the last ice age, and, together, the many 'archaeological' caves and rockshelters found in and around Ngarrabullgan constitutes Queensland's greatest density of known sites dating back more than 4,000 years BP.

The combination of impressive natural feature, Aboriginal beliefs and mythologies, and archaeological sites of such antiquity make Ngarrabullgan the oldest known and dated cultural landscape in Queensland, and a place of state, national and international interest and scientific significance.

== Geomorphology ==
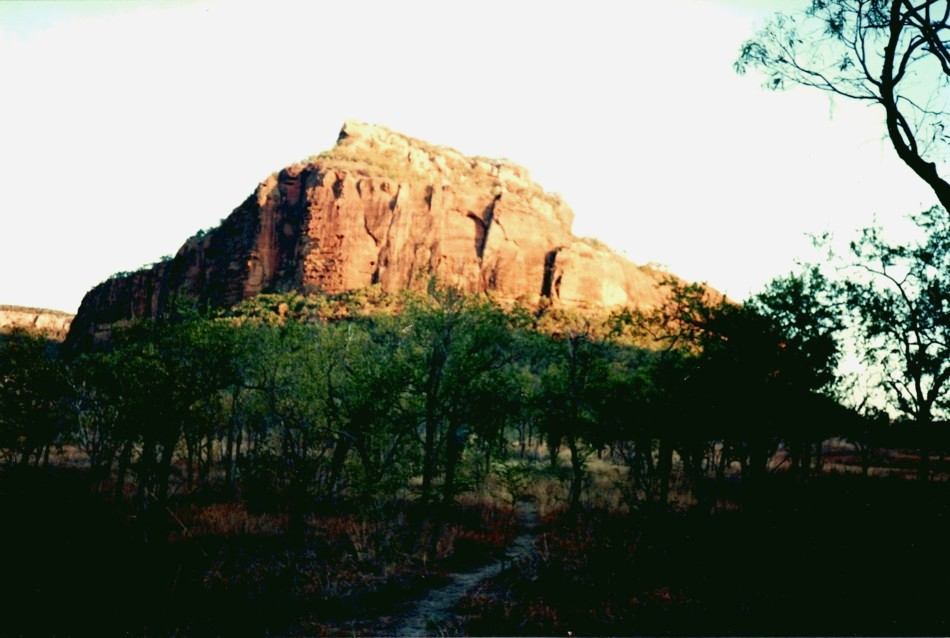
Ngarrabullgan from the north

The mountain was originally formed in a narrow faulted rift (running in a general south-east to north-west direction) within the deformed and folded metamorphic rock (arenite) of the Hodgkinson Basin. Successive layers of sediment were deposited into this rift filling it first with Permian coal (at its base), then Permian conglomerates, with Triassic sandstones above. With tectonic uplift the original arenite surrounding the deposits eroded away leaving Ngarrabullgan as a free-standing conglomerate and sandstone massif.

== Flora and fauna ==
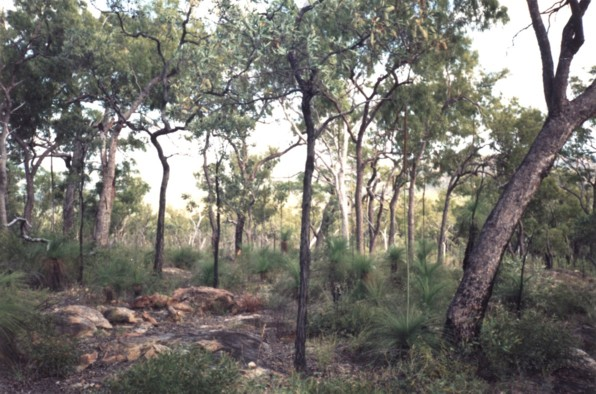
Ngarrabullgan vegetation on top

The vegetation on the Ngarrabullgan tabletop (plateau) has been described as wet sclerophyll forests, mainly of a bloodwood species of Eucalyptus, with a well-developed understory. These tabletop forests contrast, noticeably, with the open sclerophyll woodland of the surrounding hills and plains below.

Studies of both Ngarrabullgan's eucalypt forests and its surrounding woodlands identified 13 distinct land units supporting:

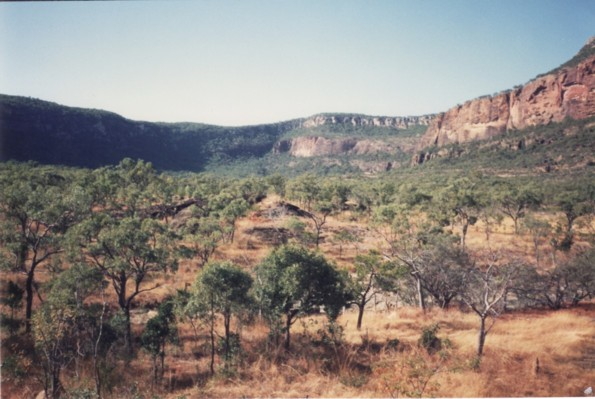
Ngarrabullgan vegetation below

Flora: 10 plant species that are considered either rare or threatened, including 8 plant species that are found nowhere else.

Fauna: 8 frog species, 55 reptile species, 99 bird species and 20 mammal species; 22 of which are species of special conservation significance under either the Queensland or Australian biodiversity conservation statutory regimes.

== Heritage status ==
=== Register of the National Estate ===
The Australian Heritage Commission included Ngarrabullgan on its register of the National Estate on 24 June 1997, describing it as a place that holds:

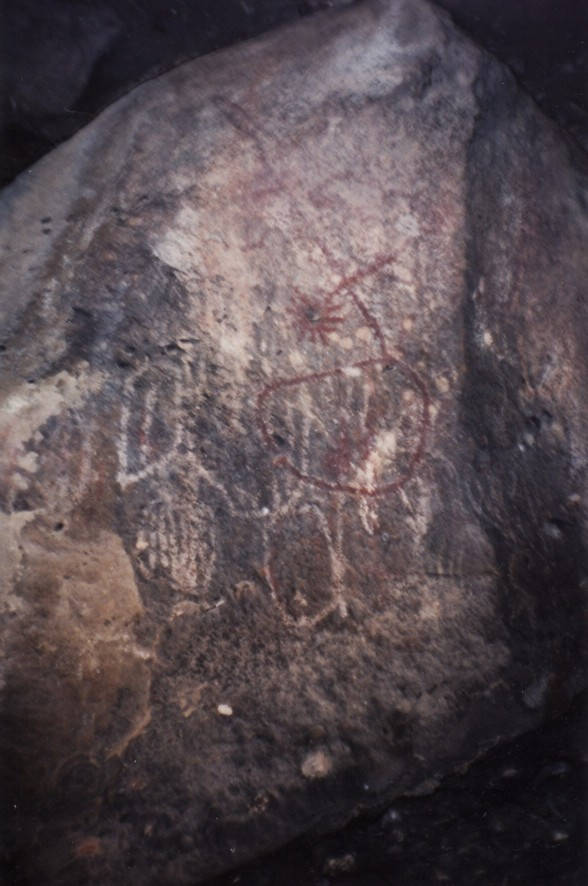
Rock art site on Ngarrabullgan

(a) important evidence enhancing the Australian communities' knowledge of Aboriginal occupation of Pleistocene into the Holocene;

(b) large diversity of well-preserved (intact) archaeological sites and features, some of which are directly associated with locally known initiation sites and places still sacred to the local Aboriginal peoples (both on top of the mountain and around the mountain's base);

(c) strong potential to yield new and important information about Aboriginal occupation, use, beliefs and lifestyles from the Pleistocene down to the present (especially as new archaeological techniques are developed and combined with further, ongoing research and study);

(d) excellent examples of the rock art and resource use of those Aboriginal peoples who have occupied and used the area for many generations and still, to this day, view the mountain as a major spiritual site at the heart of their country;

(e) considerable aesthetic impact combining an impressive physical presence as a large natural monument, together with natural and cultural features valuable to the Djungan peoples, other Aboriginal peoples, the people of Mareeba Shire, the North Queensland region more generally, and Australia as a whole.

=== Queensland Register of Aboriginal Heritage ===
For similar reasons the Queensland Government formally registered Ngarrabullgan as "The Mount Mulligan Aboriginal Cultural Heritage Area" under its Aboriginal heritage legislation (Aboriginal Cultural Heritage Act 2003 (Qld)) in 2006.

== History ==
=== Hodgkinson River gold-rush ===
Prior to gold rushes and the associated occupation of the Hodgkinson River area, Ngarrabullgin was a place of some spiritual and ceremonial significance to the Djungan Aboriginal peoples.

Ion Idriess in his far north Queensland gold prospecting story, wrote about Ngarrabullgan as follows:

"Farther out in those Chillagoe lands an outstanding landmark on the Hodgkinson is a massive wall of rock overlooking 'Mulligan's goldfield'. A meeting-place of the aborigines from time immemorial, it has seen the passing of a thousand tribes."

During and following the Hodgkinson River gold rush of 1876, the local Djungan population was decimated and the survivors were drawn to the fringes of mining settlements formed at Thornborough and Mount Mulligan. The Djungan peoples tell of how their grandparents had to flee from police and settlers, and by climbing Ngarrabullgan's escarpments they could sometimes escape the horses (some Djungan remember a cave on the south of the mountain where many were massacred and hidden).

It was also during these times that townspeople within the Hodgkinson goldfields fearful of Aborigines first experimented with a policy of 'pacification'. Local shop owner, John Byrnes, in 1882 brought a small group of Djungan peoples into town, feeding them meat and potatoes, and, soon, there were 150 Aborigines living in a camp just 8 km from Ngarrabullgan.

=== Mount Mulligan coal mining ===
By 1921 the Hodgkinson gold fields had declined, and a coal mine at Mount Mulligan had burrowed its way into the side of Ngarrabullgan, much to the fear of the Djungan Aboriginal peoples. On 19 September 1921 there was a huge explosion killing 75 people in what turned out to be Queensland's worst mining disaster (see also Mount Mulligan mine disaster). To the Djungan people this was retribution for disturbing the sacred mountain in which dwelt a 'white horse' and the spirit Eekoo.

By 1990 the coal mine had long been closed (since 1957); the mining towns had all broken down and been deserted; and the cattle-properties were profitless, run down with rubber-vine, feral pigs and brumbies. Ngarrabullgan, however, still stood to become the focus of a Djungan Aboriginal people's 'cultural renaissance'.

=== Cultural Renaissance ===
==== 1986 ====
Queensland Tourist and Travel Corporation (QTTC) staff, followed by Sir Frank Moore (QTTC Chairman) and the Queensland Minister for Tourism, visited Ngarrabullgan and Kondoparinga Station (the pastoral property within which Ngarrabullgan sits)to see if a small tourist resort should be built, and tourist enterprise developed within the vicinity of Ngarrabullgan, offering tourists an 'experience' of the mountain and surrounding heritage.

==== 1988 ====
Queensland Tourist and Travel Corporation (QTTC) had prepared and costed the feasibility of developing the tourism potential of Ngarrabullgan, and, by this time there was some genuine commercial interest in purchasing Kondoparinga property and Ngarrabullgan to enable a corporation operating out of Port Douglas to offer tourists and visitors an 'outback Queensland' experience.

==== 1990 ====
The person occupying Kondoparinga pastoral property and joint owner of the property (Mr Reg Adams) approached people then living in Mareeba expressing a strong wish to see Ngarrabullgan sold to the Djungan peoples who had enjoyed free access to his property for many years. The other owner of the property, Skyfleet, wished to see the property sold to the Japanese owned consortium who were interested in developing the property's identified tourism potential.:

==== 1991 ====
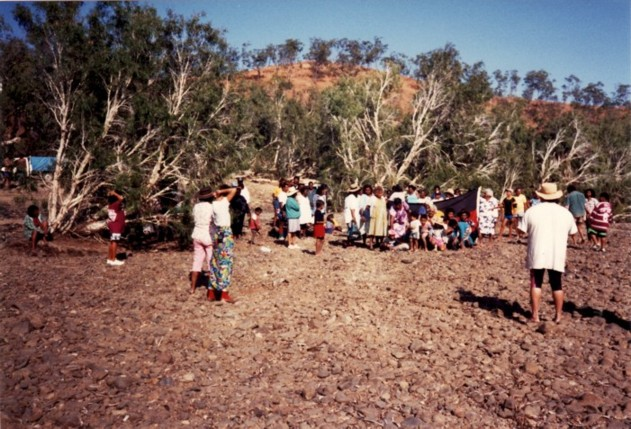
Kuku Djungan people gather 27 July 1991

27 July: over 150 Djungan people had travelled from Cairns, Yarrabah, Innisfail, Townsville, Chillagoe and Mareeba, to re-unite and form the Kuku Djungan Aboriginal Corporation; to raise the pan-Australian Aboriginal flag; and to resolve to regain ownership of Ngarrabullgan.

August: the Australian Government (i.e. Aboriginal and Torres Strait Islander Commission) approved the purchase of Kondoparinga property, and Ngarrabullgan, for the Djungan people.

December: Kondoparinga had been purchased, and the Djungan peoples had regained ownership of Ngarrabullgan. Queensland Government's Department

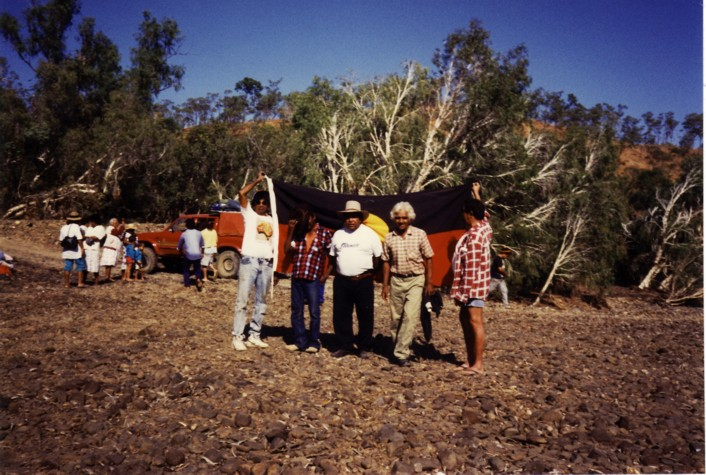
Kuku Djungan raise flag and resolve to regain ownership of Ngarrabullgan

of Environment had sought to excise Ngarrabullgan from the property at the time of purchase, but, at the last moment, a binding agreement was negotiated and agreed to see Ngrrabullgan remain part of the property and later declared a National Park to be managed by a majority Djungan board of management

==== 2007 ====
November: The Djungan people:

- have ownership of the mountain and developed management plans for its future protection and management;
- have registered the mountain with the Australian Heritage Commission to form part of Australia's 'National Estate'
- have nominated the mountain to be declared an Indigenous Protected Area under the Australian Government's protected area program
- have seen the mountain declared an 'Aboriginal cultural heritage area' under Queensland legislation.
- are still seeking to see Ngarrabullgin declared a National Park with a majority Djungan board of management, as agreed back in December 1991.

== Archaeological sites ==
Published archaeological sites (listed in rough geographical order, generally running from north to south).:

- Initiation Cave
- Gorge Creek Shelter
- Waterhole Cave

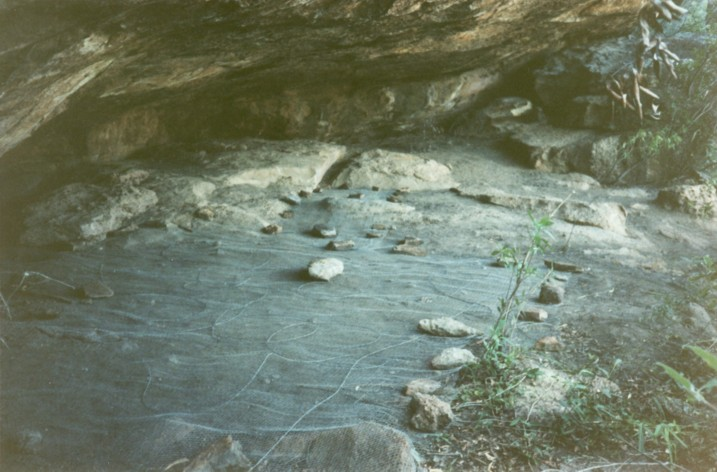
Ngarrabullgan Rockshelter Excavation Site

- Ngarrabullgan Cave
- Nonda Rock
- Quinine Bush Shelter
- Kookaburra Rock
- Courtyard Rock
- Dragonfly Hollow
- Fig Tree Shelter
- Hand Shelter:
- Grass Tree Shelter
- Lookout Shelter
- Painted Ell
- Tunnell Shelter
- Bush Peg Shelter

== See also ==
- Djungan
- Mount Mulligan, Queensland
- Mount Mulligan mine disaster
