= Acacia johannis =

Scientific classification
- Kingdom: Plantae
- Clade: Embryophytes
- Clade: Tracheophytes
- Clade: Spermatophytes
- Clade: Angiosperms
- Clade: Eudicots
- Clade: Rosids
- Order: Fabales
- Family: Fabaceae
- Subfamily: Caesalpinioideae
- Clade: Mimosoid clade
- Genus: Acacia
- Species: A. johannis

Binomial name
- Acacia johannis Pedley
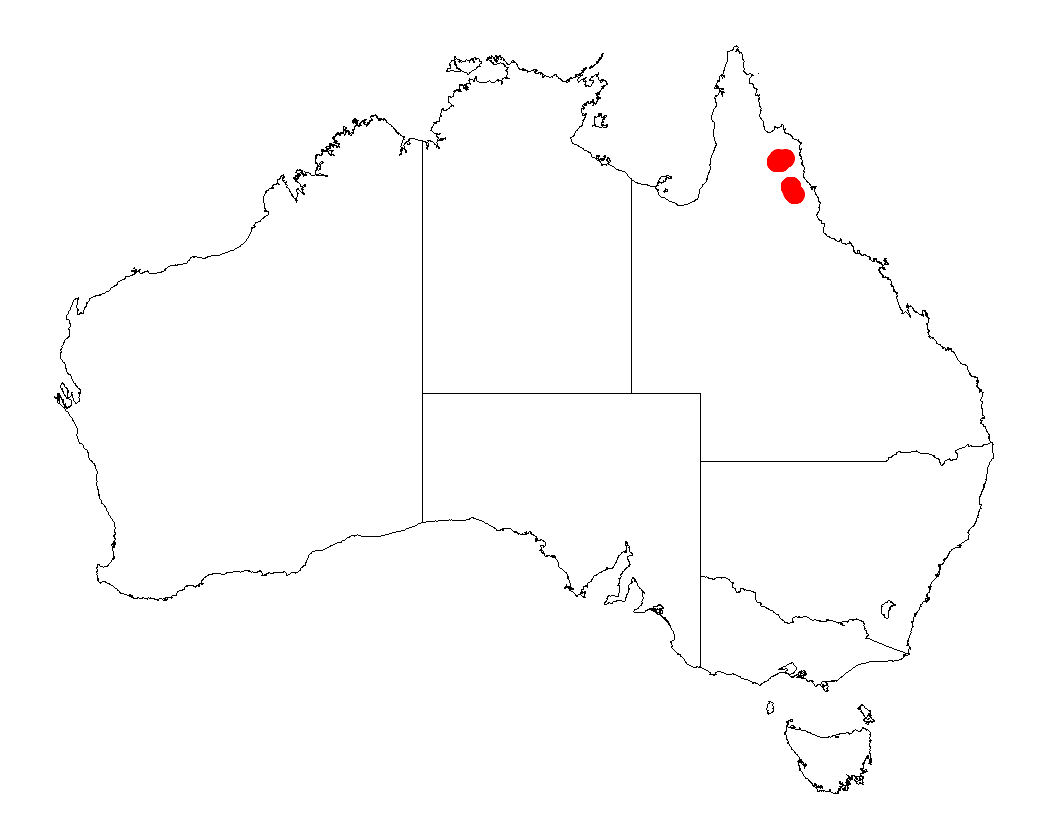
- Occurrence data from AVH

Synonyms
- Acacia sp. (Mt Mulligan J.R.Clarkson 8217); Racosperma johannis (Pedley) Pedley

Species of legume

Acacia johannis is a species of flowering plant in the family Fabaceae and is endemic to a restricted area of north Queensland, Australia. It is a shrub with narrowly elliptic, markedly sickle-shaped phyllodes, heads of lemon-yellow flowers and linear, glabrous, thinly leathery pods, more or less constricted between the seeds.

== Description ==
Acacia johannis is a shrub that typically grows to a height of up to 2 m (6 ft 7 in) and has glabrous, reddish-brown branchlets with many lenticels. Its phyllodes are narrowly elliptic and markedly sickle-shaped, 140–180 mm (5.5–7.1 in) long, mostly 5–10 mm (0.20–0.39 in) wide and glabrous with three or four prominent longitudinal veins and a prominent gland at the base. The flowers are borne in one or two heads in axils on a glabrous peduncle 10–20 mm (0.39–0.79 in) long, each head with about fifty lemon-yellow flowers. Flowering has been observed in February and April, and the pods are linear, 70–100 mm (2.8–3.9 in) long, 5–7 mm (0.20–0.28 in) wide, thinly leathery and glabrous, shallowly to moderately constricted between the seeds. The seeds are elliptic, 3.0–3.5 mm (0.12–0.14 in) long, about 2.5 mm (0.098 in) wide and dark brown with a club-shaped aril.

== Taxonomy ==
Acacia johannis was first formally described in 1999 by the botanist Leslie Pedley in the journal Austrobaileya from specimens collected on Mount Mulligan in 1990. The specific epithet (johannis) is derived from the Latin for 'John', honouring John R. Clarkson, who collected the type specimen, and "has significantly increased knowledge of plants species and communities of the region".

== Distribution and habitat ==
This species of wattle is restricted to north-eastern Queensland where it is common around Mount Mulligan on rock outcrops and pavements in soils derived from sandstone, where it sometimes forms dense thickets.

== Conservation status ==
Acacia johannis is listed as 'least concern' under the Queensland Government Nature Conservation Act 1992.

== See also ==
- List of Acacia species
