= Wakaman =

Indigenous Australian people

The Wakaman people, also spelt Wagaman, are an Aboriginal Australian people of the state of Queensland. According to some authorities, they may be interchangeable with the group identified by ethnographers as the Agwamin (aka Ewamian).

== Country ==
The Wakaman are a savannah-dwelling people of the headwaters of the Lynd River, whose northern extension ran to Mungana and the neighbourhood of Chillagoe. To the east their frontiers were on the Great Dividing Range, as far as Almaden. The western limits lay around Dagworth. On their southern flank, the frontier was around the area of Mount Surprise (near Brooklands). They were also present at Crystalbrook and Bolwarra. In Norman Tindale's estimation, they had some 4,800 square miles (12,000 km^{2}) of tribal land.

Many Wakaman people were later displaced to other places in Queensland, including Mareeba (where many descendants live), Hope Vale Mission, Yarrabah, Woorabinda, and Palm Island.

== Language ==
Wakaman
- Wagaman
- Native to: Australia
- Region: Queensland
- Ethnicity: Wakaman
- Extinct: 20th century
- Revival: 2020s
- Language family: Pama–Nyungan: Southern Paman; Wamin; Wakaman

Language codes
- ISO 639-3: –
- Glottolog: None
- AIATSIS: Y108

The language of the Wakaman people, according to AIATSIS' Austlang database, is Wagaman, which is a variant of the mutually intelligible Agwamin and Wamin languages, and not to be confused with the language called Wakaman or Kuku-Wakaman, which is a dialect of Kuku Yalanji.

The language had been dormant since the last speakers died in the 20th century; none had been recorded since at least 1975 and likely earlier. In the 2020s, filmmakers Chedwa Whyte and Lindsey Welch worked with local Wakaman people from Chillagoe, and a group visited the South Australian Museum to find what Norman Tindale had recorded about the language. They discovered archived notes and recordings, which also showed some words in several languages of the surrounding area, such as Mbabaram and Agwamin. The group is now working on a language revival project for the language of the Wakaman people.

== Social organisation ==
The Wakaman tribe was divided into smaller groups, of which two names at least survive:

- Okenyika
- Tjapatja

== Alternative names ==
Alternative spellings and names of the Wakaman people include:

- Wagaman
- Wakkamon
- Warkaman, Warkeeman, Warkeemin
- Warkamin, Warkemon, Warkeemon
- Wataman
- Okenyika
- Tjapatja

== Sources ==
- Herbermann, Clemens-Peter; Gröschel, Bernhard; Waßner, Ulrich Hermann; Kaczmarek, Ludger (2002). Sprache & Sprachen: Thesaurus zur allgemeinen Sprachwissenschaft und Sprachenthesaurus. Vol. 2. Otto Harrassowitz Verlag. ISBN 978-3-447-04567-4.
- Tindale, Norman Barnett (1974). "Wakaman (QLD)". Aboriginal Tribes of Australia: Their Terrain, Environmental Controls, Distribution, Limits, and Proper Names. Australian National University. ISBN 978-0-708-10741-6.
