= DJF (disambiguation) =

DJF may refer to:

- Djiboutian franc
- djf – Djangun language (code)
- December, January, February, a 3-month season period
