= Kuku Buyunji =

Indigenous Australian people

The Kuku Buyunji (Kokobujundji), alternatively known as the Kuku Nyungkal or Annan River tribe are an indigenous Australian people of the state of Queensland.

== Country ==
Norman Tindale stated that they hade approximately 300 square miles (780 km^{2}) of tribal land centered on the Annan River, extending southwards to Rossville. Their western extension ran to the Annan-Normanby Divide.

== Clans ==
Contemporary Kuku Buyunji/Kuku Nyungkal consider that they are a distinct clan from the broader Kuku Yalanji. The anthropologist Jon Christopher Anderson argues for the view that they are to be regarded as belonging to the same clan group. In Anderson's view,

The Upper Annan River area was divided into [between nine and twelve] patrilineal clan estates. Each estate was based on a discrete part of the Annan drainage basin... These ... estates formed a linguistically and culturally distinctive bloc over which travel and access to resources were relatively free for any person associated with the estates

== Language ==
They spoke the Kuku Nyungkal dialect of Guugu Yalandji

== Native title ==
By 1995, one century after the initial "invasion" by tin miners, an Aboriginal Land Tribunal inquired into the extent to which Kuku Nyungkal traditions, beliefs, and people had been impacted by the colonization of their country, The issue rose in deliberating on a claim to Crown Land in Helenvale: Wunbuwarra - Banana Creek. At that time Kuku Nyungkal representative Susan Coate submitted that

Aboriginal culture in south eastern Cape York Peninsula has changed considerably since the arrival of the first European land visitor in 1872 ... Technological innovations and introductions have altered many aspects of Kuku-Nyungkul life and their economic and political system has also been affected by the social forces of a dominant way of life imposing itself on a previously independent people. Living away from country in a centralised community much of the time has also meant changes. The culture of the Kuku-Nyungkul people is not the same as it was one hundred years ago.

On 9 December 2007, the Kuku Nyungkal people were included within an overarching Federal Court native title determination in which their legal right to their own lands and waters was retrospectively acknowledged, and new exclusive rights to possess, occupy, use and enjoys some of their original lands along the Annan River was restored.

== Alternative names ==
- Kokonyungal
- Bujundji
- Gugubuyun
- Kokobulanji
- Gugu-bullanji
- Annan River tribe

== Sources ==
- "Aboriginal Land Claim to Available Crown Land near Helenvale: Wunbuwarra-Banana Creek". Australian Indigenous Law Reporter. 1996.
- "AIATSIS map of Indigenous Australia". AIATSIS. 14 May 2024.
- Anderson, Jon Christopher (1985). The political and economic basis of Kuku-Yalanji social history (PhD thesis). University of Queensland.
- Anderson, Jon Christopher (April 1989). "Aborigines and tin mining in North Queensland: a case study on the anthropology of contact history". Mankind. 13 (6): 473–498.
- "Bama Ngulkurrku Wawu Wawurrku Bundangka Bubungu Jalunbu: Healthy Mob, Healthy Land and Sea Plan" (PDF). Jabalbina Yalanji Aboriginal Corporation. August 2012.
- "Eastern Kuku Yalanji People's native title determination" (PDF). National Native Title Tribunal. 2007.
- Maclean, Kirsten; Bana Yaralji Bubu Inc (January 2011). Water Dreaming: Kuku Nyungkal people, water and country in the Wet Tropics (Report). CSIRO – via researchgate.net.
- Tindale, Norman Barnett (1974). "Kokobujundji (QLD)". Aboriginal Tribes of Australia: Their Terrain, Environmental Controls, Distribution, Limits, and Proper Names. Australian National University Press. ISBN 978-0-708-10741-6.
