= Ewamian =

Indigenous people of Queensland, Australia

The Ewamian or Agwamin people are an Aboriginal Australian people of the state of Queensland.

== Language ==
The language of Ewamian people, now undergoing revival, is variously known as Agwamin or Wamin. Elder Fred Fulford, as documented by Peter Sutton in the early 1970s, explained that Agwamin and Wamin were originally two mutually intelligible dialects, one "heavy" and one "light". There was said to be one living speaker of the language alive in 1981.

== Country ==
The Ewamian People are the traditional owners of an area of north-western Queensland extending over the Gilbert and Einasleigh River catchment areas, including Georgetown, Mount Surprise, Forsayth, and Einasleigh. Ewamian country includes Undara Volcanic National Park, Cobbold Gorge, and Talaroo hot springs. The Savannah Way travels across Ewamian country. The Ewamian People have had native title determined over more than 2,900,000 ha (7,200,000 acres).

In Norman Tindale's estimation, the Ewamian had approximately 5,700 square miles (15,000 km^{2}) of tribal land, centering on the headwaters of the Einasleigh and Copperfield Rivers. Their northern limits reached as far as Georgetown], Mount Surprise, and Lancewood. Their eastern boundaries lay up around the Great Dividing Range, while their western reaches touched the headwaters of the Percy River. They were present at the contemporary sites of Oak Park, Einasleigh, and Forsayth.

To the north of Ewamian country is that of Wakaman with Mbabaram to the north-east. In clockwise direction, Ewamian's eastern neighbours are the Warungu, and the Gugu-Badhun, and, south-east, the Gudjal. On their southern side were the Mbara, with Yanga and Tagalaka to the west.

== Alternative names ==
- Ewamian
- Wimanja
- Agwamin
- Egwamin
- Gwamin
- Ak Waumin
- Wamin
- Wommin, Waumin, Wawmin
- Walamin
- Wommin
- Walming
- Wailoolo

== Some words ==
- twa (dog)
- moa (man)
