= Kokowalandja =

Aboriginal Australian people

The Kokowalandja were an indigenous Australian people of northern Queensland.

== Country ==
The Kokowalandja are stated, by Norman Tindale, to have had a territorial extent of some 600 square miles (1,600 km^{2}), around the headwaters of the east Normanby River, with a westward extension to the Great Dividing Range.

== Alternative names ==
- Koko Katji (Kokojelandji exonym)

== Sources ==
- Tindale, Norman Barnett (1974). "Kokowalandja (QLD)". Aboriginal Tribes of Australia: Their Terrain, Environmental Controls, Distribution, Limits, and Proper Names. Australian National University Press.
