= Muluridji =

Aboriginal Australian people

The Muluridji are an indigenous Australian people of the state of Queensland.

== Country ==
The Muluridji had an estimated (by Norman Tindale) 1,100 square miles (2,800 km^{2}) of territory, starting from the headwaters of the Mitchell River northwards as far as Mount Carbine. The eastern frontier ran to Rumula, while their southern boundary was on the Atherton Tableland at Mareeba. Their western limit was Woodville, mainly in the drier country west of the rainforest margin between Biboohra and Mount Molloy.

== Social organization ==
One clan name at least survives:

- Kokanodna

== Alternative names ==
- Muluridyi, Mulari-ji, Mularitchee, Mullridgey
- Molloroiji
- Moorlooratchee (Wakara exonym)
- Koko-moloroitji, Koko-moloroiji (Kokokulunggur exonym)
- Kokanodna

== Sources ==
- Tindale, Norman Barnett (1974). "Muluridji(QLD)". Aboriginal Tribes of Australia: Their Terrain, Environmental Controls, Distribution, Limits, and Proper Names. Australian National University Press.
