= Yungkurara =

Aboriginal Australian people

The Yungkurara were an indigenous Australian people of the state of Queensland.

== Country ==
Norman Tindale estimated Yungkjurara lands as occupying 500 square miles (1,300 km^{2}) around the Bloomfield River. They were the indigenous people of Weary Bay. Their southern limits were at Cape Kimberley. They were also present in the area of Spring Vale.

== Social organization ==
The names of at least two hordes are known: (Note: Tindale's source mentions these two among a list of several Weary Bay tribes:'Boolpoonnarra, Koonara, Wolburra, Moolburra, Moo-arra, Yokarra, Ikkarra, Yekkara, Amaggi, and Gengagi.)

- Bulponara
- Yokarra

== Alternative names ==
- Yungkarara
- Junkara
- Koko Dyungay
- Yungurara
- Yung-Kurara
- Koko-aungu
- Kokodjilandji
- Kokojalanja
- Kokoyalunyu
- Koko Ialunia
- Koko Ialiu
- Bulponara, Bulpoonarra
- Yokarra

== Some words ==
- kai'a tame dog
- nundin (father)
- nammo (mother)
- wangar (white man)

== Sources ==
- Hughes, Thomas (1886). "Weary Bay" (PDF). In Curr, Edward Micklethwaite (ed.). The Australian race: its origin, languages, customs, place of landing in Australia and the routes by which it spread itself over the continent. Vol. 2. Melbourne: J. Ferres. pp. 393–395.
- McConnel, Ursula H. (September 1939). "Social Organization of the Tribes of Cape York Peninsula, North Queensland". Oceania. 10 (1): 54–72. doi:10.1002/j.1834-4461.1939.tb00256.x. JSTOR 40327744.
- McConnel, Ursula H. (June 1940). "Social Organization of the Tribes of Cape York Peninsula, North Queensland (Continued)". Oceania. 10 (4): 434–455. doi:10.1002/j.1834-4461.1940.tb00305.x. JSTOR 40327867.
- Sharp, R. Lauriston (March 1939a). "Tribes and Totemism in North-East Australia". Oceania. 9 (3): 254–275. doi:10.1002/j.1834-4461.1939.tb00232.x. JSTOR 40327744.
- Sharp, R. Lauriston (June 1939b). "Tribes and Totemism in North-East Australia (Continued)". Oceania. 9 (4): 439–461. doi:10.1002/j.1834-4461.1939.tb00248.x. JSTOR 40327762.
- Tindale, Norman Barnett (1974). "Jungkurara (QLD)". Aboriginal Tribes of Australia: Their Terrain, Environmental Controls, Distribution, Limits, and Proper Names. Australian National University Press.
