= Kuku Kulunggur =

Australian aboriginal tribe

The Kokokulunggur are an indigenous Australian people of North Queensland.

== Country ==
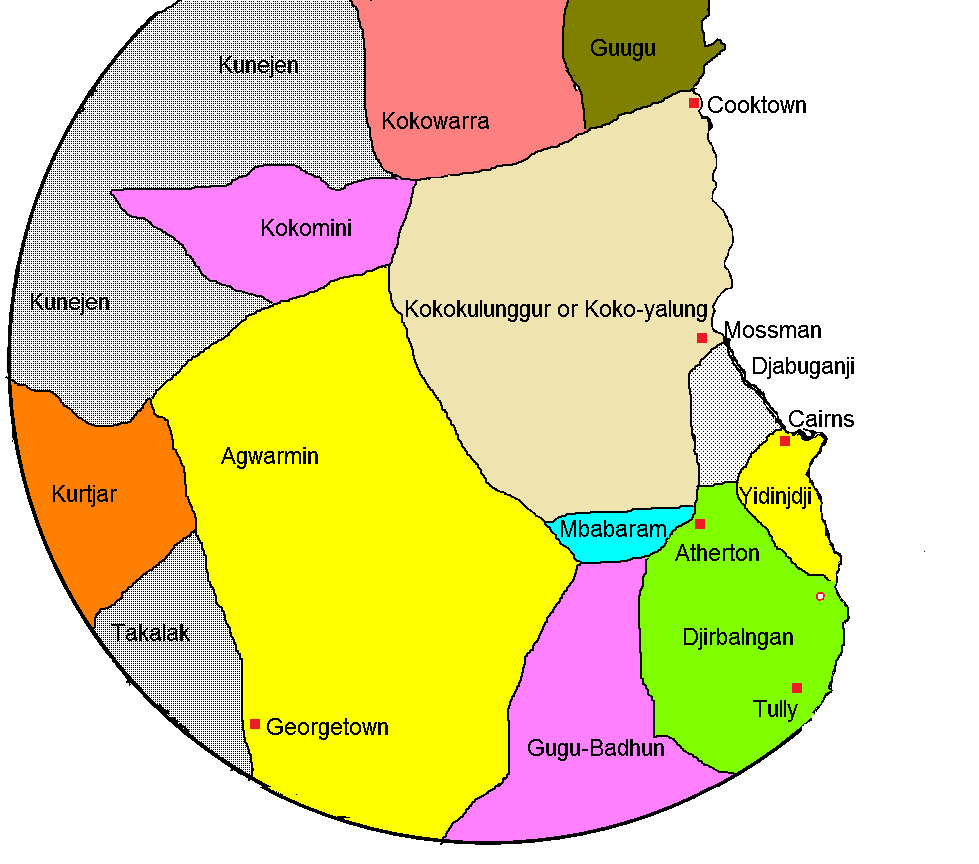
Traditional lands of the Aboriginal peoples around Cairns

In Norman Tindale's estimation their traditional lands covered some 300 square miles (780 km^{2}), encompassing the area around Port Douglas and Mossman north to Daintree. Their inland extension was around Mount Carbine.

== History of contact ==
Cook Sailed past the Kokokulunggur in 1770 before being wreaked near Cooktown, and there was later some conflict between the Kokokulunggur and early pastoralists.

== Alternative names ==
- Koko-yalung
- Ngarlkajee (Wakara exonym)

== Sources ==
- "AIATSIS map of Indigenous Australia". AIATSIS. 14 May 2024.
- Richards, F. (1926). Customs and language of the Western Hodgkinson aboriginals. Vol. 8. Memoirs of the Queensland Museum. pp. 249–265.
- Tindale, Norman Barnett (1974). "Kokokulunggur (QLD)". Aboriginal Tribes of Australia: Their Terrain, Environmental Controls, Distribution, Limits, and Proper Names. Australian National University Press.
- Wood, Ray (2016). "The problem of 'tribal names' in eastern Australia:The Kuku Yalanji example". In Verstraete, Jean-Christophe; Hafner, Diane (eds.). Land and Language in Cape York Peninsula and the Gulf Country. John Benjamins Publishing Company. pp. 337–360. ISBN 978-9-027-26760-3.
