= Wulpura =

Aboriginal Australian people

The Wulpura were an indigenous Australian people of the state of Queensland. Their language, Kuku Waldja, has been listed as a dialect of Kuku Yalanji, but there does not appear to be any data available.

== Country ==
According to Norman Tindale, the Wulpara controlled about 900 square miles (2,300 km^{2}) of territory. They lived in the rainforested main range that lies west of Mount Romeo and Boolbun, and around the headwaters of the Daintree River on the Mount Windsor tableland.

== People ==
According to one informant, the Wulpura were a people of relatively diminutive stature, on an average about 5 feet tall and weighing around 100 pounds. They engaged in an annual walkabout that would take them from South Mossman, via Julatten, and the Carbine River as far as the Daintree River, and before returning to their point of departure.

== Alternative names ==
- Koko-baldja (language name)
- Kokowaldja
- Waldja
- Walpoll
- Wolpa (toponym)
- Woora (toponym for a site on the South Mossman River)
- Wulpurara, Wulbur-ara
- Wulurara

Source: Tindale 1974, p. 190

== Sources ==
- McConnel, Ursula H. (September 1939). "Social Organization of the Tribes of Cape York Peninsula, North Queensland". Oceania. 10 (1): 54–72. doi:10.1002/j.1834-4461.1939.tb00256.x. JSTOR 40327720.
- McConnel, Ursula H. (June 1940). "Social Organization of the Tribes of Cape York Peninsula, North Queensland (Continued)". Oceania. 10 (4): 434–455. doi:10.1002/j.1834-4461.1940.tb00305.x. JSTOR 40327867.
- Tindale, Norman Barnett (1974). "Wulpura (QLD)". Aboriginal Tribes of Australia: Their Terrain, Environmental Controls, Distribution, Limits, and Proper Names. Australian National University Press. ISBN 978-0-708-10741-6.
