= Wamin language =

Australian Aboriginal language

Agwamin
- Wamin
- Native to: Australia
- Region: Queensland
- Ethnicity: Ewamin, Wakaman
- Extinct: by 2005
- Revival: exist
- Language family: Pama–Nyungan: Southern Paman; Agwamin
- Dialects: Agwamin; Wamin; Wakaman

Language codes
- ISO 639-3: wmi
- Glottolog: wami1239
- AIATSIS: Y132, Y133, Y108
- ELP: Agwamin
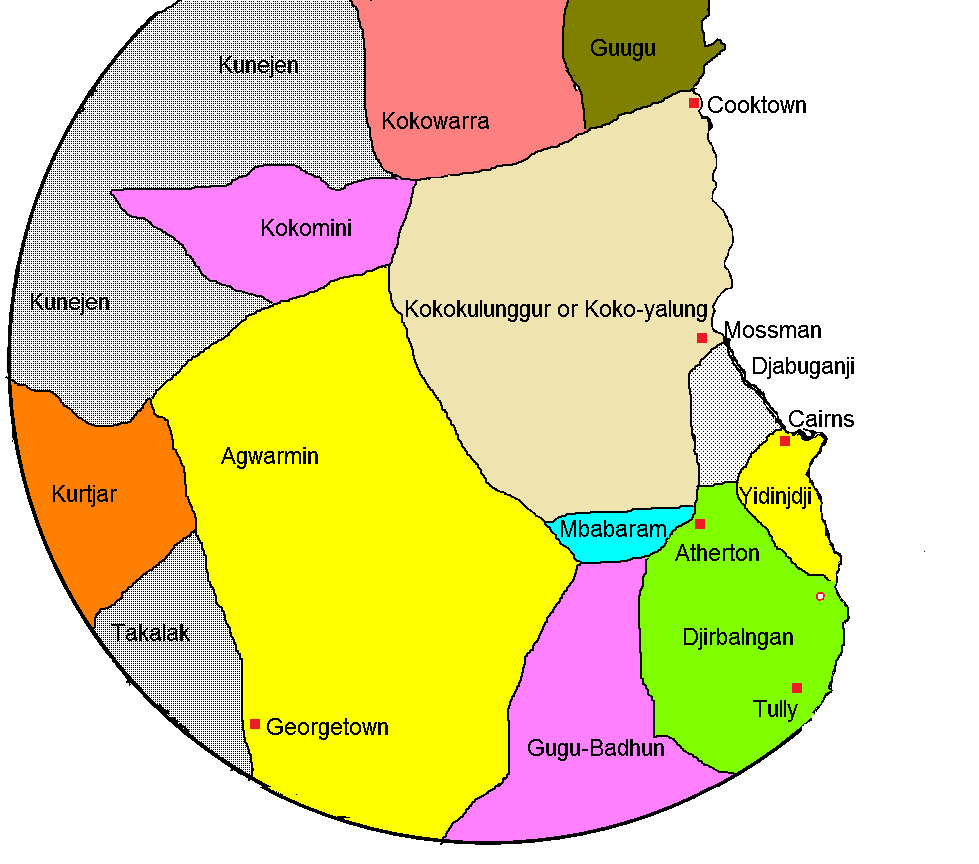
- Traditional lands of the Aboriginal peoples around Cairns; Agwamin in yellow.

Wamin, also known as Agwamin or Ewamian, is an Australian Aboriginal language of North Queensland spoken by the Ewamian people. Wamin was traditionally spoken in the Etheridge region, in the areas around Einasliegh, Georgetown, and Mount Surprise.

== Alternative names and dialects ==
The language of Ewamian people, now undergoing revival, is variously known as Wamin or Agwamin. Elder Fred Fulford, as documented by Peter Sutton in the early 1970s, explained that Agwamin and Wamin were originally two mutually intelligible dialects, one 'heavy' and one 'light'. There was said to be one living speaker of the language alive in 1981. Dixon (2002) counts Wamin as an alternative name for Agwamin.

The language of the Wakaman people, Wagaman, is thought by some linguists to be a variant of the mutually intelligible Agwamin and Wamin languages.

The following is a list of alternative names for Wamin:

- Wamin
- Agwamin
- E'wamin
- Ewamin
- Wimanja
- Egwamin
- Gwamin
- Ak Waumin
- Wamin
- Wommin, Waumin, Wawmin
- Walamin
- Wommin
- Walming
- Wailoolo

== Phonology ==
=== Consonants ===
	Peripheral		Laminal		Apical
	Labial	Velar	Dental	Palatal	Alveolar/ Retroflex
Plosive	p	k	t̪	c	t
Nasal	m	ŋ	n̪	ɲ	n
Trill					r
Lateral					l
Approximant	w			j	ɻ

=== Vowels ===
	Front	Central	Back
High	i		u
Mid	e	ɵ	o
Low		a	

/ɵ/ may also be heard as a [ə] sound.

== Vocabulary ==
Some words in Wamin language are:

- twa (dog)
- moa (man)
