= Mount Mulligan mine disaster =

1921 Australian mine disaster

Coordinates: 15.85°S 144.867°E

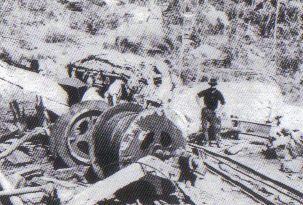
- The cable drums, blown 50 feet (15 m) from their foundations
- Date: 19 September 1921
- Time: 9:25 a.m. (AEST; UTC+10:00)
- Location: Mount Mulligan, Queensland, Australia
- Type: Mining accident
- Cause: The firing of an explosive charge on top of a large block of fallen machine cut coal
- Deaths: 75

The Mount Mulligan mine disaster occurred on 19 September 1921 in Mount Mulligan, Far North Queensland, Australia. A series of explosions in the local coal mine, audible as much as 30 km away, rocked the close-knit township. Seventy-five workers were killed by the disaster, making it the third-worst coal mining accident in Australia in terms of human lives lost. Four of the dead had been at the mouth of the pit at the time of the explosion. Seventy four bodies were recovered by the time the Royal Commission ended, the last body was recovered five months after the disaster after the mine had reopened. The disaster affected people in cities and towns all over the country. The mine, which had operated for six years at the time of the accident, was widely considered safe and had no previous indications of gas leaks. The miners hence worked using open flame lights instead of safety lamps.

== Public inquiry ==
A Royal Commission into the accident confirmed that the disaster was caused by the accidental or negligent firing of an explosive charge on top of a block of coal, apparently in order to split it. No methane was ever detected in the mine and candles and naked flames were used throughout its history (Royal Commission: 1921). The investigation found that explosives were used, stored, distributed and carried underground in a careless manner. It was also determined that the lack of appropriate means to render the coal dust safe in the mine was a violation of law. The coal seams at Mt Mulligan are conspicuously dry, leading to the ignition of coal dust from the firing of the charge.

The disaster was also the impetus for the passing of a Coal Mining Act in Queensland that would ban the use of open flames in underground coal mines.

== Aftermath ==
The mine was reopened after four months and suffered surprisingly little damage from the explosion. In 1923, the Queensland Government bought it from the operators. It was in operation until 1957, although it was heavily subsidised after World War II. The mine's final demise occurred with the completion of the Tully Falls hydro electricity scheme. Soon after, the town was sold and most of the buildings were removed.

== See also ==
- Blantyre mining disaster
- Mount Kembla Mine disaster
