= Mount Mulligan, Queensland =

Mount Mulligan
- Town
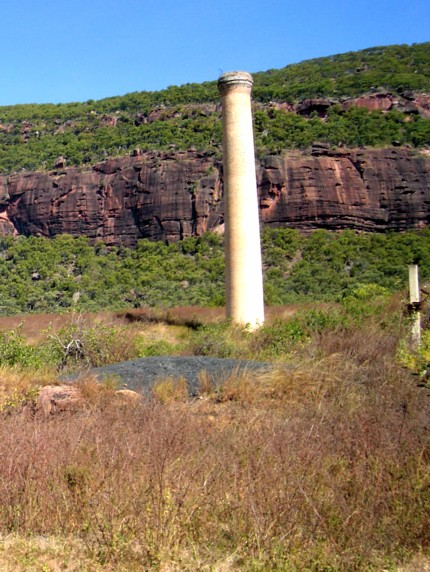
- Chimney at Mount Mulligan (June 2006)

- Interactive map of Mount Mulligan
- Coordinates: 16.8558°S 144.8736°E
- Country: Australia
- State: Queensland
- LGA: Shire of Mareeba
- Location: 52.7 km (32.7 mi) NNW of Dimbulah; 95.9 km (59.6 mi) NW of Mareeba; 157 km (98 mi) W of Cairns; 1,797 km (1,117 mi) NNW of Brisbane
- Established: 1910

Government
  - State electorate: Cook
  - Federal division: Leichhardt

Area
  - Total: 1,516.0 km^{2} (585.3 sq mi)

Population
  - Total: 0 (2021 census)
  - Density: 0.0000/km^{2} (0.0000/sq mi)
- Time zone: UTC+10:00 (AEST)
- Postcode: 4871
Localities around Mount Mulligan
Hurricane	Mount Carbine	Southedge
Nychum	Mount Mulligan	Paddys Green
Chillagoe	Thornborough	Glen Russell

Mount Mulligan is a former mining town and now a rural locality in the Shire of Mareeba, Queensland, Australia. In the 2021 census, the locality of Mount Mulligan had "no people or a very low population".

It is the site of the Mount Mulligan mine disaster, Queensland's worst mining disaster.

== Geography ==
Although still officially gazetted, Mount Mulligan is now a ghost town, with a single cemetery, a single occupied residence, a single chimney stack, and the overgrown remains of the once busy mining operations and electricity generator.

Nearby towns are Julatten, Dimbulah, Mount Carbine and Mount Molloy.

== History ==
The conglomerate and sandstone mountain range is known to local Djungan people as Ngarrabullgan. The Djungan people began living on the mountain about 40,000 years ago but ceased to camp on the range about 600 years ago. The range was named Mount Mulligan after prospector James Venture Mulligan by his colleagues in their 1874 exploration expedition searching the Hodgkinson River for gold. The name Mount Mulligan was later given to the town that grew in the shadows of the range's escarpment.

The town's coal was mined from shafts dug into a Permian layer within the cliff face or escarpment of a large 18 kilometres (11 mi) x 6.5 kilometres (4.0 mi) free-standing conglomerate and sandstone massif (rising up to 400 metres above the township). It was a coal mining town from 1910 until 19 September 1921 when an underground explosion killed 75 miners (all of the miners in the mine including those near the entrance). The mine closed, but reopened in 1922 and continued in production until 1957 when a hydro-electric scheme eliminated the need for the coal.

Mount Mulligan Post Office opened by July 1914 (a receiving office had been open from 1907) and closed in 1959. A Mount Mulligan Rail Post Office was open between 1916 and 1920.

The Chillagoe railway connected Mount Mulligan with Dimbulah. It opened on 7 April 1915 and was officially closed in January 1958.

== Demographics ==
In the 2006 census, the locality of Mount Mulligan and the surrounding area had a population of 55 people.

In the 2016 census, the locality of Mount Mulligan had "no people or a very low population".

In the 2021 census, the locality of Mount Mulligan had "no people or a very low population".

== Education ==
There are no schools in Mount Mulligan. The nearest primary and secondary school (P-10) school is Dimbulah State School in Dimbulah to the south, but it would be too distant from many parts of Mount Mulligan. Also, there are no secondary school to Year 12 nearby. Distance education and boarding school are the alternatives.

== See also ==
- Ngarrabullgan
