= Kuku Yalanji =

Aboriginal Australian people

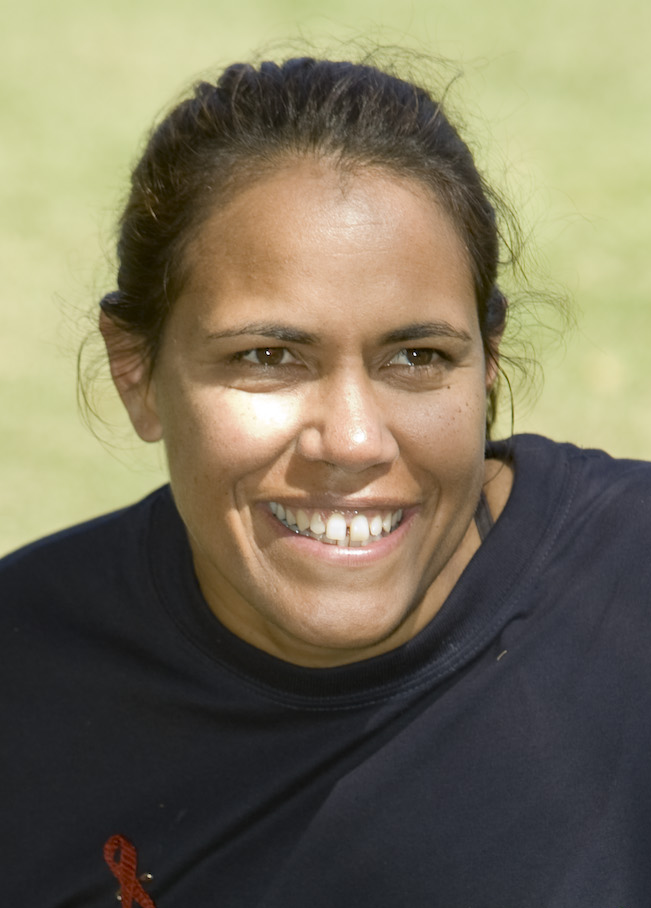
Kuku Yalanji athlete Cathy Freeman

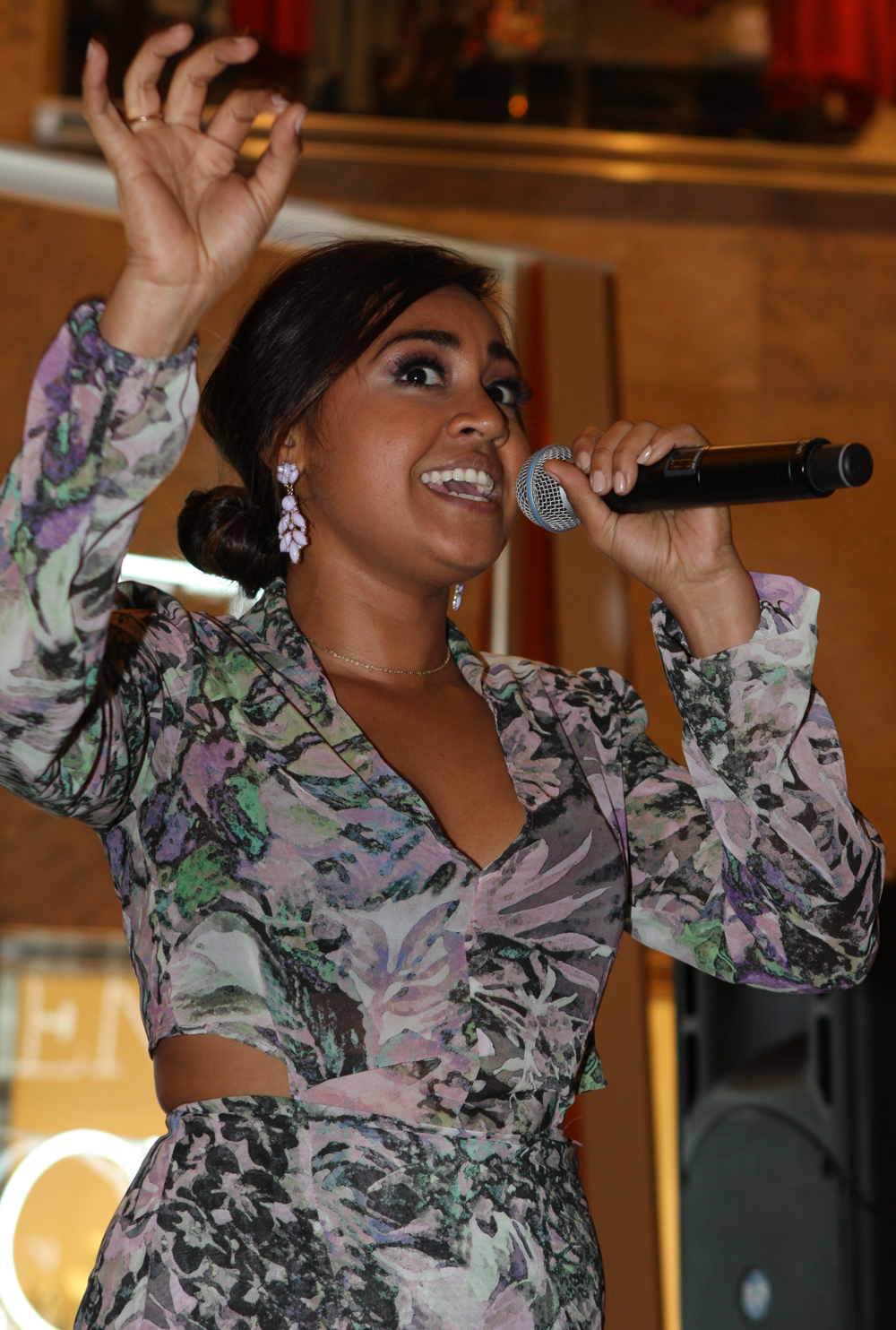
Jessica Mauboy's mother is Kuku Yalanji.

The Kuku Yalanji, also known as Gugu-Yalanji, Kuku Yalandji or Kokojelandji, are an Aboriginal Australian people originating from the rainforest regions of Far North Queensland.

== Language ==
The traditional language of the people is Guugu Yalandji. It has been comprehensively studied, with a dictionary produced by Hank and Ruth Hershberger and a grammar by Elizabeth Patz.

== Country ==
The Kuku Yalanji, according to Norman Tindale, held roughly 2,200 square miles (5,700 km^{2}) of territory around the headwaters of the Palmer River. Their land ran east from Palmerville station to Mount Lukin, and stretched over the southern and western areas of the Dividing Range as far as the upper Mitchell River. The eastern limits lay around east to Byerstown, and they were present at Maytown.

== History of contact ==
One of the oldest living cultures, dating back to the earliest human occupation of the continent around 50,000 years ago, the Kuku Yalanji began to have their homeland occupied extensively by European colonisers in 1877, after the Australian government opened up this area to selection, and as miners crowded into the area, where the Palmer River Gold Rush had been underway since news leaked out of a discovery of that mineral in June 1873. Within a year, over 5,000 Europeans and 2,000 Chinese, mainly from Guangdong, crammed into the Palmer River site, until then the sole preserve of the Kuku Yalanji people, to work its riches.

Attempts made to uproot the people from their homeland were resisted. A Lutheran mission opened up on the Bloomfield River in 1886, but it failed within 16 years of its establishment. Forced removals of more Kuku Yalanji people were undertaken again in the 1930s. The police and army transported them in dire conditions to missions at Daintree and Mossman. As late as 1957, a further attempt to relocate groups to a mission in Bloomfield took place.

The gold rush lasted from 1873 to 1885, with the Palmer population of Chinese briefly skyrocketing to some 17,000 by 1877, until the opportunities for quick takings began to dwindle, with most Europeans leaving by 1880, and the Chinese numbers dropping drastically to 3,000. In response to this overwhelming invasion, the Kuku Yalanji set up a fierce resistance, virtually tantamount to guerilla warfare.

The Kuku Yalanji were eventually reduced to living in shanty towns on the outskirts of the areas which the foreign populations developed, and developed skills for working in the new economy. Often, in trading their services with the Chinese, Kuku Yalenjis were paid in opium, which could be imported legally until 1906. According to contemporary European observers appointed as Protectors of Aborigines, such as Walter Roth and Archibald Meston, consumption of this drug in the form of opium ash mixed with water accounted for thousands of native deaths, far more than those due to other introduced maladies such as venereal disease.

Modern historians now consider that these early reports, like the tales of the Kuku Yalanji hunting Chinese for cannibalistic feasting, whatever partial truth they contain, functioned to assuage any guilt European settlers may have felt for their key role in the decimation of northern Queensland Aboriginal communities.

From 1897 to the 1960s, the Kuku Yalanji, like other Australian ethnic groups, faced the Australian government's paternalistic legislation that allowed for members of these ethnic groups to be placed under "protection" by placing them in Aboriginal reserves. Ostensibly, it was to preserve their cultures; in reality this program was an element of the White Australia policy to remove them from the urban and other "white" areas. The Kuku Yalanji began concentrating around the Mossman Reserve around the time of World War II and the people in the Daintree region were forced to the northern bank of the Daintree River. They were further subjected to more expulsions and waves of relocations by the Australian government. The Kuku Yalanji are now concentrated predominantly in Mossman and Wujal Wujal.

== Traditional lifestyle ==
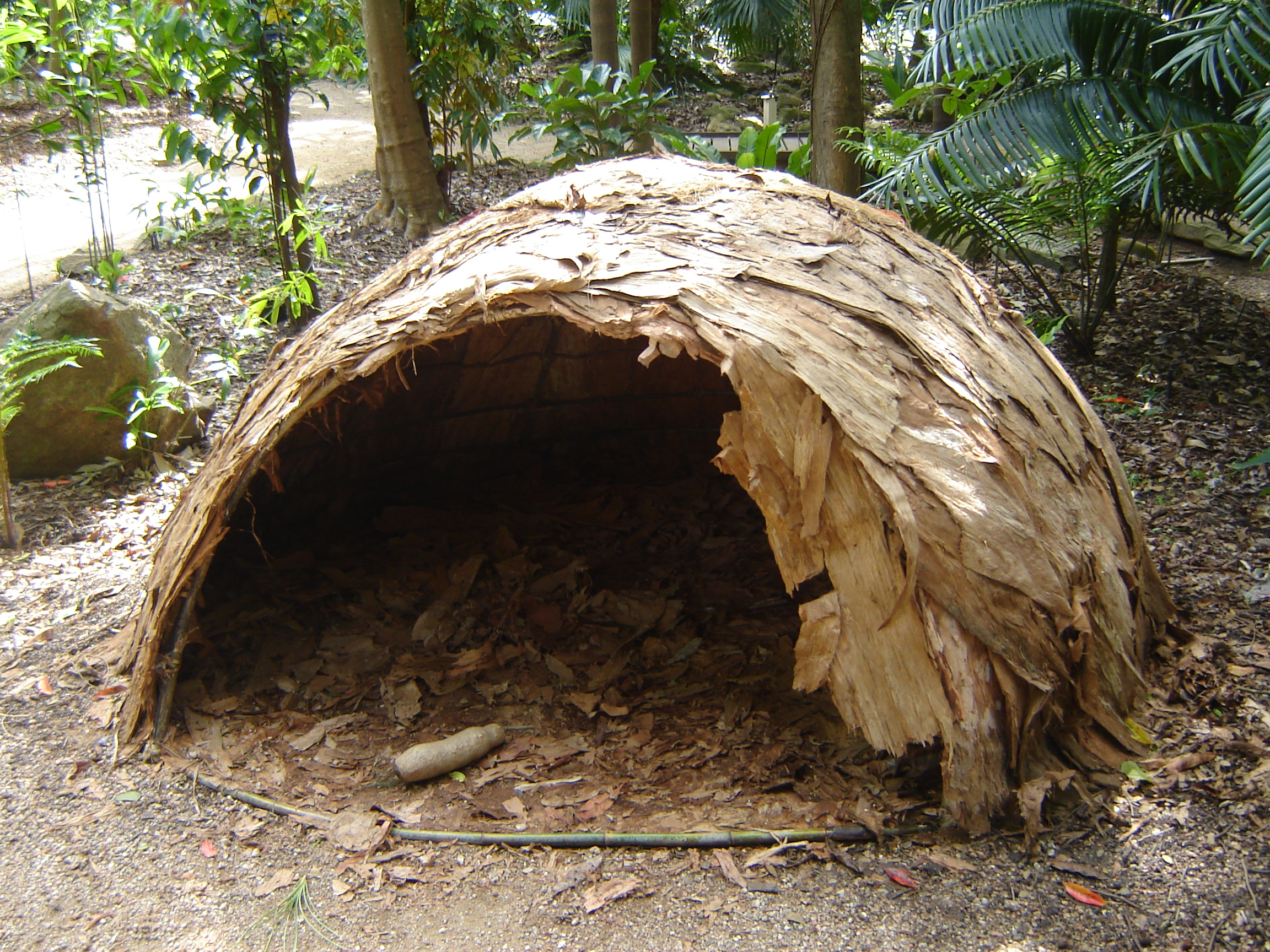
A short–term–use hut built by Indigenous Australians such as the Kuku Yalanji people

Survival was dependent on the exploitation of seasonal variation. It is believed that Kuku Yalanji lived in the rainforest region no later than 4,000 years ago. It is known that they had high population density, and lived in semi-permanent gunyahs. Their staples for obtaining carbohydrates were the toxic seeds of Cycas media, which were leached of their poisonous compounds before cooking; two species of yam, with the variety known as bitter yam particularly sought after, supplemented by bitter walnut, candlenuts and Kuranda quandong.

They classified the annual climatic cycle into five seasons.

Early reports often wrote that the Kuku Yalanji were devoted to cannibalism, targeting in particular Chinese immigrants, whom they called kubara (Note: Anderson cites a suggestion by David Ip that this word may represent an adoption into an Aboriginal language of the anglicized spellings, such as were Karboro/Kaboro, of a Chinese word for Chinese shops, which Ip gives as GABO, apparently representing an honorific GA and the word for treasure, BO (Anderson & Mitchell 1981, p. 27, n.26).) or miran bilin (tight eyes). It is not infrequent to encounter early accounts of the eating of parts of the dead, which however was a restricted practice related to ritual mortuary customs. The vivid narrations of their killing their own women and children for eating to allay their hunger or of "feasting" on Chinese like "manna from heaven" in popular works like that of Hector Holthouse, are now considered wild exaggerations, since the actual evidence is skimpy. Christopher Anderson, who transcribed one account by an elderly fully initiated Kuku Yalanji man glosses the story by suggesting that:

Apart from the probably rare actual incidents of human flesh consumption, the strong European belief in Aboriginal cannibalism in this area arose and persists today, I would argue, as an ideological mechanism: it states and reinforces the belief that Aborigines were less human or at the very least were "uncivilized" if they ate other humans. This then justified their removal from the land and their extermination.

== Today ==
The Kuku Yalanji, believed to number some 3,000 people (2003), constitute one of the "Bama Rainforest Peoples". They are reputedly closely related to the Wulpura rain forest dwellers on the plateau in the modern day Mount Windsor National Park.

== Native title ==
The Kuku-Yalanji people registered a Native Title Claim over parts of their traditional land in May 1995. The eastern Kuku Yalanji people were eventually recognised as the traditional owners of their land in the form of 15 Indigenous land use agreements (ILUAs) in April 2007, covering more than 230,000 hectares (570,000 acres) between Mossman and Cooktown. In the agreements, signed on 19 October 2007, 64,000 hectares (160,000 acres) were designated as freehold land, partly for conservation and partly for residential or economic development use. The majority of the land would be managed by the Eastern Kuku Yalanji people and the Queensland Parks and Wildlife Service (QPWS).

In its determination, finalised on 9 December 2007, the Federal Court of Australia recognised that the Eastern Kuku Yalanji People have exclusive native title rights over 30,300 hectares (75,000 acres) of unallocated state land, which means that they "possess, occupy and use the area to the exclusion of all others" and have rights of succession and inheritance. In most of the area, which comprise 96,600 hectares (239,000 acres) of timber reserve, term leases and special leases, the Eastern Kuku Yalanji People have non-exclusive rights to hunting, camping, conducting ceremonies, burials, use of water and various other shared rights. The land is managed by an RNTBC, the Jabalbina Yalanji Aboriginal Corporation, which belongs to the Cape York Land Council.

In an agreement signed on 28 September 2021, the eastern Kuku Yalanji were handed back 160,108 hectares (395,640 acres) of land encompassing the UNESCO World Heritage–listed Daintree Rainforest, together with Ngalba Bulal, Kalkajaka and Hope Islands National Park.

== Notable people ==
=== Art ===
- Vernon Ah Kee, artist, co-founder of artist collective proppaNOW
- Tony Albert, artist, co-founder of artist collective proppaNOW
- John Harding, playwright, poet, theatre and film director, academic, activist. Founder of Ilbijerri Theatre

=== Entertainment ===
- Jessica Mauboy, Australian R&B and pop recording artist
- David Hudson, musician and cultural educator

=== Sport ===
- Cathy Freeman, athlete
- Che Cockatoo-Collins, Australian rules footballer (AFL) player
- Don Cockatoo-Collins, Australian rules footballer (AFL) player
- Nakia Cockatoo, Australian rules footballer (AFL) player
- Jarrod Harbrow, Australian rules footballer (AFL) player
- Nathan Daly, rugby league and rugby union player
- Ezra Mam, rugby league player
- Timana Tahu, rugby league and rugby union footballer
- Adam Sarota, soccer player

=== Other ===
- Pat O'Shane, teacher, barrister, and activist, Australia's first Aboriginal magistrate

== Sources ==
- Anderson, Christopher (July 1992). "Deaths in Custody: Kuku-Yalanji and the State". Social Analysis: The International Journal of Social and Cultural Practice. 31 (31): 1–11. JSTOR 23164558.
- Anderson, Christopher; Mitchell, Norman (1981). "Kubara: a Kuku-Yalanji View of the Chinese in North Queensland". Aboriginal History. 5 (1/2): 20–37. JSTOR 24045701.
- Cooper, Anthony (3 March 2017). "Experience Australia's Indigenous Culture". The Daily Telegraph.
- Eastern Kuku Yalanji People's native title determination, Far north Queensland (PDF) (Report). National Native Title Tribunal. 9 December 2007.
- "Eastern Kuku Yalanji, the State of Queensland & Douglas Shire Council (ILUA)". ATNS. University of Melbourne. 26 January 2011.
- "Episode 47 - Nathan Daly". Omny.fm. Jam Pakt with Jonzy. 23 April 2020.
- Hershberger, Hank; Hershberger, Ruth (1982). Kuku Yalanji Dictionary. Summer Institute of Linguistics, Darwin Branch.
- Hill, Rosemary; Baird, Adelaide (March 2003). "Kuku-Yalanji Rainforest Aboriginal People and Carbohydrate Resource Management in the Wet Tropics of Queensland, Australia". Human Ecology. 31 (1): 27–52. doi:10.1023/A:1022830123349. JSTOR 4603456. S2CID 152635891.
- Holthouse, Hector (1967). River of gold: the story of the Palmer River gold rush. Sydney: Angus and Robertson.
- "Jabalbina Yalanji Aboriginal Corporation". Cape York Land Council. 13 April 2018.
- "Kuku Yalanji People". Mossman Gorge Centre. 2022.
- "Kuku Yalanji people granted native title". ABC News. 11 April 2007.
- "Native Title Determination Details: QCD2007/002 - Eastern Kuku Yalanji People". National Native Title Tribunal. 9 December 2007.
- Patz, Elizabeth (2002). A grammar of the Kuku Yalanji language of North Queensland. Canberra: Pacific Linguistics. doi:10.15144/PL-527. hdl:1885/146148. ISBN 0-85883-534-7.
- Smee, Ben (28 September 2021). "Indigenous traditional owners win back Daintree rainforest in historic deal". The Guardian.
- Tindale, Norman Barnett (1974). "Kokojelandji (QLD)". Aboriginal Tribes of Australia: Their Terrain, Environmental Controls, Distribution, Limits, and Proper Names. Australian National University Press. ISBN 978-0-708-10741-6.
- Willis, Carli; Wyles, Dwayne; Richardson, Holly (30 September 2021). "Historic moment as Daintree National Park returned to Eastern Kuku Yalanji people". ABC News.
