= Wakara people =

Indigenous people from Australia

The Wakara or Wakura were an indigenous Australian people of the state of Queensland.

== Country ==
The Wakara are estimated by Norman Tindale to have had a tribal domain of some 3.100 square miles (260 km^{2}), running along the southern flank of the upper Mitchell River, and extending eastwards as far as Mount Mulligan. To the west their frontiers lay around Wrotham Park and Blackdown.

== History of contact ==
White contact with the Wakara people began in 1875, when settlers remarked that they were a powerful tribe in the region. They also noted the presence of another group, west of Mount Mulligan, called the Wunjurika, which may have been an autonomous tribe or simply a band society of the Wakara. Within 15 years, by 1890, the Wunjurika had been so thoroughly absorbed into the Wakara tribe that they lost whatever independent identity they may have had. Though numerous at the initial stage of contact, the Goldfields Commissioner on the Hodgkinson diggings, H. M. Mowbray, wrote that within the decade, they had been "much reduced by its frequent encounters with the Native Police and the settlers, as well as by diseases introduced by the Whites." Syphilis, also spread by contact with whites. Most descendants of the Wakara people by the 1930s were more than 90% white and 10% indigenous. Most wakara descendants predominantly the women did not identify as aboriginal to protect themselves and their children during the “stolen generation” which further severely damaged their culture and knowledge of their heritage.

== Alternative names ==
- Koko-wogura
- Kookoowarra (according to R. H. Mathews, and signifying "bad speakers")
- Wakoora
- Wakura
- Wun-yurika

Source: Tindale 1974, p. 187

== Some words ==
- amoo. ('mother')
- beeroo-beeroo. ('white man')
- kia ('tame dog')
- nunchun ('father')

Source: Mowbray 1886, p. 406

== Sources ==
- Mathews, R. H. (1898). "Group divisions and initiation ceremonies of the Barkungee tribes". Proceedings of the Royal Society of New South Wales. 32. Sydney: 241–255. doi:10.5962/p.359301. S2CID 259756893.
- McConnel, Ursula H. (September 1939). "Social Organization of the Tribes of Cape York Peninsula, North Queensland". Oceania. 10 (1). Sydney: 54–72. doi:10.1002/j.1834-4461.1939.tb00256.x. JSTOR 40327720.
- McConnel, Ursula H. (June 1940). "Social Organization of the Tribes of Cape York Peninsula, North Queensland (Continued)". Oceania. 10 (4). Sydney: 434–455. doi:10.1002/j.1834-4461.1940.tb00305.x. JSTOR 40327867.
- Mowbray, H. M. (1886). "Granite Range, close to the head of the Mitchell River, and east of the Hodgkinson goldfields." (PDF). In Curr, Edward Micklethwaite (ed.). The Australian race: its origin, languages, customs, place of landing in Australia and the routes by which it spread itself over the continent. Vol. 2. Melbourne: J. Ferres. pp. 402–407.
- Richards, F. (1926). Customs and language of the Western Hodgkinson aboriginals. Vol. 8. Memoirs of the Queensland Museum. pp. 249–265.
- Sharp, R. Lauriston (March 1939). "Tribes and Totemism in North-East Australia". Oceania. 9 (3). Sydney: 254–275. doi:10.1002/j.1834-4461.1939.tb00232.x. JSTOR 40327744.
- Tindale, Norman Barnett (1974). "Wakara (QLD)". Aboriginal Tribes of Australia: Their Terrain, Environmental Controls, Distribution, Limits, and Proper Names. Australian National University Press.
